= 1992–93 United States network television schedule =

The 1992–93 network television schedule for the four major English language commercial broadcast networks in the United States covers the primetime hours from September 1992 through August 1993. The schedule is followed by a list per network of returning series, new series, and series cancelled after the 1991–92 season.

The 1992–93 season marked the final time for the Financial Interest and Syndication Rules as it was eliminated in 1993.

PBS is not included; member stations have local flexibility over most of their schedules and broadcasts times for network shows may vary.

Each of the 30 highest-rated shows released in May 1993 is listed with its rank and rating as determined by Nielsen Media Research.

New series are highlighted in bold.

Repeat airings or same-day rebroadcasts are indicated by (R).

All times are U.S. Eastern and Pacific Time (except for some live sports or events). Subtract one hour for Central, Mountain, Alaska and Hawaii–Aleutian times.

== Legend ==
- Light blue indicates local programming.
- Gray indicates encore programming.
- Blue-gray indicates news programming.
- Light green indicates sporting events.
- Red indicates series being burned off and other irregularly scheduled programs, including specials and movies.
- highlight Lime highlights indicates the number-one watched program of the season.
- highlight Yellow highlights indicates the top-10 most watched programs of the season.
- highlight Cyan highlights indicates numbers 11-20 most watched programs of the season.
- highlight Magenta highlights indicates numbers 21-30 most watched programs of the season.
- highlight Highlights indicates that it falls in multiple of the above categories.

== Sunday ==
Network		7:00 PM	7:30 PM	8:00 PM	8:30 PM	9:00 PM	9:30 PM	10:00 PM	10:30 PM
ABC	Fall	Life Goes On		America's Funniest Home Videos	America's Funniest People	The ABC Sunday Night Movie (28/13.3) (Tied with Matlock)			
ABC	Winter	Life Goes On		America's Funniest Home Videos	America's Funniest People	The ABC Sunday Night Movie (28/13.3) (Tied with Matlock)			
ABC	Spring	America's Funniest Home Videos	America's Funniest People	**Day One**		The ABC Sunday Night Movie (28/13.3) (Tied with Matlock)			
ABC	Mid-spring	America's Funniest Home Videos	Dinosaurs	**Day One**		The ABC Sunday Night Movie (28/13.3) (Tied with Matlock)			
ABC	Summer	Life Goes On		America's Funniest Home Videos	America's Funniest People	The ABC Sunday Night Movie (28/13.3) (Tied with Matlock)			
CBS		60 Minutes (1/21.9)		Murder, She Wrote (5/17.7)		CBS Sunday Movie (8/16.1) (Tied with Cheers)			
Fox	Fall	**Great Scott!**	**The Ben Stiller Show**	In Living Color	Roc	Married... with Children	Herman's Head	**Flying Blind**	**Woops!**
Fox	Winter	**Batman: The Animated Series**	**Shaky Ground**	In Living Color	Roc	Married... with Children	Herman's Head	**Flying Blind**	**The Ben Stiller Show**
Fox	Mid-winter	**Batman: The Animated Series**	**Shaky Ground**	In Living Color	Roc	Married... with Children	Herman's Head	**Flying Blind**	**The Edge**
Fox	Spring	Parker Lewis Can't Lose	**Shaky Ground**	In Living Color	Roc	Married... with Children	Herman's Head	**Flying Blind**	**The Edge**
Fox	Summer	Parker Lewis Can't Lose	**Danger Theatre**	In Living Color	Roc	Married... with Children	Herman's Head	**TriBeCa** (R)	
NBC	Fall	Secret Service		I Witness Video		NBC Sunday Night Movie			
NBC	Winter	Secret Service		I Witness Video		NBC Sunday Night Movie			
NBC	Spring	Secret Service		I Witness Video		NBC Sunday Night Movie			
NBC	Summer	Quantum Leap (R)		I Witness Video		NBC Sunday Night Movie			

== Monday ==
Network		8:00 p.m.	8:30 p.m.	9:00 p.m.	9:30 p.m.	10:00 p.m.	10:30 p.m.
ABC	Fall	The Young Indiana Jones Chronicles		Monday Night Football (7/16.7)			
ABC	Mid-fall	FBI: The Untold Stories	American Detective	Monday Night Football (7/16.7)			
ABC	Winter	FBI: The Untold Stories	American Detective	The ABC Monday Night Movie			
ABC	Spring	FBI: The Untold Stories	American Detective	The ABC Monday Night Movie			
ABC	Summer	FBI: The Untold Stories	American Detective	The ABC Monday Night Movie			
CBS	Fall	Evening Shade (19/14.5)	**Hearts Afire** (20/14.3)	Murphy Brown (4/17.9)	**Love & War** (15/14.7)	Northern Exposure (11/15.2)	
CBS	Winter	Evening Shade (19/14.5)	**Hearts Afire** (20/14.3)	Murphy Brown (4/17.9)	**Love & War** (15/14.7)	Northern Exposure (11/15.2)	
CBS	Spring	Evening Shade (19/14.5)	**Bob**	Murphy Brown (4/17.9)	**Love & War** (15/14.7)	Northern Exposure (11/15.2)	
CBS	Mid-spring	Evening Shade (19/14.5)	Major Dad (R)	Murphy Brown (4/17.9)	**Love & War** (15/14.7)	Northern Exposure (11/15.2)	
CBS	Summer	Evening Shade (19/14.5)	Major Dad (R)	Murphy Brown (4/17.9)	**Big Wave Dave's**	Northern Exposure (11/15.2)	
Fox		Fox Night at the Movies				Local programming	
NBC		The Fresh Prince of Bel-Air (16/14.6) (Tied with Hangin' with Mr. Cooper and The Jackie Thomas Show)	Blossom (26/13.5) (Tied with 48 Hours)	The NBC Monday Movie (24/13.9)			

== Tuesday ==
Network		8:00 PM	8:30 PM	9:00 PM	9:30 PM	10:00 PM	10:30 PM
ABC	Fall	Full House (10/15.8)	**Hangin' with Mr. Cooper** (16/14.6) (Tied with The Fresh Prince of Bel-Air and The Jackie Thomas Show)	Roseanne (2/20.7)	Coach (6/17.5)	**Going to Extremes**	
ABC	Late fall	Full House (10/15.8)	**Hangin' with Mr. Cooper** (16/14.6) (Tied with The Fresh Prince of Bel-Air and The Jackie Thomas Show)	Roseanne (2/20.7)	**The Jackie Thomas Show** (16/14.6) (Tied with The Fresh Prince of Bel-Air and Hangin' with Mr. Cooper)	**Going to Extremes**	
ABC	Winter	Full House (10/15.8)	**Hangin' with Mr. Cooper** (16/14.6) (Tied with The Fresh Prince of Bel-Air and The Jackie Thomas Show)	Roseanne (2/20.7)	**The Jackie Thomas Show** (16/14.6) (Tied with The Fresh Prince of Bel-Air and Hangin' with Mr. Cooper)	Civil Wars	
ABC	Spring	Full House (10/15.8)	**Hangin' with Mr. Cooper** (16/14.6) (Tied with The Fresh Prince of Bel-Air and The Jackie Thomas Show)	Roseanne (2/20.7)	**The Jackie Thomas Show** (16/14.6) (Tied with The Fresh Prince of Bel-Air and Hangin' with Mr. Cooper)	Homefront	
ABC	Mid-spring	Full House (10/15.8)	**Hangin' with Mr. Cooper** (16/14.6) (Tied with The Fresh Prince of Bel-Air and The Jackie Thomas Show)	Roseanne (2/20.7)	**Delta**	Homefront	
ABC	Late spring	Full House (10/15.8)	**Hangin' with Mr. Cooper** (16/14.6) (Tied with The Fresh Prince of Bel-Air and The Jackie Thomas Show)	Roseanne (2/20.7)	**Delta**	Special programming	
ABC	Summer	Full House (10/15.8)	**Hangin' with Mr. Cooper** (16/14.6) (Tied with The Fresh Prince of Bel-Air and The Jackie Thomas Show)	Roseanne (2/20.7)	Room for Two	Jack's Place	
ABC	Mid-summer	Full House (10/15.8)	**Where I Live**	Roseanne (2/20.7)	Coach (6/17.5)	Special programming	
CBS		Rescue 911 (12/15.1) (Tied with 20/20)		CBS Tuesday Movie (14/14.8)			
Fox	Winter (began January 19, 1993)	**Class of '96**		**Key West**		Local programming	
Fox	Spring	**Class of '96**		**TriBeCa**		Local programming	
Fox	Late spring	Beverly Hills, 90210 (R)		**Key West**		Local programming	
Fox	Summer	Beverly Hills, 90210 (R)		America's Most Wanted (R)		Local programming	
NBC	Fall	Quantum Leap		Reasonable Doubts		Dateline NBC	
NBC	Winter	Quantum Leap		Reasonable Doubts		Dateline NBC	
NBC	Spring	Quantum Leap		Law & Order (R)		Dateline NBC	
NBC	Summer	**Route 66**		**South Beach**		Dateline NBC	
NBC	Mid-summer	NBC Tuesday Night Movie				Dateline NBC	

Note: Fox added a Tuesday night lineup in January, giving it a schedule on all seven nights of the week for the first time.

== Wednesday ==
Network		8:00 p.m.	8:30 p.m.	9:00 p.m.	9:30 p.m.	10:00 p.m.	10:30 p.m.
ABC	Fall	The Wonder Years	Doogie Howser, M.D.	Home Improvement (3/19.4)	**Laurie Hill**	Civil Wars	
ABC	Mid-fall	The Wonder Years	Doogie Howser, M.D.	Home Improvement (3/19.4)	Coach (6/17.5)	Civil Wars	
ABC	Winter	The Wonder Years	Doogie Howser, M.D.	Home Improvement (3/19.4)	Coach (6/17.5)	**Going to Extremes**	
ABC	Late winter	The Wonder Years	Doogie Howser, M.D.	Home Improvement (3/19.4)	Coach (6/17.5)	**Sirens**	
ABC	Spring	The Wonder Years	**Home Free**	Home Improvement (3/19.4)	Coach (6/17.5)	**Sirens**	
ABC	Late spring	The Wonder Years	Doogie Howser, M.D.	Home Improvement (3/19.4)	Coach (6/17.5)	**Sirens**	
ABC	Summer	The Wonder Years	**Street Match**	Home Improvement (3/19.4)	**Delta**	**Sirens**	
CBS	Fall	**The Hat Squad**		In the Heat of the Night		48 Hours (26/13.5) (Tied with Blossom)	
CBS	Winter	**Space Rangers**		In the Heat of the Night		48 Hours (26/13.5) (Tied with Blossom)	
CBS	Late winter	**How'd They Do That?**		In the Heat of the Night		48 Hours (26/13.5) (Tied with Blossom)	
CBS	Spring	**How'd They Do That?**		In the Heat of the Night		48 Hours (26/13.5) (Tied with Blossom)	
CBS	Summer	**Family Dog**		In the Heat of the Night		48 Hours (26/13.5) (Tied with Blossom)	
CBS	Late summer	**The Trouble with Larry**	**Tall Hopes**	In the Heat of the Night		48 Hours (26/13.5) (Tied with Blossom)	
Fox		Beverly Hills, 90210		Melrose Place		Local programming	
NBC	Fall	Unsolved Mysteries (21/14.2)		Seinfeld (25/13.7)	**Mad About You**	Law & Order	
NBC	Winter	Unsolved Mysteries (21/14.2)		**Homicide: Life on the Street**		Law & Order	
NBC	Spring	Unsolved Mysteries (21/14.2)		**Homicide: Life on the Street**		Law & Order	
NBC	Summer	Unsolved Mysteries (21/14.2)		Various programming		Law & Order	
NBC	Late summer	Unsolved Mysteries (21/14.2)		**Now with Tom Brokaw and Katie Couric**		Law & Order	

== Thursday ==
Network		8:00 p.m.	8:30 p.m.	9:00 p.m.	9:30 p.m.	10:00 p.m.	10:30 p.m.
ABC	Fall	**Delta**	Room for Two	Homefront		Primetime Live (22/14.1)	
ABC	Winter	Matlock (28/13.3) (Tied with the ABC Sunday Night Movie)		Jack's Place		Primetime Live (22/14.1)	
ABC	Late winter	Matlock (28/13.3) (Tied with the ABC Sunday Night Movie)		Various programming		Primetime Live (22/14.1)	
ABC	Spring	Matlock (28/13.3) (Tied with the ABC Sunday Night Movie)		Various programming		Primetime Live (22/14.1)	
ABC	Summer	Various programming				Primetime Live (22/14.1)	
CBS	Early fall	Top Cops		Street Stories with Ed Bradley		**Middle Ages**	
CBS	Fall	Top Cops		Street Stories with Ed Bradley		Knots Landing	
CBS	Winter	Top Cops		Street Stories with Ed Bradley		Knots Landing	
CBS	Spring	Top Cops		Street Stories with Ed Bradley		**Picket Fences**	
CBS	Summer	Top Cops		Various programming		**Picket Fences**	
Fox	Fall	The Simpsons (30/13.0) (Tied with Wings)	**Martin**	**The Heights**		Local programming	
Fox	Late fall	The Simpsons (30/13.0) (Tied with Wings)	**Martin**	In Living Color	Down the Shore	Local programming	
Fox	Winter	The Simpsons (30/13.0) (Tied with Wings)	**Martin**	In Living Color	Down the Shore	Local programming	
Fox	Spring	The Simpsons (30/13.0) (Tied with Wings)	**Martin**	In Living Color	Down the Shore	Local programming	
Fox	Summer	The Simpsons (30/13.0) (Tied with Wings)	**Martin**	In Living Color	Herman's Head (R)	Local programming	
NBC	Fall	A Different World	**Rhythm & Blues**	Cheers (8/16.1) (Tied with the CBS Sunday Movie)	Wings (30/13.0) (Tied with The Simpsons)	L.A. Law	
NBC	Mid-fall	**Out All Night**	A Different World	Cheers (8/16.1) (Tied with the CBS Sunday Movie)	Wings (30/13.0) (Tied with The Simpsons)	L.A. Law	
NBC	Winter	Cheers (R)	Wings (30/13.0) (Tied with The Simpsons)	Cheers (8/16.1) (Tied with the CBS Sunday Movie)	Seinfeld (25/13.7)	L.A. Law	
NBC	Late winter	Cheers (R)	Wings (30/13.0) (Tied with The Simpsons)	Cheers (8/16.1) (Tied with the CBS Sunday Movie)	Seinfeld (25/13.7)	**Crime & Punishment**	
NBC	Spring	Cheers (R)	Wings (30/13.0) (Tied with The Simpsons)	Cheers (8/16.1) (Tied with the CBS Sunday Movie)	Seinfeld (25/13.7)	L.A. Law	
NBC	Summer	A Different World	Wings (30/13.0) (Tied with The Simpsons)	Cheers (8/16.1) (Tied with the CBS Sunday Movie)	Seinfeld (25/13.7)	L.A. Law	
NBC	Mid-summer	**Mad About You** (R)	Wings (30/13.0) (Tied with The Simpsons)	Cheers (8/16.1) (Tied with the CBS Sunday Movie)	Seinfeld (25/13.7)	Sisters (R)	
NBC	Late summer	**Mad About You** (R)	Wings (30/13.0) (Tied with The Simpsons)	Cheers (8/16.1) (Tied with the CBS Sunday Movie)	Seinfeld (25/13.7)	Various programming	

== Friday ==
Network		8:00 PM	8:30 PM	9:00 PM	9:30 PM	10:00 PM	10:30 PM
ABC	Fall	Family Matters	Step by Step	Dinosaurs	**Camp Wilder**	20/20 (12/15.1) (Tied with Rescue 911)	
ABC	Winter	Family Matters	Step by Step	Dinosaurs	**Camp Wilder**	20/20 (12/15.1) (Tied with Rescue 911)	
ABC	Spring	Family Matters	Step by Step	**Getting By**	**Where I Live**	20/20 (12/15.1) (Tied with Rescue 911)	
ABC	Summer	Family Matters	Step by Step	Dinosaurs	**Home Free**	20/20 (12/15.1) (Tied with Rescue 911)	
ABC	Mid-summer	Family Matters	Step by Step	Dinosaurs	Perfect Strangers	20/20 (12/15.1) (Tied with Rescue 911)	
ABC	Late summer	Family Matters	**Hangin' with Mr. Cooper** (R)	Step by Step	Dinosaurs	20/20 (12/15.1) (Tied with Rescue 911)	
CBS	Fall	**The Golden Palace**	Major Dad	Designing Women	**Bob**	**Picket Fences**	
CBS	Winter	**The Golden Palace**	Major Dad	Designing Women	**Bob**	**Picket Fences**	
CBS	Spring	**The Golden Palace**	Major Dad	Designing Women	**Good Advice**	Bodies of Evidence	
CBS	Mid-spring	**The Golden Palace**	**Dudley**	Designing Women	**Good Advice**	Bodies of Evidence	
CBS	Summer	**The Golden Palace**	**Cutters**	Street Stories		**Johnny Bago**	
CBS	Mid-summer	**The Golden Palace**	Brooklyn Bridge	Street Stories		**Johnny Bago**	
CBS	Late summer	**How'd They Do That?**		**The Building**	**The Boys**	**Picket Fences**	
Fox	Fall	America's Most Wanted		Sightings	**Likely Suspects**	Local programming	
Fox	Winter	America's Most Wanted		Sightings	Sightings (R)	Local programming	
Fox	Spring	America's Most Wanted		Sightings	Sightings (R)	Local programming	
Fox	Summer	Various programming		Sightings	Sightings (R)	Local programming	
NBC	Fall	**Final Appeal**	**What Happened?**	**The Round Table**		I'll Fly Away	
NBC	Winter	NBC Friday Night Movie				I'll Fly Away	
NBC	Spring	Secret Service		NBC Friday Night Movie			
NBC	Summer	Various programming	**Out All Night**	NBC Friday Night Movie			
NBC	Mid-summer	Mancuso, F.B.I. (R)		NBC Friday Night Movie			

Notes: On NBC, Mancuso, F.B.I. consisted on reruns of the 1989-90 series.

== Saturday ==
Network		8:00 p.m.	8:30 p.m.	9:00 p.m.	9:30 p.m.	10:00 p.m.	10:30 p.m.
ABC	Fall	**Covington Cross**		**Crossroads**		The Commish	
ABC	Mid-fall	The ABC Saturday Night Movie				The Commish	
ABC	Winter	The Young Indiana Jones Chronicles		Various programming		The Commish	
ABC	Spring	Various programming				The Commish	
ABC	Summer	The ABC Saturday Night Movie				The Commish	
CBS	Fall	**Frannie's Turn**	Brooklyn Bridge	Raven		**Angel Street**	
CBS	Mid-fall	Specials and The CBS Saturday Night Movie					
CBS	Winter	**Dr. Quinn, Medicine Woman** (23/14.0)		Raven		**The Hat Squad**	
CBS	Spring	**Dr. Quinn, Medicine Woman** (23/14.0)		**A League of Their Own**	Brooklyn Bridge	Raven	
CBS	Mid-spring	**Dr. Quinn, Medicine Woman** (23/14.0)		**A League of Their Own**	Brooklyn Bridge	**Walker, Texas Ranger**	
CBS	Summer	**Dr. Quinn, Medicine Woman** (23/14.0)		The CBS Saturday Night Movie			
Fox	Fall	COPS	COPS (R)	Code 3	**The Edge**	Local programming	
Fox	Winter	COPS	COPS (R)	Code 3	Code 3 (R)	Local programming	
Fox	Spring	COPS	COPS (R)	Code 3	Code 3 (R)	Local programming	
Fox	Summer	COPS	COPS (R)	**Front Page**		Local programming	
NBC	Fall	**Here and Now**	**Out All Night**	Empty Nest	Nurses	Sisters	
NBC	Mid-fall	**Here and Now**	The Powers That Be	Empty Nest	Nurses	Sisters	
NBC	Winter	Empty Nest (R)	Nurses (R)	Empty Nest	Nurses	Sisters	
NBC	Mid-winter	Almost Home (*)	Nurses	Empty Nest	**Mad About You**	Sisters	
NBC	Spring	Almost Home (*)	Nurses	Empty Nest	**Mad About You**	Reasonable Doubts	
NBC	Mid-spring	Special programming		Empty Nest	**Mad About You**	Sisters	
NBC	Summer	Almost Home (*)	Nurses	Empty Nest	**Mad About You**	**Black Tie Affair**	The Powers That Be
NBC	Mid-summer	Almost Home (*)	Nurses	Empty Nest	**Mad About You**	Reasonable Doubts	
NBC	Late summer	**Super Bloopers and New Practical Jokes**		Empty Nest	Nurses	Sisters	

(*) Formerly known as The Torkelsons

== By network ==
=== ABC ===
Returning series

- 20/20
- The ABC Monday Night Movie
- The ABC Saturday Night Movie
- The ABC Sunday Night Movie
- America's Funniest Home Videos
- America's Funniest People
- American Detective
- Civil Wars
- Coach
- The Commish
- Dinosaurs
- Doogie Howser, M.D.
- Family Matters
- FBI: The Untold Stories
- Full House
- Home Improvement
- Homefront
- Jack's Place
- Life Goes On
- Matlock (moved from NBC)
- Monday Night Football
- Perfect Strangers
- Primetime Live
- Room for Two
- Roseanne
- Step by Step
- The Wonder Years
- The Young Indiana Jones Chronicles

New series

- **Camp Wilder**
- **Covington Cross**
- **Crossroads**
- **Day One**
- **Delta**
- **Getting By** *
- **Going to Extremes**
- **Hangin' with Mr. Cooper**
- **Home Free** *
- **The Jackie Thomas Show** *
- **Laurie Hill**
- **Sirens** *
- **Street Match** *
- **Where I Live** *
- **Wild Palms** *

Not returning from 1991–92:

- The ABC Thursday Night Movie
- Anything But Love
- Arresting Behavior
- Baby Talk
- Billy
- Capitol Critters
- Good & Evil
- Growing Pains
- Human Target
- Julie
- MacGyver
- On the Air
- Pros and Cons
- Sibs
- Who's the Boss?
- The Young Riders

=== CBS ===
Returning series

- 48 Hours
- 60 Minutes
- Bodies of Evidence
- Brooklyn Bridge
- CBS Sunday Movie
- Designing Women
- Evening Shade
- In the Heat of the Night (moved from NBC)
- Knots Landing
- Major Dad
- Murder, She Wrote
- Murphy Brown
- Northern Exposure
- Raven
- Rescue 911
- Street Stories with Ed Bradley
- Top Cops

New series

- **Angel Street**
- **Big Wave Dave's** *
- **Bob**
- **The Boys** *
- **The Building** *
- **Cutters** *
- **Dr. Quinn, Medicine Woman** *
- **Dudley** *
- **Family Dog** *
- **Frannie's Turn**
- **The Golden Palace**
- **Good Advice** *
- **The Hat Squad**
- **Hearts Afire**
- **How'd They Do That?** *
- **Johnny Bago** *
- **A League of Their Own** *
- **Love & War**
- **Middle Ages**
- **Picket Fences**
- **Space Rangers** *
- **Tall Hopes**
- **The Trouble with Larry**
- **Walker, Texas Ranger** *

Not returning from 1991–92:

- 2000 Malibu Road
- The Boys of Twilight
- The Carol Burnett Show
- Davis Rules
- Fish Police
- Freshman Dorm
- Grapevine
- Hearts Are Wild
- Howie
- The Human Factor
- Jake and the Fatman
- P.S. I Luv U
- Palace Guard
- Princesses
- The Royal Family
- Scorch
- Teech
- Tequila and Bonetti
- The Trials of Rosie O'Neill

=== Fox ===
Returning series

- America's Most Wanted
- Beverly Hills, 90210
- Code 3
- Comic Strip Live
- Cops
- Down the Shore
- Fox Night at the Movies
- Herman's Head
- In Living Color
- Melrose Place
- Married... with Children
- Parker Lewis Can't Lose
- Roc
- Sightings
- The Simpsons

New series

- **Batman: The Animated Series** (original aired in daytime)
- **The Ben Stiller Show**
- **Class of '96** *
- **Danger Theatre** *
- **The Edge**
- **Flying Blind**
- **The Front Page** *
- **Great Scott!**
- **The Heights**
- **Key West** *
- **Likely Suspects**
- **Martin**
- **Shaky Ground** *
- **TriBeCa** *
- **Woops!**

Not returning from 1991–92:

- Best of the Worst
- Bill & Ted's Excellent Adventure
- Charlie Hoover
- Drexell's Class
- Get a Life
- Rachel Gunn, R.N.
- Stand By Your Man
- The Sunday Comics
- Totally Hidden Video
- The Ultimate Challenge
- True Colors
- Vinnie & Bobby

=== NBC ===
Returning series

- Almost Home (formerly known as The Torkelsons)
- Blossom
- Cheers
- Dateline NBC
- A Different World
- Empty Nest
- The Fresh Prince of Bel-Air
- I Witness Video
- I'll Fly Away
- L.A. Law
- Law & Order
- NBC Sunday Night Movie
- The NBC Monday Movie
- Nurses
- The Powers That Be
- Quantum Leap
- Reasonable Doubts
- Secret Service
- Seinfeld
- Sisters
- Unsolved Mysteries
- Wings

New series

- **Black Tie Affair** *
- **Crime & Punishment** *
- **Final Appeal**
- **Here and Now**
- **Homicide: Life on the Street** *
- **Mad About You**
- **Out All Night**
- **Rhythm & Blues**
- **The Round Table**
- **Route 66** *
- **South Beach** *
- **Super Bloopers and New Practical Jokes** *
- **What Happened?**

Not returning from 1991–92:

- The Adventures of Mark & Brian
- The Cosby Show
- Dear John
- Eerie, Indiana
- Exposé
- The Fifth Corner
- Flesh 'n' Blood
- The Golden Girls
- Hot Country Nights
- In the Heat of the Night (moved to CBS)
- Man of the People
- Mann & Machine
- Matlock (moved to ABC)
- Night Court
- Nightmare Cafe
- Pacific Station
- Walter & Emily

Note: The * indicates that the program was introduced in midseason.
