= 1991–92 United States network television schedule =

Television schedule for the fall of 1991

The 1991–92 network television schedule for the four major English language commercial broadcast networks in the United States covers primetime hours from September 1991 through August 1992. The schedule is followed by a list per network of returning series, new series, and series cancelled after the 1990–91 season. All times are Eastern and Pacific, with certain exceptions, such as Monday Night Football.

New series are highlighted in bold. Series ending their original runs are highlighted in italics.

Each of the 30 highest-rated shows is listed with its rank and rating as determined by Nielsen Media Research.

Lime indicates the number-one most-watched program of the season.
Yellow indicates the programs in the top 10 for the season.
Cyan indicates the programs in the top 20 for the season.
Magenta indicates the programs in the top 30 for the season.

PBS is not included; member stations have local flexibility over most of their schedules and broadcast times for network shows may vary. From February 8 to 24, 1992, all of CBS' primetime programming was preempted in favor of coverage of the 1992 Winter Olympics in Albertville, and from July 25 to August 9, 1992, all of NBC's primetime programming was preempted in favor of coverage of the 1992 Summer Olympics in Barcelona.

== Sunday ==
| Network | | 7:00 PM | 7:30 PM | 8:00 PM | 8:30 PM | 9:00 PM | 9:30 PM | 10:00 PM | 10:30 PM |
|---|---|---|---|---|---|---|---|---|---|
| ABC | | Life Goes On | | America's Funniest Home Videos (20/14.5) | America's Funniest People (25/13.8) (Tied with the ABC Monday Night Movie) | The ABC Sunday Night Movie | | | |
| CBS | | 60 Minutes (1/21.9) | | Murder, She Wrote (8/16.9) | | CBS Sunday Movie (14/15.9) | | | |
| Fox | Fall | True Colors | Parker Lewis Can't Lose | In Living Color | **Roc** | Married... with Children | **Herman's Head** | The Sunday Comics | |
| Fox | Winter | True Colors | Parker Lewis Can't Lose | In Living Color | **Roc** | Married... with Children | **Herman's Head** | The Sunday Comics | |
| Fox | Spring | True Colors | Parker Lewis Can't Lose | **Roc** | In Living Color | Married... with Children | **Herman's Head** | **Stand By Your Man** | Get a Life |
| Fox | Summer | **Bill & Ted's Excellent Adventures** | True Colors | In Living Color | **Rachel Gunn, R.N.** | Married... with Children | **Herman's Head** | **Down the Shore** | **Stand By Your Man** |
| NBC | Fall | **The Adventures of Mark & Brian** | **Eerie, Indiana** | **Man of the People** | **Pacific Station** | NBC Sunday Night Movie | | | |
| NBC | Late fall | **Eerie, Indiana** | **The Torkelsons** | **Hot Country Nights** | | NBC Sunday Night Movie | | | |
| NBC | Spring | **Eerie, Indiana** | **Against All Odds** | **Mann & Machine** | | NBC Sunday Night Movie | | | |
| NBC | Summer | **The Adventures of Mark & Brian** | **Against All Odds** | In the Heat of the Night (R) | | NBC Sunday Night Movie | | | |
| NBC | Late summer | **Secret Service** | | **I Witness Video** | | NBC Sunday Night Movie | | | |

== Monday ==
| Network | | 8:00 PM | 8:30 PM | 9:00 PM | 9:30 PM | 10:00 PM | 10:30 PM |
|---|---|---|---|---|---|---|---|
| ABC | Fall | MacGyver | | Monday Night Football (12/16.6) | | | |
| ABC | Winter | **FBI: The Untold Stories** | **American Detective** | The ABC Monday Night Movie (25/13.8) (Tied with America's Funniest People) | | | |
| ABC | Spring | **FBI: The Untold Stories** | **American Detective** | The ABC Monday Night Movie (25/13.8) (Tied with America's Funniest People) | | | |
| ABC | Summer | **FBI: The Untold Stories** | **American Detective** | The ABC Monday Night Movie (25/13.8) (Tied with America's Funniest People) | | | |
| CBS | Fall | Evening Shade (15/15.6) | Major Dad (9/16.8) | Murphy Brown (3/18.6) | Designing Women (6/17.3) | Northern Exposure (16/15.5) | |
| CBS | Winter | Evening Shade (15/15.6) | Major Dad (9/16.8) | Murphy Brown (3/18.6) | Designing Women (6/17.3) | Northern Exposure (16/15.5) | |
| CBS | Spring | Evening Shade (15/15.6) | Major Dad (9/16.8) | Murphy Brown (3/18.6) | Designing Women (6/17.3) | Northern Exposure (16/15.5) | |
| CBS | Summer | Evening Shade (15/15.6) | Major Dad (9/16.8) | Murphy Brown (3/18.6) | **Grapevine** | Northern Exposure (16/15.5) | |
| CBS | Mid-summer | Evening Shade (15/15.6) | Major Dad (9/16.8) | Murphy Brown (3/18.6) | Designing Women (6/17.3) | Northern Exposure (16/15.5) | |
| Fox | | Fox Night at the Movies | | | | Local programming | |
| NBC | | The Fresh Prince of Bel-Air (22/14.3) (Tied with Empty Nest) | Blossom | The NBC Monday Movie (24/13.9) | | | |

== Tuesday ==
| Network | | 8:00 PM | 8:30 PM | 9:00 PM | 9:30 PM | 10:00 PM | 10:30 PM |
|---|---|---|---|---|---|---|---|
| ABC | Fall | Full House (7/17.0) | **Home Improvement** (4/17.5) (Tied with Cheers) | Roseanne (2/19.9) | Coach (10/16.7) (Tied with Room for Two) | **Homefront** | |
| ABC | Winter | Full House (7/17.0) | **Home Improvement** (4/17.5) (Tied with Cheers) | Roseanne (2/19.9) | Coach (10/16.7) (Tied with Room for Two) | **Homefront** | |
| ABC | Spring | Full House (7/17.0) | **Home Improvement** (4/17.5) (Tied with Cheers) | Roseanne (2/19.9) | **Room for Two** (10/16.7) (Tied with Coach) | **Civil Wars** | |
| ABC | Mid-spring | Full House (7/17.0) | **Home Improvement** (4/17.5) (Tied with Cheers) | Roseanne (2/19.9) | Coach (10/16.7) (Tied with Room for Two) | **Civil Wars** | |
| ABC | Summer | Full House (7/17.0) | **Home Improvement** (4/17.5) (Tied with Cheers) | Roseanne (2/19.9) | Coach (10/16.7) (Tied with Room for Two) | **Jack's Place** | |
| CBS | | Rescue 911 | | The CBS Tuesday Movie | | | |
| NBC | Fall | **I'll Fly Away** | | In the Heat of the Night (30/13.1) (Tied with The Golden Girls) | | Law & Order | |
| NBC | Winter | **I'll Fly Away** | | In the Heat of the Night (30/13.1) (Tied with The Golden Girls) | | Law & Order | |
| NBC | Spring | In the Heat of the Night (30/13.1) (Tied with The Golden Girls) | | Law & Order | | **Reasonable Doubts** | |
| NBC | Mid-spring | In the Heat of the Night (30/13.1) (Tied with The Golden Girls) | | Law & Order | | **Dateline NBC** | |
| NBC | Summer | **Mann & Machine** | | Law & Order | | **Dateline NBC** | |
| NBC | Mid-summer | **Mann & Machine** | | Quantum Leap (R) | | **Dateline NBC** | |
| NBC | Late summer | Quantum Leap (R) | | **Reasonable Doubts** | | **Dateline NBC** | |

== Wednesday ==
| Network | | 8:00 PM | 8:30 PM | 9:00 PM | 9:30 PM | 10:00 PM | 10:30 PM |
|---|---|---|---|---|---|---|---|
| ABC | Fall | Dinosaurs | The Wonder Years | Doogie Howser, M.D. | **Sibs** | Anything but Love | **Good & Evil** |
| ABC | Late fall | Dinosaurs | The Wonder Years | Doogie Howser, M.D. | Anything but Love | **Civil Wars** | |
| ABC | Winter | Dinosaurs | The Wonder Years | Doogie Howser, M.D. | Anything but Love | **Civil Wars** | |
| ABC | Spring | The Wonder Years | Doogie Howser, M.D. | **The Young Indiana Jones Chronicles** | | **Homefront** | |
| ABC | Mid-spring | The Wonder Years | Doogie Howser, M.D. | **Room for Two** (10/16.7) (Tied with Coach) | **Sibs** | **The Young Indiana Jones Chronicles** | |
| ABC | Summer | The Wonder Years | Growing Pains (R) | Doogie Howser, M.D. | Anything but Love | **Civil Wars** | |
| ABC | Mid-summer | The Wonder Years | Growing Pains (R) | Doogie Howser, M.D. | Who's the Boss? (R) | **Civil Wars** | |
| ABC | Late summer | The Wonder Years | Doogie Howser, M.D. | **Home Improvement** (R) | **Arresting Behavior** | **Civil Wars** | |
| CBS | Fall | **The Royal Family** | **Teech** | Jake and the Fatman | | 48 Hours (29/13.2) | |
| CBS | Late fall | **Brooklyn Bridge** | **The Royal Family** | Jake and the Fatman | | 48 Hours (29/13.2) | |
| CBS | Winter | Davis Rules | **Brooklyn Bridge** | Jake and the Fatman | | 48 Hours (29/13.2) | |
| CBS | Spring | **The Royal Family** | Davis Rules | Jake and the Fatman | | 48 Hours (29/13.2) | |
| CBS | Late spring | Davis Rules | **Brooklyn Bridge** | Jake and the Fatman | | 48 Hours (29/13.2) | |
| CBS | Summer | **Howie** | Davis Rules | **Raven** | | 48 Hours (29/13.2) | |
| CBS | Late summer | **Freshman Dorm** | | **2000 Malibu Road** | | 48 Hours (29/13.2) | |
| Fox | Summer (starting July 8, 1992) | Beverly Hills, 90210 | | **Melrose Place** | | Local programming | |
| NBC | Fall | Unsolved Mysteries (13/16.5) | | Night Court | Seinfeld | Quantum Leap | |
| NBC | Winter | Unsolved Mysteries (13/16.5) | | Seinfeld | Night Court | Quantum Leap | |
| NBC | Spring | Unsolved Mysteries (13/16.5) | | Seinfeld | Dear John | Quantum Leap | |
| NBC | Mid-spring | Unsolved Mysteries (13/16.5) | | Seinfeld | Night Court | Quantum Leap | |
| NBC | Summer | Unsolved Mysteries (13/16.5) | | Seinfeld | Night Court | Quantum Leap | |
| NBC | Mid-summer | Unsolved Mysteries (13/16.5) | | Seinfeld | Dear John | Quantum Leap | |
| NBC | Late summer | Unsolved Mysteries (13/16.5) | | Seinfeld | Wings (R) | Law & Order (R) | |

== Thursday ==
| Network | | 8:00 PM | 8:30 PM | 9:00 PM | 9:30 PM | 10:00 PM | 10:30 PM |
|---|---|---|---|---|---|---|---|
| ABC | Fall | Pros and Cons (*) | | **FBI: The Untold Stories** | **American Detective** | Primetime Live | |
| ABC | Winter | Pros and Cons (*) | | **FBI: The Untold Stories** | **American Detective** | Primetime Live | |
| ABC | Spring | The ABC Thursday Night Movie | | | | Primetime Live | |
| ABC | Summer | The Young Riders | | MacGyver (R) | | Primetime Live | |
| ABC | Late summer | Who's the Boss? (R) | Growing Pains (R) | **Homefront** (R) | | Primetime Live | |
| CBS | Fall | Top Cops | | The Trials of Rosie O'Neill | | Knots Landing | |
| CBS | Winter | Top Cops | | **Street Stories with Ed Bradley** | | Knots Landing | |
| CBS | Spring | Top Cops | | **Street Stories with Ed Bradley** | | **The Human Factor** | |
| CBS | Summer | Top Cops | | **Street Stories with Ed Bradley** | | **Bodies of Evidence** | |
| Fox | Fall | The Simpsons | **Drexell's Class** | Beverly Hills, 90210 | | Local programming | |
| Fox | Winter | The Simpsons | **Drexell's Class** | Beverly Hills, 90210 | | Local programming | |
| Fox | Spring | The Simpsons | **Drexell's Class** | Beverly Hills, 90210 | | Local programming | |
| Fox | Summer | The Simpsons | Parker Lewis Can't Lose | Beverly Hills, 90210 | | Local programming | |
| NBC | Fall | The Cosby Show (18/15.0) | A Different World (17/15.2) | Cheers (4/17.5) (Tied with Home Improvement) | Wings (19/14.6) | L.A. Law (28/13.3) | |
| NBC | Winter | The Cosby Show (18/15.0) | A Different World (17/15.2) | Cheers (4/17.5) (Tied with Home Improvement) | Wings (19/14.6) | L.A. Law (28/13.3) | |
| NBC | Spring | The Cosby Show (18/15.0) | A Different World (17/15.2) | Cheers (4/17.5) (Tied with Home Improvement) | Wings (19/14.6) | L.A. Law (28/13.3) | |
| NBC | Summer | A Different World (17/15.2) | The Cosby Show (18/15.0) | Cheers (4/17.5) (Tied with Home Improvement) | Wings (19/14.6) | L.A. Law (28/13.3) | |

(*) Formerly known as Gabriel's Fire

== Friday ==
| Network | | 8:00 PM | 8:30 PM | 9:00 PM | 9:30 PM | 10:00 PM | 10:30 PM |
|---|---|---|---|---|---|---|---|
| ABC | Fall | Family Matters (27/13.5) | **Step by Step** | Perfect Strangers | Baby Talk | 20/20 (21/14.4) | |
| ABC | Winter | Family Matters (27/13.5) | **Step by Step** | Baby Talk | Perfect Strangers | 20/20 (21/14.4) | |
| ABC | Mid-winter | Family Matters (27/13.5) | **Step by Step** | Baby Talk | **Billy** | 20/20 (21/14.4) | |
| ABC | Spring | Family Matters (27/13.5) | **Step by Step** | Dinosaurs | Baby Talk | 20/20 (21/14.4) | |
| ABC | Summer | Family Matters (27/13.5) | **Step by Step** | Dinosaurs | Perfect Strangers | 20/20 (21/14.4) | |
| CBS | Fall | **Princesses** | **Brooklyn Bridge** | CBS Friday Night Movie | | | |
| CBS | Mid-fall | **Brooklyn Bridge** | **Princesses** | Various programming | | **Palace Guard** | |
| CBS | Late fall | Various programming | | **The Carol Burnett Show** | | Various programming | |
| CBS | Winter | Various programming | | **Tequila and Bonetti** | | **Hearts Are Wild** | |
| CBS | Spring | **Scorch** | **Fish Police** | **Tequila and Bonetti** | | **Hearts Are Wild** | |
| CBS | Mid-spring | **Tequila and Bonetti** | | CBS Friday Night Movie | | | |
| CBS | Late spring | Various programming | | CBS Friday Night Movie | | | |
| CBS | Summer | Various programming | | CBS Friday Night Movie | | | |
| Fox | Fall | America's Most Wanted | | **The Ultimate Challenge** | | Local programming | |
| Fox | Mid-fall | America's Most Wanted | | **Best of the Worst** | Totally Hidden Video | Local programming | |
| Fox | Winter | America's Most Wanted | | Totally Hidden Video | **Best of the Worst** | Local programming | |
| Fox | Mid-winter | America's Most Wanted | | Various programming | | Local programming | |
| Fox | Spring | America's Most Wanted | | Totally Hidden Video | Totally Hidden Video | Local programming | |
| Fox | Mid-spring | America's Most Wanted | | **Sightings** | Totally Hidden Video | Local programming | |
| Fox | Summer | America's Most Wanted | | **Sightings** | Totally Hidden Video | Local programming | |
| NBC | Fall | Real Life with Jane Pauley | Expose | Dear John | **Flesh 'n' Blood** | **Reasonable Doubts** | |
| NBC | Mid-fall | Matlock | | **Flesh 'n' Blood** | Dear John | **Reasonable Doubts** | |
| NBC | Late fall | Matlock | | **Pacific Station** | Dear John | **Reasonable Doubts** | |
| NBC | Winter | Matlock | | Various programming | | **Reasonable Doubts** | |
| NBC | Spring | Matlock | | **I'll Fly Away** | | **Nightmare Cafe** | |
| NBC | Mid-spring | Matlock | | **I'll Fly Away** | | **The Fifth Corner** | |
| NBC | Summer | Matlock | | **Reasonable Doubts** | | Law & Order (R) | |
| NBC | Late summer | Matlock | | Various programming | | **I'll Fly Away** | |

== Saturday ==
| Network | | 8:00 PM | 8:30 PM | 9:00 PM | 9:30 PM | 10:00 PM | 10:30 PM |
|---|---|---|---|---|---|---|---|
| ABC | Fall | Who's the Boss? | Growing Pains | The Young Riders | | **The Commish** | |
| ABC | Winter | **Capitol Critters** | Who's the Boss? | Perfect Strangers | Growing Pains | **The Commish** | |
| ABC | Spring | Who's the Boss? | **Billy** | Perfect Strangers | Growing Pains | **The Commish** | |
| ABC | Late spring | Who's the Boss? | **Julie** | **Billy** | Perfect Strangers | **The Commish** | |
| ABC | Summer | **Billy** | **Julie** | Perfect Strangers | **On the Air** | **The Commish** | |
| ABC | Mid-summer | MacGyver (R) | | **Human Target** | | **The Commish** | |
| CBS | Fall | CBS Saturday Movie | | | | **P.S. I Luv U** | |
| CBS | Winter | CBS Saturday Movie | | | | Rescue 911 | |
| CBS | Mid-winter | CBS Saturday Movie | | | | **The Boys of Twilight** | |
| CBS | Spring | CBS Saturday Movie | | | | The Trials of Rosie O'Neill | |
| CBS | Summer | CBS Saturday Movie | | | | Jake and the Fatman (R) | |
| Fox | Fall | COPS | COPS (R) | Totally Hidden Video | **Best of the Worst** | Local programming | |
| Fox | Mid-fall | COPS | COPS (R) | **Charlie Hoover** | Get a Life | Local programming | |
| Fox | Winter | COPS | COPS (R) | Special programming | | Local programming | |
| Fox | Spring | COPS | COPS (R) | **Code 3** | Totally Hidden Video | Local programming | |
| Fox | Summer | COPS | COPS (R) | **Code 3** | **Vinnie & Bobby** | Local programming | |
| NBC | Fall | The Golden Girls (30/13.1) (Tied with In the Heat of the Night) | **The Torkelsons** | Empty Nest (22/14.3) (Tied with The Fresh Prince of Bel-Air) | **Nurses** | Sisters | |
| NBC | Winter | The Golden Girls (30/13.1) (Tied with In the Heat of the Night) | **Walter & Emily** | Empty Nest (22/14.3) (Tied with The Fresh Prince of Bel-Air) | **Nurses** | Sisters | |
| NBC | Spring | The Golden Girls (30/13.1) (Tied with In the Heat of the Night) | **The Powers That Be** | Empty Nest (22/14.3) (Tied with The Fresh Prince of Bel-Air) | **Nurses** | Sisters | |
| NBC | Mid-spring | The Golden Girls (30/13.1) (Tied with In the Heat of the Night) | **The Torkelsons** | Empty Nest (22/14.3) (Tied with The Fresh Prince of Bel-Air) | **Nurses** | Sisters | |
| NBC | Summer | The Golden Girls (30/13.1) (Tied with In the Heat of the Night) | **Home Fires** | Empty Nest (22/14.3) (Tied with The Fresh Prince of Bel-Air) | **Nurses** | Sisters | |
| NBC | Late summer | The Golden Girls (30/13.1) (Tied with In the Heat of the Night) | **The Powers That Be** | Empty Nest (22/14.3) (Tied with The Fresh Prince of Bel-Air) | **Nurses** | Sisters | |

== By network ==
=== ABC ===
Returning series

- 20/20
- The ABC Monday Night Movie
- The ABC Sunday Night Movie
- The ABC Thursday Night Movie
- America's Funniest Home Videos
- America's Funniest People
- Anything But Love
- Baby Talk
- Coach
- Dinosaurs
- Doogie Howser, M.D.
- Family Matters
- Full House
- Growing Pains
- Life Goes On
- MacGyver
- Monday Night Football
- Perfect Strangers
- Primetime Live
- Pros and Cons (formerly known as Gabriel's Fire)
- Roseanne
- Who's the Boss?
- The Wonder Years
- The Young Riders

New series

- **American Detective** *
- **Arresting Behavior** *
- **Billy** *
- **Capitol Critters** *
- **Civil Wars** *
- **The Commish**
- **FBI: The Untold Stories**
- **Good & Evil**
- **Home Improvement**
- **Homefront**
- **Human Target** *
- **Jack's Place** *
- **Julie** *
- **On the Air** *
- **Room for Two** *
- **Sibs**
- **Step by Step**
- **The Young Indiana Jones Chronicles** *

Not returning from 1990–91:

- The ABC Saturday Night Movie
- China Beach
- Cop Rock
- Davis Rules (moved to CBS)
- Eddie Dodd
- Equal Justice
- Father Dowling Mysteries
- Going Places
- Head of the Class
- Hi Honey, I'm Home!
- The Man in the Family
- Married People
- My Life and Times
- Stat
- Thirtysomething
- Twin Peaks
- Under Cover

=== CBS ===
Returning series

- 48 Hours
- 60 Minutes
- CBS Sunday Movie
- Davis Rules (moved from ABC)
- Designing Women
- Evening Shade
- Jake and the Fatman
- Knots Landing
- Major Dad
- Murder, She Wrote
- Murphy Brown
- Northern Exposure
- Rescue 911
- Top Cops
- The Trials of Rosie O'Neill

New series

- **2000 Malibu Road** *
- **Bodies of Evidence** *
- **The Boys of Twilight** *
- **Brooklyn Bridge**
- **The Carol Burnett Show**
- **Fish Police** *
- **Freshman Dorm** *
- **Grapevine** *
- **Hearts Are Wild** *
- **Howie** *
- **The Human Factor** *
- **P.S. I Luv U**
- **Palace Guard**
- **Princesses**
- **Raven**
- **The Royal Family**
- **Scorch** *
- **Street Stories with Ed Bradley** *
- **Teech**
- **Tequila and Bonetti** *

Not returning from 1990–91:

- The Antangonists
- Bagdad Café
- Broken Badges
- Dallas
- Doctor Doctor
- E.A.R.T.H. Force
- The Family Man
- The Flash
- Good Sports
- The Hogan Family
- Lenny
- Over My Dead Body
- Paradise
- Sons & Daughters
- True Detectives
- Uncle Buck
- WIOU
- Wiseguy
- You Take the Kids

=== Fox ===
Returning series

- America's Most Wanted
- Beverly Hills, 90210
- Comic Strip Live
- COPS
- FOX Night at the Movies
- Get a Life
- In Living Color
- Married... with Children
- Parker Lewis Can't Lose
- The Simpsons
- The Sunday Comics
- Totally Hidden Video
- True Colors

New series

- **Best of the Worst**
- **Bill & Ted's Excellent Adventures** *
- **Charlie Hoover** *
- **Code 3** *
- **Down the Shore** *
- **Drexell's Class**
- **Freshman Dorm** *
- **Herman's Head**
- **Melrose Place** *
- **Rachel Gunn, R.N.** *
- **Roc**
- **Sightings**
- **Stand By Your Man** *
- **The Ultimate Challenge** *
- **Vinnie & Bobby** *

Not returning from 1990–91:

- Against the Law
- American Chronicles
- Babes
- DEA
- Good Grief
- Haywire
- Top of the Heap
- Yearbook

=== NBC ===
Returning series

- Blossom
- Cheers
- The Cosby Show
- Dear John
- A Different World
- Empty Nest
- The Fresh Prince of Bel-Air
- The Golden Girls
- In the Heat of the Night
- L.A. Law
- Law & Order
- Matlock
- NBC Sunday Night Movie
- The NBC Monday Movie
- Night Court
- Quantum Leap
- Seinfeld
- Sisters
- Unsolved Mysteries
- Wings

New series

- **Against All Odds** *
- **Dateline NBC** *
- **Eerie, Indiana**
- **Flesh 'n' Blood**
- **Home Fires** *
- **Hot Country Nights** *
- **I Witness Video** *
- **I'll Fly Away**
- **Man of the People** *
- **Mann & Machine** *
- **Nightmare Cafe** *
- **Nurses**
- **Pacific Station**
- **Reasonable Doubts**
- **Secret Service** *
- **The Adventures of Mark & Brian**
- **The Fifth Corner** *
- **The Powers That Be** *
- **The Torkelsons**
- **Walter & Emily** *

Not returning from 1990–91:

- The 100 Lives of Black Jack Savage
- Amen
- American Dreamer
- Dark Shadows
- Down Home
- The Fanelli Boys
- Ferris Bueller
- Grand
- Hull High
- Hunter
- Lifestories
- Midnight Caller
- Parenthood
- Real Life with Jane Pauley
- Shannon's Deal
- Sunday Best
- Working It Out

Note: The * indicates that the program was introduced in midseason.
