= John Mariano =

American actor

- Occupation: Actor
- Years active: 1986–present

John Mariano is an American actor who has worked in film, television, animation and nightclubs. He is known for playing tough guys with a comic edge. His ability of physical comedy has been compared to Jerry Lewis and Buster Keaton. Keaton's wife Eleanor was quoted as saying; "He reminded me so much of Buster, it gave me chills". He got his start in films playing a prissy bank teller in Tough Guys with Burt Lancaster and Kirk Douglas. Working steadily in both film and television, he's best remembered on television for playing Johnny the waiter in Caroline in the City with Lea Thompson. A gifted improviser, sketch player and voice-over artist, his impression of Robert De Niro in a sketch entitled "De Niro Sings the Supremes" at The Groundlings, led to him playing a pigeon named Bobby in Animaniacs, who is based on a character played by De Niro in Goodfellas.

== Filmography ==
=== Animation ===
Year	Title	Role	Notes
1990	Wake, Rattle, & Roll	Wally Gator	
1990	Pretty Piggies		Miniseries
1990	Barnyard Commandos		
1991	Toxic Crusaders	Various characters	13 episodes
1991	Teenage Mutant Ninja Turtles	Mondo Gecko	Episode: "Michaelangelo Meets Mondo Gecko"
1991	Where's Waldo?	Various characters	13 episodes
1992	Batman: The Animated Series	Additional Voices	Episode: "Heart of Ice"
1993	The Louie N' Louie Show In: A Seedy Situation	Bubbles	Television film
1993–1998	Animaniacs	Bobby, additional voices	24 episodes
1995–1998	Pinky and the Brain	Robert, Bobby, Head Gendarm	4 episodes
1996–2004	Hey Arnold!	Vic, Morrie, Ray, Zamboni Jones	7 episodes
1996	The Real Adventures of Jonny Quest	C.W.	Episode: "Manhattan Maneater"
1996	The Tick	Sewer Czar	Episode: "The Tick vs. Filth"
1997	Extreme Ghostbusters	Various characters	2 episodes
1997–1999	Men in Black: The Series	Alcidian, Agent D	5 episodes
1998	The Sylvester & Tweety Mysteries	Commandant, Stanislovsky	2 episodes
1998	The New Batman Adventures	Vincenzo	Episode: "Torch Song"
1998–1999	Superman: The Animated Series	Short Order Cook, Agent #3	2 episodes
2000	Batman Beyond	Driver	Episode: "Eyewitness"
2001	The Angry Beavers	Manicoti, Announcer	Episode: "Beavemaster/Deck Poops"
2001	The Legend of Tarzan	Joey Marks	Episode: "Tarzan and One Punch Mullargan"
2002	As Told by Ginger	Delivery Man	Episode: "Tgif"
2003	Ninja Scroll: The Series	Jyashi	Episode: "Jaren dôkoku"
2005	Father of the Pride	Martin Scorsese	Episode: "The Siegfried and Roy Fantasy Experience Movie"
2008	The Batman	Number 1	Episode: "What Goes Up..."
2009	Random! Cartoons	Leonardo Da Vinci	Episode: "Flavio"
2009	Transformers: Animated	Dirt Boss	Episode: "Three's a Crowd"
2010	Fanboy & Chum Chum	Stinks	Episode: "Digital Pet Cemetery/Fanboy Stinks"
2010–2016	The Daltons	Joe Dalton	191 episodes
2010	Batman: The Brave and the Bold	Mobster	Episode: "The Mask of Matches Malone!"
2020	Scooby-Doo and Guess Who?	Angry Italian Man, Sicilian Waiter, Tony Jr.	Episode: "Fear of the Fire Beast!"

=== Live-action ===
Year	Title	Role	Notes
1986	Matlock	Eddie Leeds	Episode: "The Cop"
1988	China Beach	Wakefield	Episode: "Chao Ong"
1989	On the Television	Various characters	Episode: "Our Maid Imelda"
1989	The Unnaturals	Reoccurring characters	
1990	Booker	Tommy Miranda	Episode: "Molly and Eddie"
1991	Who's the Boss?	Repairman	Episode: "An Affair to Forget"
1991	Good & Evil	Whappo	Episode: "Episode #1.4"
1991	L.A. Law	Chet	Episode: "TV or Not TV"
1991–1992	Night Court	Travis Gerkin	3 episodes
1991–1997	Family Matters	Ring Announcer, Stickman	2 episodes
1992	Stand by Your Man		Episode: "The Prowler"
1992	Room for Two	Pizza Guy	Episode: "The Night of the Living Lou"
1992	The Amazing Live Sea-Monkeys	Mr. Snide	Episode: "Top Secret"
1993	Married... with Children	Pete	Episode: "No Ma'am"
1993	Blossom	Dave	Episode: "Big Doings: Part 2"
1994	Unsolved Mysteries	Albert DeSalvo	Episode: "Episode #6.29"
1994	Silk Stalkings	Bobby Vinera	Episode: "Ghosts of the Past"
1995	ER	Leonard Apfenbach	Episode: "Men Plan, God Laughs"
1995	The Crew	Phillip	Episode: "The Dating Game"
1995–1997	Caroline in the City	Johnny, Maitre D'	14 episodes
1996	Life with Roger	John	Episode: "Pilot"
1996	Renegade	Marco Gianelli	Episode: "The Milk Carton Kid"
1997	Pacific Blue	Armand Miller	Episode: "Lost and Found"
1997	Dharma & Greg	Man	Episode: "Pilot"; uncredited
1997–2004	NYPD Blue	Gary Moretti, Morgan Driscoll	2 episodes
1999	JAG	Enrico Amati	Episode: "Soul Searching"
1999–2000	Veronica's Closet	Chris	5 episodes
2000	The Sopranos	Ralph Giorgio	Episode: "Do Not Resuscitate"
2000	18 Wheels of Justice	Nick Giovanni	Episode: "Con Truck"
2000	The West Wing	Beltram	Episode: "Shibboleth"
2001	Cover Me	Stevie Christmas	Episode: "Vegas Mother's Day: Part 2"
2001	Walker, Texas Ranger	Sonny Martone	Episode: "Saturday Night"
2001	Philly	Ray Bolzano	Episode: "Philly Folly"
2003	The Tracy Morgan Show	Actor	Episode: "Haircut Night"
2004	CSI: Miami	Davey Penrod	Episode: "MIA/NYC Nonstop"
2005	Judging Amy	Cemetery Worker #1	Episode: "My Name Is Amy Gray..."
2005	The Bernie Mac Show		Episode: "Prison Break"
2005	Numb3rs	Derrick Lamberg	Episode: "In Plain Sight"; uncredited
2006	The Inside	Keyes	Episode: "Gem"
2006	Desperate Housewives	Oliver Weston	2 episodes
2007	It's Always Sunny in Philadelphia	Johnny	2 episodes
2008	Everybody Hates Chris	Priest	Episode: "Everybody Hates My Man"
2014	Ray Donovan	Security Guard Lambert	Episode: "S.U.C.K."
2015	Hand of God	Earl	Episode: "He So Loved"
2016	Murder in the First	Judge Todd Steinberg	Episode: "Normandy Bitch"
2017	The Deuce		Episode: "Pilot"
2018	The Man in the High Castle	Vince Cippolini	Episode: "Baku"
2020	Young Sheldon	Richard Feynman	Episode: "A Baby Tooth and the Egyptian God of Knowledge"
2020	Bob Hearts Abishola	Gene	Episode: "Straight Outta Lagos"

=== Film ===
Year	Title	Role	Notes
1986	Tough Guys	Teller #2	
1992	The Finishing Touch	Nick Sorvino	
1998	With Friends Like These...	Arthur	
1999	Cool Crime	Roberto	
1999	Animaniacs: Wakko's Wish	Bobby	Voice, direct-to-video
1999	An American Tail: The Mystery of the Night Monster	Twitch	Voice, direct-to-video
1999	A Wake in Providence	Brunie	
2003	Batman: Mystery of the Batwoman	Additional voices	Direct-to-video
2005	Jesus, Mary and Joey	Carlo	
2006	Curious George	Additional voices	
2006	Cattle Call	District Attorney	
2008	Pride and Glory	Task Force Lieutenant	
2008	The Spiderwick Chronicles	Goblins	
2010	Super Hybrid	Additional voices	
2014	Justice League: War	Ice Cream Vendor	Voice, direct-to-video
2014	The Halloween Pranksta	Pranksta	Short
2014	The Big Bad City	Dr. Darin, Dr. Dale	
2015	Dancer and the Dame	Captain Murray	
2016	The Autopsy of Jesus Christ	Mr. Bontempo, Pop	Short
2018	Spinning Man	Jack	
2022	Babylon	Master of Ceremonies	

=== Video games ===
Year	Title	Role	Notes
1998	Animaniacs: Ten Pin Alley	Bobby	
1998	Baldur's Gate	Brage, Kagain, Slythe, Tiax, Tuth	
1999	Y2K: The Game	Mister Deer, Mister Recyclone	
2000	Baldur's Gate II: Shadows of Amn	Tiax. Talon Yarryl. Naljier-Skal	
2000	Escape from Monkey Island	Jojo Jr.. Salty the Bait Shop Owner	
2001	Fallout Tactics: Brotherhood of Steel	Wasteland Bartender Armpit, Psycho Ghoul User, Radar Torch Soldier	
2001	Star Trek: Starfleet Command - Orion Pirates	Additional voices	
2003	Lionheart: Legacy of the Crusader	Additional voices	
2003	Armed & Dangerous	Rexus	
2004	Fallout: Brotherhood of Steel	Wasteland Bartender Armpit, Psycho Ghoul User, Radar Torch Soldier	
2004	EverQuest II	Additional voices	
2004	World of Warcraft	Additional voices	
2005	Robots	Crank	
2005	Call of Duty 2	Additional voices	
2006	Ninety-Nine Nights	Additional voices	
2006	Desperate Housewives: The Game	Pharmacist, Pawnshop Owner	
2006	The Sopranos: Road to Respect	Additional voices	
2008	Tom Clancy's EndWar	Additional voices	
2008	The Godfather II: Crime Rings	Fredo Corleone	
2010	Final Fantasy XIII	Cocoon Inhabitants	
2010	Mafia II	Mike Bruski, El Greco	
2011	Operation Flashpoint: Red River	Marines	
2011	Resistance 3	Freddie Valmore, Radio New York, Running Man	
2012	World of Warcraft: Mists of Pandaria	Additional voices	
2012	Dishonored	Barrister Timsh	
2013	Sly Cooper: Thieves in Time	Jackalope	
2014	Star Wars: The Old Republic - Shadow of Revan	Arankau, Corellian Run Scoundrel, Lumo, Nova Blade Pirate	
2015	Fallout 4	Abbot, Mark Summerset	
