= Almy =

Almy may refer to:

== People ==
- Frank Almy (1857–1893), American convicted murderer, executed by the state of New Hampshire
- Israel T. Almy (1892–1963), American architect
- John J. Almy (1815–1895), U.S. Navy rear admiral
- Mary Almy (1883–1967), American architect
- Mary Gould Almy (1735–1808), diarist during the American Revolution
- Max Almy (born 1948), American artist
- Millie Almy (1915–2001), American psychologist
- Susan Almy (born 1946), American politician

== Other uses ==
- Almy, Wyoming, a ghost town in Uinta County
- Almy Formation, a geological formation in Wyoming
- CM Almy, an American clothing company

== See also ==
- Almay, a cosmetics brand
