= Front Page Magazine =

Front Page Magazine may refer to:

- FrontPage Magazine
- Front Page (newsmagazine)
