= Alicia Brandt =

American actress

- Occupation: Actress
- Years active: 1988–present

Alicia Brandt is a television and film actress. She is best known for roles as Joy Foy in the short lived 1992 sitcom Julie, where she starred together with Julie Andrews and James Farentino, and the main character Trudy in the 1993 independent film Losers in Love. Brandt's other roles include appearances on the television series The Golden Girls, Sister, Maybe This Time, Becker, Six Feet Under, Desperate Housewives and Girlfriends.
