= The Hat Squad =

1992 American crime drama TV series

- Genre: Crime drama
- Written by: Stephen J. Cannell; Bill Nuss
- Directed by: Rob Bowman
- Composer: Mike Post
- Country of origin: United States
- Original language: English
- No. of seasons: 1
- No. of episodes: 13 (2 unaired)

Production
- Executive producers: Stephen J. Cannell; Bill Nuss
- Production location: Vancouver
- Cinematography: Brenton Spencer; Rodney Charters
- Editors: Casey O. Rohrs; Chris G. Willingham; Jimmy Giritlian
- Running time: 1 hour
- Production company: Stephen J. Cannell Productions

Original release
- Network: CBS
- Release: September 16, 1992 – January 23, 1993

The Hat Squad is an American crime drama television series that ran for only one season on CBS from September 16, 1992, to January 23, 1993, during the 1992–1993 season. Thirteen episodes were made, but only 11 of them aired.

== Synopsis ==
Police officer Mike Ragland and his wife Kitty have adopted three boys whose parents' lives were taken by violence; having been told stories about the police "hat squads" of the past, the three boys grew up to become an elite police unit called The Hat Squad, dressed in street clothes and fedoras. They consist of Buddy, who was just a baby when his father died; Rafael, who does not carry a firearm and uses a wide variety of methods to subdue criminals; and Matty, who is studying to become a lawyer.

== Cast ==
- Don Michael Paul as Buddy
- Nestor Serrano as Rafael
- Billy Warlock as Matty
- James Tolkan as Mike Ragland
- Janet Carroll as Kitty Ragland

== Episodes ==
| No. | Title | Directed by | Written by | Original release date | Prod. code |
|---|---|---|---|---|---|
| 1 | "Pilot" | Rob Bowman | Stephen J. Cannell | September 16, 1992 | 48000 |
The Squad's first case involves catching a murderer who is terrorizing the only witness, a young boy.
| 2 | "The Widow Maker" | Rob Bowman | Stephen J. Cannell | September 23, 1992 | 48101 |
Matty is beaten up by a cop who moonlights as a killer. They devise a plan to capture this killer, but things are not a clear-cut as they seem to be.
| 3 | "92 Seconds to Midnight" | Rob Bowman | Bill Nuss | September 30, 1992 | 48102 |
Raffi goes undercover to protect a little girl when her father is forced out of his retirement from crime by a robber planning a two-million-dollar subway heist.
| 4 | "Family Business" | Kim Manners | Stephen J. Cannell | October 28, 1992 | 48105 |
It's a family feud when the Hats clash with a family of extortionists that uses strong-arm tactics. An additional obstacle: saving the family's tormented youngest member from a life of crime.
| 5 | "Phoenix Rising" | Vern Gillum | Charles Grant Craig | November 4, 1992 | 48103 |
The guys must act quickly when a deranged explosives expert escapes from prison and targets Mike, the cop who put him behind bars for murder.
| 6 | "Ten" | Tucker Gates | Charles Grant Craig | November 11, 1992 | 48107 |
Bad brothers blow away Buddy's buddy, leaving a young boy fatherless, so the Hats scramble to confront the hit men before they leave town.
| 7 | "Rest in Peace" | Bruce Kessler | Charles Grant Craig, Bill Nuss | December 9, 1992 | 48109 |
Buddy travels to Las Vegas as he tracks a mob boss he thinks murdered his natural father. But the killer is closer to home, as is someone who has a contract to kill Buddy.
| 8 | "Lifestyles of the Rich and Infamous" | Kim Manners | Bill Nuss | January 2, 1993 | 48106 |
The team must protect a murder witness from a killer who is also the heir to a fortune. Meanwhile, Rafael is mistaken for the "Kissing Bandit."
| 9 | "A Dog's Life" | Rob Bowman | Bill Nuss | January 9, 1993 | 48110 |
Frustrated by a canine capable of detecting smuggled drugs, a drug lord puts a bounty on the dog's life. The DEA sniffs out The Hat Squad to protect the dog, but the brothers can't help but sink their teeth into the larger case.
| 10 | "Dead Man Walking" | Kim Manners | Stephen J. Cannell (s), Charles Grant Craig (t), Bill Nuss (t) | January 16, 1993 | 48113 |
The Hats get a tip from a death row inmate about some bad cops. They must get the evidence against the cops before the cops find them.
| 11 | "The Liquidator" | Brad Turner | Stephen J. Cannell | January 23, 1993 | 48114 |
The Hats are called on to protect a woman from a mob-hired hit man.
| 12 | "Frankie Stein" | Kim Manners | David Greenwalt | Unaired | 48108 |
Matty gets in trouble when he tries to prove that recently released criminal Frankie Stein is committing armed robberies.
| 13 | "The 12th Victim" | N/A | N/A | Unaired | 48115 |
A serial killer threatens a blind psychiatrist, and the team is assigned to protect her.
