= Millie Almy =

American psychologist and early childhood education expert

Millie Almy (June 19, 1915 – August 16, 2001) was an American psychologist, known as the “grand dame of early childhood education.”

Almy was a leader in the field of early childhood education and psychology, and played a critical role in shaping the science of child development. Her research explored how young children understand complex subjects such as science, mathematics and literature. She is credited with popularising the theories of Jean Piaget in the early childhood education field.

When teaching, Almy made sure not to give the students too much information at a time to reduce stress. Millie Almy, the grandame of Early Childhood Education, dies at 86. Teachers College - Columbia University. (2002, January 1). https://www.tc.columbia.edu/articles/2002/january/millie-almy-the-grandame-of-early-childhood-education-dies/

== Early life and education ==
Millie Corinne Almy was born in Clymer, New York, on June 19, 1915. She graduated from Vassar College in 1936, followed by an MA from Teachers College, Columbia University in 1945. She received her PhD in 1948, also from Columbia University Teachers College.

== Career ==
Almy worked in the field of early childhood education for more than forty years. She was on the faculty of Columbia University Teachers College for more than 20 years, as a professor of psychology and education. She joined the University of California, Berkeley, in 1971. Her publications included Young Children's Thinking and Ways of Studying Children. Almy was among the first scholars to advocate for specialist training for teachers in early childhood education.

Almy was an advocate for the importance and transformative power of play for children's cognitive, social and emotional development. She is credited as one of the first American scholars to bring Piagetian theory of cognitive development to the US discourse on early childhood education. Her writings argued that intelligence is not fixed at birth, but rather it emerges as it is nurtured. With each stage of development children can learn and acquire new abilities, which need to be exercised before moving on to more complex subjects in the next stage of development. Her work explained how children come to understand complex subjects through experience and visualisation.

In 1950, Almy participated in the 1950 White House Conference on Children and Youth. In 1980 she was honoured as a distinguished alumna by Teachers College, Columbia University.

Almy had a commitment to day care, and worked in day nurseries in the 1930s and in the Lanham Act Child Care Centers during World War II. She helped to establish an Interdisciplinary Day Care Program at the University of California, Berkeley, in the 1970s.

Almy retired in 1980, and continued to conduct research, including as a Fulbright fellow in New South Wales, Australia, as a visiting professor at Mills College in Oakland, and as a docent at the Oakland Museum of California.
