= The Best of the Worst =

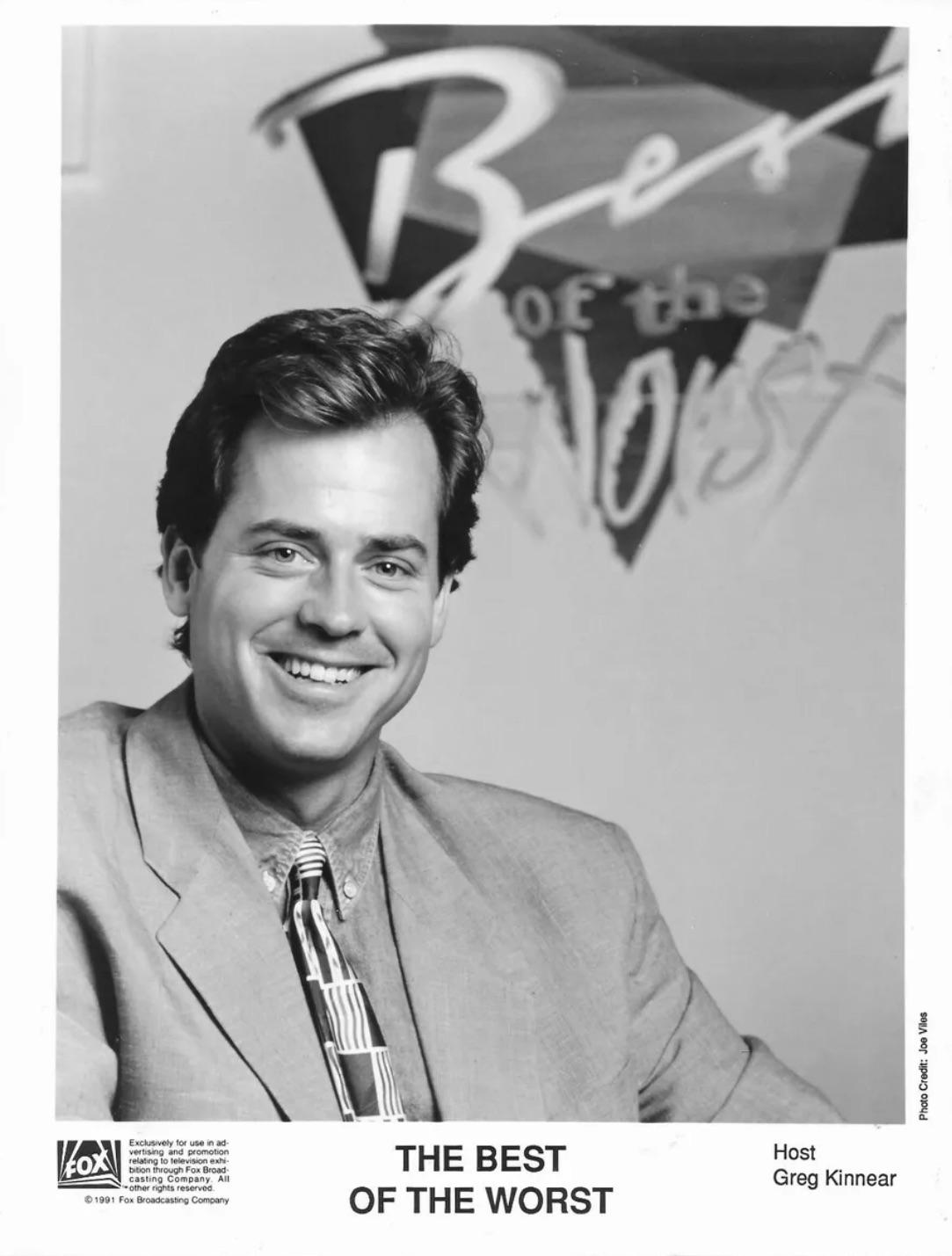
- Presented by: Greg Kinnear

Production
- Running time: 30 minutes

Original release
- Network: Fox
- Release: August 17, 1991 – January 24, 1992

The Best of the Worst is an American television program that was hosted by Greg Kinnear and aired by Fox Broadcasting Company as a part of its 1991–92 schedule.

== Overview ==
The Best of the Worst, hosted by Greg Kinnear, was a lighthearted celebration of the worst elements of life—the worst movies, the worst places to get married, the worst museums, the worst airline food, and the worst Elvis impersonators being only a few of the "worst" examples. There was even a special correspondent reporting from Japan, David Spector, apparently to prove that North America had no monopoly on life's worst things.

Memorable segments included a wacky “beat poet” duo (Charles Stein and George Quasha) who sang in gibberish, an Elvis impersonator convention, rent a witch, and a man who collected roadkill ("the badger always has one arm up almost like it's waving goodbye").

== International Broadcasts and Cancellation ==
The Best of the Worst also screened on New Zealand TV2 in 1992.

Due to its Nielsen ratings the show was cancelled at midseason. It finished last out of 98 shows and only averaged a 4.42 rating.
