= Gabriel's Fire =

- Pilot episode's title card
- Genre: Crime drama
- Created by: Donald R. Boyle; Coleman Luck; Jacqueline Zambrano
- Starring: James Earl Jones; Laila Robins; Brian K. Grant; Dylan Walsh; Madge Sinclair; DeForest Covan
- Composer: William Olvis
- Country of origin: United States
- Original language: English
- No. of seasons: 1
- No. of episodes: 22

Production
- Executive producers: Robert Lieberman; Coleman Luck
- Running time: 60 minutes
- Production companies: Crystal Beach Entertainment; Coleman Luck Productions; Lorimar Television

Original release
- Network: ABC
- Release: September 12, 1990 – June 6, 1991

Related
- Pros and Cons

Gabriel's Fire is an American crime drama television series created by Donald R. Boyle, Coleman Luck and Jacqueline Zambrano that ran on ABC from September 12, 1990, to June 6, 1991, in the United States during the 1990–91 television season. The series starred James Earl Jones, who won an Emmy Award for his performance.

A revamped version of the series, entitled Pros and Cons, aired briefly the following season.

== Overview ==
The main character, Gabriel Bird, was played by James Earl Jones. He was a former Chicago police officer who, over twenty years prior, had been wrongfully sentenced to life imprisonment for the murder of a fellow police officer. In fact, he shot the officer to protect a defenseless mother and child whom the officer was about to murder in cold blood during a 1969 police raid. Unbeknownst to Bird, the raid had been merely a pretext for the police to attack the members of a militant black nationalist organization.

This incident in the character's background was inspired by the 1969 death of Black Panther Party leader Fred Hampton, who was shot and killed during a raid upon his residence conducted by Chicago police and other law enforcement personnel. On the show, the street on which the raid involving Bird had occurred was identified as "Hampton Street".

After serving about twenty years in prison, a human rights lawyer decides to work for his release as his testimony is needed in another case. At first, Bird opposes any attempts to release him, as he became accustomed to life in prison, but after his release takes place against his will, he begins to get used to life as a free person and uses his time away from prison to help other people who are wronged by society or the authorities.

When Bird is released, he starts working as a private detective, hired by the lawyer who had helped free him.

=== Pros and Cons ===
Pros and Cons ran on ABC from September 26, 1991, to January 2, 1992, in the United States during the 1991–92 television season. It is a revamped, more lighthearted version of Gabriel's Fire. Jones and Sinclair reprised their roles as Gabriel and Josephine.

== Characters ==
- James Earl Jones as Gabriel Bird
- Laila Robins as Victoria Heller
- Brian K. Grant as Jamil Duke
- Dylan Walsh as Louis Klein
- Madge Sinclair as "Empress" Josephine Austin
- DeForest Covan as Harry

== Episodes ==
No.	Title	Directed by	Written by	Original release date	Prod. code
1	"Pilot"	Robert Lieberman	Coleman Luck & Jacqueline Zambrano	September 12, 1990	475034
2	"To Catch a Con: Part I"	Jack Sholder	Tom Towler	September 20, 1990	446602
3	"To Catch a Con: Part II"	Jack Sholder	Tom Towler	September 27, 1990	446604
4	"Louis' Date"	Stephen L. Posey	Carol Mendelsohn	October 4, 1990	446603
5	"The Descent"	Dan Lerner	Stephen Zito	October 18, 1990	446605
6	"Money Walks"	Unknown	Unknown	October 25, 1990	446601
7	"The Neighborhood"	Unknown	Unknown	November 1, 1990	446606
8	"I'm Nobody"	Unknown	Unknown	November 8, 1990	446607
9	"The Wind Rancher"	Unknown	Unknown	November 15, 1990	446608
10	"Windows"	Vern Gillum	Unknown	November 29, 1990	446609
11	"Judgements"	Unknown	Unknown	December 6, 1990	446610
12	"Tis the Season"	Unknown	Unknown	December 20, 1990	446611
13	"The Great Waldo"	Unknown	Unknown	January 10, 1991	446612
14	"First Date"	Unknown	Unknown	January 24, 1991	446613
15	"Truth and Consequences"	Unknown	Unknown	January 31, 1991	446614
16	"Finger on the Trigger"	Unknown	Unknown	February 14, 1991	446615
17	"Postcards from the Faultline"	Unknown	Unknown	February 21, 1991	446616
18	"A Prayer for the Goldsteins"	Robert Lieberman	Julie Sayres	March 7, 1991	446617
19	"One Flew Over the Bird's Nest"	Unknown	Unknown	April 17, 1991	446618
20	"Kelly Green"	Unknown	Unknown	April 24, 1991	446619
21	"Birds Gotta Fly"	Unknown	Unknown	May 1, 1991	446621
22	"Belly of the Beast"	Mark Sobel	Charles Pratt, Jr.	June 6, 1991	446620

== Awards ==
- James Earl Jones
  - Emmy Award for Outstanding Lead Actor in a Drama Series (1991)
  - Image Award for Outstanding Lead Actor in a Drama Series, Mini-Series or Television Movie (1993)
- Madge Sinclair
  - Emmy Award for Outstanding Supporting Actress in a Drama Series (1991)
- David Opatoshu
  - Emmy Award for Outstanding Guest Actor in a Drama Series (1991); playing Max Goldstein in the episode "A Prayer for the Goldsteins"
