= Palace Guard =

- Genre: Crime drama
- Created by: Stephen J. Cannell
- Starring: D. W. Moffett; Marcy Walker; Tony Lo Bianco
- Composer: Mike Post
- Country of origin: United States
- Original language: English
- No. of seasons: 1
- No. of episodes: 8 (including a feature-length pilot, 5 unaired)

Production
- Executive producers: Jacob Epstein; Ken Solarz; Stephen J. Cannell
- Running time: 60 minutes per episode
- Production company: Stephen J. Cannell Productions

Original release
- Network: CBS
- Release: October 18 – November 1, 1991

Palace Guard is an American crime drama television series that was briefly broadcast by CBS from October 18 to November 1, 1991, as part of its 1991 fall lineup. It was produced by Stephen J. Cannell.

== Synopsis ==
Palace Guard is the story of a reformed jewel thief and cat burglar, Tommy Logan (D. W. Moffett), who, after serving three years in prison, is released on parole and accepts an offer to become the head of security for the posh Palace Hotel chain. There are two reasons for this somewhat unusual job offer: Logan had previously enjoyed great success in stealing from the high-class clientele of the Palace chain, and therefore he would understand how to prevent others from doing so; and Tommy was the illegitimate son of the chain's owner, Arturo Taft (Tony Lo Bianco), though Taft did not reveal this to Logan. The show centers primarily around the working relationship between Logan and his new boss, Christy Cooper (Marcy Walker), the hotel chain's vice-president of Public Relations. In each episode, Logan and Cooper travel to a hotel in a different city where Logan helps avert some disaster using quirky and questionable methods, leaving Cooper to sweep up the fallout.

== Cast ==
- D. W. Moffett as Tommy Logan
- Tony Lo Bianco as Arturo Taft
- Marcy Walker as Christy Cooper

== Episodes ==
No.	Title	Directed by	Written by	Original release date
1 2	"Pilot"	James A. Contner	Stephen J. Cannell	October 18, 1991
3	"The Three-Minute Egg"	Frank E. Johnson	Stephen J. Cannell	October 25, 1991
4	"Simian Enchanted Evening"	Charles Siebert	Jacob Epstein & Kel Solarz	November 1, 1991
5	"Eye of Newt"	Gabrielle Beaumont & Charles Sibert	Jacob Epstein & Ken Solarz	Unaired
6	"House Arrest"	Nick Marck	Howard Chaykin & John Francis Moore	Unaired
7	"The White Angel"	George D'Amato	Jacob Epstein & Marjorie David	Unaired
8	"Iced"	Matthew Meshekoff	Stephen J. Cannell	Unaired
9	"Memories"	Zale Dalen	Ken Solarz & Marjorie David	Unaired

== Broadcast ==
Palace Guard was broadcast by CBS from October 18 to November 1, 1991. Counting the show's feature-length pilot, only three of the eight completed episodes of Palace Guard were aired on CBS.

== Home media ==
In July 2010, Mill Creek Entertainment released Prime Time Crime: The Stephen J. Cannell Collection on DVD in Region 1. This special collection contained 54 episodes from 13 different shows produced by Stephen J. Cannell Productions including all nine episodes of Palace Guard.
