= Flesh 'n' Blood (TV series) =

- Genre: Sitcom
- Created by: Michael J. DiGaetano; Lawrence Gay
- Written by: Rick Copp; Michael J. Di Gaetano; Lawrence Gay; David A. Goodman; Daniel Palladino; Jeanne Romano
- Directed by: Noam Pitlik
- Starring: David Keith; Lisa Darr; Meghan Andrews; Perry Anzilotti; Peri Gilpin
- Theme music composer: David Keith; Leon Russell
- Composer: Howard Pearl
- Country of origin: United States
- Original language: English
- No. of seasons: 1
- No. of episodes: 12 (4 unaired)

Production
- Executive producers: Michael J. Di Gaetano; Ken Estin; Lawrence Gay; Fran McConnell
- Producers: Bruce Johnson; Daniel Palladino
- Cinematography: Peter Smokler
- Editors: Robert Bramwell; Mike Wilcox
- Camera setup: Multi-camera
- Running time: 30 minutes
- Production companies: Triangle Entertainment; Lavish Productions; Tailfin Productions; Paramount Television

Original release
- Network: NBC
- Release: September 19 – November 15, 1991

Flesh 'n' Blood is an American sitcom television series created by Michael J. DiGaetano and Lawrence Gay. It aired on NBC from September 19 to November 15, 1991, as part of its 1991 fall lineup.

== Synopsis ==
Flesh 'n' Blood is the story of Baltimore Assistant District Attorney Rachel Brennan (Lisa Darr), an attractive, driven young woman who had almost everything, including overwhelming political ambition and the talent to back it up. The one major thing which she lacked was her birth family – she was acutely aware of how her birth mother had put her up for adoption, and longed to meet her.

While Rachel's birth mother didn't miraculously turn up during this program's brief run, someone else did, namely Arlo Weed (David Keith), a Southern redneck and something of a con man. Claiming to be Rachel's brother, Arlo was a widower with three children who made himself at home in Rachel's home and in her life, spicing it up with his homely aphorisms and general manner of rural conviviality. Other characters included Rachel's ambitious investigator, Marty Travers (among his ambitions were to be romantically involved with Rachel and to be governor of Maryland; both were hampered by his extremely diminutive stature; he was portrayed by actor Perry Anzilotti), and Irene (Peri Gilpin), Rachel's secretary who soon developed designs on Arlo. Whether anything was to become of these schemes is unknown; Flesh 'n' Blood was not successful in attracting an audience and was cancelled less than two months after its premiere.

== Cast ==
- Perry Anzilotti.....Marty Travers
- Lisa Darr.....Rachel Brennan
- Chris Stacy.....King Weed
- Meghan Andrews.....Beauty Weed
- David Keith.....Arlo Weed
- Peri Gilpin.....Irene

== Episodes ==
No.	Title	Directed by	Written by	Original release date
1	"Blood is Thicker Than Arlo"	James Burrows	Lawrence Gay & Michael J. DiGaetano	September 19, 1991
In the series pilot, ADA Rachel Brennan's down-home brother Arlo comes to town---and promptly scares away a murder witness.
2	"Tall, Dark and Wanted in Four States"	Noam Pitlik	Lawrence Gay & Michael J. DiGaetano	September 20, 1991
Rachel has a date with a handsome summons server (Parker Stevenson), but Arlo thinks that the guy should be serving time---for murder.
3	"Working Class Zero"	Noam Pitlik	Daniel Palladino	September 27, 1991
Rachel suggests that Arlo get a job, which he does--in her office.
4	"King's Strings"	Noam Pitlik	Ken Estin	October 4, 1991
When Rachel discovers that King is a violin virtuoso, she pulls strings to get him an audition.
5	"Pulling Out the Weeds"	Noam Pitlik	Jeanne Romano	October 25, 1991
Rachel edits out Arlo and the kids when she's profiled for a magazine.
6	"Arlo and Starr"	Noam Pitlik	Daniel Palladino	November 1, 1991
Kirstie Alley appears as Arlo's ex-girlfriend, whose orbit has brought her back to Arlo, looking for love, or revenge, or both.
7	"It's My Birthday and I'll Lie If I Want To"	Noam Pitlik	Robert Horn & Daniel Margosis	November 8, 1991
Arlo promises not to throw Rachel a birthday party, but she's surprised when his gift of her birth certificate reveals she's two years older.
8	"The Wrath of Con"	Noam Pitlik	Jeanne Romano	November 15, 1991
Arlo is stung when he discovers that an old friend, a retired con man, is back to fleecing people and has pulled the wool over his eyes. Leslie Nielsen and John Dullaghan guest star.
9	"Love is a Many Splendored Thing"	Noam Pitlik	Nastaran Dibai & Jeffrey B. Hodes	UNAIRED
10	"Beauty Is in the Eye of the Ticketholder"	Noam Pitlik	Rick Copp & David A. Goodman	UNAIRED
11	"Mommie Nearest"	Noam Pitlik	Michael J. DiGaetano & Lawrence Gay	UNAIRED
Brenda Vaccaro guest stars.
12	"Bebe's Wedding"	Rod Daniel	Rick Copp & David A. Goodman	UNAIRED

== Awards and nominations ==
Year	Award	Result	Category	Recipient
1991	Young Artist Awards	Nominated	Best Young Actress Starring in a New Television Series	Meghan Andrews

== Bibliography ==
- Tim Brooks and Earle Marsh, The Complete Directory to Prime Time Network and Cable TV Shows 1946–Present, Ninth edition (New York: Ballantine Books, 2007) ISBN 978-0-345-49773-4
