= P.S. I Luv U =

American crime drama television series

- Genre: Crime drama
- Created by: Glen A. Larson; Bob Shayne
- Starring: Greg Evigan; Connie Sellecca; Earl Holliman
- Theme music composer: Matthew Delgado; Glen A. Larson
- Opening theme: "P.S. I Luv U" performed by Greg Evigan and Suzanne Fountain
- Composers: Rocky Davis; Dave Fisher; Kevin Gilbert
- Country of origin: United States
- Original language: English
- No. of seasons: 1
- No. of episodes: 13

Production
- Executive producer: Glen A. Larson
- Producers: Bob Shayne; Gail Morgan Hickman
- Cinematography: Robert Hayes
- Editor: David Howe
- Running time: 45–48 minutes
- Production companies: Glen Larson Productions; CBS Entertainment Productions

Original release
- Network: CBS
- Release: September 15, 1991 – January 4, 1992

P.S. I Luv U is an American crime drama television series that aired on CBS from September 15, 1991, to January 4, 1992, as a part of its 1991–92 schedule. The title derived from the phone number of fictitious Palm Security and Investigations, which was 774-5888, which can be reached by dialing "PSI-LUVU" on a standard North American telephone.

== Synopsis ==
P.S. I Luv U is the story of two people who had been working together in a failed New York Police Department "sting" operation. Joey Paciorek (Greg Evigan) was a policeman, while Wanda Tallbert (Connie Sellecca) was a con woman who was working with the police only as part of an agreement which was to keep her out of prison. As the failed sting involved organized crime, when it fell through it became necessary to place both of them in the witness protection program.

Posing as married couple Cody and Dani Powell, the two were placed for employment at Palm Security and Investigations in Palm Springs, California, a private detective agency owned by Matthew Durning (Earl Holliman), who was the only person outside of the government who knew who they really were. Occasionally seen during the series' run was Sonny Bono, who was at the time the real life mayor of Palm Springs. The series was cancelled at midseason.

== Episodes ==
No.	Title	Directed by	Written by	Original release date
1	"Pilot"	Peter H. Hunt	Story by : Glen A. Larson; Teleplay by : Glen A. Larson & Bob Shayne	September 15, 1991
2	"Smile, You're Dead"	Mike Vejar	Glen A. Larson	September 21, 1991
3	"The Honeymooners"	Lee H. Katzin	Glen A. Larson & Bruce Kalish	September 28, 1991
4	"No Thanks for the Memories"	Bruce Bilson	Story by : Glen A. Larson & Gail Morgan Hickman; Teleplay by : Gail Morgan Hickman	October 5, 1991
After a head injury leaves Wanda amnesiac, she believes her cover story is the truth and that she really is a dutiful housewife.
5	"Diamonds Are a Girl's Worst Friend"	Ron Satlof	Stephen A. Miller	November 2, 1991
6	"Unmarried...with Children"	Jerry Thorpe	Stephen A. Miller & Glen A. Larson	November 9, 1991
7	"What's Up, Bugsy?"	Burt Brinckerhoff	Bob Shayne	November 16, 1991
8	"An Eye for an Eye"	David Nutter	Maurice Hurley	November 30, 1991
9	"Where There's a Will, There's a Dani"	Jefferson Kibbee	Gail Morgan Hickman	December 7, 1991
10	"I'd Kill to Direct"	David Nutter	Michael Sloan	December 14, 1991
11	"There Goes the Neighborhood"	Peter H. Hunt	Bob Shayne	December 21, 1991
12	"A Bundle of Trouble"	Jefferson Kibbee	Gail Morgan Hickman	January 2, 1992
13	"The Chameleon"	Peter H. Hunt	Stephen A. Miller & Reuben Leder	January 4, 1992
