= Pros and Cons (TV series) =

- Genre: Crime drama
- Created by: Donald R. Boyle; Grenville Case; J. Rae Fox; George Schenck; Frank Cardea
- Starring: James Earl Jones; Madge Sinclair; Richard Crenna
- Composer: William Olvis
- Country of origin: United States
- Original language: English
- No. of seasons: 1
- No. of episodes: 12

Production
- Executive producers: Frank Cardea; George Scheneck
- Running time: 60 minutes
- Production companies: Schenck/Cardea Productions; Lorimar Television

Original release
- Network: ABC
- Release: September 26, 1991 – January 2, 1992

Related
- Gabriel's Fire

Pros and Cons is an American crime drama television series that ran on ABC from September 26, 1991 to January 2, 1992, in the United States during the 1991–92 television season. It is a revamped, more lighthearted version of Gabriel's Fire, which aired on ABC the previous season.

== Overview ==
Gabriel Bird is a former Chicago police officer, who, over twenty years prior, had been wrongfully sentenced to life imprisonment for the murder of a fellow officer. He was exonerated and subsequently became a Chicago private detective (as seen on Gabriel's Fire). Bird then moves to Los Angeles, where he teams up with another private eye, Mitch O'Hannon. Bird also marries his love interest, Josephine, She had been the proprietress of a café where Bird had begun frequenting shortly after his release, at first for her good, homestyle cooking, but soon, primarily for her companionship.

The episode "Birds Gotta Fly", directed by Mario Van Peebles, starred Irene Cara as Bird's estranged daughter Celine, as well as movie and TV personality Michael Beach as Josephine's military-bound son, and Meagan Good in a small role.

When the revamped version of Gabriel's Fire was announced, its original working title was Bird & Katt, as Crenna's character was first named Peter Katt in development. After further revision of the new format, Peter Katt became Mitch O'Hannon and the producers settled on the title Pros and Cons, which had a dual meaning—not only that of the positives and negatives of the two leads working together, but of the fact that they were professional detectives often chasing after convicts.

== Characters ==
- James Earl Jones as Gabriel Bird
- Richard Crenna as Mitch O'Hannon
- Madge Sinclair as Josephine

== Episodes ==
No.	Title	Directed by	Written by	Original release date	Prod. code
1	"Fire and Ice"	Eric Laneuville	George Schenck & Frank Cardea	Unaired	447300
2	"Dead Men Don't Check Out"	Unknown	Unknown	September 26, 1991	447301
3	"Rookie Mistake"	Vern Gillum	Tony Blake & Paul Jackson	October 3, 1991	447302
4	"It's the Pictures That Got Small"	Unknown	Unknown	October 10, 1991	447303
5	"Stand Up"	Unknown	Unknown	October 17, 1991	447304
6	"Double Identity"	Unknown	Unknown	October 31, 1991	447305
7	"Murder Most Perfect"	Paul Krasny	George Schenck & Frank Cardea	November 7, 1991	447306
8	"Once a Kid"	Unknown	Unknown	November 14, 1991	447307
9	"May the Best Man Win"	Unknown	Unknown	November 28, 1991	447308
10	"Scarlet Biretta"	Unknown	Unknown	December 12, 1991	447309
11	"Ho! Ho! Hold Up!"	Jerry Thorpe	Tom Chehak	December 19, 1991	447310
12	"The Ex Spots the Mark"	Vincent McEveety	Tony Blake & Paul Jackson	January 2, 1992	447311
