= Sibs =

- Genre: Sitcom
- Created by: Heide Perlman
- Starring: Marsha Mason; Alex Rocco; Jami Gertz; Dan Castellaneta; Margaret Colin
- Theme music composer: George Clinton
- Opening theme: "Blood's Thicker Than Mud"
- Composer: Mik Muhlfriedel
- Country of origin: United States
- Original language: English
- No. of seasons: 1
- No. of episodes: 22 (12 unaired)

Production
- Executive producers: James L. Brooks; Heide Perlman; Sam Simon
- Producers: Richard Sakai; Ted Bessell; Larina Jean Adamson
- Camera setup: Multi-camera
- Running time: 30 minutes
- Production companies: Gracie Films; Columbia Pictures Television

Original release
- Network: ABC
- Release: September 17, 1991 – April 29, 1992

Related
- The Tracey Ullman Show (1987–1990); The Simpsons (1989–present)

Sibs is an American sitcom broadcast by ABC from September 17, 1991, until April 29, 1992. The series chronicled the relationship of three sisters, and the support the youngest two especially needed from their eldest married sister.Sibs was created by Heide Perlman and executive-produced by Perlman, James L. Brooks and Sam Simon, all of whom had been showrunners of Fox's The Tracey Ullman Show. The series was produced by Brooks' Gracie Films company and Columbia Pictures Television.

== Synopsis ==
Sibs starred Marsha Mason as Nora Ruscio, a successful accountant and Alex Rocco as her long-suffering husband, Howie. The source of most of Howie's frustration was his wife's younger sisters (the siblings, or "sibs", of the title), Audie (Margaret Colin) and Lily (Jami Gertz). Audie was a real estate agent and hence almost unemployed in the era's weak market; she was also recovering from a recent bout of alcoholism. Lily had just been dumped by her boyfriend, who had fled to Germany without her, and had a host of other problems. Both sisters brought all of their problems to Nora, continuing a pattern that had apparently begun when they were all children. In the beginning of the pilot, Nora was distraught after just having learned that the head of her accounting firm had died. Nora's late boss had left the firm to his boorish, whiny nephew Warren Morris (Dan Castellaneta), who was another ongoing character. Shortly after inheriting his uncle's firm, Warren had fired Nora, only to learn that she was the one most of the client base had trusted, and that most of them left with her. He was now unemployed and constantly begging Nora for a job.

The original title proposed for the series was Grown-ups.

== Cast ==
- Marsha Mason as Nora Ruscio
- Alex Rocco as Howie Ruscio
- Jami Gertz as Lily Ruscio
- Dan Castellaneta as Warren Morris
- Margaret Colin as Audie Ruscio

== Episodes ==
No.	Title	Directed by	Written by	Original release date	Prod. code	Viewers (millions)
1	"The Naked and the Damned"	Ted Bessell	Heide Perlman	September 17, 1991	92-001	20.2
2	"Audie's Bad Day"	Ted Bessell	Dick Blasucci & Marc Flanagan	September 25, 1991	92-002	18.5
3	"Warren: The Final Days"	Ted Bessell	Jay Kogen & Wallace Wolodarsky	October 2, 1991	92-003	14.0
4	"The Big Hurt"	Ted Bessell	Dinah Kirgo	October 9, 1991	92-004	15.2
5	"The Gift"	Ted Bessell	Heide Perlman & Sam Simon	October 16, 1991	92-005	14.0
6	"Financial Affairs"	Ted Bessell	Frank Mula	October 23, 1991	92-006	13.6
7	"The Cut Off"	Ted Bessell	David M. Stern	October 30, 1991	92-008	14.6
8	"Audie's Great Guy"	Ted Bessell	Heide Perlman	April 15, 1992	92-010	13.2
9	"Warren and the Married Woman"	Ted Bessell	Howard Gerwitz	April 22, 1992	92-017	10.7
10	"External Revenue"	Ted Bessell	Robin Riordan	April 29, 1992	92-013	9.9
11	"The In Crowd"	Ted Bessell	Elaine Arata	Unaired	92-016	N/A
12	"It Came from Vermont"	Ted Bessell	Robin Riordan	Unaired	92-007	N/A
13	"Honey, I Shrunk My Head"	Ted Bessell	Nell Scovell	Unaired	92-009	N/A
14	"The Best Years of My Life"	Sam Simon	Dick Blasucci & Marc Flanagan	Unaired	92-011	N/A
15	"Lily Makes a Move"	Ted Bessell	Howard Gewirtz	Unaired	92-012	N/A
16	"The Patience of St. Audrey"	Ted Bessell	Heide Pearlman	Unaired	92-014	N/A
17	"I'll Take Manhattan"	Ted Bessell	Jeff Cohn & Neil Alan Levy	Unaired	92-015	N/A
18	"What Makes Lily Run?"	Ted Bessell	Robin Riordan	Unaired	92-018	N/A
19	"The Eleanor Roosevelt Story"	Ted Bessell	Frank Mula	Unaired	92-019	N/A
20	"If I Only Had a Dad"	Ted Bessell	Gina Wendkos	Unaired	92-020	N/A
21	"The Crash: Part 1"	Ted Bessell	Heide Perlman	Unaired	92-021	N/A
22	"The Crash: Part 2"	Ted Bessell	Heide Perlman	Unaired	92-022	N/A

== Broadcast ==
Main cast of Sibs.

Sibs premiered as a preview telecast on Tuesday, September 17, 1991, at 9:30/8:30c, utilizing a lead-in from Roseanne and airing one hour after the series premiere of Home Improvement. The following night, the show began airing in its regular Wednesday 9:30/8:30c time period, kicking off the latter half of the three-hour Wednesday comedy block that ABC was promoting as The Hump.

Ultimately, Sibs had very little appeal to a mass audience, and garnered weak ratings in its first month on the air. The series' low ratings adversely affected the shows that followed it, Anything but Love and Good & Evil, another freshman comedy, which, in its own right, was struggling due to its 10:30/9:30c scheduling and controversy over its storylines. Sibs was put on hiatus in late October 1991 as the three-hour sitcom block was discontinued (Anything but Love moved into Sibs' time slot, while Good & Evil was canceled). Three more episodes were aired by ABC in April 1992, on Wednesdays at 9:30/8:30c, and the series was officially canceled during May 1992 upfronts.

== After cancellation: Related by Birth ==
In 1993, a year after the series' cancellation, Heide Perlman proposed a new comedy pilot for ABC which was a re-conceived version of Sibs. Perlman was successful in having Margaret Colin, Jami Gertz and Dan Castellaneta participate in the new pilot, in which all reprised their Sibs characters of Audie, Lily and Warren respectively. ABC greenlighted the pilot, titled Related by Birth, and it was produced later that year. This incarnation focused on the close relationship of sisters Audie and Lily, with no mention as to the existence of older sister Nora or brother-in-law Howie (as Marsha Mason and Alex Rocco declined to appear in this project). Audie, who had been cynical and icy in Sibs, exhibited a softer personality in this version, whereas Lily was portrayed as more neurotic. Warren, whose character had also become more subdued, was a companion of the girls, while the new supporting cast included Mark Nassar as Audie's frantic, entrepreneurial boss Michael Brickman and Grayson McCouch as Henry, Lily's assistant in a catering business. ABC aired Related by Birth as a summer pilot special on July 2, 1994, but passed on developing the project into a weekly series.

== Bilbliography ==
- Tim Brooks and Earle Marsh, The Complete Directory to Prime Time Network and Cable TV Shows 1946–Present, Ninth edition (New York: Ballantine Books, 2007) ISBN 978-0-345-49773-4
