= CM Almy =

American clothing company

- Industry: clerical clothing
- Founded: 1892
- Founder: Clarence Mortimer Almy; James Almy
- Headquarters: Tulsa, Oklahoma
- Area served: Episcopal, Roman Catholic, Lutheran, Presbyterian
- Products: church supplies; catholic vestments; clergy apparel
- Website: www.almy.com

CM Almy is an American producer of clerical clothing founded in 1892 that serves mainly Episcopal, Lutheran, and Roman Catholic ministries. It is currently a division of F.C. Ziegler Co. based in Tulsa, Oklahoma. It is one of the largest and oldest producers of clerical clothing in the United States. Cardinal Timothy Dolan and the St. Patrick's Cathedral priests are clients.

== Corporate structure ==
CM Almy is a division of the F.C. Ziegler Co. based in Tulsa, Oklahoma, having been acquired in late 2023. CM Almy manufacturing takes place in Pittsfield, Maine.

== History ==
C. M. Almy & Son, Inc. was founded in New York City in 1892 by English master tailor Clarence Mortimer Almy and his son James. In 1929 James's cousin Donald Fendler took over the firm and guided it through the Depression and World War II. After the war, Donald was joined by his sons Thomas and Ryan who moved the shop to the town of Pittsfield, Maine. Today, CM Almy is a division of the F.C. Ziegler Co.

In 2012, CM Almy began researching into the needs of its female clients. They bought samples and looked at womenswear catalogs and hired a designer to sketch looks. They had the Rev. Anisa Cottrell in the Episcopal Diocese in Lexington, Kentucky advising. The result is that for fall 2013, They introduced a line of four new shirts made of stretchy knit for female clerics.
