= Max Almy =

American artist (born 1948)

- Born: 1948 (age 77–78); Omaha, Nebraska
- Known for: Video art Installation art
- Website: www.maxalmy-teriyarbrow.com

Max Almy (born 1948) is an American video, digital media, and installation artist.

Almy was born in 1948 in Omaha, Nebraska. She received her Bachelor of Fine Arts from the University of Nebraska–Lincoln in 1970. She studied at the University of Minnesota in St. Paul, Minnesota and received her Master of Fine Arts from California College of Arts and Crafts, Oakland, California, in 1978.

In the 1980s, Almy used video advertising techniques to comment on television and society. Her work was included in the touring exhibition Making Their Mark: Women Artists Move into the Mainstream, 1970-1985.

Almy collaborates with the painter Teri Yarbrow on projects that include site-specific installations. In 1994, she and Yarbrow were awarded the 1993 News & Documentary Emmy Award in Graphic Design for their work on the Fox Broadcasting Company news program Front Page.
