= Man of the People (TV series) =

American sitcom television series

- Genre: Sitcom
- Created by: R. J. Stewart
- Starring: James Garner; Kate Mulgrew
- Composer: Steve Tyrell
- Country of origin: United States
- Original language: English
- No. of seasons: 1
- No. of episodes: 12 (2 unaired) (list of episodes)

Production
- Executive producers: R. J. Stewart; Gary Hoffman; Neal Israel; John Baskin; Roger Schulman
- Producers: David Latt; Marvin Miller; George Beckerman
- Camera setup: Single-camera
- Running time: 30 minutes
- Production companies: Neal and Gary Productions; NBC Productions

Original release
- Network: NBC
- Release: September 15, 1991 – July 13, 1992

Man of the People is an American sitcom television series created by R.J. Stewart, starring James Garner that aired from September 15, 1991 to July 13, 1992. The supporting cast features Kate Mulgrew. The final two episodes of the series were produced but never broadcast.

Garner called the series "short lived and rightly so."

== Premise ==
A small-time womanizing grifter becomes a big hit with his constituents when he is appointed to city council after the death of his ex-wife. The city's mayor, Lisbeth Chardin, appoints him to the role assuming he will fail and finally get what he deserves. He is constantly at odds with Lisbeth, as well as his ex-wife's employee, Constance, who don't approve of his slimy methods of getting things accomplished.

== Cast ==
- James Garner as Jim Doyle
- Kate Mulgrew as Mayor Lisbeth Chardin
- Corinne Bohrer as Constance Leroy
- George Wyner as Art Louie
- Romy Walthall as Rita
- Taylor Nichols as Richard Lawrence

== Episodes ==
No.	Title	Directed by	Written by	Original release date
1	"Pilot"	Thomas Schlamme	R.J. Stewart	September 15, 1991
Jim is asked to fill in for his ex-wife at the city council.
2	"Remembrance of Flings Past"	Steve Dubin	John Baskin & Roger Shulman	September 22, 1991
If Doyle can get the owner of a golf course back with his old flame, he gets a free membership to the golf course.
3	"A Day in the Life (a.k.a. The Pool Hall)"	Neal Israel	George Beckerman	September 29, 1991
A man is planning to jump off city hall.
4	"Here's to You, Mrs. Lawrence"	Bill Bixby	Virginia K. Hegge & Christopher Vane	October 6, 1991
Doyle is interested in Richard's mother.
5	"Of Cars and Kids and Cads"	Neal Israel	R.J. Stewart	October 13, 1991
Jim gambles a youth center's funds in order to beat an Ivy League snob at poker.
6	"Sleeping with the Enemy"	Bill Bixby	David M. Wolf	October 20, 1991
The press discovers that a political figure has been staying out all night.
7	"Kid of the People"	James Hayman	Sean Clark	October 27, 1991
Doyle meets a child who is exactly like him.
8	"Mr. Doyle Goes to Vegas: Part 1"	Bill Bixby	Story by : Sean Clark; Teleplay by : Roger Shulman & John Baskin & R.J. Stewart	December 6, 1991
9	"Mr. Doyle Goes to Vegas: Part 2"	Bill Bixby	Story by : David M. Wolf; Teleplay by : George Beckerman & Virginia K. Hegge & Christopher Vane	December 6, 1991
Doyle goes to a mayors convention in Las Vegas.
10	"The Freeway Issue (a.k.a. Road to Ruin)"	Nick Marck	Virginia K. Hegge & Christopher Vane	July 13, 1992
Doyle skips an important council vote for a game of pool.
11	"Help, I Need Somebody"	TBD	TBD	UNAIRED
12	"Lemon Aid"	TBD	TBD	UNAIRED
