= Secret Service (American TV series) =

Television series

- Genre: Action drama
- Developed by: Ron Malfi
- Directed by: Gilbert M. Shilton; George Mendeluk
- Narrated by: Steven Ford
- Composer: Domenic Troiano
- Country of origin: United States
- Original language: English
- No. of seasons: 1
- No. of episodes: 22

Production
- Executive producers: Sonny Grosso; Larry Jacobson
- Producer: Jonathan Hackett
- Editors: Dean Balser; Mike Lee
- Running time: 60 min.
- Production companies: Grosso Jacobson; NBC Productions; Skyvision Entertainment

Original release
- Network: NBC
- Release: August 16, 1992 – June 23, 1993

Secret Service is an American action drama television series created by Gilbert M. Shilton and George Mendeluk, which premiered on NBC on August 16, 1992, and ended on June 23, 1993, with a total of 22 episodes. The show was a re-enactment of real Secret Service cases and was hosted by Steven Ford, the youngest son of former United States President Gerald Ford and First Lady Betty Ford.

== Episode titles ==
Overview of Secret Service episodes
| No. | Title | Airdate |
|---|---|---|
| 1 | The Stalker / The Logic Bomb / Protective Mission | 1992.08.16 |
| 2 | The Moneymaker / Calling Cards | 1992.08.23 |
| 3 | Blood Money / Fire and Ice | 1992.09.13 |
| 4 | The Banker and the Belle / Car Wars | 1992.09.20 |
| 5 | A Teller of Tales / Food for Thought | 1992.09.27 |
| 6 | Something for Nothing / The Amateur | 1992.10.04 |
| 7 | Curiosity Killed the Cat / Murder, He Broke | 1992.10.25 |
| 8 | Larceny Inc. / Reach Out and Rob Someone / Jet Threat / Desert Scam | 1992.11.08 |
| 9 | FALN / A Rogue by Any Other Name | 1992.11.22 |
| 10 | It's in the Mail / Counterfeit Murder | 1992.11.29 |
| 11 | Tattoo Arms and the Man | 1992.12.06 |
| 12 | The High Cost of Loving | 1992.12.20 |
| 13 | Murder for Hire / Don't Bank on It | 1993.01.03 |
| 14 | Social Insecurity / Inside Job | 1993.01.24 |
| 15 | Programmer / Child's Play | 1993.02.07 |
| 16 | Brothers in Arms / The 100 Club | 1993.02.14 |
| 17 | The Vet / Murder with Extra Cheese | 1993.02.19 |
| 18 | Lone-Star Sting / The White Guard | 1993.03.19 |
| 19 | Imposters | 1993.04.16 |
| 20 | The Assassin | 1993.04.30 |
| 21 | Gentlemen Prefer Bonds / The IDs of March | 1993.05.28 |
| 22 | Advertising for Crime / Special Delivery | 1993.06.23 |
