= Howie (TV series) =

- Starring: Howie Mandel
- Country of origin: United States
- Original language: English

Production
- Executive producers: Howie Mandel; Michael Rotenberg; Peter Sussman
- Producer: Morris Abraham
- Running time: 30 minutes

Original release
- Network: CBS
- Release: July 1 – July 22, 1992

Howie is an American variety/sketch comedy television series starring Howie Mandel that aired on CBS from July 1 to July 22, 1992.

== Summary ==
The series consisted of sketches involving Mandel and the other series regulars as well as footage from his stage performances at the Celebrity Theater in Anaheim, California.

== Regulars ==
- Howie Mandel
- Shirley Green
- Paul Ebejer
- Gilbert Gottfried
- Clarence Clemons
- Lita Ford
- Quiddlers

== Guests ==
- Robert Goulet
- Billy Joel
- Jackie Mason
- Little Richard
- Gary Busey
