= Front Page (newsmagazine) =

American television program on Fox

Front Page was a newsmagazine that ran in 1993 on the Fox television network in the United States. It featured five main hosts and reporters: Andria Hall, Tony Harris, Vicki Liviakis, Josh Mankiewicz, and Ron Reagan. It ran on Saturday evenings.

== History ==
With the Fox network expanding to seven nights of primetime programming in 1993, Fox announced its fall schedule on May 25 of that year, including Front Page, which debuted a mere month later, on June 26. The original format, besides the three traditional newsmagazine long-form pieces, included short commentaries and video essays. Walter Goodman, a New York Times TV columnist, called it at the time "a news magazine for people who grew up on television." Other commentators for the program included Mike Lupica, syndicated columnist Joe Bob Briggs, Lisa Birnbach, Chris Matthews, and Tad Low. It was cancelled due to low ratings.

The program's graphic designers, including Max Almy and Teri Yarbrow, won the 1993 News & Documentary Emmy Award in Graphic Design.
