= FBI: The Untold Stories =

- Genre: Police drama
- Directed by: Corey Allen; Burt Brinkerhoff; Judy Chaikin; Arthur Allan Seidelman
- Presented by: Pernell Roberts
- Country of origin: United States
- Original language: English
- No. of seasons: 2
- No. of episodes: 13

Production
- Running time: 30 minutes
- Production company: The Arthur Company

Original release
- Network: ABC
- Release: 26 September 1991 – 1 June 1993

FBI: The Untold Stories is a police drama anthology series which was aired in the United States on ABC from 1991 to 1993.

== Overview ==
Unlike ABC's The F.B.I., which was one of the network's major successes of the late 1960s and early 1970s, F.B.I.:The Untold Stories had no ongoing characters or storylines; each week's show was dramatized by different actors. Also unlike the earlier program, actual news and surveillance footage was incorporated into the program to add authenticity. One similarity with the predecessor program was that this one was also based on actual cases handled by the Federal Bureau of Investigation of the United States Department of Justice, and was made with the Bureau's full cooperation and involvement. Providing continuity from week to week was the ongoing narration of actor Pernell Roberts.

== Cases ==
- The Hijacking of TWA Flight 541
- Claude Dallas
- The Murder of Judge John Wood
- Suzie Jaeger Kidnapping
- Harvey's Resort Hotel bombing
- Alan Berg Case
- Buried Alive
- The Kidnapping of Tina Risico
- Tony Kiritsis
- Cooper/McCoy Hijacking
- Conner and Dougherty
- 1986 FBI Miami Shootout
