= Jack's Place (TV series) =

American drama television series (1992–93)

- Genre: Drama
- Created by: Amy Holden Jones
- Starring: Hal Linden; Finola Hughes; John Dye
- Composers: David Schwartz; Bill Elliott
- Country of origin: United States
- Original language: English
- No. of seasons: 2
- No. of episodes: 19 (1 unaired)

Production
- Executive producer: David Tyron King
- Camera setup: Single-camera
- Running time: 48 minutes
- Production company: ABC Productions

Original release
- Network: ABC
- Release: May 26, 1992 – July 13, 1993

Jack's Place is an American drama television series created by Amy Holden Jones that aired from May 26, 1992, to July 13, 1993, on ABC. The series was about a retired jazz musician named Jack Evans (Hal Linden) who runs a restaurant where romances tend to start. The waitress, Chelsea, was played by Finola Hughes and the bartender Greg was played by John Dye.

== History ==
A first attempt at the series, in 1991, starred Lou Rawls in a never-aired pilot. "ABC liked the idea but not the execution, I guess," his successor, Hal Linden, said the following year, "So they hired a new producer, Scott Brazil, who rewrote it, recast it and got me on board." Linden speculated that his casting came from the character being "a former musician and bandleader performer, and so am I. Maybe they were going on that."

== Cast ==
- Hal Linden as Jack Evans
- Finola Hughes as Chelsea
- John Dye as Greg

== Episodes ==
=== Season 1 (1992) ===
No. overall	No. in season	Title	Directed by	Written by	Original release date
1	1	"I See Cupid, I See France"	Kristoffer Tabori	Daphne Pollon & David Castro	May 26, 1992
6	6	"What's New?"	Miles Watkins	Unknown	June 9, 1992
4	4	"Solo"	Unknown	Unknown	June 16, 1992
3	3	"Everything Old Is New Again"	Charles Siebert	Robert Rabinowitz	June 23, 1992
5	5	"Forever"	Unknown	Unknown	June 30, 1992
2	2	"Romance Takes a Curtain"	Joan Darling	Michael Pavone & Dave Alan Johnson	July 7, 1992

=== Season 2 (1993) ===
No. overall	No. in season	Title	Directed by	Written by	Original release date
7	1	"An Affair to Vaguely Remember"	Unknown	Unknown	January 12, 1993
9	3	"Watch Me Pull a Dream Out of My Hat"	Miles Watkins	Michael Pavone & Dave Alan Johnson	January 14, 1993
11	5	"The Seventh Meal"	Paul Lazarus	Nicholas Sagan & Linda Salzman	January 21, 1993
10	4	"Who Knew?"	Charles Siebert	Unknown	January 28, 1993
12	6	"Forever and Ever"	Kristoffer Tabori	Unknown	February 4, 1993
14	8	"Gypsies, Champs and Thieves"	Max Tash	Unknown	February 11, 1993
15	9	"Play It Again, Jack"	Helaine Head	Martha Williamson	June 8, 1993
17	11	"The Pipes Are Calling"	James Keach	Martha Williamson	June 15, 1993
13	7	"The Hands of Time"	Unknown	Martha Williamson	June 22, 1993
16	10	"Something Wonderful This Way Comes"	Kristoffer Tabori	Dave Alan Johnson and Michael Pavone	June 29, 1993
8	2	"Faithful Henry"	Unknown	Unknown	July 6, 1993
19	13	"True Love Ways"	Larry Rapaport	Scott Shepard	July 13, 1993
18	12	"Game Over"	TBD	TBD	UNAIRED

== Reception ==
The show was slated to simply be shown in the summer, but did well enough in the ratings that ABC decided to pick up the series for more episodes. Although initially having some success with audiences reviews tended toward the negative. Hence, Entertainment Weekly deemed it "drearily sentimental and banal", while Jon Burlingame was slightly more positive, describing it as happy and unthreatening. Both reviewers compared it to The Love Boat and Cheers.
