= I Witness Video =

- Genre: Docudrama
- Presented by: Patrick Van Horn (1992–93); John Forsythe (1993–94)
- Country of origin: United States
- Original language: English

Production
- Running time: 60 minutes

Original release
- Network: NBC
- Release: February 23, 1992 – July 10, 1994

I Witness Video is an NBC News production primetime series and American informational reality television-based television program that aired on NBC on Sunday night from August 16, 1992 to July 10, 1994. It was first seen as a series of six specials beginning on February 23, 1992, and created the genre of dramatic video footage pre-empting traditional journalism now featured on ABC World News Tonight.

== Overview ==
Each episode featured videos sent in by viewers. The videos shown featured robberies, hostage situations, fires, and natural disasters, including tidal waves, and earthquakes and had interviews with the people involved. The program received some criticism for airing violent content in what is considered the "family hour".
