= Top Cops =

- Country of origin: United States
- Original language: English

Production
- Executive producers: Sonny Grosso, Larry Jacobson
- Production companies: Grosso-Jacobson Productions; CBS Entertainment Productions

Original release
- Network: CBS
- Release: July 18, 1990 – December 8, 1993

Top Cops is a documentary program broadcast in the United States on the CBS television network from July 18, 1990, to December 8, 1993.

Each episode of Top Cops consisted of two to three segments featuring commended police officers and dramatic recreations of the events leading to their having been honored.
