= The Human Factor (TV series) =

- Genre: Medical drama
- Created by: John Mankiewicz
- Starring: John Mahoney; Eriq La Salle; Melinda McGraw; Kurt Deutsch
- Composer: Mike Post
- Country of origin: United States
- Original language: English
- No. of seasons: 1
- No. of episodes: 8 (3 unaired)

Production
- Executive producer: Dick Wolf
- Running time: 60 minutes
- Production companies: Wolf Films; Universal Television

Original release
- Network: CBS
- Release: April 16 – May 28, 1992

The Human Factor is an American medical drama television series that aired on CBS from April 16 to May 28, 1992 and starred Eriq La Salle and John Mahoney. The executive producer was Dick Wolf.

== Cast ==
- John Mahoney as Dr. Alec McMurtry
- Jan Lucas as Joan McMurtry
- Eriq La Salle as Michael Stoven
- Melinda McGraw as Rebecca Travis
- Kurt Deutsch as Matt Robbins
- Matthew Ryan as Joe Murphy

== Episodes ==
No.	Title	Directed by	Written by	Original release date	Prod. code
1	"Pilot"	Don Scardino	John Mankiewicz	April 16, 1992	83564
2	"Second Opinions"	Unknown	John Mankiewicz & William Sackheim	April 23, 1992	67704
3	"Between the Sheets"	Unknown	Cathryn Michon	April 30, 1992	67702
4	"A Gift from Frankie Paluzzo"	Unknown	Karen Harris	May 21, 1992	67706
5	"Do the Right Thing"	Vern Gillum	Jerry Patrick Brown	May 28, 1992	67708
6	"Hear No Evil"	N/A	N/A	Unaired	67701
7	"A Wrongful Life"	N/A	N/A	Unaired	67705
8	"Doctor Al"	N/A	David J. Burke	Unaired	67711
