= Julie (TV series) =

1992 American television sitcom

- Genre: Sitcom
- Created by: Ruthie Shatz; Irving Shatz
- Developed by: Madeline Sunshine; Steve Sunshine
- Directed by: Blake Edwards
- Starring: Julie Andrews; James Farentino; Eugene Roche; Hayley Tyrie; Rider Strong
- Theme music composer: Henry Mancini
- Composer: Nan Schwartz
- Country of origin: United States
- Original language: English
- No. of seasons: 1
- No. of episodes: 7 (2 unaired)

Production
- Executive producers: Tony Adams; Jeffrey Auerbach; Blake Edwards; Madeline Sunshine; Steve Sunshine
- Running time: 30 minutes
- Production companies: Blake Edwards Television; Viacom Productions

Original release
- Network: ABC
- Release: May 30 – July 4, 1992

Julie is an American sitcom starring Julie Andrews which aired on ABC from May 30 to July 4, 1992. Blake Edwards, Andrews' husband, was the director and executive producer of the series.

== Synopsis ==
Andrews starred as Julie Carlisle, a television personality who marries a veterinarian, Sam McGuire (James Farentino). Julie, along with her new husband and stepchildren, relocates to Sioux City, Iowa. The series chronicled her new life in coping with a career and family; it was largely panned by critics and was subsequently canceled after six episodes had aired (seven had been produced) due to low ratings.

The series was broadcast in the UK on Channel 4 during Christmas 1993, but has yet to be repeated either in the UK or the US.

== Cast ==
- Julie Andrews as Julie Carlisle McGuire
- James Farentino as Sam McGuire, Julie's husband
- Eugene Roche as Wooley Woolstein
- Hayley Tyrie as Alexandra "Alex" McGuire, Sam's daughter
- Rider Strong as Adam McGuire, Sam's son
- Alicia Brandt as Joy Foy
- Laurel Cronin as Bernice "Bernie" Farrell
- Kevin Scannell as Dickie Duncan

== Episodes ==
No.	Title	Directed by	Written by	Original release date
0	"Touch and Go"	Blake Edwards	Ruthie & Irving Shatz	UNAIRED
1	"Pilot"	Blake Edwards	Madeline & Steven Sunshine	May 30, 1992
2	"Allie's Talent"	Blake Edwards	Joe & Nancy Guppy and Lyla Oliver	June 6, 1992
3	"The Ugly Bed"	Blake Edwards	Harry Cauley & Jenna McMahon	June 20, 1992
4	"The Monkey"	Blake Edwards	Madeline & Steven Sunshine	June 27, 1992
5	"Nick Wyler Visits"	Blake Edwards	Joe & Nancy Guppy	July 4, 1992
6	"Put Up Your Dukes"	Blake Edwards	Harry Cauley & Jenna McMahon	UNAIRED
