= Totally Hidden Video =

- Genre: Reality / Game show
- Presented by: Steve Skrovan (1989–1991); Mark Pitta (1991–1992)
- Country of origin: United States
- Original language: English

Production
- Running time: 30 minutes
- Production company: Quantum Media

Original release
- Network: Fox
- Release: July 9, 1989 – August 14, 1992

Totally Hidden Video is an American hidden-camera television show and game show that aired from 1989 to 1992. It was one of the early shows in the history of the Fox television network and held the highest viewing share for any Fox program at one point. It was produced by Quantum Media and Fox.

The show premiered on Sunday, July 9, 1989. Steve Skrovan was the program's first host, later replaced by Mark Pitta in 1991.

Shortly after its debut, a game segment called Totally Homemade Videos was added to the show. In this segment, contestants sent in their funny videos to win a $10,000 prize, the winners of which were announced by Skrovan at the end of every episode - very similar to the format used by rival series America's Funniest Home Videos.

== Controversy ==
The show was accused of using paid actors in a lawsuit filed against the Fox Broadcasting Co. by Candid Camera's creator Allen Funt, who also accused the show of stealing his ideas. While the producers admitted that the series pilot had staged some of the "setups", they swore all skits which made it to air were legitimate. However, in the wake of the controversy, series producer Larry Hovis was fired for staging incidents.

== In popular culture ==
On an episode of Saved By the Bell, Zack Morris references the show by claiming someone is on it in an effort to save face.

In the season 5 "Triple Play" episode of The Golden Girls, when Blanche calls off a scheme to meet wealthy men by claiming to be selling an expensive car, Sophia tries to help Blanche save face by telling the men that the whole thing was a setup for Totally Hidden Video, and that she's actually Kaye Ballard in disguise.

== See also ==
- Candid Camera
