= The Powers That Be (TV series) =

American television sitcom

- Genre: Sitcom
- Created by: David Crane; Marta Kauffman
- Directed by: Hal Cooper; Art Wolff
- Starring: John Forsythe; Holland Taylor; Eve Gordon; Peter MacNicol; Valerie Mahaffey; David Hyde Pierce; Elizabeth Berridge; Joseph Gordon-Levitt; Robin Bartlett
- Opening theme: "The Powers That Be" performed by Stephen Bishop
- Composer: Marvin Hamlisch
- Country of origin: United States
- Original language: English
- No. of seasons: 2
- No. of episodes: 21

Production
- Executive producer: Norman Lear
- Producers: Ron Burla; Patricia Fass Palmer
- Cinematography: Dan Kuleto
- Camera setup: Multi-camera
- Production companies: Act III Television; ELP Communications; Castle Rock Entertainment; Columbia Pictures Television

Original release
- Network: NBC
- Release: March 7, 1992 – January 2, 1993
- Network: USA Network
- Release: January 18 – January 22, 1993

The Powers That Be is an American television sitcom that was broadcast on NBC, premiering on March 7, 1992. It was created by David Crane and Marta Kauffman, with Norman Lear as executive producer. It aired for two seasons, with 21 episodes filmed, with 16 of them airing on the network, with its final episode being broadcast on January 2, 1993. During the week of January 18–22, 1993, USA Network aired the remaining 5 episodes that never aired on NBC.

== Premise ==
At the center of the series is U.S. Senator William Powers, a parody of the political establishment in Washington, D.C. Margaret, the senator's status-hungry wife, treats Charlotte, their maid, with comedic disdain. Caitlyn, the senator's daughter, has an eating disorder and is married to Representative Theodore Van Horne, who is suicidal; their son Pierce is mature beyond his years from having to care for his unbalanced parents. Sophie Lipkin, the senator's illegitimate daughter, is a loud, crass New Jerseyan who surprises the family when she moves to Washington and begins to bond with her father. The senator's staff includes an intelligent and beautiful aide, Jordan Miller — who is also Powers' mistress — and feckless aide Bradley Grist.

== Cast ==
- John Forsythe as William Powers
- Holland Taylor as Margaret Powers
- Eve Gordon as Jordan Miller
- Peter MacNicol as Bradley Grist
- Valerie Mahaffey as Caitlyn Van Horne
- David Hyde Pierce as Theodore Van Horne
- Elizabeth Berridge as Charlotte
- Joseph Gordon-Levitt as Pierce Van Horne
- Robin Bartlett as Sophie Lipkin

== Episodes ==
=== Series overview ===
Season	Episodes	Originally released	
Season	Episodes	First released	Last released
1	8	March 7, 1992	April 18, 1992
2	13	November 7, 1992	January 2, 1993

=== Season 1 (1992) ===
No. overall	No. in season	Title	Directed by	Written by	Original release date	Viewers (millions)
1	1	"The Love Child"	Norman Lear	T : Charlotte Brown; S/T : David Crane & Marta Kauffman S : Charlotte Brown; T : David Crane & Marta Kauffman	March 7, 1992	18.5
2	2	"The Love Child"	Hal Cooper	T : Charlotte Brown; S/T : David Crane & Marta Kauffman S : Charlotte Brown; T : David Crane & Marta Kauffman	March 7, 1992	18.5
In the middle of a tough re-election campaign with a local hero, Senator Powers finds that he has an additional potential obstacle to his re-election: an illegitimate daughter. Being accepted in Washington takes a back seat when Sophie goes head-to-head with the rest of the family.
3	3	"Bill Gets Shot"	Art Wolff	Graham Yost	March 14, 1992	15.3
It's Caitlyn and Theodore's anniversary and Margaret is insistent that Sophie not join the family for dinner. Meanwhile, the campaigning Senator is in need of some publicity, but he didn't expect it to come from Theodore's botched suicide attempt—which results in Bill being shot in a very undignified location.
4	4	"My Mother, My Self"	Art Wolff	Ron Burla	March 21, 1992	16.9
Not being asked to a White House luncheon for Princess Diana is bad enough, but Margaret really gets upset when her efforts only result in Caitlyn being invited instead. Margaret then tries to play on Caitlyn's insecurities to secure the invitation for herself, including playing her trump card: Sophie. Meanwhile, Bill just wants the family to get along.
5	5	"Dirty Politics"	Art Wolff	Bob Sand	March 28, 1992	14.2
Margaret, Jordan, and Bradley scheme to discredit the Senator's opponent, the now-handicapped former-pro footballer Joe Bowman (Craig Bierko). The result is a faked videotape of Bowman hopping out of his chair. The press discovers that the tape is a fake. Bill visits Bowman in a last-ditch effort to save his aides from being fired, and Bill is startled by what he finds.
6	6	"Kiss Me Caitlyn"	Art Wolff	Graham Yost	April 4, 1992	13.8
The Senator and his aides have no choice but to offer Joe Bowman a public apology—in spite of his paralysis secretly being a sham. Meanwhile, Bowman sets his sights on seducing Caitlyn to have someone inside the Senator's camp. Caitlyn finds herself simultaneously charmed and repulsed by Mr. Bowman while she contemplates having an affair with him. Meanwhile, Bill and Margaret share a spontaneous night of passion.
7	7	"Bill and Margaret's Excellent Adventure"	Art Wolff	Anne Convy	April 11, 1992	13.2
After Bill and Margaret's unexpected night of passion, Bill considers ending his relationship with Jordan in favor of the chance at rekindling the fire in his marriage—leaving Jordan fuming and shocked. Meanwhile, Caitlyn can't get Joe Bowman out of her head, and Bradley gets high from painkillers that he is taking for a kidney stone.
8	8	"Charlerella"	Art Wolff	Ron Burla	April 18, 1992	15.4
The Powers household is invited to attend a ball in the Senator's honor, but Margaret conveniently forgets to invite Charlotte until it's too late. Theodore stays behind to wait for Caitlyn, but winds up spending a romantic evening with Charlotte when they get snowed in. Meanwhile, Caitlyn slinks off to Joe Bowman's hotel room, and the blizzard keeps the rest of the Powers clan trapped in their limo.

=== Season 2 (1992–93) ===
No. overall	No. in season	Title	Directed by	Written by	Original release date	Viewers (millions)
9	1	"A Chicken in Every Pot"	Hal Cooper	Mady Julian	November 7, 1992	12.7
To curry favor, Margaret donates her chicken salad to the favorite charity of the new First Lady, who falls ill after eating it. Meanwhile, Theodore and Charlotte try to fight their attraction to each other.
10	2	"Bill's Dead...Not"	Hal Cooper	Nancylee Myatt	November 7, 1992	12.7
The Senator takes a road trip to visit his elderly mother, Enid Powers (Cloris Leachman) and picks up a hitchhiker—who turns out to be a carjacker. As Bill then tries to make his way to his mother's home, the carjacker crashes the car into a gas tanker, leaving the family and the press to believe that the Senator has been killed. As the Powers camp mourns Bill, Margaret contemplates accepting her husband's Senate seat.
11	3	"I'm Your Dummy"	Hal Cooper	Julie Thacker	November 14, 1992	10.9
Theodore volunteers to be the Senator's dummy in a ventriloquist act that everyone else finds embarrassingly bad.
12	4	"How Sharper Than a Servant's Tooth"	Hal Cooper	Ron Burla	November 21, 1992	11.6
A crisis back in the Senator's home state is nothing compared to the crisis in the Senator's household: Charlotte wants to quit because of her secret feelings for Theodore. Meanwhile, Jordan is frustrated that Margaret's problems are more important to Bill than celebrating the anniversary of their relationship together.
13	5	"The Intern"	Hal Cooper	Ron Burla	November 28, 1992	11.6
Jordan and Margaret both suspect that the Senator's new female intern (Tiffani-Amber Thiessen) has designs on him.
14	6	"Sophie's Big Decision"	Hal Cooper	Graham Yost	December 5, 1992	9.9
Just as Sophie asks Margaret for some tips on fitting into the Washington scene, Larry (Robert Picardo), the boyfriend who always kept her down, shows up to take her back to New Jersey. Meanwhile, Margaret is desperate to get a Supreme Court Justice to show up at her party, and Bradley and Jordan try to show each other up by getting the most influential guests at the event.
15	7	"Oh, Mack"	Hal Cooper	Rod Parker	December 12, 1992	9.6
A visiting Hollywood mogul (Victor Garber) charms everyone in the Senator's household—except the Senator, who suspects that something is amiss. Meanwhile, each of the ladies thinks that she's the object of their guest's desires.
16	8	"St. Caitlyn of Shears"	Hal Cooper	Nancylee Myatt	January 2, 1993	8.9
A bad haircut causes Caitlyn to come to a personal crisis and decide she is too caught up in materialism. Meanwhile, Bradley is desperate to get the Senator media attention after his name is not included on the list of the most influential Democrats in the new administration.
17	9	"Having a Ball"	Hal Cooper	Graham Yost	January 18, 1993 (USA Network)	N/A
The Powers are ecstatic when they are invited to be in the Presidential motorcade for Clinton's inauguration, but when Jordan is excluded, she tries to make Bill jealous by making plans with an old boyfriend. As the delayed Powers and a bicycling Bradley brave the icy roads in hopes of catching up with the President, Theodore worries that Charlotte thinks he forgot her birthday.
18	10	"Bradley Gets Fired"	Hal Cooper	Rod Burton	January 19, 1993 (USA Network)	N/A
When a malingering Bradley is fired, Margaret takes over as press liaison.
19	11	"Grammargate: Part 1"	Hal Cooper	Rod Burton	January 20, 1993 (USA Network)	N/A
While drunk, Bradley makes the mistake of his life, as does Pierce when he hacks into the school's computer. Meanwhile, Theodore has his own troubles.
20	12	"Grammargate: Part 2"	Hal Cooper	Rod Burton	January 21, 1993 (USA Network)	N/A
While trying to rectify the situation for Pierce, Margaret and Caitlyn find they have their own problem. Consummation is the answer to Bradley's problems, and Theodore conquers his fear.
21	13	"Grandma's Big Decision"	Hal Cooper	Graham Yost	January 22, 1993 (USA Network)	N/A
Bill's mother (Cloris Leachman), shows up just before her 93rd birthday and announces that she's moving in until she dies. Then she asks her already-frustrated daughter-in-law to kill her off! Meanwhile, Sophie surprises Jordan when she moves into her apartment building, leaving Jordan concerned that the Senator's nosy daughter will discover their affair.

== See also ==
- All's Fair
