= Arresting Behavior =

- Genre: Comedy
- Created by: Larry Levin
- Written by: Larry Levin
- Starring: Leo Burmester; Chris Mulkey; Ron Eldard; Lee Garlington; Eric Balfour
- Composer: Donald Markowitz
- Country of origin: United States
- Original language: English
- No. of seasons: 1
- No. of episodes: 7

Production
- Executive producers: Vic Kaplan; Larry Levin
- Camera setup: Single-camera
- Running time: 30 minutes
- Production companies: Rock Island Productions; Vic Kaplan Productions; HBO Independent Productions

Original release
- Network: ABC
- Release: August 18 – September 2, 1992

Arresting Behavior is an American sitcom that aired on ABC from August 18 to September 2, 1992.

== Synopsis ==
The series centered on partners Bill Ruskin and Donny Walsh who were followed by hand-held cameras as they worked in Vista Valley, California. It parodied the then-new genre of police reality shows such as Cops.

== Cast ==
- Leo Burmester as Officer Bill Ruskin
- Chris Mulkey as Officer Pete Walsh
- Ron Eldard as Officer Donny Walsh
- Joey Simmrin as Seth Ruskin
- Amy Hathaway as Rhonda Ruskin
- Lee Garlington as Connie Ruskin
- Eric Balfour as Bill Ruskin Jr.

== Episodes ==
No.	Title	Original release date
1	"Pilot"	August 18, 1992
2	"Homemakers and Hookers"	August 19, 1992
3	"Oaxitajaca"	August 26, 1992
4	"Labor Day"	September 2, 1992
5	"Family Values"	Unaired
