= Hot Country Nights =

- Genre: Variety show
- Created by: Dick Clark and Gene Weed
- Written by: Barry Adelman
- Directed by: Gene Weed
- Narrated by: Ken Cooper
- Country of origin: United States
- Original language: English
- No. of seasons: 1
- No. of episodes: 12

Production
- Executive producer: Dick Clark
- Producers: Gene Weed, Barry Adelman
- Running time: approx. 44-48 minutes
- Production company: Dick Clark Productions

Original release
- Network: NBC
- Release: November 24, 1991 – March 1, 1992

Hot Country Nights is an American television variety show featuring country music and stand-up comedy. It aired on NBC from November 1991 to March 1992.

== History and content ==
Dick Clark and Gene Weed came up with the show's concept after noticing the contemporary success of country music in the mainstream at the beginning of the 1990s. Weed also served as the show's producer and director.

Each episode of Hot Country Nights featured performances by country music singers, with an attempt to focus equally on up-and-coming, existing, and veteran acts. The debut episode on November 24, 1991 featured performances by K. T. Oslin, Alabama, Clint Black, Doug Stone, and Pam Tillis. Debuting in November 1991, the show faltered in the ratings against Murder, She Wrote, America's Funniest Home Videos, and In Living Color. Its twelfth and final episode aired on March 1, 1992. Its slot was replaced in April by the science fiction drama Mann & Machine.
