= Stand by Your Man (TV series) =

- Based on: Birds of a Feather
- Developed by: Nancy Steen; Neil Thompson
- Starring: Melissa Gilbert Brinkman; Rosie O'Donnell; Sam McMurray; Rick Hall; Miriam Flynn; Rusty Schwimmer; Don Gibb; Ellen Ratners
- Composer: Chuck Loeb
- Country of origin: United States
- Original language: English
- No. of seasons: 1
- No. of episodes: 7

Production
- Running time: 30 minutes
- Production companies: Home Made Productions; WitzEnd Productions; 20th Century Fox Television

Original release
- Network: Fox
- Release: April 5 – May 17, 1992

Stand By Your Man is an American sitcom that aired on Fox from April 5, 1992, to May 17, 1992. The series was developed by Nancy Steen and Neil Thompson, who also wrote some of the episodes. It is notable for being Melissa Gilbert's return to series television after the conclusion of Little House on the Prairie nine years earlier, and the first lead sitcom role for Rosie O'Donnell, who was then on the verge of breaking into major fame.

The series was created as an American adaptation of the British sitcom Birds of a Feather, which was still in production at the time.

== Synopsis ==
The show's premise, as narrated in the opening credits by Fox network's chief announcer Joe Cipriano in a deadpan comical fashion, was that two sisters, earthy Rochelle Dunphy and loud, crass Lorraine Popowski agreed to live together for emotional and moral support while their husbands were doing time in prison for robbery. Rochelle was a trophy wife who had married Roger Dunphy, a former working stiff who had become wealthy, supposedly as a successful manufacturer of sunroom and patio furniture. As the narrator said about Rochelle "One sister married a business owner and lived in the lap of luxury", while the camera focuses on Roger's palatial home in Franklin Heights, New Jersey. She thought her life of luxury was near perfect until her husband was discovered to have committed a series of major bank robberies. (Roger had in fact owed much of his wealth, and the money he spoiled Rochelle with, to robbing banks.) Lorraine had married blue-collar slob Artie Popowski in a shot-gun ceremony in Las Vegas. Cipriano introduced Lorraine by saying "the other sister married a no-good bum, and well, you get the picture", as the camera focuses on a doublewide. Rochelle and Lorraine are watching TV one day when a breaking news story shows two men captured red-handed in a midtown bank heist, then react with shock as they are unmasked to be Artie and Roger. Both men were sentenced to eight years in the state penintentiary, which was close to Franklin Heights, so both husbands were frequently featured in contact with their wives at the visitor center. Roger revealed his patio business flourished for a time, but was in danger of bankruptcy and he resorted to crime to keep up the charade of wealth, whilst Artie had gambled away his meager assets at the dog track and resorted to crime to provide for Lorraine (albeit scantily).

Since most of Roger's wealth was re-claimed by their respective banks upon his and Artie's sentencing, Rochelle and Lorraine were suddenly faced with financial problems. Artie's trailer was repossessed, so Lorraine had no choice but to move into Rochelle in Roger's home, which was proven to have been acquired legally. The former was reluctant to find a job, after living off Roger for so long; the latter worked at Bargain Circus, a retail store, helping the two get by. Gloria and Sophie were Lorraine's co-workers at the store. Ironically, one time when Lorraine demanded the timid Rochelle get a job, it turned out to backfire on her. Earlier, the manager got fired for groping Lorraine, and learned the new manager was someone who impressed corporate headquarters with her self-confidence: Rochelle.

Adrienne Stone was the status-conscious next-door neighbor who resented everything having to do with the sisters' living arrangement. Adrienne was convinced that Lorraine was helping to bring down the value of the neighborhood, never missed an opportunity to make the imprisoned husbands a subject of conversation, and in addition, had something hypocritical to hide. Lorraine's biker friend Scab, a rough but good-hearted guy, caught the eye of Adrienne, and she started an affair with him. She easily convinced Scab to become a kept man and getting her friends to think he was some kind of pro athlete or sea captain, and his fancy new attire such as a tuxedo impresses Lorraine. Their relationship was openly revealed to everyone before the end of the series' short run.

In every episode, Rochelle and Lorraine also visited their husbands in prison. Much of the key conflict between the sisters occurred here; Rochelle could not be apart from Roger for too long, since they were still madly in love; Lorraine, who still stood by Artie, vented her anger towards Roger, but also expressed anger at Artie for being an accomplice and in her own sardonic way, hoped his imprisonment could help him reform.

== Cast ==
- Melissa Gilbert as Rochelle Dunphy
- Rosie O'Donnell as Lorraine Popowski
- Sam McMurray as Roger Dunphy
- Rick Hall as Artie Popowski
- Rusty Schwimmer as Gloria
- Ellen Ratners as Sophie
- Miriam Flynn as Adrienne Stone

== Episodes ==
No.	Title	Directed by	Written by	Original release date
1	"For Better or Worse"	Unknown	Nancy Steen & Neil Thompson	April 5, 1992
2	"Visiting Day"	Unknown	Nancy Steen & Neil Thompson	April 12, 1992
3	"Labor Pains"	John Sgueglia	Stephen Nathan	April 19, 1992
4	"Spare Me"	John Sgueglia	David Chambers	April 26, 1992
5	"The Prowler"	Pat Fischer-Doak and John Sgueglia	Tom Reeder	May 3, 1992
6	"The Blooming"	John Sgueglia	Liz Sage	May 10, 1992
7	"Getting Out"	John Sgueglia	Dave Caplan & Brian LaPan	May 17, 1992

== Scheduling ==
Stand by Your Man was Fox's attempt to finally add power to the latter half of their Sunday night lineup, building upon the success of the shows that aired earlier that night. At this time, Fox still scheduled Sunday programming up until 11/10c, and hoped that the broad, somewhat raunchy nature of Stand by Your Man would draw a sizeable audience for the 10/9c slot. The network also saw the series as its "next big Married...With Children" (many critics claimed Stand by Your Man outdid Married... with the style of its writing).

For the show's original episode run, and for two weeks beyond, it aired at 10/9c on Sundays. Fox officially canceled the series in May. The show then moved into the 10:30/9:30c slot on the same evening, in mid-June: after two more months of summer reruns, Stand by Your Man had its last network airing on August 9, 1992.

== Theme song ==
The show's title was taken from the Tammy Wynette song of the same name; though neither the song itself nor a variation of it was used in the series.

== Reception ==
The show was critically panned by television critics.
