= Room for Two (American TV series) =

- Created by: Rick Kellard; Wendy Goldman
- Directed by: Will Mackenzie; Peter Bonerz; Peter Baldwin
- Starring: Linda Lavin; Patricia Heaton; Bess Meyer; Andrew Prine; Paula Kelly; Peter Michael Goetz; John Putch; Jeff Yagher
- Country of origin: United States
- Original language: English
- No. of seasons: 2
- No. of episodes: 26 (2 unaired)

Production
- Executive producer: Wendy Goldman
- Running time: 30 minutes
- Production companies: Big Deal, Inc. Phantom Productions; Warner Bros. Television

Original release
- Network: ABC
- Release: March 24, 1992 – July 6, 1993

Room for Two is an American sitcom television series starring Patricia Heaton and Linda Lavin that aired for two seasons on ABC from March 24, 1992 to July 6, 1993. The series marked Linda Lavin's return to a series after her prior CBS sitcom, Alice, ended in 1985.

== Overview ==
Patricia Heaton stars as Jill Kurland, an executive producer of a New York City television show called Wake Up, New York. The show focused on Jill's relationship with her mother Edie (Linda Lavin) from Ohio, who joined Jill's show as a result of her humorous and misplaced opinions and criticisms.

== Cast ==
- Linda Lavin as Edie Kurland
- Patricia Heaton as Jill Kurland
- Bess Meyer as Naomi Dylan
- Andrew Prine as Reid Ellis
- Paula Kelly as Diahnn Boudreaud
- Peter Michael Goetz as Ken Kazurinsky
- John Putch as Matt Draughon
- Jeff Yagher as Keith Wyman

== Episodes ==
=== Series overview ===
Season	Episodes	Originally released	
Season	Episodes	First released	Last released
1	7	March 24, 1992	April 29, 1992
2	19	September 3, 1992	July 6, 1993

=== Season 1 (1992) ===
No. overall	No. in season	Title	Directed by	Written by	Original release date	Viewers (millions)
1	1	"Pilot"	Will Mackenzie	Rick Kellard & Wendy Goldman	March 24, 1992	27.1
2	2	"Not Quite... Room for Two"	Will Mackenzie	Rick Kellard & Wendy Goldman	March 31, 1992	26.4
3	3	"Whose Mouth Is It Anyway?"	Will Mackenzie	Russ Woody	April 7, 1992	19.7
4	4	"Help"	Will Mackenzie	Rick Kellard & Wendy Goldman	April 14, 1992	21.3
5	5	"Private Parts"	Peter Bonerz	Dana Coen	April 15, 1992	13.1
6	6	"Psyched!"	Peter Bonerz	Lisa Loomer	April 22, 1992	12.8
7	7	"Winners and Other Losers"	Peter Bonerz	Russ Woody	April 29, 1992	11.7

=== Season 2 (1992–93) ===
No. overall	No. in season	Title	Directed by	Written by	Original release date	Viewers (millions)
8	1	"A Couch with a View"	Peter Bonerz	Lisa Loomer	September 3, 1992	7.3
9	2	"Little White Lies"	Peter Bonerz	Russ Woody	September 10, 1992	7.6
10	3	"A Couple of Couples"	Peter Bonerz	Wendy Goldman & Rick Kellard	September 17, 1992	11.7
11	4	"My Right Foot"	Will Mackenzie	Wendy Goldman & Rick Kellard	September 24, 1992	11.4
12	5	"If It's Saturday, It Must Be Meat Loaf"	Will Mackenzie	Tom Maxwell & Don Woodard	October 1, 1992	10.2
13	6	"A Night with the Jetsons"	Will Mackenzie	Wendy Goldman & Rick Kellard	October 8, 1992	13.7
14	7	"Ken, We Hardly Knew Ye... Much"	Will Mackenzie	Russ Woody	October 15, 1992	11.6
15	8	"And Now, a Pause for Menopause"	Will Mackenzie	Wendy Goldman & Rick Kellard	October 29, 1992	10.5
16	9	"The Night of the Living Lou"	Will Mackenzie	Becky Hartman Edwards	November 12, 1992	9.1
17	10	"Dog Day Afternoons"	Peter Bonerz	Emily Levine	November 26, 1992	7.4
18	11	"All Men Are Created Equal, Bummer"	Will Mackenzie	Tom Maxwell & Don Woodard	December 3, 1992	9.1
19	12	"All Edie's Children"	Will Mackenzie	Kathy Slevin	December 17, 1992	8.8
20	13	"Sex, Rugs and Rock 'n' Roll"	Will Mackenzie	Russ Woody	June 8, 1993	14.2
21	14	"To Book or Not to Book"	Will Mackenzie	Russ Woody	June 15, 1993	14.1
22	15	"Moving On"	Will Mackenzie	Kathy Slevin	June 22, 1993	13.9
23	16	"Big Noise from Mendota"	Will Mackenzie	Tom Maxwell & Don Woodard	June 29, 1993	15.0
24	17	"M Is for the Many Things"	Will Mackenzie	Wendy Goldman & Rick Kellard	July 6, 1993	14.9
25	18	"Look Ma, Four Hands"	N/A	N/A	Unaired	N/A
26	19	"A Home, a Loan"	N/A	N/A	Unaired	N/A

== See also ==
Great News, a later two season sitcom, featuring a very similar premise of a daughter working as a television producer, whose mother ends up working on the same show, and interfering with both her work and love life.

== DVD releases ==
There are currently no DVD releases planned by Warner Bros., who owns the rights. However, the second episode was included in a commemorative DVD released by Warner Bros. during their 50th anniversary, along with the pilot of My Sister Sam.
