= Good & Evil (TV series) =

American sitcom

- Genre: Situation comedy
- Created by: Susan Harris
- Directed by: Terry Hughes
- Starring: Teri Garr; Margaret Whitton; Marian Seldes; Lane Davies; Mark Blankfield; Lane Smith; Mary Gillis; Seth Green; Brooke Theiss; Marius Weyers; Sherman Howard; William Shockley
- Composer: George Aliceson Tipton
- Country of origin: United States
- Original language: English
- No. of seasons: 1
- No. of episodes: 11 (5 unaired)

Production
- Executive producers: Tom Straw; Bob Underwood; Paul Junger Witt; Tony Thomas; Susan Harris
- Producer: Gilbert Junger
- Running time: 30 minutes
- Production companies: Witt–Thomas–Harris Productions; Touchstone Television

Original release
- Network: ABC
- Release: September 25 – October 30, 1991

Good & Evil is an American sitcom and soap opera parody that was broadcast in the United States on ABC from September 25 to October 30, 1991. The series was created by Susan Harris, and produced by Witt/Thomas/Harris Productions in association with Touchstone Television.

== Production ==
Prior to ABC's cancellation of the show, 11 full episodes of Good & Evil had been produced.

== Cast and characters ==
- Teri Garr as Denise Sandler
- Margaret Whitton as Genevieve "Genny" Sandler
- Mark Blankfield as George
- Lane Davies as Dr. Eric Haan
- Mary Gillis as Mary
- Seth Green as David Sandler
- Sherman Howard as Roger
- Marian Seldes as Charlotte Sandler
- Brooke Theiss as Caroline Sandler
- William Shockley as Sonny (eps. 3–6)
- Lane Smith as Harlan Shell (eps. 2–5)
- Marius Weyers as Ronald Ethan

== Episodes ==
| No. | Title | Directed by | Written by | Original release date | Viewers (millions) |
|---|---|---|---|---|---|
| 1 | "Pilot" | Terry Hughes | Susan Harris | September 25, 1991 | 14.1 |
| 2 | "Episode 2" | Terry Hughes | Tom Straw | October 2, 1991 | 9.4 |
| 3 | "Episode 3" | Terry Hughes | Bob Underwood | October 9, 1991 | 10.8 |
| 4 | "Episode 4" | Terry Hughes | Bill Bryan | October 16, 1991 | 10.1 |
| 5 | "Episode 5" | Terry Hughes | Valerie J. Curtin | October 23, 1991 | 8.0 |
| 6 | "Episode 6" | Terry Hughes | Story by : Valerie Curtin & Bill Bryan; Teleplay by : Bob Underwood & Tom Straw | October 30, 1991 | 9.2 |
| 7 | "Episode 7" | N/A | N/A | Unaired | N/A |
| 8 | "Episode 8" | N/A | N/A | Unaired | N/A |
| 9 | "Episode 9" | N/A | N/A | Unaired | N/A |
| 10 | "Episode 10" | N/A | N/A | Unaired | N/A |
| 11 | "Episode 11" | N/A | N/A | Unaired | N/A |

== Sources ==
Brooks, Tim and Marsh, Earle, The Complete Directory to Prime Time Network and Cable TV Shows
