= 1990 in American television =

In 1990, television in the United States saw a number of significant events, including the debuts, finales, and cancellations of television shows; the launch, closure, and rebranding of channels; changes and additions to network affiliations by stations; controversies, business transactions, and carriage disputes; and the deaths of individuals who had made notable contributions to the medium.

== Notable events ==
| Date | Event |
|---|---|
| January 2 | All My Children broadcasts its 20th anniversary special on ABC. Joe and Ruth Martin sit down with Erica Kane, her mother Mona, and Phoebe Wallingford as they go through scrapbook pictures which segue into memorable clips from the series's past twenty years. |
| January 8 | Deborah Norville makes her debut as co-anchor on NBC's Today (succeeding Jane Pauley) alongside Bryant Gumbel. |
| January 10 | Time Warner is formed. |
| January 13 | Married... with Children star Ed O'Neill guest–hosts Saturday Night Live, becoming the first star of a Fox television program to host the NBC sketch comedy series. |
| January 13 | An episode of the Canadian teen drama series Degrassi High entitled "A New Start" is first broadcast on American television via PBS. The episode is notable as it was the first in the Degrassi franchise to depict abortion. In the PBS broadcast, the final scene, in which Erica and Heather are accosted by anti-abortion picketers as they make their way up to the clinic, is removed. The episode instead, ends on a shot of the twins looking on before they do so. |
| January 14 | The first regular episode of The Simpsons premieres on Fox, "Bart the Genius". |
| January 20 | "Too Much, Too Late", the fourth and final "lost episode" of Miami Vice to air after its series finale, "Freefall", is first broadcast on the USA Network. It was not aired on NBC due to its strong subject matter pertaining to child molestation. |
| January 21 | NBC broadcasts the National Hockey League All-Star Game from Pittsburgh. This was the first NHL game of any kind to be televised on American network television since game six of the 1980 Stanley Cup Final on CBS. |
| February 6 | NBC and the University of Notre Dame announce a deal that would call for the network to have exclusive rights to the Fighting Irish football team's home games, beginning in 1991. |
| February 6 | WZTV became a Fox affiliate in Nashville, replacing WXMT, which became an independent station. This was partly due to the fact that Michael Thompson had bought out the station from TVX, which resulted in the loss of the Fox affiliation and the move to a higher-rated station. |
| February 9 | The Bradys, a sequel and continuation of the original 1969–1974 sitcom The Brady Bunch premieres on CBS. The Bradys involved more dramatic storytelling than that which viewers had seen in the previous Brady series such as the previous Brady Bunch sequel series, 1981's The Brady Brides. Airing on Friday nights, The Bradys would ultimately fail in the ratings against Full House and Family Matters as part of the TGIF lineup on ABC and is canceled after one month; the last of the six episodes produced would air on March 9, 1990. |
| February 17 | On NBC, Aerosmith appear in Wayne's World, a recurring sketch on Saturday Night Live, where they perform the Wayne's World theme song. |
| February 18 | The Death of the Incredible Hulk, the third and final installment of the revival films based on the 1978–1982 television series The Incredible Hulk starring Bill Bixby and Lou Ferrigno is broadcast on NBC. Despite Hulk's death in the film, a script is written for a sequel television film, The Revenge of the Incredible Hulk, which would resurrect the character, but it is ultimately canceled because of the disappointing ratings for The Death of the Incredible Hulk. |
| February 24 | The series finale of Mama's Family is broadcast in first-run syndication. In it, Naomi gives birth to a baby girl, who is named Tiffany Thelma. |
| February 25 | Challenger, a made-for-television docudrama about the tragic events of the Space Shuttle Challenger disaster on January 28, 1986 is broadcast on ABC. Its production is somewhat controversial as the families of the astronauts generally objected to it. |
| March 4 | On SportsCenter, ESPN broadcasts the graphic footage of Loyola Marymount University basketball player Hank Gathers' collapse and subsequent death from a heart condition during a West Coast Conference (WCC) Tournament game. The network was at the game recording advance footage for the championship game it was scheduled to televise the next night. The tournament final was ultimately canceled in wake of Gathers' death and LMU was given the league's automatic bid to that year's NCAA tournament by virtue of its regular-season league championship. |
| March 12 | CBS affiliate in Boston, WNEV-TV changes its name to WHDH-TV. |
| March 13 | All My Children actress Debbi Morgan quits the role of Angie Baxter Hubbard. |
| March 24 | The season-ending cliffhanger of ALF, "Consider Me Gone", becomes an unintentional series finale when NBC gives Alien Productions a verbal commitment for a fifth season, but ultimately withdraws its support. ABC resolved the cliffhanger on February 17, 1996, with the TV movie Project: ALF. |
| March 30 | Radio host Rush Limbaugh makes headlines when he guest hosts The Pat Sajak Show on CBS, and, in a departure from its regular format, enters the audience to get a response about the veto of a bill in Idaho that would have restricted abortion. Directly after announcing that the bill was vetoed, Limbaugh went to the first woman who stood up and was cheering the loudest. The woman denounced Limbaugh's anti-abortion statements earlier in the show. After a verbal confrontation with the angry woman in the audience, followed by an angry man shouting, Limbaugh addresses the camera and stated that he went into the audience in an attempt to show the viewing public that there was an underlying prejudice against him. Due to this, Limbaugh decides to conduct his interview with Sydney Biddle Barrows in another studio. After a commercial break, Limbaugh attempts to address the topic of affirmative action, but was backed out again by several male audience members wearing ACT UP T-shirts. After another break, Limbaugh returned and conducted the final segment after the audience had been cleared. |
| April 1 | CBS dismisses prominent sportscaster Brent Musburger one day before his final assignment for the network, the NCAA Men's Basketball Championship. Later that year, Musburger signs with ABC Sports. |
| April 1 | In what is dubbed "The Ultimate Challenge", The Ultimate Warrior defeats Hulk Hogan for the WWF World Heavyweight Championship at WrestleMania VI from Toronto's SkyDome. The pay-per-view event marks the first time that WrestleMania was held outside of the United States. |
| April 8 | The pilot episode for Twin Peaks airs on ABC. The two-hour pilot is the highest-rated movie for the 1989–1990 season with a 21.7 rating and is viewed by 34.6 million people. In Los Angeles, Twin Peaks becomes the seventh most-watched show of the week earning 29% of viewers, the most-watched show being Married... with Children which gathers 34% of viewers. |
| April 14 | CBS officially assumes the role as Major League Baseball's network broadcast partner (succeeding both ABC and NBC under a four-year deal through the end of the 1993 season) with coverage of the Chicago Cubs at Pittsburgh and Los Angeles at Houston. |
| April 15 | Sunday Night Baseball debuts on ESPN with coverage of the New York Mets against the Montreal Expos. |
| April 15 | The Living Daylights makes its network broadcast television premiere on ABC. This would be the final time that a James Bond film would make its American television debut on ABC. The next Bond film, Licence to Kill would premiere on Fox in 1993. ABC wouldn't broadcast the Bond series again until 2002 under the title The Bond Picture Show. |
| April 21 | Cartoon All-Stars to the Rescue, a special program warning children about the inconvenience of drugs and featuring characters from several Saturday morning children's shows, is simultaneously simulcast by ABC, BET, CBS, Fox, NBC, USA Network, and Nickelodeon. |
| April 22 | The Earth Day Special, a two-hour commercial-free special event, premieres on ABC. |
| April 27 | Barbara Bel Geddes makes her final appearance on the CBS drama Dallas as Miss Ellie Ewing. |
| April 30 | The long-lost pilot show for I Love Lucy is broadcast by CBS as a special. |
| May 4 | Muppets creator Jim Henson makes what turns out to be his final public appearance when he appears as a guest on The Arsenio Hall Show. Henson would die less than two weeks later. |
| May 7 | Stepfanie Kramer makes her final appearance as Sgt. Dee Dee McCall on the NBC police drama Hunter. |
| May 12 | Comedian Andrew Dice Clay guest-hosts Saturday Night Live. Cast member Nora Dunn immediately announces to the press that she was boycotting the show in protest. She stated the protest was in view of Clay's perceivably misogynistic act, and did so without informing executive producer Lorne Michaels, the cast, or most of the crew about her intent. Sinéad O'Connor was scheduled to be the musical guest for the episode, but she also boycotted the show because of Clay's involvement, forcing the producers to find two musical replacements, with one performance by Julee Cruise and a second by Spanic Boys. NBC censors insisted that the episode be aired with a delay to compensate for anything Clay might say on air. During the live show, some audience members protested Clay but were immediately removed by the increased security detail. |
| May 18 | The made–for–TV film Return to Green Acres, which reunited Eddie Albert, Eva Gabor, and the rest of the surviving cast of the 1965–1971 sitcom Green Acres, is broadcast on CBS. |
| May 21 | CBS broadcasts the series finale of Newhart, in which it is revealed that the entire series was really just a dream of Bob Newhart's character, Dr. Bob Hartley from The Bob Newhart Show. |
| May 25 | CBS begins broadcasting its daytime lineup in stereo sound, becoming the last of the three major networks to do so. |
| May 25 | The series finale of You Can't Do That on Television is broadcast on Nickelodeon. For its tenth and final season, only five episodes are produced (tying 1990 with 1987 as the shortest season of the series), with production ending in February. This is also one of the rare times in television where a show's cast and producer's knew they would not be coming back, allowing them to make several in-jokes and references to this being the final show of the series, despite it not being a proper "finale". Though ratings decline, Nickelodeon continues to air reruns until January 1994, at which point it is only aired on weekends. |
| June 1 | Mariah Carey delivers her first live television performance (singing "Vision of Love") on The Arsenio Hall Show. |
| June 6 | The character Taylor Hayes (originally portrayed by actress Hunter Tylo) makes her first appearance on the CBS soap opera The Bold and the Beautiful. |
| June 7 | The start of the Cruise of Deception storyline is broadcast on the NBC soap opera Days of Our Lives, lasting through July 16, 1990. The story includes several of the show's most popular characters attending a masked ball on a cruise ship, which is taken over by a vengeful Ernesto Toscano, played by Charles Cioffi. The miniseries acts as the climax of several stories that had been developing previously to it, and the launching pad of several more, some of which would play out through most of the 1990s. NBC promotes the story heavily to lure kids home from school to watch the show during their summer vacation. |
| June 7 | Nickelodeon Studios officially opens in Orlando, Florida. |
| June 14 | CBS concludes their 17-year run with the NBA, as the league was moving to NBC after the 1990 NBA Finals. In their goodbye montage, CBS used Marvin Gaye's rendition of "The Star-Spangled Banner" from the 1983 NBA All-Star Game. |
| June 18 | In first-run syndication, Season 3 of Star Trek: The Next Generation ends on a cliffhanger involving Captain Picard being captured and assimilated by the Borg. |
| June 27 | Genie Francis, in an attempt to shed her image as Laura Spencer on ABC's soap opera General Hospital, starts playing Irishwoman Ceara Connor on All My Children (which also airs on ABC). |
| June 27 | WUTV officially became a Fox affiliate in Buffalo again after Act III Broadcasting took control of the station, and acquired stronger programming and the Fox affiliation rights from WNYB-TV, which was then sold to the Tri-State Christian Television. |
| June 29 | Pinwheel, the very first show to air on Nickelodeon as well as its Nick Jr. block, is broadcast on the network for the final time. |
| July 1 | WPTY-TV became a Fox affiliate in Memphis, replacing WLMT. This was due to the station's higher ratings, and WLMT lost the Fox affiliation because there is a clause that Michael Thompson bought out the station from TVX in 1989, which resulted in the loss of its affiliation. |
| July 5 | ABC airs the National Academy of Dance's first annual Gypsy Awards from the San Diego Convention Center. Taped on January 19, America's Dance Honors is notable for marking Sammy Davis Jr.'s final public appearance prior to his death on May 16. Liza Minnelli taped a special introduction to the show in light Davis' death. Later that December, Davis gave his final acting performance in the made-for-TV film The Kid Who Loved Christmas. |
| July 10 | CBS broadcasts the first of four consecutive Major League Baseball All-Star Games. Unfortunately, the 1990 edition from Chicago's Wrigley Field, is interrupted by a rain delay in the top of the seventh inning. During the delay, CBS airs Rescue 911. |
| July 16 | Radio DJ personality Rick Dees debuts an ABC late-night talk show, Into the Night, Starring Rick Dees. |
| July 16 | Johnny Depp makes his final appearance as Officer Tom Hanson on 21 Jump Street. This is also the final episode to be broadcast on Fox as for its fifth and ultimately final season, 21 Jump Street would air in first–run syndication. |
| July 30 | MovieTime, which initially launched on July 31, 1987 as a national barker service to air movie trailers, entertainment news, event and awards coverage, and interviews is rebranded as E!. This name change is made to emphasize its widening coverage of the celebrity–industrial complex, contemporary film, television and music, daily Hollywood gossip, and fashion. |
| July 31 | Memories of Murder, the first ever film to be produced for the Lifetime Television Network is broadcast. |
| August 10 | The American Wrestling Association holds its final television taping. |
| August 17 | CBS airs an unsold half-hour pilot that's based on the film Steel Magnolias. The cast includes Cindy Williams as M'Lynn, Sally Kirkland as Truvy, Elaine Stritch as Ouiser, Polly Bergen as Clairee, and Sheila McCarthy as Annelle. |
| August 23 | The pilot episode for Ferris Bueller, an adaptation of the 1986 film Ferris Bueller's Day Off, is broadcast on NBC. In said pilot, Ferris (Charlie Schlatter) refers to the film and expresses his displeasure at Matthew Broderick portraying him, even going as far as destroying a life-size cardboard cutout of Broderick with a chainsaw. The show would ultimately be cancelled after its first season and only 13 episodes due to its poor reception. It would also suffer from comparisons to another series, Fox's Parker Lewis Can't Lose, which proves to be more successful when it comes to ratings, lasting for three seasons. |
| August 25 | The Smurfs airs its final rerun on NBC after a nine-season run (its final original episode having aired on December 2, 1989), clearing its Saturday morning timeslot for Captain N & The Adventures of Super Mario Bros. 3 the following month. |
| September 8 | Fox Kids, a children's programming block, debuts on Fox. |
| September 8 | Teenage Mutant Ninja Turtles makes its debut on CBS, where it will run through 1996. First–run episodes will continue to be broadcast in syndication until the end of its fourth season in March 1991. |
| September 8 | The Saturday morning adaptation of Super Mario Bros. 3 and the second Mario adaptation for animation television, The Adventures of Super Mario Bros. 3, debuts on NBC and it pairs with Captain N: The Game Master, with both shows being part of the Captain N & The Adventures of Super Mario Bros. 3 programming block, and the new Mario show replaced The Smurfs reruns, which aired for the final time on August 25, after that show's nine-season run had concluded on December 2, 1989. |
| September 9 | CBS debuts a brand new look for The NFL Today, front-lined by Greg Gumbel and Terry Bradshaw. Gumbel and Bradshaw replaced Brent Musburger and Irv Cross respectively. The two would remain on The NFL Today until CBS lost their NFL rights to Fox at the end of the 1993 season. |
| September 9 | TNT broadcasts their first Sunday night NFL game with the Philadelphia Eagles visiting the New York Giants. |
| September 10 | The Disney Afternoon debuts as a syndicated children's block. |
| September 12 | Univision broadcasts the final of the 13th National OTI Festival live from the Gusman Center for the Performing Arts in Miami. |
| September 12–14 | Wheel of Fortune contestant Mindy Mitola won a total of $146,014 cash & prizes accumulated for her 3-day stint in the show, setting an all-time winnings record for the program, surpassing Diane Landry's $129,370 held last year. This record would last for almost five years until Peter Argyropolous and Deborah Cohen surpassed her record on February 8–9, 1996 with $146,529. At the time, she also became the biggest winner (for any individual contestant) in the program until more than 18 years later on October 14, 2008, where Michelle Lowenstein surpassed her total with $1,026,080. |
| September 13 | The premiere episode of Law & Order is broadcast on NBC. The actual pilot episode, "Everybody's Favorite Bagman", which was filmed two years prior to the rest of the first season, would ultimately air as the sixth episode. |
| September 15 | The CBN Family Channel renames itself The Family Channel. By this point, the network had grown too profitable to remain under the Christian Broadcasting Network umbrella without endangering the ministry's non-profit status. |
| September 15 | Captain Planet and the Planeteers, an animated environmental edutainment series that was created by created by Barbara Pyle and Ted Turner premieres on Turner's cable channel TBS. |
| September 16 | WSYM in Lansing officially became a Fox television station. |
| September 23–27 | The Ken Burns directed miniseries The Civil War is broadcast on PBS. More than 39 million viewers would tune in to at least one episode, and viewership averaged more than 14 million viewers each evening, making it the most-watched program ever to air on PBS. |
| September 26 | Cop Rock, a police procedural series that mixes music and choreography throughout storylines debuts on ABC. The show is a critical and commercial failure and is canceled by ABC after 11 episodes. The combination of a fusion of musical performances with serious police drama and dark humor with its high-powered production talent, make it infamous as one of the biggest television failures of the 1990s. TV Guide Magazine would rank it #8 on its List of the 50 Worst TV Shows of All Time list in 2002 and dubs it "the single most bizarre TV musical of all time". |
| October 1 | The very first edition of UWF Fury Hour airs from Reseda Country Club in Reseda, California on SportsChannel America. |
| October 6 | All My Children star Susan Lucci guest–hosts an episode of Saturday Night Live, becoming the first daytime soap opera performer to do so. |
| October 13 | WLAJ in Jackson, Michigan signs-on the air, giving the Lansing market its first full-time ABC affiliate. |
| October 20–26 | CBS airs the first of four consecutive World Series. The Cincinnati Reds sweep the heavily favored and defending world champions, the Oakland Athletics in four games to win their first world title since 1976. |
| November 3 | The NBA on NBC debuts on NBC, with its first game being the Los Angeles Lakers visiting the San Antonio Spurs. |
| November 10 | Chris Farley, Tim Meadows, Chris Rock, Adam Sandler, Rob Schneider, David Spade and Julia Sweeney join the cast of Saturday Night Live. |
| November 10 | The series finale of Charles in Charge airs in first-run syndication. In the finale, Sarah puts on a show to raise money, and Charles directs while preparing for an interview to get into Princeton. |
| November 17 | ESPN broadcasts the Notre Dame Fighting Irish's college football game against the 1990 Penn State Nittany Lions. This is to date, the final time that a television network other than NBC, would broadcast Notre Dame's home games. On September 7, 1991, NBC would start televising Notre Dame's home games; it would become the first Division I-A football program to have all of its home games televised exclusively by one television network. |
| November 17 | The last original episode of Pee-wee's Playhouse airs on CBS. In July 1991, series star Paul Reubens is arrested for exposing himself in a Sarasota, Florida, adult movie theater, prompting CBS to immediately stop airing its Playhouse re-runs, which are originally intended to air until late 1991. The show is replaced by reruns of The Adventures of Raggedy Ann and Andy. |
| November 18–20 | The two-episode television miniseries adaptation of Stephen King's 1986 epic supernatural horror novel It premiered on the American Broadcasting Company. |
| November 22 | The Undertaker makes his World Wrestling Federation debut at the fourth annual Survivor Series pay-per-view event. |
| December 1 | Univision stages the 19th OTI Festival at the Circus Maximus of the Caesars Palace in Las Vegas, which is broadcast live throughout Ibero-America. |
| December 3 | ABC attracts a great deal of controversy when it airs Madonna's infamous music video for her single "Justify My Love" on its late-night news program Nightline, as part of an interview with the singer on the video's explicit sexual content. The broadcast follows across-the-board bans of the video by MTV and other networks around the world. |
| December 10 | Following his broadcast of a Chicago Bears–Washington Redskins NFL game, CBS announcer Pat Summerall is hospitalized with a bleeding ulcer after vomiting on a plane during a flight. Summerall would be out for a considerable amount of time. While Verne Lundquist replaced Summerall on games with John Madden, Jack Buck (who was at CBS during the time as the network's lead Major League Baseball announcer) was added as a regular NFL broadcaster to fill-in. |
| December 25 | Kathleen Bradley makes her debut as one of "Barker's Beauties" on The Price Is Right. Bradley is the first permanent African American model on the CBS game show. |

== Programs ==
=== Debuts ===
The following is a list of shows that premiered in 1990.

| Date | Show | Channel |
|---|---|---|
| August 15 | The Baby-Sitters Club | HBO |
| January 1 | Maya the Bee | Nickelodeon |
| January 5 | Max Monroe: Loose Cannon | CBS |
| January 6 | Zorro | CBN Family Channel |
| January 24 | Peter Jennings Reporting | ABC |
| January 26 | Pirate TV | MTV |
| January 28 | Grand Slam | CBS |
| January 29 | City | CBS |
| February 6 | Rodeo Drive | Lifetime |
| February 9 | The Bradys | CBS |
| February 19 | Nasty Boys | NBC |
| February 25 | A Family for Joe | NBC |
| March 3 | H.E.L.P. | ABC |
| March 5 | His & Hers | CBS |
| March 21 | Normal Life | CBS |
| March 21 | Sydney | CBS |
| March 25 | The Outsiders | Fox |
| March 27 | Equal Justice | ABC |
| March 30 | Bagdad Café | CBS |
| March 30 | Sugar and Spice | CBS |
| March 31 | Carol & Company | NBC |
| April 1 | On the Television | Nick at Nite |
| April 4 | The Marshall Chronicles | ABC |
| April 8 | Twin Peaks | ABC |
| April 9 | Capital News | ABC |
| April 12 | Down Home | NBC |
| April 14 | Major League Baseball on CBS | CBS |
| April 15 | In Living Color | Fox |
| April 15 | Sunday Night Baseball | ESPN |
| April 16 | Working Girl | NBC |
| April 19 | Wings | NBC |
| April 21 | Sunset Beat | ABC |
| May 1 | Brewster Place | ABC |
| May 1 | Clash! | Ha! |
| May 13 | America's Funniest People | ABC |
| June 1 | Great Getaway Game | The Travel Channel |
| June 16 | Monopoly | ABC |
| July 4 | SK8-TV | Nickelodeon |
| July 4 | Wild & Crazy Kids | Nickelodeon |
| July 5 | Blossom | NBC |
| July 8 | Dream On | HBO |
| July 12 | Northern Exposure | CBS |
| July 14 | The Howard Stern Show (1990 TV program) | WWOR-TV |
| July 16 | Into the Night starring Rick Dees | ABC |
| July 17 | Real Life with Jane Pauley | NBC |
| July 27 | Swamp Thing | USA Network |
| July 29 | Tim Conway's Funny America | ABC |
| August 8 | New Attitude | ABC |
| August 13 | Outta Here! | Nickelodeon |
| August 20 | Parenthood | NBC |
| August 22 | Working It Out | NBC |
| August 23 | Ferris Bueller | NBC |
| August 25 | Jim Henson's Mother Goose Stories | The Disney Channel |
| August 27 | Guys Next Door | NBC |
| September 1 | Midnight Patrol: Adventures in the Dream Zone | Syndication |
| September 1 | Haywire | Fox |
| September 2 | Parker Lewis Can't Lose | Fox |
| September 2 | Big Brother Jake | CBN Family Channel |
| September 2 | Bob Vila's Home Again | Syndication |
| September 3 | The Challengers | Syndication |
| September 3 | Instant Recall | Syndication |
| September 3 | Personalities | Syndication |
| September 4 | Barnyard Commandos | Syndication |
| September 7 | D.E.A. | Fox |
| September 7 | American Chronicles | Fox |
| September 7 | TaleSpin | The Disney Channel, Syndication |
September 8
| September 8 | Attack of the Killer Tomatoes | Fox Kids |
| September 8 | Bobby's World | Fox Kids |
| September 8 | Peter Pan & the Pirates | Fox Kids |
| September 8 | Zazoo U | Fox Kids |
| September 8 | New Kids on the Block | ABC |
| September 8 | Little Rosey | ABC |
| September 8 | The Wizard of Oz | ABC |
| September 8 | The Adventures of Super Mario Bros. 3 | NBC |
| September 8 | The Fanelli Boys | NBC |
| September 8 | Tom & Jerry Kids | NBC |
| September 8 | Gravedale High | NBC |
| September 8 | Kid 'n Play | NBC |
| September 10 | The Fresh Prince of Bel-Air | NBC |
| September 10 | The New Adventures of He-Man | USA Network |
| September 10 | Quiz Kids Challenge | Syndication |
| September 10 | Trump Card | Syndication |
| September 10 | Lenny | CBS |
| September 10 | Uncle Buck | CBS |
| September 11 | The Family Man | CBS |
| September 13 | Law & Order | NBC |
| September 13 | Babes | Fox |
| September 14 | Tiny Toon Adventures | CBS, Syndication, Fox Kids |
| September 15 | The Adventures of the Black Stallion | The Family Channel |
| September 15 | Bill & Ted's Excellent Adventures | CBS |
| September 15 | Captain Planet and the Planeteers | TBS |
| September 15 | Piggsburg Pigs! | Fox Kids |
| September 16 | The Adventures of Don Coyote and Sancho Panda | Syndication |
| September 16 | E.A.R.T.H. Force | CBS |
| September 17 | The Trials of Rosie O'Neill | CBS |
| September 17 | Preview: The Best of the New | Syndication |
| September 17 | Wake, Rattle & Roll | Syndication |
| September 18 | Married People | ABC |
| September 20 | American Dreamer | NBC |
| September 20 | The Flash | CBS |
| September 20 | Top Cops | CBS |
| September 21 | Evening Shade | CBS |
| September 21 | Going Places | ABC |
| September 23 | Against the Law | Fox |
| September 23 | Get a Life | Fox |
| September 24 | Adam-12 | Syndication |
| September 24 | My Talk Show | Syndication |
| September 26 | Cop Rock | ABC |
| September 29 | Dracula: The Series | Syndication |
| September 29 | Widget the World Watcher | Syndication |
| September 30 | The Jesse Jackson Show | Syndication |
| September 30 | Good Grief | Fox |
| October 1 | America Tonight | CBS |
| October 1 | UWF Fury Hour | SportsChannel America |
| October 1 | Video Power | Syndication |
| October 4 | Beverly Hills, 90210 | Fox |
| October 15 | Screen Scene | BET |
| October 24 | WIOU | CBS |
| October 27 | NBA Inside Stuff | NBC |
| November 2 | Over My Dead Body | CBS |
| November 3 | NBA on NBC | NBC |

=== Entering syndication this year ===
A list of programs (current or canceled) that have accumulated enough episodes (between 65 and 100) or seasons (3 or more) to be eligible for off-network syndication and/or basic cable runs.

| Show | Seasons |
|---|---|
| The Golden Girls | 5 |
| Perfect Strangers | 5 |
| 227 | 5 |

=== Changes of network affiliation ===
The following shows aired new episodes on a different network than previous first-run episodes:

| Show | Moved from | Moved to |
|---|---|---|
| Night Flight | USA Network | Syndication |
| TaleSpin | The Disney Channel | Syndication |
| 21 Jump Street | Fox | Syndication |
| Disney's Adventures of the Gummi Bears | ABC | Syndication |
| Supermarket Sweep | ABC | Lifetime |
| The Hogan Family | NBC | CBS |
| The Major League Baseball Game of the Week | NBC | CBS |
| Teenage Mutant Ninja Turtles | Syndication | CBS |
| Let's Make a Deal | Syndication | NBC |
| To Tell the Truth | Syndication | NBC |
| Match Game | Syndication | ABC |
| Father Dowling Mysteries | NBC | ABC |
| Fun House | Syndication | Fox |

=== Returning this year ===
| Show | Last aired | Previous network | New network | Returning |
|---|---|---|---|---|
| Supermarket Sweep | 1967 | ABC | Lifetime | February 5 |
| Match Game | 1982 | Syndication | ABC | July 16 |
| Let's Make a Deal | 1986 | Syndication | NBC | July 16 |
| To Tell The Truth | 1981 | Syndication | NBC | September 3 |
| The Joker's Wild | 1986 | Syndication | Same | September 10 |
| Tic-Tac-Dough | 1986 | Syndication | Same | September 10 |

=== Ending this year ===
| Date | Show | Debut |
|---|---|---|
| January 14 | Free Spirit | 1989 |
| January 21 | Fantastic Max | 1988 |
| January 25 | Miami Vice | 1984 |
| February 24 | Mission: Impossible | 1988 |
| March 5 | Eyes on the Prize | 1987 |
| March 9 | The Bradys | 1990 |
| March 12 | Mama's Family | 1983 |
| March 12 | Freddy's Nightmares | 1988 |
| March 15 | Island Son | 1989 |
| March 23 | Scrabble (returned in 1993) | 1984 |
| March 24 | ALF | 1986 |
| March 26 | The Baby-Sitters Club | 1990 |
| March 30 | Think Fast | 1989 |
| April 6 | Baywatch (returned in 1991) | 1989 |
| April 13 | The Pat Sajak Show | 1989 |
| April 14 | H.E.L.P. | 1990 |
| April 24 | Mancuso, F.B.I. | 1989 |
| April 28 | Tour of Duty | 1987 |
| April 30 | My Two Dads | 1987 |
| May 4 | Just the Ten of Us | 1988 |
| May 6 | 227 | 1985 |
| May 6 | Booker | 1989 |
| May 7 | Alien Nation | 1989 |
| May 12 | The Famous Teddy Z | 1989 |
| May 14 | War of the Worlds | 1988 |
| May 17 | Falcon Crest | 1981 |
| May 21 | Newhart | 1982 |
| May 25 | You Can't Do That on Television | 1981 |
| May 26 | Friday the 13th: The Series | 1987 |
| May 26 | The Tracey Ullman Show | 1987 |
| June 14 | NBA on CBS | 1973 |
| June 28 | Wolf | 1989 |
| June 29 | Hardball | 1989 |
| July 6 | Snoops | 1989 |
| July 6 | Pinwheel | 1977 |
| July 8 | Mr. Belvedere | 1985 |
| July 21 | Open House | 1989 |
| July 30 | Sister Kate | 1989 |
| August 4 | Beauty and the Beast | 1987 |
| August 19 | Ann Jillian | 1989 |
| August 31 | Rodeo Drive | 1990 |
| September 1 | Monopoly | 1990 |
| September 2 | Tim Conway's Funny America | 1990 |
| September 14 | Make the Grade | 1989 |
| September 29 | E.A.R.T.H. Force | 1990 |
| September 29 | SK8-TV | 1990 |
| November 10 | Charles in Charge | 1984 |
| November 17 | Pee-wee's Playhouse | 1986 |
| November 19 | Chip 'n Dale: Rescue Rangers | 1989 |
| November 28 | DuckTales (original series) (returned in 2017) | 1987 |
| December 1 | Alvin and the Chipmunks | 1983 |
| December 1 | The Adventures of Super Mario Bros. 3 | 1990 |
| December 1 | Gravedale High | 1990 |
| December 7 | Tic-Tac-Dough | 1956 |
| December 8 | Wiseguy | 1987 |
| December 12 | Working It Out | 1990 |
| December 13 | Remote Control | 1987 |
| December 26 | Cop Rock | 1990 |
| December 28 | Quiz Kids Challenge | 1990 |
| December 28 | The Wizard of Oz | 1990 |
| December 30 | Hull High | 1990 |

=== Made-for-TV movies ===
| Title | Network | Date of airing |
|---|---|---|
| Murder in Mississippi | NBC | February 5 |
| The Death of the Incredible Hulk | NBC | February 18 |
| Challenger | ABC | February 25 |
| The Incident | CBS | March 4 |
| A Killing in a Small Town | CBS | May 22 |
| Psycho IV: The Beginning | NBC | November 10 |
| The Dreamer of Oz: The L. Frank Baum Story | NBC | December 10 |

== Networks and services ==
=== Launches ===
| Network | Type | Launch date | Notes | Source |
|---|---|---|---|---|
| International Channel | Cable television | Unknown | | |
| SportsChannel Philadelphia | Cable television | January 1 | | |
| WWOR EMI Service | Cable and satellite | January 1 | | |
| HA! TV Comedy Network | Cable television | April 1 | | |
| Star Television Network | Broadcast television | September 29 | | |
| Hollywood Premiere Network | Syndicated programming block | October 9 | | |

=== Conversions and rebrandings ===
| Old network name | New network name | Type | Conversion Date | Notes | Source |
|---|---|---|---|---|---|
| The Nostalgia Channel | Nostalgia Television | Cable television | Unknown | | |
| MovieTime | E! | Cable television | July 30 | | |
| CBN Family Channel | The Family Channel | Cable television | September 15 | | |

=== Closures ===
| Network | Type | Closure date | Notes | Source |
|---|---|---|---|---|
| Sports News Network | Cable and satellite | December 17 | | |

== Television stations ==
=== Station launches ===
| Date | City of License/Market | Station | Channel | Affiliation | Notes/Ref. |
|---|---|---|---|---|---|
| January 21 | Anchorage, Alaska | KYES-TV | 5 | Independent | |
| February 4 | Brownsville, Texas | K64FM | 64 | America's Store | |
| March 9 | Richmond, Virginia | WZXK | 65 | Independent | |
| March 15 | Springfield, Missouri | K15CZ | 15 | Independent | |
| March 29 | Chattanooga, Tennessee | W39AW | 39 | Independent | |
| April 2 | Brunswick, Georgia (Jacksonville, Florida) | WBSG-TV | 21 | Independent | |
| April 23 | Cedar City/St. George, Utah | KCCZ | 8 | Independent | |
| May 1 | Atlanta, Georgia | W07CP | 7 | | |
| May 5 | Fort Pierce, Florida | WTCE-TV | 21 | TBN | |
| July 1 | Denver, Colorado | KWHD | 53 | LeSEA | |
| August 15 | Knoxville, Tennessee | WKOP-TV | 15 | PBS | Satellite of WSJK-TV/Sneedville |
| August 27 | Sacramento, California | KCMY | 29 | Independent | |
| September 18 | Toledo, Ohio | W05BZ | 5 | The Box | |
| September 27 | Eugene, Oregon | KEPB-TV | 28 | PBS | Part of the Oregon Educational and Public Broadcasting Service (OEPBS) |
| September 30 | Richmond, Virginia | W14BN | 14 | Independent | |
| October 1 | Ventura, California (Los Angeles) | KSTV-TV | 57 | Galavision | |
| October 13 | Lansing, Michigan | WLAJ | 53 | ABC | |
| October 18 | Boulder, Colorado | KSHP | 50 | Independent | |
| October 22 | Naples/Fort Myers, Florida | WNPT-TV | 46 | Independent | Not to be confused with today's WNPT of Nashville |
| October 31 | Evansville, Indiana | W38BK | 38 | TBN | |
| November | Macon, Georgia | WGNM | 45 | Independent | |
| November 14 | Chico/Redding, California | KBCP | 20 | Independent | |
| December 5 | Toledo, Ohio | W38DH | 38 | The Box | |
| December 27 | Bethlehem, Pennsylvania | WBPH-TV | 60 | Religious independent | |
| Unknown date | Atlanta, Georgia | W67CI | 67 | Telemundo | |
| Unknown date | Bismarck, North Dakota | K46DY | 46 | TBN | |
| Unknown date | Charlotte, North Carolina | W26AZ | 26 | Daystar | |
| Unknown date | Columbia, Missouri | K02NQ | 2 | unknown | |
| Unknown date | Columbia, South Carolina | W51BR | 51 | | |
| Unknown date | Dothan, Alabama | W29BB | 29 | TBN | |
| Unknown date | Fort Bragg, California | KFWU | 8 | ABC | Satellite of KRCR-TV |
| Unknown date | Gulfport/Biloxi, Mississippi | W46AV | 46 | TBN | |
| Unknown date | Indianapolis, Indiana | W47AZ | 47 | The Box | |
| Unknown date | Minneapolis, Minnesota | K13UT | 13 | The Box | |
| Unknown date | Monterey, California | K53DT | 53 | TBN | |
| Tyler, Texas | K48DP | 48 | Independent | | |

=== Network affiliation changes ===
| Date | City of License/Market | Station | Channel | Old affiliation | New affiliation | Notes/Ref. |
|---|---|---|---|---|---|---|
| February 6 | Nashville, Tennessee | WZTV | 17 | Independent | Fox | |
| February 6 | Nashville, Tennessee | WXMT | 30 | Fox | Independent | |
| June 27 | Buffalo, New York | WUTV | 29 | Independent | Fox | |
| June 27 | Buffalo, New York | WNYB | 49 | Fox | TCT | |
| July 1 | Memphis, Tennessee | WPTY | 24 | Independent | Fox | |
| July 1 | Memphis, Tennessee | WLMT | 30 | Fox | Independent | |
| September 8 | Louisville, Kentucky | WHAS-TV | 11 | CBS | ABC | |
| September 8 | Louisville, Kentucky | WLKY-TV | 32 | ABC | CBS | |
| September 16 | Lansing, Michigan | WSYM | 47 | Independent | Fox | |
| Unknown date | Davenport, Iowa | KLJB-TV | 18 | Independent | Fox | Previously with Fox 1987-1988 |
| Unknown date | Saipan, Northern Mariana Islands | WSZE-TV | 10 | NBC (primary); CBS/ABC/Fox (secondary) | NBC (primary); CBS/ABC (secondary) | Satellite of KUAM-TV/Hagtna, Guam |

=== Station closures ===
| Date | City of license/Market | Station | Channel | Affiliation | Sign-on date | Notes |
|---|---|---|---|---|---|---|
| May 23 | New Orleans, Louisiana | WCCL | 49 | Independent (primary); CBS (secondary) | March 19, 1989 | |
| Unknown date | Key West, Florida | WETV | 13 | Educational independent | 1989 | |
| Unknown date | Owensboro, Kentucky | WROZ-TV | 61 | Independent | 1989 | |

== Births ==
| Date | Name | Notability |
|---|---|---|
| January 4 | Michelle Mylett | Canadian actress |
| January 4 | Spencer Rothbell | Voice actor (Clarence) |
| January 6 | Natalie Palamides | Actress (The Powerpuff Girls, Star vs. the Forces of Evil) |
| January 7 | Liam Aiken | Actor |
| January 7 | Camryn Grimes | Actress (The Young and the Restless) |
| January 10 | Trevante Rhodes | American television actor |
| January 12 | Jana Wissmann | American television personality |
| January 13 | Liam Hemsworth | Australian actor (Neighbours, The Elephant Princess, The Hunger Games) |
| January 14 | Kacy Catanzaro | Contestant on American Ninja Warrior and WWE wrestler |
| January 14 | Grant Gustin | Actor (Glee, The Flash) |
| January 15 | Chris Warren | Actor (High School Musical) |
| January 18 | Zeeko Zaki | Actor |
| January 26 | Christopher Massey | Actor (Zoey 101) |
| January 29 | MacKenzie Porter | Canadian actress (Dinosapien, Hell on Wheels, Travelers) |
| January 29 | Jessica D. Stone | Voice actress (Stanley) |
| January 30 | Jake Thomas | Actor (Lizzie McGuire, The Grim Adventures of Billy & Mandy, Cory in the House) |
| February 1 | Davi Santos | Actor |
| February 5 | Charlbi Dean | South African actress (Elementary, Black Lightning) (d. 2022) |
| February 6 | Dominic Sherwood | English actor (Shadowhunters) |
| February 8 | Christian Madsen | Actor |
| February 9 | Camille Winbush | Actress (The Bernie Mac Show) |
| February 14 | Jake Weary | Actor (As the World Turns, Fred: The Show, Animal Kingdom) |
| February 14 | Brett Dier | Canadian actor (Ravenswood, Jane the Virgin) |
| February 16 | The Weeknd | Singer |
| February 23 | Anjli Mohindra | Actress |
| February 27 | Lindsey Morgan | Actress (General Hospital, The 100) |
| February 28 | Georgina Leonidas | English actress (Harry Potter) |
| March 4 | Andrea Bowen | Actress (Desperate Housewives) |
| March 5 | Matt Rogers | Actor |
| March 7 | Daniel Samonas | Actor (Avatar: The Last Airbender, Wizards of Waverly Place) |
| March 13 | Alec Medlock | Actor (Drake & Josh) |
| March 13 | Emory Cohen | Actor (Smash) |
| March 13 | Sebastian Jude | Actor (Lizzie McGuire) |
| March 18 | Luke Tarsitano | Actor (Fudge) |
| March 24 | Keisha Castle-Hughes | Australian actress (Game of Thrones) |
| March 25 | Kiowa Gordon | Actor |
| March 26 | Carly Chaikin | Actress (Suburgatory, Mr. Robot) |
| March 30 | Cassie Scerbo | Actress (Dance Revolution, Make It or Break It, Randy Cunningham: 9th Grade Ninja) |
| March 30 | Allie Gonino | Actress (The Lying Game) |
| April 2 | Sawyer Fulton | Professional wrestler |
| April 3 | Natasha Negovanlis | Canadian actress (Carmilla) and singer |
| April 6 | Charlie McDermott | Actor (The Middle) |
| April 9 | Kristen Stewart | Actress (The Twilight Saga) |
| April 10 | Alex Pettyfer | English actor |
| April 10 | Maren Morris | Singer-songwriter |
| April 12 | Hannah Dunne | Actress (Mozart in the Jungle) |
| April 14 | Christian Alexander | Actor (General Hospital, The Lying Game) |
| April 15 | Emma Watson | Actress |
| April 18 | Britt Robertson | Actress (Swingtown, Life UneXpected, The Secret Circle, Under the Dome) |
| April 19 | Teo Olivares | Actor (Ned's Declassified School Survival Guide, Hannah Montana) |
| April 21 | Bree Essrig | YouTube personality and actress |
| April 22 | Machine Gun Kelly | Musician |
| April 23 | Matthew Underwood | Actor (Zoey 101) |
| April 23 | Dev Patel | Actor |
| May 1 | Caitlin Stasey | Actress (Neighbours) |
| May 2 | Kay Panabaker | Actress (Summerland, Phil of the Future, American Dragon: Jake Long, No Ordinary Family) |
| May 10 | Lauren Potter | Actress (Glee) |
| May 14 | Sasha Spielberg | Actress |
| May 16 | Marc John Jefferies | Voice actor (Fatherwood) |
| May 16 | Thomas Brodie-Sangster | English actor (Phineas and Ferb, Game of Thrones) |
| May 17 | Ross Butler | Actor (K.C. Undercover) |
| May 17 | Kree Harrison | Singer (American Idol) |
| May 17 | Leven Rambin | Actress (All My Children, Scoundrels) |
| May 18 | Luke Kleintank | Actor (Gossip Girl, The Young and the Restless, Bones, Pretty Little Liars, The Man in the High Castle) |
| May 19 | Crawford Wilson | Voice actor (Avatar: The Last Airbender) |
| May 21 | Scotty Leavenworth | Actor |
| May 25 | Ebonée Noel | Actress |
| May 26 | Madeleine Mantock | Actress |
| May 27 | Chris Colfer | Actor (Glee) |
| May 30 | Dean Collins | Actor (Jack & Bobby, The War at Home) |
| June 2 | Brittany Curran | American actress |
| June 9 | Lauren Socha | English actress |
| June 10 | Tristin Mays | Actress (Gullah Gullah Island, Private) |
| June 13 | Aaron Taylor-Johnson | English actor |
| June 15 | Denzel Whitaker | Actor (All That, Hannah Montana) |
| June 19 | Ashly Burch | Voice actress (Adventure Time, OK K.O.! Let's Be Heroes) |
| June 19 | Chuku Modu | Actor |
| June 20 | Jacob Wysocki | Actor |
| June 28 | Jasmine Richards | Canadian actress (Naturally, Sadie) |
| June 28 | Nick Purcell | Actor (The Troop) |
| July 2 | Margot Robbie | Australian actress (Pan Am) |
| July 2 | Kayla Harrison | American professional mixed martial artist |
| July 6 | Jeremy Suarez | Actor (The Bernie Mac Show) |
| July 11 | Connor Paolo | Actor (Gossip Girl, Revenge) |
| July 11 | Kelsey Sanders | Actress (Private) and singer |
| July 12 | Rachel Brosnahan | Actress (House of Cards, Manhattan) |
| July 16 | James Maslow | Actor (Big Time Rush) and singer |
| July 19 | Steven Anthony Lawrence | Actor (The Amanda Show, Even Stevens) |
| July 24 | Daveigh Chase | Actress (Oliver Beene, Lilo & Stitch: The Series, Big Love) (d. 2026) |
| July 24 | Jay McGuiness | British singer (The Wanted) |
| July 26 | Bianca Santos | Actress (The Fosters) |
| July 27 | Indiana Evans | Australian actress and singer (Snobs, Home and Away, H_{2}O: Just Add Water, Crownies, Secrets and Lies) |
| July 28 | Soulja Boy | Rapper |
| July 29 | Matt Prokop | Actor |
| July 29 | Munro Chambers | Canadian actor (The Latest Buzz) |
| July 30 | Eliot Sumner | Actor |
| August 1 | Jack O'Connell | British actor (Skins) |
| August 4 | Chet Hanks | Actor |
| August 9 | Adelaide Kane | Australian actress (Neighbours, Power Rangers RPM, Teen Wolf, Reign) |
| August 9 | Bill Skarsgård | Swedish actor (Hemlock Grove) |
| August 10 | Lucas Till | Actor |
| August 10 | Sydney Lemmon | Actress |
| August 14 | Miranda Rae Mayo | Actress |
| August 15 | Jennifer Lawrence | Actress (The Bill Engvall Show, The Hunger Games) |
| August 17 | Rachel Hurd-Wood | British actress (Home Fires) |
| August 25 | Kristos Andrews | Actor |
| August 28 | Katie Findlay | Canadian actress (The Killing, The Carrie Diaries, How to Get Away with Murder) |
| August 29 | Laura Ashley Samuels | Actress |
| August 29 | Nicole Gale Anderson | Actress (Jonas, Beauty & the Beast, Ravenswood) |
| September 2 | Merritt Patterson | Canadian actress (Ravenswood, The Royals) |
| September 8 | Ella Rae Peck | Actress (Gossip Girl, Welcome to the Family) |
| September 9 | Haley Reinhart | Musician (American Idol) |
| September 9 | Sarah Baker | Actress |
| September 10 | Eddy Martin | Actor (Just Jordan) |
| September 10 | Chandler Massey | Actor (Days of Our Lives) |
| September 12 | Wayne Dalglish | Actor (The O.C., Kickin' It) |
| September 14 | Lolly Adefope | Actress |
| September 14 | Harry McEntire | English actor |
| September 15 | Matt Shively | Actor (True Jackson, VP, The Troop) |
| September 20 | Phillip Phillips | Singer (American Idol) |
| September 21 | Allison Scagliotti | Actress (Drake & Josh, Warehouse 13, Stitchers) |
| September 21 | Christian Serratos | Actress (Ned's Declassified School Survival Guide, The Walking Dead) |
| September 25 | Hannah Gross | American actress |
| September 27 | Lola Kirke | English-American actress (Mozart in the Jungle) |
| September 28 | Kirsten Zien | Canadian actress (Kyle XY, The Lying Game) |
| September 29 | Doug Brochu | Actor (Sonny with a Chance, So Random!) |
| September 30 | Swerve Strickland | Pro wrestler |
| October 5 | Myles Jeffrey | Actor (Beverly Hills, 90210, Early Edition, Whatever Happened to Robot Jones?) |
| October 6 | Scarlett Byrne | Actress (Harry Potter, Falling Skies, The Vampire Diaries) |
| October 6 | Noah Robbins | Actor |
| October 7 | Ayla Kell | Actress (Make It or Break It) |
| October 8 | Trent Harmon | Singer (American Idol) |
| October 13 | Bailey Noble | Actress (First Day, True Blood) |
| October 18 | Jordan Calloway | Actress (Unfabulous) |
| October 18 | Carly Schroeder | Actress (Port Charles, General Hospital, Lizzie McGuire) |
| October 19 | Ciara Renée | Actress (Legends of Tomorrow) |
| October 20 | Galadriel Stineman | Actress (The Middle) |
| October 22 | Jonathan Lipnicki | Actor (The Jeff Foxworthy Show) |
| October 24 | Kirby Bliss Blanton | Actress |
| October 24 | LaMarcus Tinker | Actor (Cougar Town) |
| October 28 | Kianna Underwood | Actress (Little Bill, All That) |
| October 29 | Carlson Young | Actress (As the Bell Rings, Scream) |
| October 31 | Lil' JJ | Actor (All That, Just Jordan) |
| November 2 | Kendall Schmidt | Actor (Big Time Rush) and singer |
| November 4 | Jean-Luc Bilodeau | Actor |
| November 6 | Bowen Yang | Actor |
| November 13 | Kathleen Herles | Voice actress (Dora on Dora the Explorer (2000–07)) |
| November 17 | Shanica Knowles | Actress (Hannah Montana) |
| November 24 | Sarah Hyland | Actress (Modern Family) |
| November 26 | Rita Ora | Singer |
| November 29 | Diego Boneta | Mexican actor (Underemployed, Scream Queens) and singer |
| December 13 | Emily Peachey | Actress |
| December 20 | JoJo | American singer |
| December 21 | Mandeep Dhillon | Actress |
| December 23 | Anna Maria Perez de Tagle | Actress (Hannah Montana, Cake) |
| December 28 | David Archuleta | Singer (American Idol) and actor |

== Deaths ==
| Date | Name | Age | Notability |
|---|---|---|---|
| January 2 | Alan Hale | 68 | Actor (Skipper Jonas Grumby on Gilligan's Island) |
| January 9 | Northern Calloway | 41 | Actor (David on Sesame Street) |
| January 18 | Rusty Hamer | 42 | Former child actor (Make Room For Daddy) |
| January 20 | Barbara Stanwyck | 82 | Actress (The Barbara Stanwyck Show, The Big Valley) |
| March 24 | Ray Goulding | 68 | Comedian, half of the comedy team Bob and Ray |
| May 9 | Pauline Frederick | 82 | Journalist (ABC News, NBC News) |
| May 10 | Susan Oliver | 58 | Actress (Peyton Place) |
| May 14 | Franklyn Seales | 37 | Actor (Dexter on Silver Spoons) |
| May 16 | Jim Henson | 53 | Puppeteer (The Muppets creator) |
| May 16 | Sammy Davis Jr. | 64 | Actor and singer |
| May 25 | Vic Tayback | 60 | Actor (Mel Sharples on Alice) |
| June 4 | Jack Gilford | 82 | Actor (Cracker Jack commercials) |
| July 7 | Bill Cullen | 70 | Game show host (original host of The Price Is Right) |
| July 8 | Howard Duff | 76 | Actor (Felony Squad) |
| July 30 | Karl Weber | 74 | Actor (Arthur Tate in Search for Tomorrow) |
| August 15 | Viktor Tsoi | 28 | Soviet singer (Kino) |
| October 26 | William S. Paley | 89 | Founder and longtime head of CBS |
| November 3 | Mary Martin | 76 | Actress & singer (Peter Pan) |
| November 12 | Eve Arden | 82 | Actress (Our Miss Brooks) |
| November 27 | David White | 74 | Actor (Larry Tate on Bewitched) |
| December 2 | Bob Cummings | 80 | Actor (The Bob Cummings Show) |
| December 28 | Kiel Martin | 46 | Actor (Officer J.D. LaRue on Hill Street Blues) |

== See also ==
- 1990 in the United States
- List of American films of 1990
