= 1989–90 United States network television schedule =

The 1989–90 network television schedule for the four major English language commercial broadcast networks in the United States covers primetime hours from September 1989 through August 1990. The schedule is followed by a list per network of returning series, new series, and series cancelled after the 1988–89 season.

Beginning this season, Fox started their prime time expansion starting with Mondays.

This is the first season to feature entirely closed captioning programs on the Big Four networks.

This was the first time that two programs were tied for the no. 1 spot in the Nielsen ratings.

PBS is not included; member stations have local flexibility over most of their schedules and broadcast times for network shows may vary.

New series are highlighted in bold.

All times are U.S. Eastern and Pacific Time (except for some live sports or events). Subtract one hour for Central, Mountain, Alaska and Hawaii–Aleutian times.

Each of the 30 highest-rated shows is listed with its rank and rating as determined by Nielsen Media Research.

== Legend ==
- Light blue indicates local programming.
- Gray indicates encore programming.
- Blue-gray indicates news programming.
- Light green indicates sporting events.
- Red indicates series being burned off and other regularly scheduled programs, including specials and movies.
- Bronze indicates reruns of programming that originally aired on a cable channel.
- Lime indicates the number-one most-watched program of the season.
- Yellow indicates the top-10 most watched programs of the season.
- Cyan indicates the top-20 most watched programs of the season.
- Magenta indicates the top-30 most watched programs of the season.

== Sunday ==
Network		7:00 p.m.	7:30 p.m.	8:00 p.m.	8:30 p.m.	9:00 p.m.	9:30 p.m.	10:00 p.m.	10:30 p.m.
ABC	Fall	**Life Goes On**		**Free Spirit**	**Homeroom**	The ABC Sunday Night Movie			
ABC	Winter	**Life Goes On**		**America's Funniest Home Videos** (5/20.9)	**Free Spirit**	The ABC Sunday Night Movie			
ABC	Mid-winter	**Life Goes On**		**America's Funniest Home Videos** (5/20.9)	**Elvis**	The ABC Sunday Night Movie			
ABC	Spring	**Life Goes On**		**America's Funniest Home Videos** (5/20.9)	**America's Funniest Home Videos** (R)	The ABC Sunday Night Movie			
ABC	Summer	**Life Goes On**		**America's Funniest Home Videos** (5/20.9)	The ABC Sunday Night Movie				
ABC	Mid-summer	**Life Goes On**		**America's Funniest Home Videos** (5/20.9)	Mr. Belvedere	The ABC Sunday Night Movie			
ABC	Late summer	**Life Goes On**		**America's Funniest Home Videos** (5/20.9)	**Tim Conway's Funny America**	The ABC Sunday Night Movie			
CBS		60 Minutes (7/19.7)		Murder, She Wrote (13/17.7) (Tied with Chicken Soup)		CBS Sunday Movie (24/14.9) (Tied with Hunter)			
Fox	Fall	**Booker**		America's Most Wanted	Totally Hidden Video	Married... with Children	**Open House**	The Tracey Ullman Show	It's Garry Shandling's Show (R)
Fox	Winter	**Booker**		America's Most Wanted	**The Simpsons** (28/14.5) (Tied with Night Court and **Doogie Howser, M.D.**)	Married... with Children	**Open House**	The Tracey Ullman Show	It's Garry Shandling's Show (R)
Fox	Spring	**The Outsiders**		America's Most Wanted	**The Simpsons** (28/14.5) (Tied with Night Court and **Doogie Howser, M.D.**)	Married... with Children	**Open House**	**Booker**	
Fox	Summer	**The Outsiders**		America's Most Wanted	**The Simpsons** (28/14.5) (Tied with Night Court and **Doogie Howser, M.D.**)	Married... with Children	**In Living Color**	**Booker**	
NBC	Fall	**Brand New Life**		**Sister Kate**	My Two Dads	NBC Sunday Night Movie			
NBC	Late fall	The Magical World of Disney		**Sister Kate**	My Two Dads	NBC Sunday Night Movie			
NBC	Winter	The Magical World of Disney		**Ann Jillian**	**Sister Kate**	NBC Sunday Night Movie			
NBC	Spring	The Magical World of Disney				NBC Sunday Night Movie			
NBC	Mid-spring	The Magical World of Disney		ALF (R)	227	NBC Sunday Night Movie			
NBC	Summer	The Magical World of Disney				NBC Sunday Night Movie			
NBC	Late summer	**Ann Jillian**	**A Family for Joe**	The Magical World of Disney		NBC Sunday Night Movie			

Note: In Living Color premiered Sunday, April 15, 1990 at 9:30 PM on Fox.

== Monday ==
Network		8:00 p.m.	8:30 p.m.	9:00 p.m.	9:30 p.m.	10:00 p.m.	10:30 p.m.
ABC	Fall	MacGyver		Monday Night Football (10/18.1)			
ABC	Winter	MacGyver		The ABC Monday Night Movie			
ABC	Spring	MacGyver		China Beach		**Capital News**	
ABC	Mid-spring	**The Young Riders**		The ABC Monday Night Movie			
ABC	Summer	MacGyver		The ABC Monday Night Movie			
CBS	Fall	**Major Dad**	**The People Next Door**	Murphy Brown (27/14.7)	**The Famous Teddy Z**	Designing Women (22/15.3) (Tied with Full House)	Newhart
CBS	Mid-fall	**Major Dad**	**The Famous Teddy Z**	Murphy Brown (27/14.7)	Designing Women (22/15.3) (Tied with Full House)	Newhart	Doctor Doctor
CBS	Winter	**Major Dad**	**City**	Murphy Brown (27/14.7)	Designing Women (22/15.3) (Tied with Full House)	Newhart	Doctor Doctor
CBS	Spring	**Major Dad**	**City**	Murphy Brown (27/14.7)	Designing Women (22/15.3) (Tied with Full House)	Newhart	**His & Hers**
CBS	Mid-spring	**Major Dad**	Newhart	Murphy Brown (27/14.7)	Designing Women (22/15.3) (Tied with Full House)	Special programming	
CBS	Summer	**Major Dad**	**Sydney**	Murphy Brown (27/14.7)	Designing Women (22/15.3) (Tied with Full House)	Newhart	**The Dave Thomas Comedy Show**
CBS	Mid-summer	**Major Dad**	Doctor Doctor	Murphy Brown (27/14.7)	Designing Women (22/15.3) (Tied with Full House)	**Saturday Night with Connie Chung**	
Fox		21 Jump Street		**Alien Nation**		Local programming	
NBC	Fall	ALF	The Hogan Family	NBC Monday Night at the Movies			
NBC	Winter	ALF	The Hogan Family	NBC Monday Night at the Movies			
NBC	Spring	My Two Dads	The Hogan Family	NBC Monday Night at the Movies			
NBC	Mid-spring	My Two Dads	**Working Girl**	Hunter (24/14.9) (Tied with CBS Sunday Movie)		**Shannon's Deal**	
NBC	Summer	ALF	The Hogan Family	NBC Monday Night at the Movies			
NBC	Mid-summer	**Sister Kate**	**Working Girl**	NBC Monday Night at the Movies			

== Tuesday ==
Network		8:00 p.m.	8:30 p.m.	9:00 p.m.	9:30 p.m.	10:00 p.m.	10:30 p.m.
ABC	Fall	Who's the Boss? (12/17.9)	The Wonder Years (8/19.2)	Roseanne (1/23.4) (Tied with The Cosby Show)	**Chicken Soup** (13/17.7) (Tied with Murder, She Wrote)	Thirtysomething	
ABC	Mid-fall	Who's the Boss? (12/17.9)	The Wonder Years (8/19.2)	Roseanne (1/23.4) (Tied with The Cosby Show)	Coach (18/17.0)	Thirtysomething	
ABC	Winter	Who's the Boss? (12/17.9)	The Wonder Years (8/19.2)	Roseanne (1/23.4) (Tied with The Cosby Show)	Coach (18/17.0)	Thirtysomething	
ABC	Spring	Who's the Boss? (12/17.9)	The Wonder Years (8/19.2)	Roseanne (1/23.4) (Tied with The Cosby Show)	Coach (18/17.0)	Thirtysomething	
ABC	Summer	Who's the Boss? (12/17.9)	The Wonder Years (8/19.2)	Roseanne (1/23.4) (Tied with The Cosby Show)	Coach (18/17.0)	Thirtysomething	
CBS	Fall	**Rescue 911**		**Wolf**		**Island Son**	
CBS	Winter	**Rescue 911**		CBS Tuesday Night Movie			
CBS	Spring	**Rescue 911**		CBS Tuesday Night Movie			
CBS	Summer	**Rescue 911**		CBS Tuesday Night Movie			
NBC	Fall	Matlock (20/16.6)		In the Heat of the Night (19/16.9)		Midnight Caller	
NBC	Winter	Matlock (20/16.6)		In the Heat of the Night (19/16.9)		Midnight Caller	
NBC	Spring	Matlock (20/16.6)		In the Heat of the Night (19/16.9)		Midnight Caller	
NBC	Summer	Matlock (20/16.6)		In the Heat of the Night (19/16.9)		**Real Life with Jane Pauley**	

== Wednesday ==
Network		8:00 p.m.	8:30 p.m.	9:00 p.m.	9:30 p.m.	10:00 p.m.	10:30 p.m.
ABC	Fall	Growing Pains (21/15.4)	Head of the Class (26/14.8)	**Doogie Howser, M.D.** (28/14.5) (Tied with **The Simpsons** and Night Court)	Anything but Love	China Beach	
ABC	Winter	Growing Pains (21/15.4)	Head of the Class (26/14.8)	**Doogie Howser, M.D.** (28/14.5) (Tied with **The Simpsons** and Night Court)	Anything but Love	China Beach	
ABC	Spring	Growing Pains (21/15.4)	Head of the Class (26/14.8)	**Doogie Howser, M.D.** (28/14.5) (Tied with **The Simpsons** and Night Court)	**The Marshall Chronicles**	**Equal Justice**	
ABC	Mid-spring	Growing Pains (21/15.4)	Head of the Class (26/14.8)	**Doogie Howser, M.D.** (28/14.5) (Tied with **The Simpsons** and Night Court)	**Brewster Place**	**Equal Justice**	
ABC	Summer	Growing Pains (21/15.4)	Head of the Class (26/14.8)	**Doogie Howser, M.D.** (28/14.5) (Tied with **The Simpsons** and Night Court)	Anything but Love	China Beach	
CBS	Fall	**Peaceable Kingdom**		Jake and the Fatman		Wiseguy	
CBS	Mid-fall	Beauty and the Beast		Jake and the Fatman		Wiseguy	
CBS	Winter	**Grand Slam**		Jake and the Fatman		Wiseguy	
CBS	Spring	**Normal Life**	**Sydney**	Jake and the Fatman		Wiseguy	
CBS	Mid-spring	**Sydney**	**Normal Life**	Jake and the Fatman		Special programming	
CBS	Summer	This Is America, Charlie Brown (R)	**Normal Life**	Jake and the Fatman		Special programming	
CBS	Mid-summer	Newhart (R)	**His & Hers**	Jake and the Fatman		**Top Cops**	
Fox (begins July 25th, 1990)	Mid-summer	**Glory Days**		**Molloy**	Various pilots	Local programming	
Fox (begins July 25th, 1990)	Late Summer	21 Jump Street (R)		**Molloy**	Various pilots	Local programming	
NBC	Fall	Unsolved Mysteries (11/18.0)		Night Court (28/14.5) (Tied with **The Simpsons** and **Doogie Howser, M.D.**)	**The Nutt House**	Quantum Leap	
NBC	Mid-fall	Unsolved Mysteries (11/18.0)		Night Court (28/14.5) (Tied with **The Simpsons** and **Doogie Howser, M.D.**)	My Two Dads	Quantum Leap	
NBC	Winter	Unsolved Mysteries (11/18.0)		Night Court (28/14.5) (Tied with **The Simpsons** and **Doogie Howser, M.D.**)	Dear John (17/17.2)	Quantum Leap	
NBC	Spring	Unsolved Mysteries (11/18.0)		Night Court (28/14.5) (Tied with **The Simpsons** and **Doogie Howser, M.D.**)	FM	Quantum Leap	
NBC	Late spring	Unsolved Mysteries (11/18.0)		Night Court (28/14.5) (Tied with **The Simpsons** and **Doogie Howser, M.D.**)	Dear John (17/17.2)	Quantum Leap	
NBC	Summer	Unsolved Mysteries (11/18.0)		**Singer & Sons**	Dear John (17/17.2)	Quantum Leap	
NBC	Mid-summer	Unsolved Mysteries (11/18.0)		Night Court (28/14.5) (Tied with **The Simpsons** and **Doogie Howser, M.D.**)	Dear John (17/17.2)	Quantum Leap	

Notes: Molloy aired at 9:00 p.m. on Fox from July 25 until August 15, 1990. Fox aired movies at 8:00 p.m. on an irregular basis.

== Thursday ==
Network		8:00 p.m.	8:30 p.m.	9:00 p.m.	9:30 p.m.	10:00 p.m.	10:30 p.m.
ABC	Fall	Mission: Impossible		**The Young Riders**		Primetime Live	
ABC	Winter	Father Dowling Mysteries		**The Young Riders**		Primetime Live	
ABC	Spring	Father Dowling Mysteries		**Twin Peaks**		Primetime Live	
ABC	Summer	Father Dowling Mysteries		**Twin Peaks**		Primetime Live	
CBS	Fall	48 Hours		**Top of the Hill**		Knots Landing	
CBS	Winter	48 Hours		**Island Son**		Knots Landing	
CBS	Spring	48 Hours		**Max Monroe: Loose Cannon**		Knots Landing	
CBS	Mid-spring	48 Hours		Falcon Crest		Knots Landing	
CBS	Summer	48 Hours		Wiseguy (R)		**Wolf**	
CBS	Mid-summer	48 Hours		**Northern Exposure**		The Eddie Capra Mysteries (R)	
Fox (begins August 23rd, 1990)	Late summer	**The Simpsons** (R)	Various programming	**Glory Days**		Local programming	
NBC	Fall	The Cosby Show (1/23.4) (Tied with Roseanne)	A Different World (4/21.1)	Cheers (3/22.7)	Dear John (17/17.2)	L.A. Law (16/17.4)	
NBC	Winter	The Cosby Show (1/23.4) (Tied with Roseanne)	A Different World (4/21.1)	Cheers (3/22.7)	**Grand** (15/17.6)	L.A. Law (16/17.4)	
NBC	Spring	The Cosby Show (1/23.4) (Tied with Roseanne)	A Different World (4/21.1)	Cheers (3/22.7)	**Wings**	L.A. Law (16/17.4)	
NBC	Summer	The Cosby Show (1/23.4) (Tied with Roseanne)	A Different World (4/21.1)	Cheers (3/22.7)	**Seinfeld**	L.A. Law (16/17.4)	
NBC	Mid-summer	The Cosby Show (1/23.4) (Tied with Roseanne)	A Different World (4/21.1)	Cheers (3/22.7)	**Grand** (15/17.6)	L.A. Law (16/17.4)	

Notes: The Eddie Capra Mysteries, which CBS aired from July 26 to August 30, consisted of reruns of episodes from the 1978-79 NBC series.

== Friday ==
Network		8:00 p.m.	8:30 p.m.	9:00 p.m.	9:30 p.m.	10:00 p.m.	10:30 p.m.
ABC	Fall	Full House (22/15.3) (Tied with Designing Women)	**Family Matters**	Perfect Strangers	Just the Ten of Us	20/20	
ABC	Winter	Full House (22/15.3) (Tied with Designing Women)	**Family Matters**	Perfect Strangers	Just the Ten of Us	20/20	
ABC	Spring	Full House (22/15.3) (Tied with Designing Women)	**Family Matters**	Perfect Strangers	Just the Ten of Us	20/20	
ABC	Summer	Full House (22/15.3) (Tied with Designing Women)	**Family Matters**	Perfect Strangers	**New Attitude**	20/20	
CBS	Fall	**Snoops**		Dallas		Falcon Crest	
CBS	Winter	**Max Monroe: Loose Cannon**		Dallas		Falcon Crest	
CBS	Mid-winter	**The Bradys**		Dallas		Falcon Crest	
CBS	Spring	Various programming		**Bagdad Cafe**	**Sugar and Spice**	Dallas	
CBS	Mid-spring	**Small Talk**	Various programming	**Bagdad Cafe**	**Sugar and Spice**	Dallas	
CBS	Summer	Special programming	**City**	CBS Friday Movie			
CBS	Mid-summer	**Snoops**		CBS Friday Movie			
CBS	Late summer	**Prime Time Pets**	Candid Camera	Newhart (R)	**Wish You Were Here**	**Room for Romance**	
NBC	Early fall	**Baywatch**		NBC Friday Night at the Movies			
NBC	Fall	**Baywatch**		**Hardball**		**Mancuso, F.B.I.**	
NBC	Winter	**Baywatch**		**True Blue**		**Mancuso, F.B.I.**	
NBC	Mid-winter	**Baywatch**		**Nasty Boys**		**Mancuso, F.B.I.**	
NBC	Spring	**Baywatch**		**Nasty Boys**		**Hardball**	
NBC	Mid-spring	**Mancuso, F.B.I.**		**Nasty Boys**		**Hardball**	
NBC	Late spring	**Baywatch**		**Nasty Boys**		**Hardball**	
NBC	Summer	Bret Maverick (R)		The Yellow Rose (R)		Midnight Caller (R)	
NBC	Mid-summer	Quantum Leap (R)		**Shannon's Deal** (R)		Midnight Caller (R)	
NBC	Late summer	Quantum Leap (R)		Night Court (R)	**Wings** (R)	Midnight Caller (R)	

Notes: Bret Maverick, which aired on NBC, consisted of reruns of the series' 1981–82 network run. The Yellow Rose, which also aired on NBC, consisted of reruns of the series' 1983–84 network run.

== Saturday ==
Network		8:00 p.m.	8:30 p.m.	9:00 p.m.	9:30 p.m.	10:00 p.m.	10:30 p.m.
ABC	Fall	Mr. Belvedere	**Living Dolls**	The ABC Saturday Mystery Movie			
ABC	Winter	Mission: Impossible		The ABC Saturday Mystery Movie			
ABC	Spring	**H.E.L.P.**		The ABC Saturday Mystery Movie			
ABC	Late spring	**Sunset Beat**		The ABC Saturday Mystery Movie			
ABC	Early summer	**Elvis**	Various programming	The ABC Saturday Mystery Movie			
ABC	Summer	**Super Jeopardy!**	**Monopoly**	The ABC Saturday Mystery Movie			
ABC	Late summer	**Super Jeopardy!**	**Monopoly**	China Beach (R)		**Twin Peaks** (R)	
CBS	Fall	Paradise		Tour of Duty		**Saturday Night with Connie Chung**	
CBS	Winter	Paradise		Tour of Duty		**Saturday Night with Connie Chung**	
CBS	Spring	Paradise		Tour of Duty		**Saturday Night with Connie Chung**	
CBS	Summer	Paradise		Beauty and the Beast		Tour of Duty	
Fox	Fall	COPS	The Reporters		Beyond Tomorrow	Local programming	
Fox	Winter	COPS	Totally Hidden Video	The Reporters		Local programming	
Fox	Spring	COPS	Totally Hidden Video	**In Living Color**	The Tracey Ullman Show	Local programming	
Fox	Summer	COPS	Totally Hidden Video	**Open House** (R)	The Tracey Ullman Show	Local programming	
Fox	Mid-summer	COPS	Totally Hidden Video	Married... with Children (R)	The Tracey Ullman Show	Local programming	
Fox	Late summer	Totally Hidden Video	Totally Hidden Video (R)	COPS	The Tracey Ullman Show	Local programming	
NBC	Fall	227	Amen	The Golden Girls (6/20.1)	Empty Nest (9/18.9)	Hunter (24/14.9) (Tied with CBS Sunday Movie)	
NBC	Winter	227	Amen	The Golden Girls (6/20.1)	Empty Nest (9/18.9)	Hunter (24/14.9) (Tied with CBS Sunday Movie)	
NBC	Spring	ALF	Amen	The Golden Girls (6/20.1)	Empty Nest (9/18.9)	Hunter (24/14.9) (Tied with CBS Sunday Movie)	
NBC	Mid-spring	**A Family for Joe**	13 East	The Golden Girls (6/20.1)	Empty Nest (9/18.9)	**Carol and Company**	**Down Home**
NBC	Late spring	13 East	Amen	The Golden Girls (6/20.1)	Empty Nest (9/18.9)	**Carol and Company**	**Down Home**
NBC	Summer	227	Amen	The Golden Girls (6/20.1)	Empty Nest (9/18.9)	Hunter (24/14.9) (Tied with CBS Sunday Movie)	
NBC	Mid-summer	Amen	13 East	The Golden Girls (6/20.1)	Empty Nest (9/18.9)	Hunter (24/14.9) (Tied with CBS Sunday Movie)	
NBC	Late summer	Amen	13 East	The Golden Girls (6/20.1)	Empty Nest (9/18.9)	**Carol and Company**	Various programming

Note: Comic Strip Live aired at 11:00 p.m.-12:00 a.m. on Fox.

== By network ==
=== ABC ===
Returning series

- 20/20
- The ABC Monday Night Movie
- ABC Mystery Movie (moved from Monday to Saturday)
- The ABC Sunday Night Movie
- Anything but Love
- China Beach
- Coach
- Father Dowling Mysteries (moved from NBC)
- Full House
- Growing Pains
- Head of the Class
- Just the Ten of Us
- MacGyver
- Mission: Impossible
- Mr. Belvedere
- Monday Night Football
- Perfect Strangers
- Roseanne
- Thirtysomething
- Who's the Boss?
- The Wonder Years

New series

- **America's Funniest Home Videos** *
- **Brewster Place** *
- **Capital News** *
- **Chicken Soup**
- **Doogie Howser, M.D.**
- **Elvis** *
- **Equal Justice** *
- **Family Matters**
- **Free Spirit**
- **H.E.L.P.** *
- **Homeroom**
- **Life Goes On**
- **Living Dolls**
- **The Marshall Chronicles** *
- **Monopoly** *
- **New Attitude** *
- **Primetime Live**
- **Sunset Beat** *
- **Super Jeopardy!** *
- **Tim Conway's Funny America** *
- **Twin Peaks** *
- **The Young Riders**

Not returning from 1988–89:

- ABC Saturday Night Movie
- Dynasty
- A Fine Romance
- Great Circuses of the World
- Have Faith
- HeartBeat
- Hooperman
- Incredible Sunday
- Knightwatch
- A Man Called Hawk
- Men
- Moonlighting
- Murphy's Law
- Police Story
- The Robert Guillaume Show
- Studio 5-B
- Thursday Night Baseball

=== CBS ===
Returning series

- 48 Hours
- 60 Minutes
- Beauty and the Beast
- CBS Sunday Movie
- Dallas
- Designing Women
- Doctor Doctor
- Falcon Crest
- Jake and the Fatman
- Knots Landing
- Murder, She Wrote
- Murphy Brown
- Newhart
- Paradise
- Tour of Duty
- Wiseguy

New series

- **Bagdad Cafe** *
- **The Bradys** *
- **City** *
- **The Dave Thomas Comedy Show** *
- **The Famous Teddy Z**
- **Grand Slam** *
- **His & Hers** *
- **Island Son**
- **Major Dad**
- **Max Monroe: Loose Cannon** *
- **Normal Life** *
- **Northern Exposure** *
- **A Peaceable Kingdom**
- **The People Next Door**
- **Prime Time Pets** *
- **Rescue 911**
- **Room for Romance** *
- **Saturday Night with Connie Chung**
- **Small Talk** *
- **Snoops**
- **Sugar and Spice** *
- **Sydney** *
- **Top Cops** *
- **Top of the Hill**
- **Wish You Were Here** *
- **Wolf**

Not returning from 1988–89:

- Almost Grown
- Annie McGuire
- The Cavanaughs
- CBS Summer Playhouse
- Coming of Age
- Dirty Dancing
- Dolphin Cove
- The Equalizer
- First Impressions
- Hard Time on Planet Earth
- Heartland
- High Risk
- Jesse Hawkes
- Kate & Allie
- Live! Dick Clark Presents
- Live-In
- Raising Miranda
- Simon & Simon
- The Smothers Brothers Comedy Hour
- TV 101
- The Van Dyke Show
- West 57th

=== Fox ===
Returning series

- 21 Jump Street
- America's Most Wanted
- Beyond Tomorrow
- Cops
- It's Garry Shandling's Show
- Married... with Children
- The Reporters
- Totally Hidden Video
- The Tracey Ullman Show

New series

- **Alien Nation**
- **Booker**
- **Comic Strip Live**
- **Glory Days** *
- **In Living Color** *
- **Molloy** *
- **Open House**
- **The Outsiders** *
- **The Simpsons** *

Not returning from 1988–89:

- Duet

=== NBC ===
Returning series

- 13 East
- 227
- ALF
- Amen
- Cheers
- The Cosby Show
- Dear John
- A Different World
- Empty Nest
- The Golden Girls
- The Hogan Family
- Hunter
- In the Heat of the Night
- L.A. Law
- The Magical World of Disney
- Matlock
- Midnight Caller
- My Two Dads +
- NBC Sunday Night Movie
- NBC Monday Night at the Movies
- Night Court
- Quantum Leap
- Unsolved Mysteries

New series

- **Ann Jillian** *
- **Baywatch**
- **Brand New Life**
- **Carol & Company** *
- **Down Home** *
- **A Family for Joe** *
- **FM**
- **Grand** *
- **Hardball**
- **Mancuso, F.B.I.**
- **Nasty Boys** *
- **The Nutt House**
- **Real Life with Jane Pauley** *
- **Seinfeld** *
- **Shannon's Deal** *
- **Singer & Sons** *
- **Sister Kate**
- **True Blue** *
- **Wings** *
- **Working Girl** *

Not returning from 1988–89:

- Baby Boom
- Day by Day
- Dream Street
- Family Ties
- Father Dowling Mysteries (moved to ABC)
- Highway to Heaven
- The Jim Henson Hour
- Knight & Daye
- Miami Vice
- Nearly Departed
- Nightingales
- One of the Boys
- Something Is Out There
- Sonny Spoon
- Tattingers/Nick & Hillary
- Unsub

Note: The * indicates that the program was introduced in midseason.

+ These shows returned as "backup" programming in midseason
