= WPPB =

WPPB may refer to:

- WBEC-TV, a television station (digital channel 25/virtual channel 63) licensed to Boca Raton, Florida, which held the call sign WPPB-TV from 1986 to 2008
- WLIW-FM, a radio station (88.3 FM) licensed to Southampton, New York, which held the call sign WPPB from 2010 to 2020
- WPVD (AM), a radio station (1290 AM) licensed to Providence, Rhode Island, which held the call sign WPPB in 2020
