= WETV (Florida) =

Television station in Key West, Florida (1989–1990)

- Key West, Florida; United States
- Channels: Analog: 13 (VHF)

Programming
- Affiliations: Trinity Broadcasting Network

Ownership
- Owner: Palmetto Broadcasters Associated for Communities

History
- First air date: July 1, 1989
- Last air date: November 30, 1990

Technical information
- Facility ID: 51344
- ERP: 316 kW
- HAAT: 142 m (465 ft)
- Transmitter coordinates: 24°40′35″N 81°30′41″W

WETV (channel 13) was a television station in Key West, Florida, United States, which broadcast from 1989 to 1990. It was owned by Palmetto Broadcasters Associated for Communities, associated with Palm Beach Atlantic College, and aired programming from the Trinity Broadcasting Network in its short time on air. WETV's existence was cut short when an act of Congress ordered the channel's reservation for TV Martí, the new United States government television service for Cuba, and the government paid the owner to surrender the license.

== History ==
On February 3, 1986, the Federal Communications Commission (FCC) granted a 1985 application from Florida Educational Television of Monroe County to construct a new non-commercial educational television station on channel 13 at Key West. The new construction permit took the callsign WETV; in 1987, the permittee name changed to Palmetto Broadcasters Associated for Communities, and it was consolidated with other educational TV permittees associated with Palm Beach Atlantic College. This brought the unbuilt WETV under an ambitious umbrella; in 1989, PBAC would announce its plans for WPPB-TV (channel 63) in Boca Raton, planned as a station targeting senior citizens, and WTCE-TV (channel 21) in Fort Pierce, alongside a station on channel 9 in Islamorada that would be known as "Hispanivision" (and was never built).

WETV signed on either on July 1, 1989, or in September, broadcasting from its tower on Cudjoe Key.

=== TV Martí ===
In 1988, a task force—consisting of the United States Information Agency (USIA), Voice of America, National Telecommunications and Information Administration, the Department of Defense, and the FCC—was convened to select a VHF channel for transmission of television programming to Cuba, as there were virtually no UHF receivers in place in the country at the time. The task force concluded that only channel 13 was available for this purpose, as the other eleven VHF channels would cause excessive interference. On February 16, 1990, President George H. W. Bush signed the Television Broadcasting to Cuba Act, a component of the Foreign Relations Authorization Act for fiscal years 1990 and 1991, into law. This act of Congress barred any reassignment of TV channels that would affect domestic service when those stations had been on air on January 1, 1989—not the case for WETV, which had signed on (at the earliest) July 1 and could have its channel, the only one identified by the 1988 task force as suitable for the purpose, reassigned for government use.

In late March 1990, test broadcasts began for TV Martí from government facilities on the Keys: a balloon tethered above Cudjoe Key. Three weeks later, on April 13, PBAC entered into an asset purchase agreement with Jacksonville Educational Broadcasters, a noncommercial subsidiary of the Trinity Broadcasting Network (TBN), by which Jacksonville Educational (the licensee of WJEB-TV Jacksonville) would acquire two PBAC stations, WETV and WTCE-TV; WETV was to be sold for $542,500. WETV had only broadcast one program since signing on the air: Praise the Lord, the flagship TBN program. However, as TV Martí was approved for full-time operations and with the law authorizing WETV and TV Martí to share time on the channel (by way of Martí leasing it from WETV) only through November 30, the FCC moved in October to dismiss the application to sell the station, saying it would not be in the national interest to authorize the sale when the channel was weeks away from being reclaimed under the provisions of the Television Broadcasting to Cuba Act, which afforded no discretion to the commission. The USIA paid $1.3 million to Palmetto to induce it to surrender the FCC license.
