= Top of the Hill (TV series) =

American political drama television series

- Genre: Political drama
- Written by: Stephen J. Cannell; Morgan Gendel; Art Monterastelli
- Directed by: Bill Corcoran; Peter Ellis; Alan Metzger; Mario Van Peebles; Brad Silberling
- Starring: William Katt; Jordan Baker; Tony Edwards; Dick O'Neill; Robbie Weaver
- Composer: Mike Post
- Country of origin: United States
- Original language: English
- No. of seasons: 1
- No. of episodes: 13 (3 unaired)

Production
- Executive producer: Stephen J. Cannell
- Producers: Henry Colman; Mark Lisson; Jo Swerling, Jr.
- Running time: 60 minutes (approx)

Original release
- Network: CBS
- Release: September 21 – November 30, 1989

Top of the Hill is an American political drama television series aired by CBS from September 21 to November 30, 1989 as part of its 1989 fall lineup.

== Synopsis ==
Top of the Hill starred William Katt as U.S. Representative Thomas Bell, Jr., son of a long-time Congressman who had been forced to resign his seat due to health issues but who remained on "The Hill" to help his son in an advisory role, which sometimes led to conflicts. Bell, Jr., had, despite his father's position, never followed politics closely or ardently prior to being chosen as his father's successor, which was sometimes a liability but also gave him the ability to look at issues, even long-running ones, through a fresh set of eyes. Young Bell also had a hard time fitting into the political party structure as he desired to do what his conscience told him would be the best thing for the country and the voters in his district. In the less than three months that the program ran, the Congressman became involved in some fairly contentious issues, including adoptee rights, labor union corruption, pollution, and military procurement.

Top of the Hill failed to find a large enough audience to last more than a season; the show had to compete with the Top 10 hit Cheers and the Top 20 hit Dear John, both on NBC in the same time slot.

== Cast ==
- William Katt as Thomas Bell, Jr.
- Jordan Baker as Susan Pengilly
- Tony Edwards as Link Winslow
- Dick O'Neill as Thomas "Pat" Bell, Sr.
- Robbie Weaver as Mickey Stewart

== Episodes ==
No.	Title	Directed by	Written by	Original release date
1	"Top of the Hill"	Alan Metzger	Stephen J. Cannell	September 21, 1989
2	"You Were Always on My Mind"	Bill Corcoran	Jack Bernstein	September 28, 1989
3	"The Noble Roman"	Unknown	Unknown	October 5, 1989
4	"At Risk"	Helaine Head	Art Monterastelli	October 12, 1989
5	"Taking the Heat"	David Jackson	Art Monterastelli	October 26, 1989
6	"Not in My Backyard"	James A. Contner	Mark Lisson	November 2, 1989
7	"Running Shoes"	Unknown	Unknown	November 9, 1989
8	"Above Suspicion"	Bill Corcoran	Bob Cochran	November 16, 1989
9	"Accurate But Not True"	Unknown	David Levinson	November 30, 1989
10	"Letter from a Dead Man"	Unknown	James Grady	December 7, 1989
11	"A House Divided"	David Jackson	Sharon Elizabeth Doyle	Unaired
12	"Always Faithful"	TBD	TBD	Unaired
13	"Without a Trace"	TBD	TBD	Unaired
