= Silent Cries =

- Genre: Drama; War
- Based on: Guests of the Emperor by Janice Young Brooks
- Teleplay by: Walter Halsey Davis; Vickie Patik
- Directed by: Anthony Page
- Starring: Gena Rowlands; Annabeth Gish; Chloe Webb
- Music by: Billy Goldenberg
- Country of origin: United Kingdom; United States
- Original language: English

Production
- Producers: Paul Pompian; Carol Williams
- Production location: Thibodaux, Louisiana
- Cinematography: Mike Fash
- Editor: Janet Bartels-Vandagriff
- Running time: 98 minutes
- Production companies: Diane Sokolow Productions; TriStar Television; Yorkshire Television

Original release
- Network: NBC
- Release: March 8, 1993

Silent Cries is a 1993 television film adaptation, directed by Anthony Page, of Guests of the Emperor by Janice Young Brooks.

== Plot ==
This film is a dramatization of the Japanese occupation of Singapore, specifically the imprisonment of a large group of American, European and Australian women and children. As news of Japan's imminent invasion are shared across the area, many flee to the airport in hopes of escaping. As a large crowd witnesses an aircraft land, their hopes are soon shattered when the aircraft turns, exposing a Japanese flag on the fuselage. Soldiers pour out of the aircraft and begin their takeover of the airport. Among the women are Hazel Hampton and her mother, Roberta. Hazel flees to the nearby restroom in hopes of secluding some jewelry and encounters a woman named Dr. Margaret (Peggy) Sutherland in one of the stalls, shredding the pages of her passport. Soldiers soon enter and usher them out.

Men are separated from the women and children and are taken away on trucks to prison camps. The film follows a specific group of women and children as their confinement begins. During processing, Peggy is identified by another woman online, but refuses to acknowledge she is who the woman claims, instead claiming her name is Peggy Wright. Hazel remembers seeing her in the airport restroom and immediately walks forward to Peggy, pretending to know her and to brush off the other woman. It is soon found that Peggy is well-known author who has written literature highly critical of the Japanese empire, and fears her identity being disclosed in fear of retaliation.

Other women are introduced to the story as they are faced with incredibly difficult living conditions, forced labor and scarce food supply, compounded by a maniacal camp leader, Saigo. Camp commandant Natsumi appears more level-headed but rarely interjects when Saigo's extreme measures are exercised.

After some time in the initial camp, the women are forced on a lengthy train and foot journey to a new camp, with several women losing their lives to illness and injury along the way. The newer camp is in worse condition, and with Saigo's temperament continuing to deteriorate, the prisoners' day to day life becomes even more difficult.

Rumors begin to spread of America's invasion and pushback of Japanese forces. Within a short time, a low-passing aircraft overflies the camp, raining down papers which Peggy reads aloud to the camp: the war is concluding and the Japanese have surrendered. Saigo, enraged at this, gunbuts Peggy to the ground and has his soldiers round up the other prisoners along a wall to be shot. As the soldiers take aim, Natsumi fires a pistol in the air to stop them. He admonishes Saigo severely, reminding him he was ordered not to harm the prisoners. He is quickly dismissed and the women quickly run to Peggy, who has succumbed to her injuries. Hazel meets with Natsumi to ensure her name is properly documented as Dr. Margaret Sutherland when accounting for her. Natsumi recognizes the name and how it was wise of her to conceal her true identity. Natsumi recognizes and expresses shame at Saigo's treatment of the prisoners, and expresses his remorse for the loss of Peggy's life. Allied soldiers soon enter the prison, liberating the survivors.

== Cast ==
- Gena Rowlands as Peggy Sutherland
- Annabeth Gish as Hazel Hampton
- Chloe Webb as Dinki Denk
- Gail Strickland as Roberta Hampton
- Phyllis Logan as Nancy Muir
- Judy Parfitt as Beryl Stacton
- Cherie Lunghi as Audrey St John
- Clyde Kusatsu as Saburo Saigo
- Kim Braden as Mrs. Webber
- Pamela Brull as Jane Kowolski
- Stan Egi as Spike
- Nick Tate as Harry Nown
- Sab Shimono as Natsume
- Sylvia Short as Dr. Millichope
- Natsuko Ohama as Nurse Royama
- Camille James Harman (as Camille Meaux) as Mrs. Halliburton
- Yuji Okumoto as Mickey (uncredited)
