= WKPX =

Coordinates: 26.178°N 80.256°W

- Sunrise, Florida; United States
- Broadcast area: Miami-Ft. Lauderdale-Hollywood
- Frequency: 88.5 MHz
- Branding: WKPX; Radio X, "WNSU"

Programming
- Format: Educational

Ownership
- Owner: Broward County Public Schools
- Operator: Nova Southeastern University (during off-hours)
- Sister stations: WBEC-TV

History
- First air date: February 14, 1983

Technical information
- Licensing authority: FCC
- Facility ID: 66342
- Class: A
- ERP: 3,000 watts
- HAAT: 30 meters (98 ft)

Links
- Public license information: Public file; LMS

WKPX (88.5 FM) is the non-commercial, educational radio station owned and operated by the Broward County Public Schools (BCPS), broadcasting at 3,000 watts and reaching all of Broward County. In mid-2020, production studios were relocated from Piper High School, where the station had operated for many years, to BECON's production facility in Davie. This move is a first step in a plan to create internship opportunities for students throughout BCPS to get training and practical experience in radio as well as television and video production.

Through an agreement between BECON and Nova Southeastern University (NSU), the evening hours on WKPX (6:00pm to midnight) are dedicated to Radio X, and music programs hosted by NSU media students.

== History ==
WKPX was conceived by its Chief Engineer, Warren Exmore, who earned his U.S. Federal Communications Commission (FCC) Engineering license while still a teenager. He served as an electronics and computer instructor at Piper High School. Its first Program Director and broadcasting instructor was Sheldon Shores. Exmore and Shores, working with former Piper principal Robert Beale and an annual budget of a $120,000, launched the station on Valentine's Day 1983. Upon the departure of co-founder Shores in the summer of 1985, Bill Foreman joined the station as its operations manager and its high school program Broadcasting Instructor.

The station began by broadcasting top 40 and classic rock formats on a 24-hour schedule from 1983 to 1985. However, staffing a 24-hour operation with high school aged students (in the days before computer automation) proved to be difficult, and presented risk management issues to the school board. In 1985, WKPX transitioned to operating 12 hours daily, from 7 a.m. to 7 p.m.

Broadcasting giant CBS planned to complete its purchase of WCIX (channel 6) on January 1, 1989. It was the contention of CBS that WKPX's 3,000-watt signal on 88.5 was too close to Channel 6 on the FM band at 87.7, and the radio signal would interfere with the already weak television signal in Broward. As result, WKPX was not able to become a fully licensed facility. In late September 1991, the FCC granted a permanent license to WKPX.

In February 1993, the station celebrated its 10th anniversary.

On September 4, 1998, Nova Southeastern University's student run radio station, WNSU, went on from 7 p.m. to 3 a.m. through the transmitter of 88.5 FM WKPX, while Piper High School continued to use the frequency from 7 a.m. to 7 p.m., daily. The eight-year-old WNSU went on the air in August 1990 as a closed circuit/campus radio station, known as WNKR (Nova Knights Radio; after the athletics teams/program) on 101.1 FM. The station broadcast over the 101.1 frequency via radio splitters provided by Jones Intercable Systems in Davie, Florida. The agreement to allow WNSU to use the WKPX transmitter at night was about five years in the making, since 1993, with FCC, NSU and school board attorneys writing a contract that worked for all parties, assuring educational benefits to both Piper High School and Nova Southeastern University.

According to a July 2005 Sun-Sentinel report, WKPX filed complaints with the FDLE and the FCC regarding two pirate radio stations at 89.5 and 88.7 FM interfering with WKPX's signal since May. According to rwonline.com, the State of Florida had passed an "Anti-Pirate Radio Law," in July 2004 making it illegal to operate unlicensed radio station in the state.

In June 2009, all 971 full-powered TV stations in the U.S. were switched to digital. Upon the FCC instituting DTV (digital television), and the abandonment of analog broadcasting, this led to the abandonment the local Channel 6 by NBC-owned WTVJ. As result, the FM frequency which broadcast the audio for Channel 6, 87.7 FM, was cleared; WKPX applied to the FCC for a facility change (power increase) for 88.5 FM. At that time, as reported by the radio industry paper allaccess.com, the request was denied. By November 2009, WKPX's request to increase its power to 25 kW (25,000 watts), was granted by the FCC.

February 14, 2013, marked the station's 30th anniversary as "South Florida's Radio Alternative"."

== Shows ==
Between 1996 and 2006, the station was recognized for its highly popular weekend hip-hop programs which included: Sichop and, later, The Asylum, hosted by Sydney Crawford, Curtis Steele, and Gerald Dagher. From Nova University DJ Peloquin did a show called The Rocklein from 2001-2003 which played Metal and Punk Rock. More recently, there were variety shows hosted by the Music Directors of each corresponding year: from 2001 to 2010 - Noise Pollution (Punk Variety), 2008 to 2009 - Special Delivery, and 2008 to 2010 - Dead Air. Other popular shows from the high school-based programming schedule included the weekday, all request, program The Power Lunch, hosted by Brett Rose in the early 1990s, Ground Zero, a 1980s Retro/New Wave program hosted by the then high school program's News Director, Jason Specland. Serena Milisci conceived the show Current Impulse, in the early 1990s; a dance music program that aired Tuesdays from 3 to 5 p.m. when school was in session; and from 1 to 4 p.m. during the summer and holidays. The upbeat dance tunes aired for two years on Current Impulse proved popular enough with the listeners, that the show continued with new, up and coming DJs from the high school program.

In 1987, Helaine Blum, an English teacher with Piper High School, became the new broadcasting instructor and program director for WKPX.

Around the time she and Chief Engineer Warren Exmore developed a night school Adult Education Radio Broadcast Journalism course for Piper Community School, Helaine Blum flipped WKPX's then Top 40-leaning format to the Alternative Rock format, with WKPX's sound analogous to a college rock radio station.

The format flip was inspired by such "alternative bands" as the Cure, Jane's Addiction, Alice in Chains, and Love and Rockets gaining airplay on the then glam-rock leaning AOR radio stations in the United States, such as the local, dominate rocker in South Florida, WSHE 103.5 FM. Also contributing to the format flip was the growing alternative music scene and the popularity of unsigned local bands in the South Florida area, which began to gain interest from major-label record companies.

It was Blum's Adult Educational program that supplied the station with a series of popular disc jockeys during the station's heyday as an alternative rock station, between 1987 and 1997, with the long-running Yvonne Ortiz and her show "Beauty of the Beat," Genie White with her retrospective punk and new wave program, "Saturday Rewind," along with RDB and Keith McIntosh and their respective underground indie/college rock programs "Over the Edge" and "The Uncommon Groove."

WKPX's successful alumni airstaff from their high school and adult educational programs includes Linda Energy of WPLJ in New York City and Miami's WBGG-FM, Tony The Tiger of Miami's WPOW and WTHM. Steven Robertson, who works in Atlantic Records' A&R department, along with Gregg Stewart and Todd Allen, both currently on the air locally at WMXJ 102.7 FM "The Beach."

== See also ==
- Campus radio
- List of college radio stations in the United States
