= Off the Rack =

- Genre: Sitcom
- Created by: Richard Baer; Bob Randall; Dan Guntzelman; Steve Marshall
- Written by: Dan Guntzelman; Steve Marshall; Bob Randall; Lissa Levin; Timothy James; Larry Balmagia
- Directed by: Jay Sandrich (pilot); Noam Pitlik (series)
- Starring: Edward Asner; Eileen Brennan; Pamela Brull; Dennis Haysbert; Sandy Simpson; Claudia Wells; R. J. Williams; Cory Yothers
- Theme music composer: Fred Karlin
- Composer: Fred Karlin
- Country of origin: United States
- Original language: English
- No. of seasons: 1
- No. of episodes: 6 (+1 Pilot Special)

Production
- Executive producers: Marc Merson; Dan Guntzelman; Steve Marshall
- Production location: ABC Television Center
- Camera setup: Multi-camera
- Running time: 30 minutes (with commercials)
- Production companies: Brownstone and Mugwump Productions; Warner Bros. Television

Original release
- Network: ABC
- Release: December 7, 1984 – April 19, 1985

Off the Rack is an American sitcom television series set in the Los Angeles garment industry that aired on ABC from March 15 until April 19, 1985. The series stars Ed Asner and Eileen Brennan and was originally directed by Noam Pitlik. Its taping location was the ABC Television Center in Hollywood.

It was canceled after six regular episodes and one half-hour pilot, which aired as a special on December 7, 1984 (in which the locale was originally New York; the network insisted the setting be changed to Los Angeles for the series). Off the Rack premiered as a regular series in the middle of the 1984–1985 television season as a mid-season replacement on ABC on the same day as Mr. Belvedere. Writer Lissa Levin and director Noam Pitlik would go on to work for that series, following Off the Rack's cancellation.

== Cast ==
- Ed Asner as Sam Waltman
- Eileen Brennan as Kate Halloran
- Pamela Brull as Brenda Patagorski
- William Brian Curran as J.P. (pilot)
- Dennis Haysbert as Cletus Maxwell
- Sandy Simpson as Skip Wagner
- Claudia Wells as Shannon Halloran
- Cory Yothers as Timothy Halloran (6 episodes)
- R.J. Williams as Timothy Halloran (pilot)

== Episodes ==
| No. | Title | Directed by | Written by | Original release date | Prod. code |
|---|---|---|---|---|---|
| TBA | "Pilot" | Jay Sandrich | Story by : Bob Randall & Dan Guntzelman & Steve Marshall; Teleplay by : Dan Guntzelman & Steve Marshall | December 7, 1984 | 100 |
| 1 | "Partners" | Noam Pitlik | Dan Guntzelman & Steve Marshall | March 15, 1985 | 102 |
| 2 | "A Date with Kate" | Noam Pitlik | Dan Guntzelman & Steve Marshall | March 22, 1985 | 101 |
| 3 | "Here Comes the Bribe" | Unknown | Dan Guntzelman & Steve Marshall | March 29, 1985 | 104 |
| 4 | "Who Do You Trust?" | Noam Pitlik | Story by : Steve Marshall & Dan Guntzelman; Teleplay by : Lissa Levin | April 5, 1985 | 103 |
| 5 | "The Letter" | Unknown | Timothy James | April 12, 1985 | 105 |
| 6 | "Immigration Man" | Unknown | Larry Balmagia | April 19, 1985 | 106 |
