= Pamela Brull =

American actress

- Other name: Pam Brull
- Occupation: Actress
- Years active: 1976–1997
- Known for: The Secret Empire; Days of Our Lives; Molloy

Pamela Brull, sometimes credited as Pam Brull, is an American actress.

== Career ==
=== Television ===
Brull played the stepmother of the title character (played by Mayim Bialik) and the mother of two others (one of whom was played by a young Jennifer Aniston) in the short-lived sitcom Molloy. Brull was featured in the pilot of the sitcom Seinfeld (1989).

=== Theatre ===
Brull starred on Broadway (1990) in the original production of Rupert Holmes' Accomplice as the character 'Harley'. She also performed the role at the Pasadena Playhouse where the play made its debut (1989).

Brull is a member of the Los Angeles based theatre company, INTERACT.

== Filmography ==
Year	Title	Role	Notes
1979	The Secret Empire	Maya	Series Regular, 10 episodes
1980	Angie	Laurie	1 episode
1980	Tenspeed and Brown Shoe	Michelle	1 episode
1981	Three's Company	April	1 episode
1982	Knots Landing	Miss Wink	1 episode
1982	Falcon Crest	Brenda	1 episode
1983	Good-bye, Cruel World	Alice	Feature Film
1982-1983	T. J. Hooker	Sherry	3 episodes
1984	Matt Houston	Rachel Durbinstratch	1 episode
1984	The Philadelphia Experiment	Doris	Feature Film
1984	Scarecrow and Mrs. King	Peggy Marlowe	1 episode
1984-1985	Off the Rack	Brenda Patagorski	Series Regular, 7 episodes
1985	Hunter	Bonnie Taylor	1 episode
1985	The Love Boat	Linda Hershel	1 episode
1988	CBS Summer Playhouse	Marcy Mansfield	1 episode
1988	Just the Ten of Us	Dr. Costanza	1 episode
1988	Days of Our Lives	Ellen Hawk	TV series
1989	Off Duty		Pilot
1987-1989	Growing Pains	Thelma	6 episodes
1989	Seinfeld	Laura	Pilot, 1 episode
1990	Molloy	Lynn Martin	Series Regular, 8 episodes
1990	The Guardian	Gail Krasno	Feature Film
1991	They Came From Outer Space	Nurse Crockett	1 episode
1991	True Colors	Mrs. Fairchild	1 episode
1991	Matlock	Amanda Dobbs	1 episode
1993	Home Free	Susan	1 episode
1993	Silent Cries	Jane Kowolski	T.V. movie
1993	Saved by the Bell: The New Class	Gwen Barrett	1 episode
1995	Stuart Saves His Family		Feature Film
1995	The Home Court	Candee	1 episode
1996	The Bachelor's Baby		T.V. Movie
1996	The Pretender	Kitty Morgan	1 episode
