= Molloy (TV series) =

- Genre: Sitcom
- Created by: George Beckerman
- Developed by: Stu Kreisman; Chris Cluess
- Starring: Mayim Bialik; Kevin Scannell; Pamela Brull; Jennifer Aniston; Luke Edwards; I.M. Hobson; Ashley Maw; Bumper Robinson
- Opening theme: "Ac-Cent-Tchu-Ate the Positive" performed by Dr. John
- Composer: Ed Alton
- Country of origin: United States
- Original language: English
- No. of seasons: 1
- No. of episodes: 7 (3 unaired)

Production
- Producer: Lee Rich
- Running time: 30 minutes
- Production companies: The Lee Rich Company; Warner Bros. Television

Original release
- Network: Fox
- Release: July 25 – August 15, 1990

Molloy is an American sitcom television series that aired on Fox from July 25, 1990, until August 15, 1990. It starred Mayim Bialik as a carefree New York-native preteen girl, whose life is turned upside down when her mother dies and her divorced father moves her to Los Angeles to live with his new wife and step-children. The series was created by George Beckerman, and executive produced by Lee Rich. Chris Cluess and Stu Kreisman were also executive producers.

== Synopsis ==
Molloy Martin (Bialik) is a happy-go-lucky 11-year-old who is reasonably well-adjusted to a household of divorce, living with her single mother in New York, while amiable father Paul (Kevin Scannell) has remarried and is living in Los Angeles. Molloy is used to seeing her father fly in on weekends for visitation rights and thinks she knows him all too well until she finds her world turned upside down. Her mother suddenly dies, and Molloy has no choice but to relocate and move in with Paul and his family. Molloy is excited about the new location, but not necessarily about having a new, extended family. She is wary of Paul's second wife of three years, Lynn Walker (Pamela Brull), a vivacious, savvy mother who is too hip for the machinations of her children, self-absorbed teen Courtney (Jennifer Aniston, in her first TV role) and young Jason (Luke Edwards). Molloy views them as all largely disrupting her life and previous freedom as an only child. Finally living under the same roof as her father, she discovers differences and conflicts with him that she never knew existed. In zany, comical fashion, Molloy cooks up schemes and goes to great lengths to break up the family, but ultimately finds that despite her qualms, there is a lot of love to be discovered and shared within the new family.

Much of Molloy's displeasure in her new world originates from snobbish Courtney, who can't be bothered with another precocious little sibling, and from day one is constantly at odds with Molloy. Paul and Lynn mediate when called for, and at times, Jason serves as an ally to Molloy in her competition with Courtney (mostly he keeps to himself, inside the ever-present headphone set he wears at the kitchen table). A silver lining to the new arrangement is Paul's new job as program director and producer at local KQET-TV. He oversees the production of Wonderland, a children's variety show, in which Molloy earns a regular part. Her co-stars on Wonderland are a mixed group of child and adult actors, including portly veteran performer Simon (I.M. Hobson), who appears in character as a squirrel, ditsy teenager Sara (Ashley Maw), and hip Louis Duncan Jackson (Bumper Robinson), who fancies himself with the special moniker "D'Uncann" and feels he is ready to hit primetime.

== Cast ==
- Mayim Bialik as Molloy Martin
- Kevin Scannell as Paul Martin
- Pamela Brull as Lynn Walker Martin
- Jennifer Aniston as Courtney Walker
- Luke Edwards as Jason Walker
- I.M. Hobson as Simon
- Ashley Maw as Sara
- Bumper Robinson as Louis Duncan Jackson

== Development ==
Having built a budding career in TV and films since the age of nine, Bialik was vigorously sought as a TV series lead after her widely praised performance in the movie Beaches (1988), where she played Bette Midler's lead character in childhood flashbacks. During the 1989-90 TV season, Bialik committed to two pilots; that of Molloy and for NBC, Blossom, from Witt/Thomas Productions and creator Don Reo. The two projects were in vast competition with each other, as both vied to be a successful starring vehicle for the young actress. Molloy went into production first, with a seven-episode order commissioned by Fox for the summer of 1990. After these seven were completed, Bialik then shot the original pilot for Blossom, which NBC was going to air as a comedy special that summer as well. On July 5, 1990, two weeks before Fox's premiere of Molloy, NBC aired the Blossom special to high ratings. With both projects riding on each other's misfortune for survival, it was up to the Fox series to do well—which it didn't. After lackluster ratings in its tryout run, Fox canceled Molloy with three unaired episodes. The cancellation of Molloy then allowed NBC the option to put Blossom into production as a regular series, where it ran for 5 seasons.

Molloy has never been syndicated. It is also the debut TV appearance for Jennifer Aniston, who would go on to appear in the NBC sitcom Friends.

== Theme song ==
The series' theme was a cover of "Ac-Cent-Tchu-Ate the Positive", performed in an upbeat jazz style by Dr. John. After the seven episodes of Molloy were produced, John was then hired to perform the theme for Bialik's other proposed project, Blossom. John went on to have a lasting association with the young actress, as Blossom ran for five seasons on NBC (1991–1995).

== Episodes ==
No.	Title	Directed by	Written by	Original release date	Viewers (millions)
1	"Pilot/Surprise, We Forgot""	Andrew D. Weyman	Stu Kreisman & Chris Cluess	July 25, 1990	3.4
2	"Blame It on Mio"	Jack Shea	Dottie Archibald	August 1, 1990	2.4
3	"Hell No, We Won't Mop 'n Glo"	Andrew D. Weyman	Carrie Honigblum & Renee Phillips	August 8, 1990	3.1
4	"The Object of Her Obsession"	Andrew D. Weyman	Dottie Archibald	August 15, 1990	3.2
5	"The Day the Squirrel Cried"	N/A	N/A	Unaired	N/A
6	"Business as Usual"	N/A	N/A	Unaired	N/A
