= WTCE-TV =

Television station in Fort Pierce, Florida

- Fort Pierce–West Palm Beach, Florida; United States
- City: Fort Pierce, Florida
- Channels: Digital: 18 (UHF); Virtual: 21

Programming
- Affiliations: 21.1: TBN; for others, see § Subchannels

Ownership
- Owner: Community Educational Television; (Trinity Broadcasting Network); (Jacksonville Educators Broadcasting, Inc.)

History
- First air date: May 9, 1990
- Former call signs: WTCE (1990–2005)
- Former channel numbers: Analog: 21 (UHF, 1990–2007); Digital: 38 (UHF, 2007–2019)
- Call sign meaning: Treasure Coast Educational Television

Technical information
- Licensing authority: FCC
- Facility ID: 29715
- ERP: 730 kW
- HAAT: 297 m (974 ft)
- Transmitter coordinates: 27°1′32″N 80°10′41.9″W

Links
- Public license information: Public file; LMS

WTCE-TV (channel 21) is a religious television station licensed to Fort Pierce, Florida, United States, serving the West Palm Beach area. It is owned by the Trinity Broadcasting Network through its Community Educational Television subsidiary, which manages stations in Florida and Texas on channels allocated for non-commercial educational broadcasting. WTCE-TV broadcasts from a transmitter in unincorporated southeastern Martin County (southwest of Hobe Sound).

While it has broadcast TBN programming for its entire history since signing on in May 1990, WTCE was not originally intended to be a Christian television station. The construction permit was obtained in 1986 by a group which sought to start a public television station for Fort Pierce. Unable to raise federal grant money to build the station, it sold the permit to an affiliate of Palm Beach Atlantic College (PBAC) at the end of 1987. PBAC intended to build WTCE as the first in a series of new non-commercial stations across South Florida. However, despite coming weeks away from launch and announcing programming, a financial crunch left PBAC without the cash to begin broadcasting. TBN had provided the equipment used to start the station, so PBAC sold the station to TBN despite an earlier agreement with the owner of Miami public TV station WPBT.

== Pre-launch history ==
=== Construction permit award ===
Even though channel 21 in Fort Pierce was allocated for use by a non-commercial educational television station, the only user of the channel by 1985 was a translator for WTOG in St. Petersburg, which began broadcasting the commercial independent station to St. Lucie County and the northern part of Martin County in May 1983. This changed in 1985, when Florida Educational Television applied for channel 21. It proposed to provide PBS service to an area that mostly needed cable to watch public television stations. A construction permit was issued by the Federal Communications Commission (FCC) in January 1986, Florida Educational Television estimated that it would need $2 million, primarily from a federal grant, to build its proposed WFET by 1988. Meanwhile, the WTOG-TV translator was shut down by the station at the end of October 1986 to make way for the new educational channel and because its programming duplicated other independent stations available in the Fort Pierce area. Florida Educational Television also held the construction permit for WETV, channel 13 in Key West, and applied for channel 29 in Ocala.

Florida Educational Television was never able to pursue the federal grant money it needed to build WFET. In December 1987, Palmetto Broadcasters Associated for Communities, Inc., purchased the construction permit for $76,500. It won an extension of the construction permit. However, it was not until October 1989 that Palmetto—an affiliate of Palm Beach Atlantic College, a private Christian institution in West Palm Beach—revealed its ambitious and extensive television plans. In addition to WETV, it proposed funding and operating three stations through Palmetto Broadcasters: WPPB in Boca Raton, with programming for senior citizens; WKEB "Hispanavision", to broadcast from Islamorada with bilingual programming; and a renamed channel 21 with new WTCE call letters. Channel 21 promised to fill a void in the Fort Pierce area; two months prior, commercial station WTVX had discontinued its local newscasts after it lost its CBS affiliation, leaving the Treasure Coast without local TV news coverage. However, existing public TV broadcasters in South Florida met Palmetto's announcement with a chilly reception. The Florida state administrator for public broadcasting noted that 99 percent of Floridians already received PBS programming, and in order to receive state funds, WTCE would have to show its signal did not duplicate an existing station. Other officials connected with WXEL-TV in Boynton Beach and WPBT in Miami, both PBS members, also expressed skepticism over the need for additional public stations and Palmetto's ability to finance their high startup costs.

The station was intended to start on December 1, but this was pushed back to January 7, 1990; it planned to broadcast from facilities in Port St. Lucie, and proposed programs included educational shows and local features on business and agriculture. As December 1989 drew to a close, Palmetto pushed the start of WTCE back further to February 4, 1990. It also announced a slate of 14 local programs it hoped to introduce covering education, local business, exercise, and other topics.

=== A Florida freeze and a change in plans ===
Palmetto, however, failed to gather the financial resources necessary to start the mostly-completed television station. In mid-January 1990, Palmetto laid off the five-person staff of WTCE indefinitely. While freeze damage to the transmitter was cited officially as the reason for the delay, newspaper reporting pointed to financial causes, and the acting station manager noted that the layoff announcement did not sound temporary. The Corporation for Public Broadcasting had no records of Palmetto filing for grant monies. At that time, discussions with WPBT's parent, the Community Television Foundation of South Florida, were ongoing. That month, the Community Television Foundation filed for a federal grant to fund the purchase of WTCE, telling the National Telecommunications and Information Administration that it had concluded an agreement to acquire channel 21. This met with opposition from WXEL-TV, which in mid-March intimated that it could challenge any deal filed at the FCC. For WXEL-TV, the combination of WPBT and WTCE would have placed the eight-year-old public station between two signals from its largest competitor for viewers and members.

However, Palmetto blindsided the Community Television Foundation in late March when it told the public broadcaster that it had concluded a sale agreement with an affiliate of the Trinity Broadcasting Network (TBN), discarding a sheet of terms that the foundation and Palmetto had signed in January. It emerged that, unbeknownst to Community Television Foundation, TBN owned much of the equipment that was being used to build WTCE. Because of this, in order to settle the debt with TBN, Palmetto was forced to sell the station to the religious broadcaster. WETV had gone on air the previous year airing TBN programming. The failure to launch the station was attributed by one of its former employees to an inability to secure a sound business plan.

== TBN operation ==
WTCE began broadcasting in May 1990 with three hours of programming a day from TBN. Within a week, an application was filed to sell the station to Jacksonville Educational Broadcasters, of which TBN founder Paul Crouch was president, for $630,000, with Palmetto retaining airtime in the morning to broadcast programs of local interest. The sale also included an attempt to sell WETV to Jacksonville Educational Broadcasters. However, WETV was forced off the air and the sale turned down by the FCC because an act of Congress had forced the designation of channel 13 at Key West for use to transmit TV Martí to Cuba.

In 1995, WTCE moved into the studios formerly occupied by WTVX when that station's operations were merged with ABC affiliate WPBF at its studios in Palm Beach Gardens. After the 2019 repeal of the main studio rule, requiring full-service TV stations like WTCE-TV to maintain facilities in or near their communities of license, TBN closed 27 studio facilities and put them for sale. TBN president Matt Crouch estimated that the move would save the network $20 million a year.

== Subchannels ==
The station's signal is multiplexed:

Subchannels of WTCE-TV
Subchannel	Res.	Short name	Programming
21.1	720p	TBN HD	TBN
21.2	720p	inspire	TBN Inspire
21.3	480i	Enlace	TBN Enlace USA

TBN-owned full-power stations permanently ceased analog transmissions on April 16, 2009.
