= Cruise of Deception =

Days of Our Lives storyline

The Cruise of Deception was a major cliffhanger and resolution storyline on the daytime drama Days of Our Lives. Billed as a "miniseries" by NBC advertisements, it aired from June 7 until July 16, 1990.

The story included several of the show's most popular characters attending a masked ball on a cruise ship, which is taken over by a vengeful Ernesto Toscano, played by Charles Cioffi. The miniseries acted as the climax of several stories that had been developing previously to it, and the launching pad of several more, some of which played out through most of the 1990s. The weeks-long storyline was a special production, requiring "long weekend shoots, water tanks, and tilting scenery."

Among the characters impacted were Bo and Hope, a popular couple. Hope died at the end of the storyline, allowing actress Kristian Alfonso to exit the show. Alfonso was nine months pregnant at the time. Roman's romance the next year with Isabella was considered an example of the storyline's ongoing impact.

A storyline of this magnitude had not been developed for the series before this time, and even today it is remembered as one of the most ballyhooed ratings events in the show's history. In 2005, SOAPnet named the Cruise of Deception one of the 40 most memorable moments in Days history.

== Development ==
The show prospered from the Cruise of Deception. In late 1989, its ratings were in a freefall and its popularity was on the wane. Former executive producer Al Rabin, who had helmed Days of our Lives during the popular mid-1980s period, was lured out of retirement to restructure the show. He, along with then-head writers Anne M. Schoettle and Richard J. Allen, concocted the Cruise of Deception.

The show even changed its opening credits for the first time in its history to correspond to the storyline. At the half-way point of the famous hourglass opening, the shot faded to that of a dark, ominous-looking ocean, and the words "Cruise of Deception" scrolled into place as "Days of Our Lives" appeared in smaller lettering below it. An announcer intoned, "The story continues on 'Cruise of Deception.'"

One of the memorable elements of the story was the red dress worn by Julie Williams (Susan Seaforth Hayes), which was noticeably unseaworthy when the character abandoned ship. Julie and Victor were dressed as Kate and Petruchio from The Taming of the Shrew, with Julie wearing an elaborate evening gown. A Soap Opera Digest columnist wrote, "The dress got wetter and wetter and tighter and tighter and Julie, her hair damp, looked positively bedraggled... Shipwrecked and stranded, Julie didn't need a life jacket. That red dress saved her — and the cruise." Upon reaching the island, Julie's dress slowly disintegrated as the weeks went on. Hayes said, "I loved the fact that crew members took pieces of my dress and had it hanging on their cameras. It was like being in a war movie!" Costume designer Richard Blore said, "The infamous red dress. I think that is going to haunt us... I have never had so much story or reference in magazines about that red dress."

NBC promoted the story heavily to lure kids home from school to watch the show during their summer vacation. Ratings rose due to the storyline, but then the ratings retreated, something that would not markedly change for at least the next three years.

== Plot summary ==
The story took place aboard the Loretta, an ocean liner commandeered by vengeful Ernesto, and Ernesto's island located somewhere in the Mediterranean Sea. His main purpose in putting together the cruise was to exact revenge on all of his supposed enemies at once. Invited on the cruise were Isabella Toscano (Staci Greason), John Black (believed to be Roman Brady) (Drake Hogestyn), Bo Brady (Peter Reckell), Hope Brady (Kristian Alfonso), Jack Deveraux (Matthew Ashford), Jennifer Horton (Melissa Brennan Reeves), Julie Williams (Susan Seaforth Hayes), and Ernesto's #1 enemy Victor Kiriakis (John Aniston). Ernesto used his love of magic tricks to deceive and terrorize his passengers.

Several key events that transpired during the cruise and subsequent trek to Ernesto's island included: the performance of Ernesto's play "Fatal Passion," in which Victor nearly murdered Roman/John; Jack and Jennifer revealing that Isabella was really Victor's daughter, not Ernesto's, after an affair with Ernesto's wife; Roman/John and Isabella realizing they are in love with each other; Ernesto planting a bomb on board the Loretta; everyone washing ashore on his island; Jack and Jennifer, the show's "supercouple" at the time, making love for the first time; Ernesto slowly poisoning Isabella for accidentally murdering her half-sister Marina earlier in the series; Victor and Julie's first kiss; and Bo double-crossing Ernesto, which in turn led to the shocking climactic ending to the storyline: Hope and Ernesto's supposed deaths during one of Ernesto's "magic tricks" in an explosion while inside a cage suspended over a vat of acid.

Following their rescue from Ernesto's island, the shipwrecked characters return to the show's hometown of Salem, USA to cope with Hope's "death" and move on with their lives following the life-changing events of the story. Eventually, actress Kristian Alfonso returned to the show four years later, and it was revealed that Hope was in fact switched at the last moment before the explosion with an imposter, Greta von Amberg. Ernesto's fate was never revealed.

== Story Chapters ==
Based on the NBC promos that were broadcast during the storyline, the Cruise of Deception was divided into the following chapters:

- Days 1-3: The Lady Vanishes
- Days 4-5: A Dance of Death
- Days 6-8: A Shot Is Fired
- Days 9-10: A Warning Is Issued
- Days 11-12: The Secret's Out
- Day 13: Overboard
- Days 14-18: A Magic Moment
- Days 19-21: A Daring Rescue
- Days 22-30: A Deal With The Devil
