= Island Son =

American medical drama TV series (1989–90)

- Genre: Medical drama
- Created by: Martin Rabbett; Judith Paige Mitchell; Lane Slate
- Starring: Richard Chamberlain; William McNamara; Brynn Thayer
- Theme music composer: Paul De Mello; Bruce Broughton (replacement)
- Composer: Dennis McCarthy
- Country of origin: United States
- Original language: English
- No. of seasons: 1
- No. of episodes: 18

Production
- Executive producers: Richard Chamberlain; Carol Evan McKeand; Nigel McKeand
- Running time: 60 minutes
- Production companies: Maili Point Productions; Lorimar Television

Original release
- Network: CBS
- Release: September 19, 1989 – March 15, 1990

Island Son is an American medical drama television series that aired on CBS from September 16, 1989 to March 15, 1990, during the 1989–90 schedule.

Island Son marked the return of Richard Chamberlain to a regular TV series since his Dr. Kildare series almost 25 years earlier. In the interim, he had enjoyed a successful career in feature films and TV miniseries and had become widely known as "The King of the Miniseries" due to his popularity in the latter.

== Premise ==
Chamberlain once again portrayed a dedicated medical doctor, Dr. Daniel Kulani. Kulani was born in Hawaii and practiced on the mainland for many years prior to his return to work at the fictional Kamehameha Medical Center in Honolulu. Kulani's complicated life involved his stressful work environment; his adoptive parents, Tutu and Nana; his 18-year-old son, Sam; and his love interest, high school drama teacher Nina Delaney. Dr. Kulani's complicated life had not been resolved to the satisfaction of viewers when the series was cancelled.

== Cast ==
- Richard Chamberlain as Dr. Daniel Kulani
- Brynn Thayer as Dr. Margaret Judd
- Clyde Kusatsu as Dr. Kenji Fushida
- Carol Huston as Dr. Caitlin McGrath
- Timothy Carhart as Dr. Anthony Metzger
- Betty Carvalho as Nana Kulani
- William McNamara as Sam

== Episodes ==
No.	Title	Original release date
1	"Heart and Soul"	September 19, 1989
2	"Fathers and Sons"	September 24, 1989
3	"Sometimes They're Zebras"	September 26, 1989
4	"Gifts"	October 3, 1989
5	"Painkillers"	October 10, 1989
6	"Life Sentences"	October 24, 1989
7	"The State vs. John Kulani"	October 31, 1989
8	"Role Models"	November 7, 1989
9	"Everyday People"	November 14, 1989
10	"Hihia"	December 14, 1989
11	"The Christmas Story"	December 21, 1989
12	"Falling Stars"	January 4, 1990
13	"Icarus Falling"	January 11, 1990
14	"Mary, Mary Quite Contrary"	February 1, 1990
15	"Janine Returns"	February 8, 1990
16	"Viruses"	February 15, 1990
17	"Moving Targets"	February 22, 1990
18	"Separations"	March 15, 1990
