= Grand Slam (TV series) =

- Genre: Action
- Created by: Bill L. Norton
- Starring: John Schneider; Paul Rodriguez
- Composer: Joseph Conlan
- Country of origin: United States
- Original language: English
- No. of seasons: 1
- No. of episodes: 8 (2 unaired)

Production
- Executive producers: Herb Jaffe; Mort Engelberg
- Running time: 60 minutes
- Production companies: Bill Norton Productions; New World Television

Original release
- Network: CBS
- Release: January 28 – March 14, 1990

Grand Slam is an American action drama television series that aired from January 28 to March 14, 1990. The series premiered after Super Bowl XXIV on CBS, but never found an audience and was cancelled after six episodes leaving two unaired.

== Premise ==
The series was about two bounty hunters in San Diego.

== Cast ==
- John Schneider as Dennis "Hardball" Bakelenoff
- Paul Rodriguez as Pedro N. Gomez
- Larry Gelman as Irv Schlosser
- Abel Franco as Al Ramirez
- Lupe Ontiveros as Grandma Gomez

== Episodes ==
No.	Title	Written by	Original release date
1	"Pilot"	Unknown	January 28, 1990
Hardball and Gomez decide to work together in order to find the same drug smuggler.
2	"Chop Shop"	Unknown	January 31, 1990
A thief turns up dead after stealing Gomez's car.
3	"Dog Days"	Unknown	February 7, 1990
Hardball and Gomez open up a detective agency and their first assignment is to find a woman's dog.
4	"My Favorite Sociopath"	Unknown	February 14, 1990
Hardball and Gomez persuade a woman to help them catch a loan shark.
5	"He Works Hard for the Money"	Unknown	March 7, 1990
Gomez helps an old girlfriend prove that her husband is innocent.
6	"Byte the Bullet"	Unknown	March 14, 1990
The team catch a computer hacker who is on the run from Neo-Nazis.
7	"Arana"	N/A	Unaired
8	"Who's Crazy"	Dan DiStefano & Steve Hayes	Unaired

== See also ==
- List of Super Bowl lead-out programs
