= Tim Conway's Funny America =

- Promotional still for Tim Conway's Funny America broadcast in April 1990.
- Genre: Comedy reality television
- Starring: Tim Conway
- Country of origin: United States
- Original language: English
- No. of seasons: 1
- No. of episodes: 7

Production
- Running time: 30 minutes

Original release
- Network: ABC
- Release: April 29 – September 2, 1990

Tim Conway's Funny America is a 1990 American television comedy starring Tim Conway. Its first episode aired as a special on April 29, 1990, and it was then broadcast as a weekly series from July 29, 1990, to September 2, 1990.

== Production ==
Seeking a compatible series to insert in its Sunday evening lineup after its hit America's Funniest Home Videos show, ABC aired Tim Conway's Funny America in the summer of 1990. Starring Tim Conway, Tim Conway's Funny America borrowed heavily from the format of the long-running Candid Camera show, with Conway traveling around the United States in various disguises and playing practical jokes on unsuspecting people while hidden cameras filmed their reactions. Among the show's gags were Conway pretending to be an old man crossing a street, an eccentric employee of a pet-grooming salon, a member of the "fashion police" in a motorcycle policeman's uniform ticketing passersby on the street for their attire, a clumsy teppanyaki chef in a Japanese restaurant, and an aerobics class leader – the latter in the guise of his character "Dorf," a dark-haired man with a normal-sized head, body, and arms, but extremely short legs and an odd foreign accent. Conway presented the resulting videos to a studio audience.

Despite his success as a member of the cast of the situation comedy McHale's Navy from 1962 to 1966 and in two theatrical films spun off from the series, McHale's Navy in 1964 and McHale's Navy Joins the Air Force in 1965, as well as his popularity during several years as a regular on The Carol Burnett Show in the 1970s, Tim Conway had found no success in starring in a television show of his own. His situation comedies Rango in 1967, The Tim Conway Show in 1970, and Ace Crawford, Private Eye in 1983 had all been cancelled after short runs, as had two comedy-variety series, The Tim Conway Comedy Hour in the fall of 1970 and The Tim Conway Show in 1980–1981. Conway had no better luck with Tim Conway's Funny America, which was cancelled after only a few weeks on the air. A total of seven episodes aired, including a special on April 29, 1990, and six weekly episodes broadcast between July 29 and September 2, 1990.

Tim Conway's Funny America aired at 8:30 p.m. Eastern Time on Sunday throughout its brief run.
