= His & Hers (1990 TV series) =

1990 American sitcom TV series

- Created by: Patricia Jones; Donald Reiker
- Starring: Martin Mull; Stephanie Faracy; Lisa Picotte; Blake Soper; Richard Kline
- Composer: Howard Pearl
- Country of origin: United States
- Original language: English
- No. of seasons: 1
- No. of episodes: 13

Production
- Camera setup: Multi-camera
- Running time: 30 minutes
- Production companies: Ubu Productions; Paramount Television

Original release
- Network: CBS
- Release: March 5 – August 22, 1990

His & Hers is an American sitcom that aired on CBS from March 5, 1990 to August 22, 1990.

== Premise ==
Two married marriage counselors with kids from a former union.

== Cast ==
- Martin Mull as Doug Lambert
- Stephanie Faracy as Reggie Hewitt
- Blake Soper as Noah Lambert
- Lisa Picotte as Mandy Lambert
- Blair Tefkin as Debbie
- Richard Kline as Jeff Spector

== Episodes ==
No.	Title	Directed by	Written by	Original release date
1	"Pilot"	Terry Hughes	Patricia Jones and Donald Reiker	March 5, 1990
Reggie and Doug find out that they have fertility problems.
2	"Mirror, Mirror on the Couch"	Unknown	Unknown	March 12, 1990
Reggie and Doug counsels a couple that have the same relationship as they have.
3	"M is for the Many Things She Lifted"	Unknown	Unknown	March 19, 1990
Doug has to deal with his kleptomaniac mother.
4	"'Til Death Do Them Part"	Unknown	Unknown	March 26, 1990
A wife kills her husband based on advice from Reggie and Doug.
5	"The One That Got Away"	Unknown	Unknown	April 9, 1990
Reggie and Doug gets a visit from the parents of the baby they want to adopt.
6	"Dueling Therapists"	Unknown	Unknown	April 16, 1990
Doug and Reggie fight over members of a therapy group.
7	"Anchor's Way"	Unknown	Unknown	April 23, 1990
Reggie and Doug need a vacation, but a therapy group won't let them leave.
8	"Fear of Marriage"	Unknown	Unknown	July 2, 1990
The couple recall how they met on the softball field.
9	"Just Plain Bill"	Unknown	Unknown	July 9, 1990
Doug's parents announce that they are getting back together after 40 years of separation.
10	"My Boyfriend's Back and There's Gonna Be Trouble"	Unknown	Unknown	August 1, 1990
A new patient of Doug admits that he's still in love with Reggie.
11	"The Slump"	Unknown	Unknown	August 8, 1990
Reggie hires two married actors to help with the business.
12	"Psycho Radio"	Unknown	Unknown	August 15, 1990
Reggie and Doug gets criticism for their academic approach to a call-in radio show.
13	"Forever Mentor"	Unknown	Unknown	August 22, 1990
Doug and Reggie gets a visit from their former mentors.
