= Max Monroe: Loose Cannon =

- Genre: Crime drama
- Created by: Dean Hargrove; Joel Steiger
- Starring: Shadoe Stevens; Bruce A. Young; Arnetia Walker; David Schramm
- Country of origin: United States
- Original language: English
- No. of seasons: 1
- No. of episodes: 8

Production
- Executive producers: Dean Hargrove; Fred Silverman
- Running time: 60 minutes
- Production companies: The Fred Silverman Company; Dean Hargrove Productions; Viacom Productions

Original release
- Network: CBS
- Release: January 5 – April 19, 1990

Max Monroe: Loose Cannon is an American television drama series. It ran one season.

Created by Dean Hargrove and Joel Steiger, it ran on the CBS Television Network from January 5, 1990 to April 19, 1990. The show centered around a Los Angeles Police Department detective with unconventional methods, who always manages to "get his man". The theme song was performed by Yello.

== Cast of characters ==
- Shadoe Stevens as Detective Max Monroe
- Bruce A. Young as Detective Charlie Evers
- David Schramm as Captain Farraday
- Arnetia Walker as Loretta Evers

== Episodes ==
No.	Title	Directed by	Written by	Original release date
1	"Legacy"	Unknown	Unknown	January 5, 1990
2	"Ransom"	John Nicolella	Story by : Stephen Katz; Teleplay by : Chris Hayward & Stephen Katz	January 12, 1990
3	"Voices"	James A. Contner	Story by : Brian Clemens & Phil Mishkin; Teleplay by : Phil Mishkin	January 19, 1990
4	"Freaks"	Christopher Hibler	Story by : Brian Clemens & Ted Mann; Teleplay by : William Conway	January 26, 1990
5	"Tricks"	Dan Attias	Brian Clemens	April 5, 1990
6	"Flashback"	Christopher Hibler	Story by : Dean Hargrove & Joel Steiger; Teleplay by : Dean Hargrove	April 12, 1990
7	"Flashback"	Christopher Hibler	Story by : Dean Hargrove & Joel Steiger; Teleplay by : Dean Hargrove	April 12, 1990
8	"Felonious Monk"	Christopher Hibler	Story by : Brian Clemens & William Conway; Teleplay by : William Conway	April 19, 1990

== Sources ==
- Terrace, Vincent. "Max Monroe" in Encyclopedia of Television Shows, 1925 through 2007. Jefferson, North Carolina: McFarland & Co., 2008.
