= Monopoly (game show) =

- Genre: Game Show
- Created by: Merv Griffin
- Based on: Monopoly
- Written by: Sharon Safianoff-Jones
- Directed by: Kevin McCarthy
- Presented by: Mike Reilly
- Starring: Kathy Davis; Kathy Karges; Michelle Nicholas
- Announcer: Charlie O'Donnell
- Country of origin: United States
- No. of episodes: 12 (+1 pilot)

Production
- Producer: Burt Wheeler
- Production locations: Hollywood Center Studios; Hollywood, California
- Running time: 22 minutes
- Production companies: Merv Griffin Enterprises; King World

Original release
- Network: ABC
- Release: June 16 – September 1, 1990

Monopoly is an American television game show based on the board game of the same name. The format was created by Merv Griffin and produced by his production company, Merv Griffin Enterprises.

Monopoly aired as a summer replacement series on ABC along with Super Jeopardy!, a special tournament edition of Griffin's quiz show. Monopoly premiered on June 16, 1990, and aired following Super Jeopardy! for twelve consecutive Saturday nights until September 1, 1990.

Former Jeopardy! contestant Mike Reilly was chosen to host the series, with Charlie O'Donnell as announcer. Three separate women, Kathy Davis, Kathy Karges, and Michelle Nicholas, served as the co-host/dice roller.

== Gameplay ==
=== First round ===
Three contestants played, each represented by a color (red, gold, and green).

Contestants attempted to take control of the eight groups of colored properties on a giant Monopoly board. To do so, they had to solve crossword-style clues. The first letter of each answer was given to the contestants, and each side of the four-sided board, referred to as "blocks" (with the block containing the five properties between the Go to Jail corner and "GO" referred to as the "high rent district"), had a different starting letter for clues. Each clue was a toss-up, and answering correctly won money equal to the value of the property, from $60 for Mediterranean Avenue to $400 for Boardwalk. Answering incorrectly deducted that value from a contestant's score. In the event that all three contestants failed to answer a clue, the property value was cut in half and another clue was read.

Each color group, referred to as a monopoly, had to be controlled by one of the contestants before play moved on to another. Once a contestant controlled a monopoly, the total monetary value of its properties was added to his/her score. Monopoly values ranged from $120 (for Mediterranean and Baltic Avenues) to $920 (for Pacific, North Carolina, and Pennsylvania Avenues).,

If the properties in a monopoly ended up under the control of multiple contestants, a series of toss-up clues were played between them to determine ownership. A contestant who owned two properties in a group of three had to give one correct answer in order to take full control, while the contestant who owned the third had to give two. If all three contestants each owned one property, the first to give a correct answer challenged one opponent and took over the property of the other, and the remainder of the showdown followed the two-contestant format. An incorrect answer on the initial toss-up forfeited that contestant's property, which was then awarded to one of the others through a second toss-up. In the case of the Mediterranean/Baltic and Park Place/Boardwalk monopolies being split between two contestants, the first to answer a clue correctly took control.

=== Big Money Round ===
During the commercial break following the completion of the first round, the contestants used the money they had earned to build houses and hotels on their properties. These cost $50 and $250 respectively, regardless of the properties' position on the board, and contestants had to build evenly within a color group. The number of houses/hotels on a property determined the amount of its rent, which was used as the value of its clues.

Once the contestants' construction purchases had been revealed and the corresponding cost deducted from their scores, the Big Money Round began. An indicator light started at "GO" and moved clockwise around the board, according to the total of two oversized dice rolled by the show's hostess. Every contestant received a $200 bonus whenever the indicator light passed or landed on "GO."

If a property was landed on, O'Donnell called out its rent value and Reilly read a clue to the contestant who owned it. A correct response added the rent value to his/her score. A miss incurred no penalty but allowed either of the opponents to buzz in under the same rules as the first round, with an incorrect answer deducting from that contestant's score.

Squares other than properties affected the gameplay as follows:

- Utilities (Electric Company and Water Works): a tossup clue was asked, worth $100 times the total on the dice.
- Railroads: if the indicator light landed on one of the four railroads, contestants got the chance to "ride" the particular railroad to a monopoly and initiate a "hostile takeover". A tossup was asked, and the first contestant to answer the clue correctly chose one of his/her opponents' monopolies to take over. The indicator light then moved to the first property in the chosen monopoly, and the contestant trying to take it over had to answer a series of clues unopposed, one for each property. Every correct answer advanced the indicator light to the next property in line. If the contestant answered all the clues correctly, he/she won control of the monopoly; its combined value was added to his/her score, and any houses or hotels built on it became his/her property. A wrong answer ended the takeover attempt and the contestant had to pay the corresponding rent to the owner of the monopoly, based on where the indicator was when the wrong answer was given.
- Chance and Community Chest: a card was drawn from the appropriate deck and its instructions (bonuses, fines, movement) were followed.
- Tax Spaces: landing on Income Tax deducted 10% from every contestant's score, while Luxury Tax deducted $75.
- Free Parking: a tossup was asked and the first contestant to answer correctly won $500, plus all money collected in taxes/fines since the last correct Free Parking response.
- Go To Jail: if the indicator landed on this space, it moved to the "In Jail" space and each contestant lost $250.

The second round was played until time was called. At this point, all houses and hotels were sold back to the bank at their original purchase price and the money was credited to the contestants who owned the properties, regardless of who had originally built them. The contestant with the highest total won the game, kept his/her money, and advanced to the bonus round.

=== Bonus Round ("Once Around the Board") ===
The champion tried to complete one full clockwise circuit of the board within five rolls while staying out of jail. The contestant first chose four spaces – one each on the maroon/orange and red/yellow sides, and two on the green/blue side – to become Go to Jail spaces. The original Go to Jail space remained on the board, for a total of five Go to Jail spaces.

The champion started at "GO" and rolled the dice to move around the board. The contestant could quit and take $100 per space passed after each successful roll. Rolling doubles awarded an extra roll. The champion won $25,000 for passing "GO" without running out of rolls, or $50,000 for landing on "GO" exactly. If the champion landed on a Go to Jail space at any time, the round ended and he/she forfeited the money. The contestant won $100 for each space passed if all rolls were exhausted and the contestant failed to pass "GO" without landing on a "Go to Jail" space.

== Production information ==
Merv Griffin created the series and served as executive producer. Monopoly was paired with Super Jeopardy! for its 12-week run on ABC.

Host Mike Reilly competed on the television game show Jeopardy! in 1989. Reilly later worked as a waiter before being selected a year later by producer Merv Griffin to perform as a contestant on the pilot for Monopoly. After the pilot with Peter Tomarken as host was taped, Reilly was selected as host. The pilot was produced for syndication, but could not gain clearances. Tomarken clashed with producers over production elements, which included Patty Maloney dressed in the Mr. Monopoly character.

== See also ==
- Monopoly Millionaires' Club - a game show from 2015 also based on Monopoly
- Family Game Night - a game show that aired from 2010 to 2014 that included Monopoly-themed games
