= Bagdad Cafe (TV series) =

1990 American television series

- Genre: Sitcom
- Based on: Bagdad Cafe by Percy Adlon
- Developed by: Mort Lachman; Sy Rosen
- Directed by: Paul Bogart
- Starring: Whoopi Goldberg; Jean Stapleton
- Country of origin: United States
- Original language: English
- No. of seasons: 2
- No. of episodes: 15

Production
- Executive producers: Zev Braun; Mort Lachman; Thad Mumford; Sy Rosen
- Producer: Michael Mount
- Running time: 23 minutes
- Production companies: Mort Lachman and Associates; Zev Braun Pictures; New World Television; CBS Entertainment Productions

Original release
- Network: CBS
- Release: March 30, 1990 – July 27, 1991

Bagdad Cafe is an American television sitcom starring Whoopi Goldberg and Jean Stapleton that aired on CBS. The series premiered March 30, 1990, and ran two seasons before being cancelled in winter 1990. The last two episodes aired in July 1991. The show is based on the 1987 Percy Adlon film Bagdad Cafe.

== Cast ==
- Whoopi Goldberg as Brenda
- Jean Stapleton as Jasmine
- James Gammon as Rudy
- Monica Calhoun as Debbie
- Scott Lawrence as Juney
- Cleavon Little as Sal

In this version, Jasmine was not German.

== Production ==
The series was shot in the conventional sitcom format, in front of a studio audience. The show did not obtain a sizable audience, being forced to compete with ABC's Top 20 hit Family Matters and was cancelled after two seasons.

Insiders say that production of the series ended on November 16, 1990, after a dispute between Goldberg and the show's co-executive producer, Thad Mumford. Executive producer Kenneth Kaufman was told that Goldberg called CBS president Jeff Sagansky in late November to say that she was quitting the show. With no time to recast Goldberg's role, CBS ended the series and pulled the remaining episodes from the broadcast schedule.

== Episodes ==
=== Series overview ===
Season	Episodes	Originally released	
Season	Episodes	First released	Last released
1	6	March 30, 1990	May 11, 1990
2	9	September 28, 1990	July 27, 1991

Fifteen episodes were produced, and are registered with the United States Copyright Office.

=== Season 1 (1990) ===
No. overall	No. in season	Title	Directed by	Written by	Original release date	Prod. code	US viewers (millions)
1	1	"Pilot"	Paul Bogart	Mort Lachman & Sy Rosen	March 30, 1990	101	24.0
2	2	"When You're Hot, You're Hot"	Unknown	Unknown	April 6, 1990	103	18.3
3	3	"You Say It's Your Birthday"	Unknown	Unknown	April 13, 1990	102	16.3
4	4	"Too Many Cooks"	Unknown	Unknown	April 27, 1990	106	12.8
5	5	"Breakdown"	Unknown	Unknown	May 4, 1990	105	15.1
6	6	"Art"	Unknown	Unknown	May 11, 1990	104	15.4

=== Season 2 (1990–91) ===
No. overall	No. in season	Title	Directed by	Written by	Original release date	Prod. code	US viewers (millions)
7	1	"This Bird Has Flown"	Unknown	Unknown	September 28, 1990	204	12.7
8	2	"Not Enough Cooks"	Unknown	Unknown	October 5, 1990	201	13.9
9	3	"City on a Hill"	Unknown	Unknown	October 26, 1990	202	11.7
10	4	"Sixteen Candles"	Unknown	Unknown	November 2, 1990	205	12.7
11	5	"I Got a Crush on You"	Unknown	Unknown	November 9, 1990	206	13.1
12	6	"Rainy Days and Mondays"	Paul Bogart	Vicki S. Horwitz	November 16, 1990	207	10.9
13	7	"Hell Hath No Fury"	Unknown	Unknown	November 23, 1990	203	9.7
14	8	"Over My Dead Body"	Unknown	Unknown	July 27, 1991	208	7.5
15	9	"Prisoner of Love"	Paul Bogart	Victor Fresco	July 27, 1991	209	8.6

== Reception ==
Ken Tucker of Entertainment Weekly rated the series a C, saying that "rarely has a bad sitcom been better acted". Despite being impressed with the acting from Stapleton and Little, Tucker was disappointed that the producers did not hire better writers, to match the quality of the movie on which the series is based. Howard Rosenberg of the Los Angeles Times said the show's premiere "doesn't click tonight, it yields no laughs". However, John J. O'Connor of The New York Times remarks that "the stars seem to be enjoying themselves immensely", and compliments the director of the pilot noting, "Paul Bogart, a sitcom miracle worker, directs the first episode with enough aplomb to qualify himself as a master illusionist".
