= Down Home (TV series) =

American sitcom television series

- Genre: Sitcom
- Created by: Barton Dean
- Starring: Judith Ivey; Ray Baker
- Composer: Stewart Levin
- Country of origin: United States
- Original language: English
- No. of seasons: 2
- No. of episodes: 19

Production
- Running time: 30 minutes
- Production companies: Savage Cake Productions; Jabberwocky Productions; Paramount Television

Original release
- Network: NBC
- Release: April 12, 1990 – May 18, 1991

Down Home is an American sitcom television series created by Barton Dean, that aired on NBC from April 12, 1990, to May 18, 1991. Ted Danson served as series co-producer.

== Premise ==
New York City executive Kate McCrorey returned to visit her home town of Hadley Cove, Texas, a Gulf Coast fishing village, only to end up staying there to try to save her father Walt's bait and tackle shop from condominium developer Wade Prescott, Kate's ex-boyfriend.

== Cast ==
- Judith Ivey as Kate McCrorey
- Ray Baker as Wade Prescott
- Eric Allan Kramer as Drew McCrorey
- Dakin Matthews as Walt McCrorey
- Timothy Scott as Grover
- Gedde Watanabe as Tran

== Episodes ==
=== Season 1 (1990) ===
No. overall	No. in season	Title	Directed by	Written by	Original release date
1	1	"Pier Pressure"	Unknown	Unknown	April 12, 1990
2	2	"It's Never Too Late to Break Your Neck"	Lee Shallat	Barton Dean	April 14, 1990
3	3	"Missed Popularity"	Unknown	Unknown	April 21, 1990
4	4	"This Bug's for You"	Unknown	Bill Braunstein & Sydney Blake	April 28, 1990
5	5	"By the Book"	James Burrows	Barton Dean	May 5, 1990
6	6	"Sometimes a Cigar's Just a Cigar or Wade"	Lee Shallat	Richard Day	May 12, 1990

=== Season 2 (1991) ===
No. overall	No. in season	Title	Directed by	Written by	Original release date
7	1	"Mail Order Train"	Unknown	Unknown	February 28, 1991
8	2	"This Has Been a Wade Political Announcement"	Unknown	Unknown	March 2, 1991
9	3	"Strange Bedfellows"	Lee Shallat	Richard Day	March 9, 1991
10	4	"Whatsamatta Drew"	Unknown	Unknown	March 16, 1991
11	5	"I'm Cooking as Fast as I Can"	Unknown	Unknown	March 23, 1991
12	6	"Don't Rock the Boat"	Unknown	Unknown	March 30, 1991
13	7	"The Good Fight"	Unknown	Unknown	April 6, 1991
14	8	"You're Not Getting Older, You're Getting Deader"	Unknown	Unknown	April 13, 1991
15	9	"Yipes, It's Snipes"	Unknown	Unknown	April 20, 1991
16	10	"Evian Spelled Backwards Is Naive"	Unknown	Unknown	April 27, 1991
17	11	"Dream Boat"	Unknown	Unknown	May 4, 1991
18	12	"Get Thee Back to a Nunnery"	Unknown	Unknown	May 11, 1991
19	13	"Black Widow"	Unknown	Unknown	May 18, 1991
