= WBEC-TV =

Television station in Boca Raton, Florida

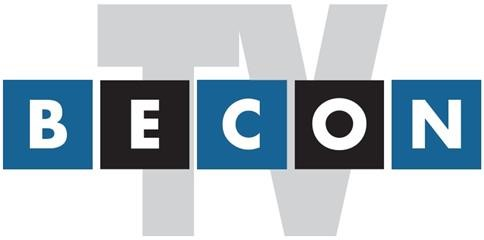
- Boca Raton–Fort Lauderdale, Florida; United States
- City: Boca Raton, Florida
- Channels: Digital: 25 (UHF); Virtual: 63
- Branding: BECON TV

Programming
- Affiliations: 63.1: Educational independent; 63.2: The Florida Channel

Ownership
- Owner: Broward County Public Schools; (The School Board of Broward County, Florida)
- Sister stations: WKPX

History
- First air date: 1999
- Former call signs: WPPB-TV (1986–2008)
- Former channel numbers: Analog: 63 (UHF, 1986–2009); Digital: 40 (UHF, 2009–2018)
- Call sign meaning: Broward Education Communications

Technical information
- Licensing authority: FCC
- Facility ID: 51349
- ERP: 1,000 kW
- HAAT: 285 m (935 ft)
- Transmitter coordinates: 25°59′10″N 80°11′36.3″W

Links
- Public license information: Public file; LMS
- Website: www.becon.tv

WBEC-TV (channel 63) is an educational independent television station licensed to Boca Raton, Florida, United States. It is owned by Broward County Public Schools alongside student radio station WKPX (88.5 FM). The two stations share studios on Nova Drive in Davie; WBEC-TV's transmitter is co-located with that of UniMás outlet WAMI-DT (channel 69) on a tower in the Dale Village mobile home park in Pembroke Park. Although Boca Raton is part of the West Palm Beach television market, WBEC-TV primarily serves Broward County, which is part of the Miami market.

== History ==
Instructional television in the Broward County school system dates to the establishment of a system to send programming among the Broward County schools using Title I funds. The first program was broadcast on January 29, 1968. By 1977, it was distributing 80 series—internally and externally produced—throughout the school system and selling some of its own productions nationally to other school districts. This came despite a stretch earlier in the decade in which instructional television was faced with four budget cuts in as many years. The number of series offered had risen to 130 by 1980. However, changes were made to the ITV system in 1988 in response to a task force report that found it underused, particularly in the middle and high schools, where broadcasts of programming from the ITV center did not correspond with class schedules. It also began to add student-produced programming to its lineup. Some ITV programs were also broadcast on local cable. One example was the ITV Homework Hotline, a weekly call-in show allowing students to ask a teacher questions about math problems. The service changed its name to Broward Education Communications Network (BECON) in 1998.

Meanwhile, the channel 63 construction permit was issued in the late 1980s to Palmetto Broadcasters Associated for Communities and was slated to launch as WPPB-TV, the "Second Season" station, with programming aimed at senior citizens; Palmetto Broadcasters Associated for Communities was affiliated with Palm Beach Atlantic College. PBAC had ambitious broadcasting plans; at the same time it revealed information on the forthcoming WPPB-TV, it announced WTCE-TV (channel 21) in Fort Pierce, which it mostly built but ran out of money to start, alongside a station on channel 9 in Islamorada that would be known as "Hispanivision" (and was never built).

Palmetto Broadcasters did not build the channel, and in 1999, with the construction permit still unbuilt, channel 63 was sold to The Christian Network for $300,000 and finally launched that same year with Christian programming. The Christian Network promptly sold the station to the Broward County school board for $3.6 million in January 2000. With broadcast and cable coverage, the station adopted a format of educational and community programming. On March 15, 2008, the station changed its call letters to WBEC-TV.

In 2019, an outside audit of BECON recommended augmenting its output of school board meetings and educational programming. It noted that equipment and job descriptions were aging, fundraising was weak, and that the primary way the district made revenue with BECON was leasing broadband spectrum. The audit also noted that, of seven full-service TV stations owned by school boards in the United States, WBEC-TV was the only one not part of PBS.

== Technical information ==
=== Subchannels ===
The station's signal is multiplexed:

Subchannels of WBEC-TV
Subchannel	Res.	Short name	Programming
63.1	1080i	WBEC-HD	Main WBEC-TV programming
63.2	1080i	FL Chan	The Florida Channel

=== Analog-to-digital conversion ===
WBEC-TV shut down its analog signal, over UHF channel 63, on June 12, 2009, the official date on which full-power television stations in the United States transitioned from analog to digital broadcasts under federal mandate. The station's digital signal continued to broadcast on its pre-transition UHF channel 40, using virtual channel 63.
