= Danton Stone =

American actor

Danton Stone (born in Queens, New York) is an American stage, film and television actor.

== Stage ==
=== Broadway ===
- Fifth of July (1980) as Weston Hurley
- Angels Fall (1983) as Don Tabaha
- One Flew Over the Cuckoo's Nest (2001) as Martini

=== Off-Broadway (selected) ===
- Mrs. Murray's Farm (1976)
- Balm in Gilead (1984)
- In This Fallen City (1986)
- Fortune's Fools (1995)
- Mere Mortals and Others (1997)

=== Regional ===
- One Flew Over the Cuckoo's Nest, Steppenwolf Theatre Company (2000)
- Miss Julie, Steppenwolf Theatre Company (1985)

== Filmography (selected) ==
- The Chosen (1981) as Fighting Student
- National Lampoon's Joy of Sex (1984) as Farouk
- Maria's Lovers (1984) as Joe
- Band of the Hand (1986) as Aldo
- Eight Men Out (1988) as Hired Killer
- Checking Out (1989) as Dr. Wolfe
- Crazy People (1990) as Saabs
- Once Around (1991) as Tony Bella
- He Said, She Said (1991) as Eric
- McHale's Navy (1997) as Gruber
- The Atlantis Conspiracy (2001) as Barry
- Series 7: The Contenders (2001) as Bob
- Palindromes (2004) as Bruce Wallace
- The Girl in the Park (2007) as Drugstore Manager
- Diminished Capacity (2008) as Police Officer
- Beware the Gonzo (2010) as AP History Teacher

== TV appearances ==
- Eischied (1979) as Eduardo Avila ("The U.N. Connection")
- American Playhouse (1982) as Weston 'Wes' Hurley ("The Fifth of July")
- ABC Afterschool Specials (1986) as J.T. ("The Gift of Amazing Grace")
- Thirtysomething (1988) as Brad Steadman (season 1, episode #16)
- Gideon Oliver (1989) as Luigi ("Tongs")
- Roseanne (1991-1992) as Jerry Bowman
- The Heights (1992) as Father Carmine ("What Does It Take?")
- The Jackie Thomas Show (1993) as David Speckler ("Guys and Balls")
- Grace Under Fire (1993) as Pete Bennett ("A Picture's Worth...$9.95")
- Tom (1994) as Rodney Wilhoit
- My So-Called Life (1995-96 series) as Neil Chase (episodes #2/16/18)
- Law & Order (1995) as Jack Wilderman (episode #119)
- Cosby (1996) ("Neighborhood Watch")
- The Tom Show (1997-1998) as Brownie
- Oz (1998–2000) as D.A. Pat Fortunato (episodes #12/14/27)
- Trinity (1999) ("Breaking In, Breaking Out, Breaking Up, Breaking Down")
- The Sopranos (2000) as Mr. Sontag (episode #17)
- Once and Again (2001) as Mr. Nerolik ("Thieves Like Us")
- Ed (2001) ("Closure")
- Law & Order: Special Victims Unit (2002) as Building Superintendent ("Surveillance")
- Law & Order: Criminal Intent (2002) as Rick Morrissey (episode #18 - "Yesterday")
- Sex and the City (2002) as Patrick ("Unoriginal Sin")
- The Jury (2004) as Officer Morgenstern
- Jonny Zero (2005) as Gerald Hanes (episode #2)
- Hope & Faith (2006) as Ed (episode #65)
- Mercy (2009-2010) as Doctor

== Awards ==
- Drama Desk Award Outstanding Ensemble Acting (1985) for Balm in Gilead
