= The Walter and Hays Band =

- Origin: Salt Lake City, Utah, USA
- Genres: Novelty music 1960s, 1970s, 1980s
- Years active: 1985–1993
- Members: Walter Gregory; Tony Summerhays; Cory Brown; Dan Stephensen

The Walter and Hays Band is an American novelty band from Salt Lake City, Utah. Formed in 1985, the band consists of songwriter/Keyboardist/trumpeter/guitarist Walter Gregory, vocalist/keyboardist/trumpeter Tony Summerhays, bassist/vocalist Cory Brown, and drummer/vocalist Dan Stephensen. The band is best known for their song "Mormon Rap" (1988), which sold approximately 95,000 cassette tapes worldwide, and has become a kind of cult classic in the state of Utah. It played during the early 1990s on the nationally syndicated Dr. Demento radio show. Other songs written by the Walter and Hays Band include "Do the Fusion," “Funny, Funny,” “I’m so Good lookin’,” and "BYU of U."

== History ==
Formed in 1985, The Walter & Hays Band spent eight years together, performing in nearly all of Utah's popular nightclubs, in numerous high-profile social events, for The Primary Children's Miracle Network Telethon in Disneyland, and in locations including The Bahamas, Florida, Hawaii, Las Vegas and other major U.S. cities. The group opened for acts including Stephen Stills, Rich Little, Marie Osmond, Danny Gans, Jay Leno, Michael Floorwax and Jeff Foxworthy. The band disbanded in 1993, but Walt and Tony continue to perform individually as solo acts as well as together as a duo. Walt Gregory, son of actress Mary Ethel Gregory has continued his work as a performer, creating over 100 jingles, touring with Donny and Marie, and doing various vocal impressions. Dan Stephensen currently performs with Easy Street, a cover band based in Utah. He also performs with the George Dyer Show in Arizona.

== Band members ==
- Walter Gregory – keyboards, trumpet, guitar (1985–1993)
- Tony Summerhays – lead vocals, keyboards, trumpet (1985–1993)
- Cory Brown – bass guitar, backing vocals (1985–1993)
- Dan Stephensen – drums, backing vocals (1985–1993)
