= Philip Charles MacKenzie =

American actor, director

Philip Charles MacKenzie MFA
- Born: Brooklyn, New York, U.S.
- Education: New York University (MFA)
- Occupation: Television actor and director
- Years active: 1975–2019
- Known for: Brothers, Roseanne, Frasier, According to Jim
- Spouse(s): Linda Carlson (m. 19??, div. 19??) Alison La Placa (m. 1992)

Philip Charles MacKenzie is an American actor and television director. He is best known for his role as Donald Maltby on Brothers, and as Ted Nichols on Open House, which he worked on with his current wife, Alison La Placa.

== Career ==
MacKenzie was born in Brooklyn, New York. He made his on-screen debut in Sidney Lumet's crime drama Dog Day Afternoon (1975). He then began doing numerous television guest roles and co-starring roles in afterschool specials and made-for-TV movies. MacKenzie guest starred on such series as Three's Company, Baa Baa Black Sheep, Lou Grant (which co-starred his future Brothers castmate, Robert Walden), The Love Boat, The Jeffersons, Diff'rent Strokes, The Facts of Life and WKRP in Cincinnati. In 1980, he appeared as Dr. LaFleur in The Heartbreak Winner, an ABC Afterschool Special episode.

That same year, MacKenzie was cast in the pilot of a series proposed for NBC's 1980 fall schedule, The Six O'Clock Follies, a period piece set in 1967 Saigon. After a single preview telecast in April 1980, the network passed on the series' development. MacKenzie then landed his first regular role on the short-lived CBS sitcom Making the Grade in the spring of 1982. Making the Grade was also the first series role for actor George Wendt, with whom MacKenzie worked later that year when he did a guest appearance on "Coach's Daughter", an episode of NBC's Cheers.

In 1984, MacKenzie began starring as the flamboyant Donald Maltby on the Showtime sitcom Brothers. The series was the first weekly cable sitcom that featured openly gay main characters and was notable for its positive portrayal of its gay characters, particularly Mackenzie’s Character Donald and the character of Cliff Waters (Paul Regina). MacKenzie's portrayal of resident "queen" and Cliff's unlikely friend Donald provided a sharp contrast to Cliff's masculinity.

After the first season concluded, MacKenzie won his first CableACE Award for Best Supporting Actor in a Comedy Series. He was nominated for the same award again in 1987, following the show's third season. He continued doing guest roles in between the shooting of Brothers on series such as Newhart and St. Elsewhere.

In 1989, just as Brothers was ending a five-season run, MacKenzie made a guest appearance on the Fox dramedy series Duet. He appeared as Ted Nichols, a real estate mogul who proposes a business partnership with snobbish yuppie Linda Phillips (played by his current real-life wife, series regular Alison La Placa). Upon the cancelation of Duet, La Placa and MacKenzie's characters were spun off into its sequel comedy series Open House, which centered on Linda and Ted's new venture in real estate. Premiering in August 1989, Open House lasted only a single season. Midway through the 1990-91 season, MacKenzie joined the cast of ABC's Miller/Boyett sitcom Going Places as talk show producer Arnie Ross. MacKenzie was reunited with his Brothers co-star Hallie Todd, who had been one of the four main leads on Going Places since its debut. A few months after his arrival, the series was canceled.

Starting in 1987, MacKenzie began directing selected episodes of Brothers, marking the beginning of a second career behind the camera. Since that time, he has directed episodes of more than 30 television series, including Roseanne, Frasier, Suddenly Susan, Dharma & Greg, Just Shoot Me!, George Lopez, My Wife and Kids, Normal, Sonny with a Chance, The Amanda Show and According to Jim. He directed 36 episodes of According to Jim between 2002 and 2009.

Beginning in the 2000s, MacKenzie also established a career as an acting instructor, specializing in screen and on-camera acting. He has taught as an adjunct professor at the University of Southern California, School of Cinematic Arts and the Chapman University Dodge College of Film and Media Arts; and is currently listed as a faculty member at the prestigious Stella Adler Studio of Acting.

== Personal life ==
MacKenzie was married to actress Linda Carlson from whom he was later divorced. He has been married to actress Alison La Placa since 1992.

== Filmography ==
=== Acting ===
Title	Role	Notes
Dog Day Afternoon	Doctor	
The Jeffersons	Burglar	
Lou Grant	Phillip	
The Love Boat	Bo	
WKRP in Cincinnati	Doug Winner	
Diff'rent Strokes	Leon	
Salvage 1	Kress	
Goodtime Girls	Joey	
The ABC Afterschool Special	Dr. La Fleur	
Three's Company	Roger	
Flying Misfits		
Benson	Guy Kissinger	
The Facts of Life		
The Six O'Clock Follies		
I'm a Big Girl Now	Jack	
Bosom Buddies		
Hart to Hart		
Family Ties	Dan Matthews	
Cheers	Roy	
Remington Steele	Carl Wallace	
Newhart		
Making the Grade	David Wasserman	
St. Elsewhere	Brian Dalton	
Death Ride to Osaka	Cavanaugh	
Girls of the White Orchid	Cavanaugh	
The Red-Light Sting	Ruger	
Brothers	Donald Maltby	Starring role
Blind Justice	John Pierson	
Duet	Ted Nichols	
Wedding Band		
Open House	Ted Nichols	Main cast
Father Dowling Mysteries	Brian Cahill	
Going Places	Arnie Ross	
Princesses	Marty	
Hearts Are Wild	Alan Dumont	
Step by Step	Scooter / Phil the Bellman	
The Jackie Thomas Show		
Elvis Has Left the Building	Darren Swirl	Film
Shade	Doctor Schatz	Short film
Sizzle	Philip	Short film

=== Directing ===
Title	Notes
Brothers	Contributing director
Roseanne	
Frasier	
The Five Mrs. Buchanans	
Madman of the People	
Muddling Through	
Tom	
Almost Perfect	
Boston Common	
Ink	
Suddenly Susan	
Dharma & Greg	
George & Leo	
Hiller and Diller	
Just Shoot Me!	
Temporarily Yours	
Living in Captivity	
The Simple Life	
Attention Shoppers	Film
Normal, Ohio	
My Wife and Kids	
Raising Dad	
According to Jim	36 episodes
George Lopez	
What I Like About You	
I'm with Her	
Married to the Kellys	
It's All Relative	
Out of Practice	
Sonny with a Chance	
Sizzle	Short film
