= Stat (TV series) =

- Created by: Danny Arnold; Tony Sheehan; Chris Hayward
- Starring: Dennis Boutsikaris; Alison La Placa
- Country of origin: United States
- Original language: English
- No. of seasons: 1
- No. of episodes: 6

Production
- Production companies: Tetragram; Touchstone Television

Original release
- Network: ABC
- Release: April 16 – May 21, 1991

Stat is an American television sitcom that aired six episodes, from April 16 to May 21, 1991, on Tuesday night at 9:30 p.m. Eastern Time, on the ABC network.

== Premise ==
The series centered on the staff of New York City's Hudson Memorial Hospital. The show was a remake of the 1977 sitcom A.E.S. Hudson Street.

== Cast ==
- Dennis Boutsikaris as Dr. Tony Menzies
- Ron Canada as Anderson 'Mary' Roche
- David Marguiles as Leonard Sorkin
- Casey Biggs as Dr. Lewis Doniger
- Cynthia Lea Clark as Nurse C
- Alison La Placa as Dr. Elisabeth Newberry

== Episodes ==
No.	Title	Directed by	Written by	Original release date
1	"Psychosomatic"	Danny Arnold	Unknown	April 16, 1991
2	"Fantasy"	Unknown	Unknown	April 23, 1991
3	"Ladyfinger"	Unknown	Unknown	April 30, 1991
4	"The Wilding"	Unknown	Unknown	May 7, 1991
5	"High Society"	Unknown	Unknown	May 14, 1991
5	"Safe Smuggling"	Unknown	Unknown	May 21, 1991
