= Dennis Boutsikaris =

American character actor (born 1952)

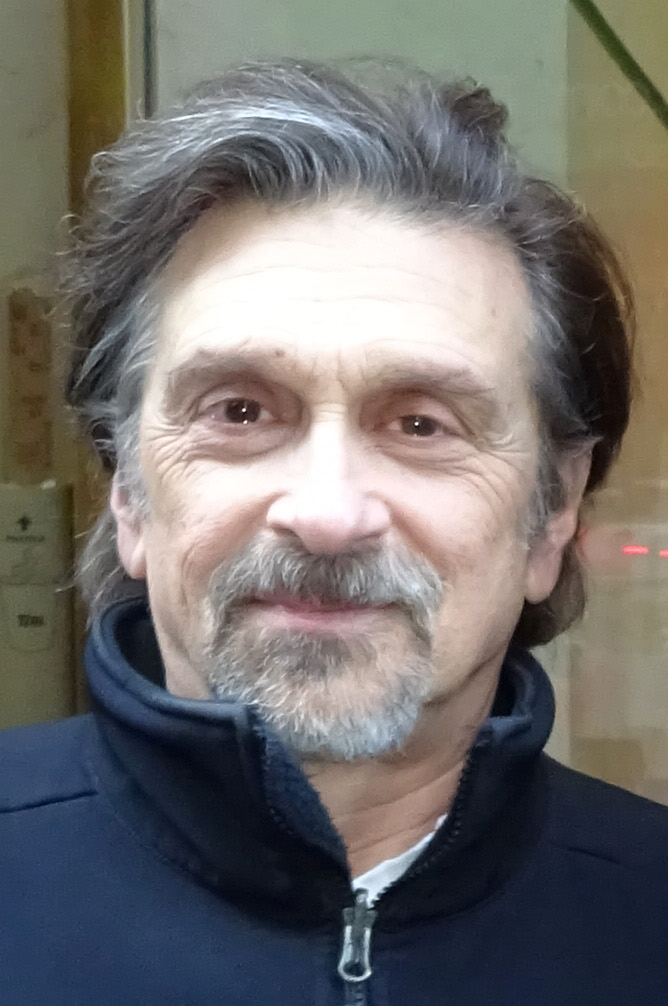
- Boutsikaris in 2016
- Born: December 21, 1952 (age 73); Newark, New Jersey, U.S.
- Occupation: Actor
- Years active: 1973–present
- Spouse: Deborah Hedwall (m. 1982; div. 2002)
- Children: 2
- Website: www.dennisboutsikaris.com

Dennis Boutsikaris (/ˌbuːtsɪˈkærɪs/; born December 21, 1952) is an American stage and film actor. A two-time Obie Award Winner, he has appeared on and off Broadway, being the first American to play Mozart in Amadeus. On television he is best known for his role on Better Call Saul as Rich Schweikart. He has also narrated over 200 audiobooks.

== Early life and education ==
Boutsikaris was born to William and Jane (née Burg) Boutsikaris in Newark, New Jersey. His father was a Greek-American Christian while his mother Jane was Jewish, with her parents immigrating from Minsk, Russian Empire. He grew up in Berkeley Heights, New Jersey. He took up acting while a student at Governor Livingston High School. A graduate of Hampshire College in Amherst, Massachusetts, Boutsikaris toured the country with John Houseman's The Acting Company.

== Career ==
Boutsikaris' film credits include leading roles in *batteries not included, The Dream Team, Crocodile Dundee II, Boys on the Side and In Dreams, among many others. His more recent films include Cherry Crush, The Education of Charlie Banks, Calling It Quits, and Money Monster. He played Paul Wolfowitz in Oliver Stone's W. In 2012, he co-starred in The Bourne Legacy, the fourth installment of the successful Bourne franchise.

On television, he had the lead in the series Stat, The Jackie Thomas Show, and Misery Loves Company. He has also had recurring roles on Sidney Lumet's 100 Centre Street, Nurse, Trinity, ER, Law & Order and Showtime's Shameless. Boutsikaris appeared in an episode of the second season of the show Person of Interest, the second season of Blue Bloods, and in the pilot episode of State of Affairs. From 2015 to 2022, he played the role of lawyer Rich Schweikart in the American series Better Call Saul. In 2017, Boutsikaris was cast in the recurring role of Henry Roarke on the ABC thriller series Quantico. In 2017–2018 Boutsikaris played a recurring role as Malcolm Croft, a professor at MIT and Liam's mentor, in CBS's Salvation.

He has starred in over 20 TV movies, including Chasing the Dragon, And Then There Was One, Three Faces of Karen, Survival on the Mountain, Beyond Betrayal, and as Woody Allen in the miniseries Love and Betrayal: The Mia Farrow Story (with Patsy Kensit).

=== Theater ===
On Broadway Boutsikaris became the first American to play Mozart in Amadeus, and was directed by Laurence Olivier in Filumena. He starred in the Off-Broadway production of Sight Unseen to great critical acclaim.

He has been seen on Broadway in Bent and Amadeus (as the first American to play Mozart) with Frank Langella. He was seen in the Delacorte Theatre's production of Julius Caesar as Cassius. He was in the original New York productions of The Boys Next Door, A Picasso, and the revival of That Championship Season.

Off-Broadway he is probably best known for playing Jonathan Waxman in the original production of Sight Unseen at the Manhattan Theatre Club and later at the Orpheum Theatre. For his performance he received an Obie Award and a Drama Desk Award nomination.. At the Geffen Theatre in Los Angeles he appeared in the premiere of David Mamet's The Old Neighborhood and in 2007 Jane Anderson's The Quality of Life with Laurie Metcalf and Jo Beth Williams. For that performance he received the Backstage West Garland Award for Best Actor and was nominated for Best Actor by the L.A. Critics Drama Circle and by the LA Alliance Ovation Awards.

In 2009 he was in the Broadway revivals of Brighton Beach Memoirs and Broadway Bound, again with Laurie Metcalf. The former opened to wide critical acclaim and then closed one week later. The latter never opened.

He continued his association with Laurie Metcalf, appearing with her in The Other Place Off-Broadway.

=== Voice work ===
He can be heard in over 200 audiobooks and has received eight Audie Awards and two Best Voices of the Year Awards from AudioFile Magazine. He was voted Best Narrator of the Year by Amazon for The Gene.

=== Awards ===
Boutsikaris has received two Obie Awards: one in 1985 for Outstanding Performance in Nest of the Woodgrouse at the New York Shakespeare Festival, directed by Joseph Papp; and one in 1992 for Outstanding Performance in Sight Unseen at the Manhattan Theatre Club. He also received a Drama Desk Award nomination for Best Actor for Sight Unseen, as well as a Cable ACE nomination for Best Supporting Actor for Chasing the Dragon in 1995. He was nominated for a People's Choice Award as best Newcomer. He received the Best Actor Award at the Staten Island Film Festival and the Long island Film Festival for his role in Calling It Quits.

== Personal life ==
Boutsikaris was married to actress Deborah Hedwall.

== Filmography ==
=== Film ===
List of Dennis Boutsikaris film credits
Year	Title	Role	Ref(s)
1973	Jeremy	Danny	
1980	The Exterminator	Frankie	
1983	Very Close Quarters	Alex	
1985	War and Love	Marek	
1987	Batteries Not Included	Mason Baylor	
1988	Crocodile Dundee II	Bob Tanner	
1989	Thunderboat Row	Tom Rampy	
1989	The Dream Team	Dr. Jeffrey "Jeff" Weitzman	
1991	Talent for the Game	Greg Rossi	
1991	The Boy Who Cried Bitch	Orin Fell	
1995	Boys on the Side	Massarelli	
1996	Surviving Picasso	Kootz	
1999	Taken	Bill McMurtrey	
1999	In Dreams	Dr. Stevens	
2001	They Crawl	Professor Jurgen	
2002	Crazy Little Thing	Dr. Levy	
2007	Cherry Crush	Ben Wells	
2007	The Education of Charlie Banks	Mr. Banks	
2008	W.	Paul Wolfowitz	
2010	My Soul to Take	Principal Pratt	
2012	The Bourne Legacy	Terrence Ward	
2014	She's Lost Control	Dr. Alan Cassidy	
2015	Freeheld	Pat Gerry	
2016	Money Monster	Avery Goodloe CFO	
2016	The Inherited	Sanders	
2019	Cliffs of Freedom	Theodoros Kolokotronis	
2019	Impossible Monsters	Steven	
2021	Violet	Tom Gaines	
2022	Pinball: The Man Who Saved the Game	Mr. Sharpe	

=== Television series ===
List of Dennis Boutsikaris television series credits
Year	Title	Role	Notes	Ref(s)
1980	The American Short Story	Vito	Episode: "Rappaccini's Daughter"	
1981–1982	Nurse	Joe Calvo	10 episodes	
1987	CBS Summer Playhouse	Keith	Episode: "In the Lion's Den"	
1987	The Equalizer	C.R. Heaton	Episode: "In the Money"	
1988	American Playhouse	Christopher Boucher	Episode: "The Trial of Bernhard Goetz"	
1988	Tattingers	Scott Spalding	Episode: "The Sonny Always Rises"	
1989	Dream Street	Michael	Episode: "Girl's Talk"	
1989	The Equalizer	Yorgi Kostov	Episode: "Time Present, Time Past"	
1990	Matlock	Professor John Gallagher	Episode: "The Student"	
1990–2004	Law & Order	Various	7 episodes	
1991	Stat	Dr. Tony Menzies	Main role; 6 episodes	
1991	Sisters	David Joseph Levitsky	Episode: "A Kiss is Still a Kiss"	
1991	Palace Guard	Marshal	Episode: "Enchanted Simian Evening"	
1991	Pros and Cons	Robert Wills	Episode: "Ho! Ho! Hold Up!"	
1992–1993	The Jackie Thomas Show	Jerry Harper	Main role; 18 episodes	
1994	Murphy Brown	Marty Crane	Episode: "A Piece of the Auction"	
1994	Murder, She Wrote	Dr. Jerry Santana	Episode: "Murder on the Thirteenth Floor"	
1995	Misery Loves Company	Joe	Main role; 8 episodes	
1996	The Burning Zone	Dr. Steven Rydell	Episode: "Touch of the Dead"	
1997	The Last Don	Skippy Deere	Miniseries; 2 episodes	
1998	Diagnosis: Murder	Neil Burnside	2 episodes	
1998	ER	Dr. David Kotlowitz	4 episodes	
1998–1999	Trinity	Josh Beekman	7 episodes	
1999–2014	Law & Order: Special Victims Unit	Various	3 episodes	
2000	Perfect Murder, Perfect Town	Chief Koby	Miniseries; 2 episodes	
2000	Touched by an Angel	Alan Berger	Episode: "Bar Mitzvah"	
2000	The X-Files	Dr. Peter Voss	Episode: "Brand X"	
2000	Bull	Hal Bridgewater	Episode: "In the Course of Human Events"	
2001	Nash Bridges	Robert Saxon	Episode: "Slam Dunk!"	
2001	The Fugitive	Agent Gagomiros	2 episodes	
2001–2002	100 Centre Street	Gil Byrnes	9 episodes	
2002	The Practice	U.S. Attorney Greg Mitchell	Episode: "Judge Knot"	
2002	Third Watch	Ray Henry	2 episodes	
2002	Monk	Dr. Morris Lancaster	Episode: "Mr. Monk Goes to the Asylum"	
2002	The Agency	DEA Agent Riddick	Episode: "Heartless"	
2003	7th Heaven	Dr. Norton	Episode: "The One Thing"	
2004	Dragnet	LaPlatt	Episode: "Frame of Mind"	
2005	Crossing Jordan	Dr. Bernard Krump	Episode: "You Really Got Me"	
2005	Las Vegas	Lance Marshall	Episode: "Down and Dirty"	
2005–2006	Related	Professor Kasnov	4 episodes	
2006	Criminal Minds	Lance Wagner	Episode: "A Real Rain"	
2006–2007	Close to Home	Paul Ramont	2 episodes	
2006–2007	Six Degrees	Leonard Ralston	4 episodes	
2007	CSI: Crime Scene Investigation	Dr. Sidney Buckman	Episode: "Leapin' Lizards"	
2008	Shark	D.A. Lester Rivers	Episode: "Leaving Las Vegas"	
2009	Law & Order: Criminal Intent	Dr. Ernst	Episode: "In Treatment"	
2009	Kings	Minister Fawkes	2 episodes	
2010	Medium	Dr. Anthony Woodel	Episode: "Psych"	
2010	Grey's Anatomy	Don Taylor	Episode: "Push"	
2010	House	Artie	Episode: "Black Hole"	
2010	Outlaw	Prosecutor	Episode: "Pilot"	
2011–2012	Shameless	Professor Hearst	5 episodes	
2011–2012	The Good Wife	Tommy Segarra	2 episodes	
2012	Blue Bloods	Jack Quayle	Episode: "Collateral Damage"	
2013	The Mentalist	Dr. Rubin	Episode: "Days of Wine and Roses"	
2013	Elementary	Gerald Lydon	Episode: "Possibility Two"	
2013	Body of Proof	John Anderson	Episode: "Disappearing Act"	
2013	Person of Interest	Dr. Richard Nelson	Episode: "In Extremis"	
2014	Satisfaction	Preston	Episode: "...Through Self Discovery"	
2014	State of Affairs	CIA Director Skinner	Episode: "Pilot"	
2015	Madam Secretary	Gary Coomer	Episode: "The Time Is at Hand"	
2015–2022	Better Call Saul	Rich Schweikart	Recurring role; 15 episodes	
2016	Rectify	Bernie	Episode: "Yolk"	
2016–2018	Billions	Kenneth Malverne	4 episodes	
2017	Quantico	Henry Roarke	6 episodes	
2017–2018	Salvation	Dr. Malcolm Croft	11 episodes	
2018	MacGyver	Elliot Lambeau	Episode: "Bozer + Booze + Back to School"	
2019	FBI	President Edgar Whitman	Episode: "A New Dawn"	
2019	Blindspot	Lucas Nash	2 episodes	
2020	Prodigal Son	William Voight	Episode: "Wait & Hope"	
2020	Bull	Judge Thornton	Episode: "Quid Pro Quo"	
2020	The Blacklist	Judge Leonard Borns	Episode: "Gordon Kemp (No. 158)"	
2022	The Equalizer	Judge Clemmens	Episode: "D.W.B."	
2023–present	Mayfair Witches	Alan Albrecht	7 episodes	
2024	Sugar	Bernie Siegel	Main role	

=== Television films ===
List of Dennis Boutsikaris television film credits
Year	Title	Role	Ref(s)
1986	Liberty	Joseph Pulitzer	
1988	Internal Affairs	Jerry Renfrew	
1989	Big Time	Michael	
1991	The Hit Man	Unnamed Hollywood producer	
1991	Love, Lies and Murder	Baruch	
1992	The Keys	Leeson	
1993	Victim of Love: The Shannon Mohr Story	Jack Mandel	
1994	Tonya and Nancy: The Inside Story	Screenplay writer	
1994	The Yarn Princess	Steven Hoffman	
1994	Beyond Betrayal	Sam	
1994	And Then There Was One	Vinnie Ventola	
1995	Love and Betrayal: The Mia Farrow Story	Woody Allen	
1996	Chasing the Dragon	Nat	
1996	Sudden Terror: The Hijacking of School Bus No. 17	Frank Caldwell	
1997	The Three Lives of Karen	Paul	
1997	Survival on the Mountain	Joe Hoffman	
2000	Custody of the Heart	Nick Brody	
