= Cold open =

Narrative technique used in television and films

A cold open (also called a teaser sequence) is a narrative technique used in television and film. It is the practice of jumping directly into a story at the beginning of the show before the title sequence or opening credits are shown. In North American television, this is often done on the theory that involving the audience in the plot as soon as possible will reduce the likelihood of their switching to a different channel during the opening commercial. A cold open may also be used to recap events from previous episodes or storylines that will be revisited during the current episode.

The cold open technique is also used in film. In cinematic contexts, "cold opening" refers to the opening moments or scenes, though not necessarily to the full duration prior to the title card, which may appear well after the start.

== Development ==
In the early 1960s, few American series used cold opens, and half-hour sitcoms almost never made use of them prior to 1965. Many American series that ran from the early 1960s through the mid-1960s (including sitcoms) adopted cold opens in later seasons. However, beginning in the late 1950s, several dramatic series—notably Warner Bros. series such as 77 Sunset Strip—would cold-open with an attention-grabbing scene from the middle of the episode, which would repeat when the story arrived at that point.

Cold opens became widespread on American television by the mid-1960s. Their use was an economical way of setting up a plot without having to introduce the regular characters or the series synopsis, which would typically be outlined in the title sequence itself.

British producer Lew Grade's efforts to enter the American market led to various shows he was involved with incorporating the cold open. Subsequently, many British action-adventure series employed the format, such as The New Avengers (1976–1977) and The Professionals (1977–1981).

During the 1960s and 1970s, daytime soap operas became primary users of cold opens, with most American soap operas adopting the format.

In the late 1970s and early 1980s, some programs began with highlights from the previous episode. Throughout the 1970s and 1980s, many traditional multi-camera sitcoms launched straight into the opening theme music, though this changed in modern production. Modern single-camera and multi-camera American sitcoms routinely use cold opens lasting between one and four minutes before transitioning into the title sequence or theme music.

Documentaries do not use cold openings as frequently as fictional shows. The World at War (1973–1974) is a notable exception, featuring a poignant moment in its opening minutes before the title sequence, followed by full context after the credits.

== Current uses in television ==
=== News ===
Most American news programs, including those on 24-hour news networks, use cold opens to introduce a summary of the top stories covered in that broadcast.

=== Dramas ===
Cold opens are common in science fiction and crime dramas. In the United States, television shows occasionally forgo a cold open at the midway point of a two-part episode or during special events. Vince Gilligan has been described by critics as a master of the cold open for his work on Breaking Bad and Better Call Saul. The Australian drama series McLeod's Daughters used a cold open for the majority of its run before phasing it out for its eighth and final season. Despite not featuring in the original 1963–1989 run, the 2005 revival of Doctor Who featured cold openings consistently until 2017, using them intermittently thereafter. Procedural series such as Law & Order utilize a pre-credits cold open that traditionally ends with the discovery of a crime, followed by the show's signature sound effect.

=== Soap operas ===
While several soaps experimented with regular opens in the early 2000s, all American daytime dramas currently use cold opens. Typically, a soap opera cold open begins where the last scene of the previous episode ended, sometimes replaying the full scene. After several setup scenes, the opening credits are shown. By contrast, most British soap operas begin with standard title sequences. In Australia, the soap opera Home and Away briefly used cold opens in 2006.

=== Comedy ===
One of the most prominent users of the technique, Saturday Night Live, has regularly featured a cold-open sketch since its premiere in 1975. Many modern American sitcoms use or have used cold opens, including Friends, Young Sheldon, Malcolm in the Middle, The Office, Reba, Home Improvement, Full House, The Big Bang Theory, How I Met Your Mother, Two and a Half Men, Modern Family, That '70s Show, Cheers, Family Matters, Parks and Recreation, and Brooklyn Nine-Nine. Other comedy formats, such as late-night talk shows and satirical news programs, also use cold opens. Sitcom cold opens frequently present a standalone joke or scenario unrelated to the main plot of the episode.

=== Children's programming ===
Several children's animated series use cold opens to establish the main conflict or premise of an episode, including Gravity Falls, Pokémon, Littlest Pet Shop, My Little Pony: Friendship Is Magic, and Pac-Man and the Ghostly Adventures.

=== Sports ===
The UFC frequently airs a cold open segment before main pay-per-view broadcasts to build anticipation for upcoming fights.

== In other media ==
=== Film ===
In film production, the section of the film prior to the main titles is referred to as the pre-credits sequence, which is often structured as a cold open. Some films feature a brief opening scene to introduce characters or plot points that become crucial later in the narrative.

A prominent example is the James Bond film series, which traditionally begins with a cold open featuring an action or chase scene following the gun barrel sequence and preceding the main title sequence. In horror films, pre-credit scenes often feature an early casualty to establish the threat of the antagonist, as seen in Scream, Cube, and entries in the Saw franchise.

In some films, the title card does not appear until the end of the movie.

=== Podcasts ===
Cold opens are utilized in podcasts to introduce skits, excerpts, or informal host dialogue before the official show intro. Independent comedy, news, and narrative podcasts employ cold opens as structural hooks or meta-commentary on episode themes.

=== Radio ===
Cold opens were occasionally used in classic radio programming. Programs such as The Jack Benny Program would sometimes forgo standard announcer introductions at the start of a season, launching directly into a sketch to give listeners the impression of overhearing the performers off-microphone before transitioning into formal program credits.

=== Video games ===
Many video games feature cold opens, initiating gameplay or narrative cutscenes before displaying the title screen or main menu. The format is common in Japanese role-playing games, with the original Final Fantasy serving as an early example.

=== Web series ===
Some web series have cold opens, most notably the American series Battle for Dream Island and other shows of its kind (object shows).

== Nomenclature ==
Cold opens frequently employ a narrative segment known as a "teaser". A May 2, 1966 memorandum written by Gene Roddenberry for the original Star Trek series described the structure:

a. Teaser, preferably three pages or less. Captain Kirk's voice-over opens the show, briefly setting where we are and what's going on. This is usually followed by a short playing scene which ends with the Teaser "hook".

The "hook" of the teaser presents an intriguing or unresolved plot element designed to keep viewers engaged through the commercial break and title sequence.

In television series, a similar structural device used prior to commercial breaks within the episode is called a cliffhanger. A brief scene following the main or end credits is known as a tag or post-credits sequence.

== See also ==
- Hot switch
- In medias res
