= Jon Cypher =

American actor (1932–2026)

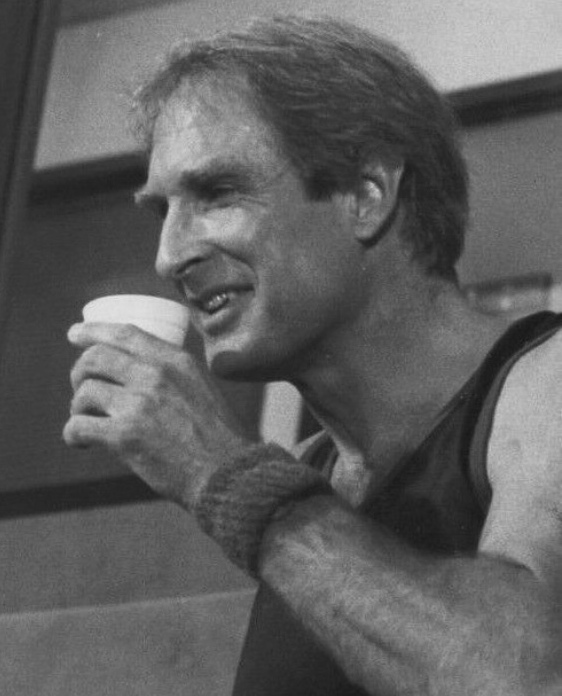
- Cypher in Hill Street Blues, 1983
- Born: January 13, 1932; New York City, U.S.
- Died: August 3, 2026 (aged 94); Central Point, Oregon, U.S.
- Education: Brooklyn College
- Occupations: Actor; singer
- Years active: 1957–2004
- Spouses: Ruth Wagner (m. 1965; div. 1975); Carol Rosin (m. 1986)

Jon Cypher (January 13, 1932 – August 3, 2026) was an American actor and singer. He was best known for his role of Chief of Police Fletcher Daniels in Hill Street Blues throughout the series's run and as Man-At-Arms in the 1987 Masters of the Universe film. He was also known for his work in Cinderella, As the World Turns, Major Dad, Probe and Santa Barbara. He performed on Broadway, particularly in musical theatre.

== Early life and education ==
Born in New York City, Cypher graduated from Erasmus Hall High School (1949) and Brooklyn College (1953).

Cypher later received a master's degree in marriage and family counseling from the University of Vermont.

== Career ==
Cypher made his television debut as the Prince in the original 1957 production of Rodgers and Hammerstein's Cinderella opposite Julie Andrews in the title role. He is particularly remembered as Chief of Police Fletcher Daniels in Hill Street Blues, a role he played throughout the run of the series (1981–87). He played Commanding General Marcus Craig on Major Dad, alongside Gerald McRaney and Beverly Archer, and appeared as Howard Millhouse in the short-lived television series Probe. He played Dr. Alex Keith on As the World Turns (1977–79) and Dr. Arthur Donnelly on Santa Barbara (1988–89).

Other television credits include the recurring roles of Belson in The F.B.I., Dirk Maurier in Dynasty, Eric Brandon in Marcus Welby, M.D., and Jeff Munson in Knots Landing. He also voiced the villain Spellbinder in the animated television series Batman Beyond.

He made his first film appearance as the villain Frank Tanner in the 1971 Western Valdez Is Coming opposite Burt Lancaster and Susan Clark. He took on the role of the heroic Man-At-Arms in the 1987 film Masters of the Universe. He also starred in an episode of Barnaby Jones entitled "Dangerous Gambit", which originally aired on February 26, 1976. Cypher has since appeared periodically in films up through the late 1990s, in mostly featured character parts.

Cypher had an active career on the stage in both musicals and plays. In 1956, he appeared at Denver's Elitch Theatre, as the leading man for the summer stock cast, where productions included The Rainmaker, Noël Coward's Tonight at 8.30, and The Chalk Garden.

He made his Broadway debut as Wister LaSalle in the original 1959 production of Harvey Breit's The Disenchanted. He returned to Broadway in 1962 to replace Patrick O'Neal as the Reverend T. Lawrence Shannon in the original production of Tennessee Williams's The Night of the Iguana. He portrayed the role of Dr. Carrasco in the original 1965 cast of Man of La Mancha, later taking over the role of Don Quixote.

In 1967, he performed the role of Bert Jefferson in the original musical Sherry! by James Lipton and Laurence Rosenthal. His other Broadway credits include The Great White Hope, 1776, Coco, and Big: The Musical.

Between 1990 and 1993, Cypher appeared in 69 episodes of the CBS comedy series Major Dad as Brigadier General Marcus Craig.

On July 20, 1992, Cypher fell down a darkened stairway during a dress rehearsal for his role as Fagin in Oliver!. He broke his leg in two places and was forced to play Fagin while seated in a wheelchair. Cypher later sued the theater and a performance company in Pittsburgh for $20,000. In a 2013 interview, Cypher revealed that he still walked with a cane.

In a 2014 interview, Cypher stated that poverty was the secret to his 47-year-long career.

== Personal life and death ==
Cypher was married to Ruth Wagner from 1965 to 1975. After they divorced, he married scientist Carol Rosin in 1986.

Cypher died at his home in Central Point, Oregon, on August 3, 2026, at the age of 94.

== Filmography ==
=== Film ===
Year	Title	Role	Notes
1971	Valdez Is Coming	Frank Tanner	
1971	Believe in Me	Alan	
1973	Lady Ice	Eddie Stell	
1973	Blade	Petersen	
1974	Memory of Us	Brad	
1974	The Kid and the Killers	Roper	
1975	The Kingfisher Caper	Johnny Lance	
1976	The Food of the Gods	Brian	
1987	Masters of the Universe	Duncan/Man-At-Arms	
1987	Off the Mark	John C. Roosevelt	
1989	Accidents	James Hughs	
1990	Spontaneous Combustion	Dr. Marsh	
1990	The Sandgrass People	Walter Carter	
1991	Strictly Business	Drake	
1998	Walking to the Waterline	Fred Blumquist	

=== Television ===
Year	Title	Role	Notes
1957	Cinderella	Prince Christopher	Television film
1957	Armstrong Circle Theatre	Richie Braman, Miklos	2 episodes
1962	Our Five Daughters	Driscoll	160 episodes
1964	NBC Children's Theatre	King Richard	Episode: "Robin Hood"
1964	Flipper	Jim Lorman	Episode: "Countdown for Flipper"
1967	Coronet Blue	Ewan McBurney	Episode: "A Time to be Born"
1970	Nanny and the Professor	Professor Englund	Episode: "E.S. Putt"
1971‍–‍1973	The Doris Day Show	Sir Robert Kingsley	2 episodes
1972	McMillan & Wife	John Thomas Clark	Episode: "The Face of Murder"
1972	Mission: Impossible	Art Stafford	Episode: "Trapped"
1972	Bonanza	Col. Cody Ransom	Episode: "A Place to Hide"
1972	Mannix	Wallace Hunter, Phillip Lomax	2 episodes
1973	Circle of Fear	Keith	Episode: "Legion of Demons"
1974	Cannon	Lt. Lou Hayes	Episode: "Bobby Loved Me"
1974	Night Games	Dale Hannigan	Television film
1974	The F.B.I.	Belson	Episode: "Survival"
1974	The Rookies	Dr. Stafford	Episode: "Key Witness"
1975	Marcus Welby, M.D.	Eric Brandon	4 episodes
1976	Barnaby Jones	Frank Dunlap	Episode: "Dangerous Gambit"
1976	Bronk	Lundeen	Episode: "The Vigilante"
1977	Police Woman	Skip Arnold	Episode: "The Disco Killer"
1977	The Feather and Father Gang	Cal Cooper	Episode: "Sun, Sand, and Death"
1977	The Rockford Files	Michael Kelly	2 episodes
1978–1979	As the World Turns	Dr. Alexander Keith	2 episodes
1979	The Love Boat	Russell Evans	Episode: "Not Now, I'm Dying"
1980	Freebie and the Bean	Dwight Rollins	Episode: "Flying Aces"
1981	Evita Peron	Col. Imbert	Television film
1981	General Hospital	Max Van Stadt	Episode #1.4687
1981–1983	Trapper John, M.D.	Marshall Randolph, Andrew Forsyte	2 episodes
1981–1987	Hill Street Blues	Chief Fletcher Daniels	Main cast; 71 episodes
1982	Today's F.B.I.	Le Duc	Episode: "Spy"
1982	The Greatest American Hero	Richard Beller	Episode: "Now You See it"
1982–1983	Knots Landing	Jeff Munson	12 episodes
1983	Knight Rider	George Atherton	Episode: "Soul Survivor"
1983–1987	Dynasty	Dirk E. Maurier	10 episodes
1985	Malice in Wonderland	Dr. Harry 'Docky' Martin	Television film
1985	Lime Street	Kyle Stoddard	Episode: "Odd Pilots Never Die"
1986	Hotel	Richard Copeland	Episode: "Triangles"
1986	Perry Mason: The Case of the Notorious Nun	Dr. Peter Lattimore	Television film
1986–1993	Murder, She Wrote	Capt. Rory O'Neil, Nathan Swarthmore, Max Flynn	3 episodes
1987	The Law & Harry McGraw	Sam Wallace	Episode: "Angela's Secret"
1987	Hunter	Alan Shadwell	Episode: "Turning Point"
1988	Elvis and Me	Captain Joseph Paul Beaulieu	Television film
1988	Probe	Howard Millhouse	2 episodes
1988	Lady Mobster	Alfred Mallory	Television film
1988	Favorite Son	Bartholomew Scott	Episode: "Part One"
1988–1989	Santa Barbara	Dr. Arthur Donnelly	Recurring role; 57 episodes
1988–1989	Tour of Duty	Major General Goldman	2 episodes
1989	Duet	John	Episode: "The Birth of a Saleswoman"
1989	Open House	John Green	2 episodes
1990	B.L. Stryker	Felix Renza	Episode: "High Rise"
1990	Valerie	Mr. Edwards	Episode: "A Matter of Principal"
1990	Snow Kill	Reid	Television film
1990–1993	Major Dad	General Marcus C. Craig	Main Role; 69 episodes
1994	Love & War	Anthony	Episode: "I've Got a Crush on You"
1994	The Commish	Bill Kelton	Episode: "Dead Drunk"
1994	RoboCop	General Eugene Omar	Episode: "Ghosts of War"
1995	Burke's Law	Ben Fletcher	Episode: "Who Killed the Motor Car Maverick?"
1995	The Invaders	Sen. Alex Feinman	2 episodes
1995–2000	Law & Order	Jerome Kamen, Harlan Graham	2 episodes
1996	Dr. Quinn, Medicine Woman	Preston Lodge	Episode: "The Tempest"
1997	Pinky and the Brain	Administrator (voice)	Episode: "Bah, Wilderness"
1997	Profiler	Judge Neil MacGruder	Episode: "Power Corrupts"
1998	JAG	Frank Burnett	Episode: "To Russia with Love"
1999	Rescue 77	Charles Bell	2 episodes
1999	Walker, Texas Ranger	Waylon Cox	Episode: "Full Recovery"
1999–2000	Batman Beyond	Ira Billings / Spellbinder (voice)	3 episodes
2000	Honey, I Shrunk the Kids: The TV Show	Colonel Coleman	Episode: "Honey, It's an Interplanetary, Extraordinary Life"

=== Theatre ===
Year	Title	Role	Venue	Type	Notes
1958	The Disenchanted	Wister LaSalle	Coronet Theatre	Broadway	
1961	The Night of the Iguana	The Reverend T. Lawrence Shannon	Royale Theatre	Broadway	U/s
1963	Jennie	Randolph of the Royal Mounted/Others	Majestic Theatre	Broadway	Standby
1964	As You Like It		Lucille Lortel Theatre	Off-Broadway	
1965	Man of La Mancha	Dr. Carrasco	Martin Beck Theatre	Broadway	
1965	The Wives	Herakles	Stage 73	Off-Broadway	
1965	The Great Western Union	Robert	Bouwerie Lane Theatre	Off-Broadway	
1967	Sherry!	Bert Jefferson	Alvin Theatre	Broadway	
1968	The Great White Hope	Mr. Cameron/Others	Alvin Theatre	Broadway	
1969	1776	Thomas Jefferson	46th Street Theatre	Broadway	Replacement
1969	Coco	Papa	Mark Hellinger Theatre	Broadway	
1970‍–‍1972	1776	Thomas Jefferson	Touring production		
1971	Coco	Julian Lesage	Touring production		
1973	Oliver!	Bill Sikes	Touring production		
1980–1982	Evita	Juan Perón	Touring production		
1984	42nd Street	Julian Marsh	Touring production		
1996	Big	MacMillan	Shubert Theatre	Broadway	
