= Hot switch =

In broadcast programming, a hot switch or hotswitching is where the ending of one television show leads directly into the start of the show in the next time slot without a television commercial break. The concept is used to reduce the chances that people will switch to another TV network during the commercial break and allow the cold open of the new show to attract viewers; sometimes however, this will cause a commercial break right after the opening credits. It can also be called "seamless" broadcasting and is frequently used during television marathons and back-to-back airings of episodes of the same series. The technique is also used by many local network affiliates in the United States to seamlessly transition from a local newscast to a network newscast.

== Examples ==
In December 1992, for the premiere of The Jackie Thomas Show, a hot switch was used where the end of an episode of Roseanne had the Connor family watching the new show on television, and then the new show began. To see if this worked, ABC paid ACNielsen for a minute by minute ratings report, and found that most viewers stayed with the new show for the entire pilot episode.

== See also ==
- Television scheduling
- Audience flow
- Channel surfing
- Cliffhanger
