= Open House (1989 TV series) =

American sitcom

- Genre: Sitcom
- Created by: Ruth Bennett; Susan Seeger
- Written by: Bruce Ferber
- Directed by: Dwayne Hickman; Philip Charles MacKenzie; Arlene Sanford; David Semel; Lee Shallat Chemel; Michael Zinberg
- Starring: Alison La Placa; Mary Page Keller; Chris Lemmon; Ellen DeGeneres
- Composer: John Beasley
- Country of origin: United States
- Original language: English
- No. of seasons: 1
- No. of episodes: 24

Production
- Executive producers: Ruth Bennett; Susan Seeger
- Producers: Deborah Leschin; Linda Nieber; Barry Vigon; Tom Walla
- Camera setup: Multi-camera
- Running time: 22–24 minutes
- Production companies: Ubu Productions; Paramount Television

Original release
- Network: Fox
- Release: August 27, 1989 – May 6, 1990

Related
- Duet

Open House is an American sitcom that aired Sunday at 9:30 on Fox from August 27, 1989, to May 6, 1990. The series was a spin-off of the Fox series Duet.

== Synopsis ==
Open House starred Alison La Placa as Linda Phillips, the former studio executive who brought the same zeal pushing costly houses for Juan Verde Real Estate as she did working at World Wide Studios. The series also starred Mary Page Keller and Chris Lemmon continuing their roles as Laura Kelly and Richard Phillips. Newly separated from her writer husband Ben Coleman, Laura also quit catering, and became an apprentice agent. Richard, Linda's husband, was a pianist at Jasper's, but left the hangout — and his wife — by mid-season. Among Linda's eccentric co-workers were Ted Nichols (Philip Charles MacKenzie), her main rival; Scott Babylon (Danny Gans), a talented impressionist; Margo Van Meter (Ellen DeGeneres), the sassy, man-hungry secretary; and Roger McSwain (Nick Tate), the manager of Juan Verde.

The premise of the series had originated in the series finale of Duet, in which Linda was introduced to Ted, who brought her to Juan Verde to start her new career. LaPlaca and MacKenzie had been dating for several years by the time they worked opposite each other on Duet and Open House (they first worked together on a 1985 episode of MacKenzie's former series, Brothers).

== Cast ==
- Alison LaPlaca as Linda Phillips
- Mary Page Keller as Laura Kelly
- Chris Lemmon as Richard Phillips
- Philip Charles MacKenzie as Ted Nichols
- Danny Gans as Scott Babylon
- Ellen DeGeneres as Margo Van Meter
- Nick Tate as Roger McSwain

== Episodes ==
No.	Title	Directed by	Written by	Original release date	Prod. code
1	"Fish Out of Water"	Dwayne Hickman	Bruce Ferber (Teleplay), Vic Rauseo & Linda Morris (Story)	August 27, 1989	40263–055
John Green is looking for someone to head up the new Sherman Oaks office, so Ted and Linda each vie for the job, but neither is pleased when they join Mr. Green on a fishing trip. Also, Laura is hired to provide catering for the company's open houses. Guest Stars: Ginger Orsi (Amanda Phillips), Arleen Sorkin (Geneva), Ray Buktenica (Dave Hayes), Jon Cypher (John Green); Note: Linda sold her home to Dave Hayes in the series finale of Duet, but that plot point was completely ignored in this episode, in which Linda still resides in the same home and Dave is still desperately in search of a house that he'll be happy with. Song: Row, Row, Row Your Boat (Danny Gans)
2	"Scenes from an Office Marriage"	David Semel	Vic Rauseo & Linda Morris (teleplay), Bruce Ferber (story)	September 3, 1989	40263–056
Mr. Green becomes sick of Ted and Linda's continuous quarrels, so he sends them to a marriage counselor. Guest Stars: Ginger Orsi (Amanda Phillips), Arleen Sorkin (Geneva), Ray Buktenica (Dave Hayes), Jon Cypher (John Green), Judith-Marie Bergen (Dr. Weber), Karen Salkin (Phyllis Hayes), Eric Nieber (Mr. Nieber); Songs: To All the Girls I've Loved Before (Danny Gans), Fever (Chris Lemmon & Mary Page Keller)
3	"Going for Broker"	Michael Zinberg	Bruce Ferber	September 10, 1989	40263–059
Laura's marriage to Ben imploded and she's sick of catering, so she decides to become a realtor. Also, Roger McSwain replaces John Green, who joined the witness relocation program. Guest Stars: Ray Buktenica (Dave Hayes); Songs: Angst (Chris Lemmon)
4	"Whodunnit?"	Michael Zinberg	Charlene Seeger	September 17, 1989	40263–057
Laura's client dumps her just after Mr. McSwain gives her an ultimatum: sell a house or leave the firm. When Linda gets wind of the situation, she enlists Ted to try to help. Guest Star: Angelo Tiffe (Tony)
5	"Second Honeymoon, Anyone?"	Michael Zinberg	Barry Vigon & Deborah Leschin	September 24, 1989	40263–058
Richard and Linda's marriage is on the rocks, so Ted and Laura individually drag them to a hotel to rekindle their romance, but hijinks ensue revolving around a confused newlywed couple. Guest Stars: Diana Georger (Jean), John Lavachielli (Jack),
6	"Dome Sweet Dome"	Lee Shallat Chemel	Bruce Ferber	October 1, 1989	40263–060
Ted and Linda head to a remote locale in the woods to check out an unusual dome house, but they discover the owner's nowhere to be found and there's a bear outside the door. Guest Star: Ray Buktenica (Dave Hayes)
7	"Let's Get Physicals"	Lee Shallat Chemel	Barry Vigon & Deborah Leschin	October 8, 1989	40263–061
When the staff gets physical examinations, Linda decides to play a prank on Ted by switching his medical records. Guest Stars: Jennifer Darling (Dr. Janet Baylor), Barbara Alyn Woods (Noreen), Jerry Hauk (The Doctor), Jay Arlen Jones (The Internist), Ellis Levinson (The Cardiologist)
8	"Married Without Children"	Lee Shallat Chemel	Tom Walla	October 22, 1989	40263–062
Ted's condescending mother comes for a visit and has an instant rapport with Linda, whom he assumes is his wife. Linda hesitantly plays along, but complications arise when each of their coworkers also claims to be his bride. Guest Star: Marian Mercer (Dorothy Nichols)
9	"Torn Between Two Houses"	Arlene Sanford	Charlene Seeger	October 29, 1989	40263–063
Dave's fed up with Ted's shenanigans, so he turns to Linda to find him a home. Meanwhile, Scott fixes up Margo with an exotic foreigner who finally takes her virginity. Guest Stars: Ray Buktenica (Dave Hayes), Dore Keller (Lenny Maroni),
10	"Murder, He Wrote"	Arlene Sanford	Adam Markowitz	November 5, 1989	40263–064
Laura becomes wary of the creepy new client Linda and Ted have been schmoozing, so she investigates and discovers he was recently released from a mental institution and has a homicidal dislike of realtors. Guest Stars: Ernie Sabella (Jack Doe), Aaron Lustig (Fred Fagey), Monica Burnett (Freida Fagey)
11	"In Vegas ... With Showgirls!: Part 1"	Arlene Sanford	Barry Vigon, Deborah Leschin & Bruce Ferber	November 12, 1989	40263–065
When the gang heads to Las Vegas for a real estate convention, Margo masquerades as a princess, Mr. McSwain schmoozes with showgirls, Laura gets hooked on the slot machines, Linda and Richard flaunt their wealth, and Ted temporarily becomes a high roller but loses it all. Guest Stars: Walter Olkewicz (Stan), Mark Lonow (Marty), Carmine Caridi (Fred)
12	"In Vegas ... With Showgirls!: Part 2"	Arlene Sanford	Tom Walla & Charlene Seeger	November 19, 1989	40263–066
Ted creates such a disturbance at the casino that the owner tries to put a hit on him, so he, Linda and Richard dress up like showgirls to make their escape. Guest Stars: Mark Lonow (Marty), Carmine Caridi (Fred), Gina Raymond (Tina), Harry Johnson (The Reporter), James Edson (The Announcer)
13	"Parade of Homes"	Dwayne Hickman	Hollis Rich	November 26, 1989	40263–067
Everyone hopes to host Mr. McSwain's new TV show, but the job goes to Geneva, whom Ted bribes to give him additional promotion. Guest Stars: Arleen Sorkin (Geneva), Laurie Faso (Delivery Man)
14	"Bye, Bye Boris"	David Semel	Ruth Bennett	January 7, 1990	40263–068
Margo's coworkers reluctantly offer support when her beloved cat dies, which includes not only a funeral but a seance. Guest Stars: Mary Hamill (The Woman), Freddy (Francine); Note: He was credited for one additional episode, but this is the final appearance of Chris Lemmon as Richard Phillips.
15	"Who Framed Roger McSwain?"	Phillip Charles MacKenzie	Tom Walla & Charlene Seeger	January 14, 1990	40263–069
Linda suspects Mr. McSwain's new fiancee has dubious intentions, so the ladies investigate her and discover she's had multiple marriages to wealthy men. Guest Star: Debra Sandlund (Chloe), Jeff Silverman (The Clerk)
16	"An Unmarried Woman"	Sam Weisman	Barry Vigon, Deborah Leschin & Bruce Ferber	February 4, 1990	40263–070
After Richard leaves her for a flight attendant named Pippy, Linda finds herself in a group therapy session and is taken aback when Ted makes a late arrival. He agrees to keep her secret, but their coworkers make it difficult, as Laura plans a surprise anniversary party for Richard and Linda. Guest Stars: Lyman Ward (Dr. Parker), Jeff Garlin (Brian), Rebeccah Bush (Sherry), Allan Fudge (Jeff)
17	"The Bad Seed"	Arlene Sanford	Ruth Bennett & Susan Seeger	February 11, 1990	40263–072
Mr. McSwain's daughter Chloe arrives from Australia and quickly puts the moves on every man in the office. As the staff scrambles to protect the boss, Chloe clashes with Linda and sets her sights on getting Ted into bed. Guest Star: Sherrie Krenn (aka Sherrié Austin) (Chloe McSwain)
18	"Lost Weekend"	Arlene Sanford	Dava Savel	February 18, 1990	40263–073
Margo makes arrangements and invites herself along on Linda's and Laura's single cruise, but she goofed and they find themselves aboard a cruise for mourners who are dropping the remains of their loved ones in the sea. Meanwhile, the guys go on a war games retreat in which Ted is literally tortured by his nemesis. Guest Stars: Jay Thomas (Evan Gimble), Rick Lieberman (Fred), Ralph Bruneau (Greg) Rod McCary (Ernie), George O. Petrie (Lester)
19	"Dumbstruck"	Michael Zinberg	Bruce Ferber & Charlene Seeger	February 25, 1990	40263–071
Ted become concerned when Linda has a torrid romance with a hunky young moving man, so she throws a dinner party to show her coworkers that everything's fine, but it further proves that the couple is incompatible. Guest Stars: Tom Silardi (Bobby), Perrey Reeves (Vicki), Robin Greer (The Moving Lady)
20	"Brother, Can You Spare a Grand?"	Michael Zinberg	Scott Gorden	March 18, 1990	40263–074
Margo's conman brother comes into the office and tries to swindle Ted and Linda, not knowing that Margo has pooled an investment with them. Guest Stars: Ted Shackelford (Peter Van Meter), Sal Viscuso (Ray); Note: Sal Viscuso previously appeared on Duet as Richard's sleazy coworker whom Laura slept with.
21	"New Kid in Town"	David Semel	Barry Vigon, Deborah Leschin, Tom Walla	April 1, 1990	40263–075
When McSwain hires a teenager, the staff initially thinks it's a joke, but they soon realize that the boy's a legitimate threat. Guest Stars: Chance Quinn (Lawrence R. Foxworth), Marcia Rodd (Mrs. Perry), Mark L. Taylor (Terry), J.J. (Officer Nanas), Ben Cleaveland (Scooter)
22	"The Real Estate Thing"	David Semel	Tom Walla & Bruce Ferber	April 8, 1990	40263–076
Ted becomes jealous when sleazy nemesis Even Gimble (Jay Thomas) tries to lure Linda away to his agency. Guest Stars: Paul Kreppel (The Waiter), Robert Alan Beuth (The Client)
23	"The Roast"	Philip Charles MacKenzie	Deborah Leschin, Barry Vigon, Charlene Seeger	April 29, 1990	40263–078
Ted's 10th anniversary celebration turns into a wake when his plane vanishes. Guest Star: Sandy the Dog (Warren)
24	"First Impression"	David Semel	Deborah Leschin, Barry Vigon, Charlene Seeger	May 6, 1990	40263–077
Scott's birthday party is teeming with celebrity impersonators. Ted and Linda pursue a romance. Guest Stars: Sandy Simpson (John), Betsy Randle (Dana), David Shawn Michaels (Monique/Milton White), Janice Hart (Joan Rivers), Karen Salkin (Lucille Ball), Jamie Alcroft (Robin Leach), Greg Travis (Jack Nicholson), Ellis Levinson (Jerry Lewis)
