= John J. York =

American actor (born 1958)

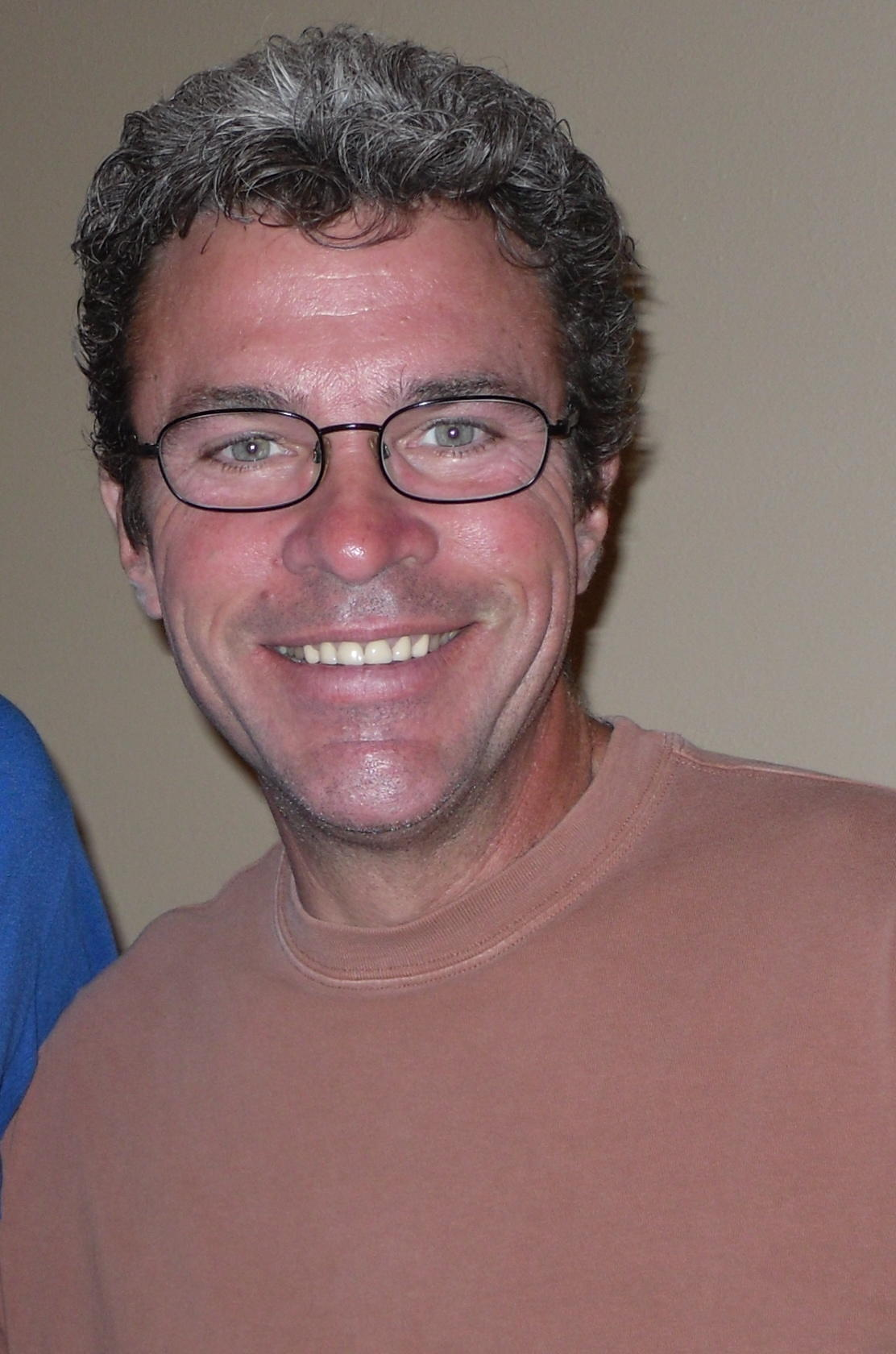
- York in 2010
- Born: John Joseph Robert York; December 10, 1958 (age 67); Chicago, Illinois, U.S.
- Occupation: Actor
- Years active: 1983–present
- Children: 1

John Joseph Robert York (born December 10, 1958) is an American actor. Although he has made appearances on such television shows as Dynasty, Family Ties, and 21 Jump Street, he is most recognizable for playing the role of Malcolm "Mac" Scorpio on the daytime soap opera General Hospital.

== Background ==
York was born in Chicago, Illinois, where he attended Brother Rice Christian Brothers High School. He is the fifth of six children. His second-longest running role (after General Hospital) was as college student Eric Cord on the Fox network television series Werewolf. He co-starred in the Nickelodeon made-for-TV film Drake & Josh Go Hollywood, and in an episode of Wizards of Waverly Place.

== Personal life ==
Brought up as a Catholic, York moved to California from Chicago in the 1980s. He has been married to Vickie Manners since 1986. They have a daughter.

== Filmography ==
=== Film ===
Year	Title	Role	Notes
1984	Chattanooga Choo Choo	Mickey	Uncredited
1984	The Bear	Manning	
1986	Night of the Creeps	Todd	
1987	House of the Rising Sun	James	
1991	Steel and Lace	Craig	
2004	The Eavesdropper	Grant Kane	
2013	By God's Grace	David Hanson	
2016	The Last Heist	Sinclair	
2016	Dear Diary I Died	Keith	
2017	Distortion	Jeffrey Walters	
2018	Resolution Song	Steve	
2018	The Sinister Surrogate	Detective Logan	
TBA	Chasing Nightmares	Doctor Bender	

=== Television ===
Year	Title	Role	Notes
1983	Listen to Your Heart	Steve	Television film
1983	Dynasty	Workman	Episode: "The Proposal"
1983–1986	Hotel	Alan O'Connor / Tim Fiedler / Tony Fanzo	3 episodes
1986	Hunter	Robert Kephardt	Episode: "True Confessions"
1987	Newhart	New Cute Guy in Town	Episode: "Jail, Jail, the Gang's All Here"
1987–1988	Werewolf	Eric Cord	29 episodes
1989	Family Ties	Matthews	Episode: "Basic Training"
1989	Murder, She Wrote	Jonas Holt	Episode: "Fire Burn, Cauldron Bubble"
1989	Thunderboat Row	Lon Otto	Television film
1990	21 Jump Street	Keith Taylor	Episode: "Unfinished Business"
1990	Sydney	Derek	Episode: "On a Claire Day"
1991–present	General Hospital	Mac Scorpio	647 episodes
1996	Closer and Closer	B.J. Conners	Television film
1997, 1998	Clueless	Mr. Mazza	2 episodes
1997–2001	Port Charles	Mac Scorpio	60 episodes
2001	All My Children	Mac Scorpio	Episode #1.8194
2002	Even Stevens	Barry Hudson Jr.	Episode: "Hardly Famous"
2003	One on One	Dave Smith	Episode: "I Hear White People"
2004	Veronica Mars	Randall	Episode: "The Girl Next Door"
2005	My Wife and Kids	Guy	Episode: "Graduation Day"
2006	Drake & Josh Go Hollywood	Milo McCrary	Television film
2007–2008	General Hospital: Night Shift	Mac Scorpio	6 episodes
2011	Wizards of Waverly Place	Game Show Host	Episode: "Misfortune at the Beach"
2011–2012	Pound Puppies	Buford / Brutus / Bus Driver	3 episodes
2013	Castle	Interviewer	Episode: "Time Will Tell"
2014	Acting Dead	Tennyson Albright	2 episodes
