= Las Vegas Entertainer of the Year =

Award from Entertainment Consumers Exchange

Since 2001, the Entertainment Consumers Exchange membership selects the Las Vegas Entertainer of the Year. Entertainment Consumers Exchange is a national non-profit organization for fans and their favorites in entertainment.

Year	Las Vegas Entertainer of the Year
1992:	Jahna Steele
1993:	Darren Stuart
1994:	Rich Fonde
1995:	Mike Davis
1996:	???
1997:	???
1998:	Danny Gans
1999:	Danny Gans
2000:	Danny Gans
2001:	Danny Gans
2002:	Danny Gans
2003:	Danny Gans
2004:	Danny Gans
2005:	Danny Gans
2006:	Danny Gans
2007:	Danny Gans
2008:	Danny Gans
2009:	???
2010:	???
2011:	???
2012:	Rich Fonde
2013:	Mark OToole
