= Jahna Steele =

American transgender entertainer and Las Vegas showgirl

- Born: September 29, 1958; San Antonio, Texas
- Died: January 24, 2008 (aged 49); Las Vegas, Nevada
- Occupation: entertainer

Jahna Erica Steele (September 29, 1958 — January 24, 2008) was an American transgender entertainer and Las Vegas showgirl who was voted Las Vegas' "Sexiest Showgirl on The Strip" in 1991, "Las Vegas Entertainer of the Year, 1992", and "Most Beautiful Showgirl, 1993". She was fired after being outed as a trans woman by a tabloid television show. Steele made numerous film and television appearances, including hosting a transgender beauty pageant featured in the film Trantasia.

== Early life and career ==
Jahna Erica Steele was born on September 29, 1958, in San Antonio, Texas. Steele began her transition at the age of 17, and underwent gender-affirming surgery, also known as sex reassignment surgery, when she was 20. Steele was a Miss Gay USA pageant winner in the Texas finals under the name Jahonau Reis. Following her surgery, she left San Antonio and moved to Las Vegas, Nevada. She later changed her name legally to Jahonau Erica Steele. She joined the cast of the Crazy Girls Revue at the Riviera in Las Vegas during the late 1980s. In 1991, Steele was voted "the sexiest showgirl on The Strip".

== Outing and its effects ==
Most people in Las Vegas, including the producer who hired her and her costars, "knew she was transgender but didn't care." She was outed on a 1992 edition of the television program A Current Affair. Following her outing, people began questioning Jahna's womanhood and asking if she was a girl, to which she'd reply, "Well, last time I looked, for the past 25 years." The story of her outing and its negative effect on her showgirl career was featured in The National Enquirer.

After being fired from Crazy Girls Revue, Steele was a frequent talk show guest and sang in nightclubs across the United States before moving to Hawaii. She also appeared as a guest star in a second-season episode of NYPD Blue ("Don We Now Our Gay Apparel"), playing the character Candace La Rue. Steele was additionally on the Maury Povich Show in the early 1990s. Following her outing as being a transgender woman, she received much publicity leading her to be on various talk shows such as the Maury Show. When asked about her experience on the show, Steele stated, "...[the show] it was much more based on education and kindness. Now it's about exploitation and freakism, and like, 'We fooled you. Hardy-har-har. This is a man.' Which is just so insulting to somebody who's lived such a distressful life, because it's not easy growing up with a gender-identity disorder."

Steele later returned to school, saying "[I] learned how to do things other than entertaining so that I’d have something to fall back on." She enrolled in computer courses, then worked for United Blood Services and a women's health facility, and became certified in nonprofit management. Before her death, she began hosting Aleman's La Cage drag show at the Riviera, and it was her last job before overdosing in January 2008.

== Transsexual beauty contest hostess ==
Steele made her comeback in 2004 when she hosted The World's Most Beautiful Transsexual Contest at the Riviera. A documentary feature film based on the pageant, Trantasia, recognized Steele's pioneering place in the history of the transsexual community. Steele was also featured on several segments of Entertainment Tonight in connection with Trantasia. Following the success of the film, Steele continued her singing career and was the spokesperson for Tingari Skin Care System. Steele was working on her "kiss-and-tell" autobiography, Always a Lady, when she died in Las Vegas. The cause of death was accidental overdose of cocaine, morphine, and hydromorphone.

== Controversy ==
There is some controversy over Steele's career, particularly regarding the Riviera. Jahna was hired by show producer Norbert Aleman, and she quickly became the star of Crazy Girls Revue. Aleman and Steele's co-show girl performers knew she was transgender. However, when Steele's trans identity was outed, Aleman fired her because Crazy Girls was an "über-straight topless revue" and that did not include trans women. Several years later due to the public attention toward the transgender community, Aleman brought Steele back to host The World's Most Beautiful Transsexual Contest at the Riviera. The show went on to be documented and star Steele in Trantasia filmed by Jeremy Stanford.
