= Chris Lemmon =

American actor and author (born 1954)

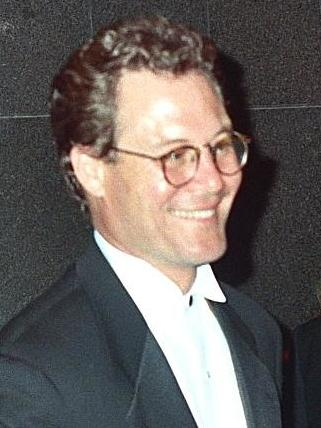
- Lemmon in 1990
- Born: Christopher Boyd Lemmon; June 22, 1954 (age 71); Los Angeles, California, U.S.
- Occupations: Actor; author
- Years active: 1977–present
- Spouse: Gina Raymond (m. 1988)
- Children: 3, including Sydney Lemmon
- Parents: Jack Lemmon; Cynthia Stone

Christopher Boyd Lemmon (born June 22, 1954) is an American actor and author.

== Early life and education ==
Lemmon was born in Los Angeles, California, the son of actress Cynthia Stone and actor Jack Lemmon. Lemmon attended the Verde Valley School in Sedona, Arizona. With a talent for music, he was encouraged by his father to study piano. Lemmon considered playing piano professionally after having graduated from the California Institute of the Arts, with degrees in classical piano and composition, and in theater.

== Career ==
He appeared as an actor in numerous stage productions, including the west-coast tour of Barefoot in the Park, directed by Jerry Paris, the original West coast production of Shay by Anne Commire, and A. R. Gurney's Love Letters with Stephanie Zimbalist. He portrayed Richard Phillips in two situation comedies, Duet (1987) and Open House (1989), and also co-starred as Martin "Bru" Brubaker in the television series Thunder in Paradise alongside American professional wrestler Hulk Hogan. Lemmon is also a screenwriter and producer. Algonquin Books published Lemmon's tribute to his father, titled A Twist of Lemmon (2006), which was re-released in 2008 as a paperback by Applause Theatre and Cinema Books.

He appeared in three films with his father: Airport '77 (1977), That's Life! (1986), and Dad (1989).

Lemmon adapted his tribute to his father, A Twist of Lemmon to the stage in 2015. The show, which Lemmon has performed all around the United States, follows the relationship between Lemmon and his father as seen through his father's eyes.

== Personal life ==
Lemmon has been married to actress Gina Raymond since 1988. They reside in Connecticut and have three children.

=== Health issues ===
On December 19, 2018, after an article was published several weeks prior in The San Diego Union-Tribune, Lemmon confirmed on Facebook that he had recently undergone a double-lung transplant due to idiopathic pulmonary fibrosis and was recovering.

== Filmography ==
=== Film ===
- Airport '77 (1977)
- Just Tell Me You Love Me (1980)
- The Happy Hooker Goes Hollywood (1980)
- Seems Like Old Times (1980)
- C.O.D. (1981)
- Just Before Dawn (1981)
- Uncommon Valor (1983)
- Swing Shift (1984)
- Cannonball Run II (1984)
- Yellow Pages (1985)
- That's Life! (1986)
- Weekend Warriors (1986)
- Dad (1989)
- Corporate Affairs (1990)
- Lena's Holiday (1991)
- Firehead (1991)
- Thunder in Paradise (1993)
- Thunder in Paradise II (1994)
- Thunder in Paradise III (1995)
- Wishmaster (1997)
- Best of the Best 4: Without Warning (1998)
- Land of the Free (1999)
- Just the Ticket (1999)
- Blonde (2022)

=== Television ===
- Brothers and Sisters (1979)
- Mirror, Mirror (1979)
- CHiPs (1981)
- Too Close for Comfort (1981)
- 9 to 5 (1983)
- Fantasy (1982)
- The Outlaws (1984)
- Duet (1987–89)
- Open House (1989)
- Knots Landing (1990)
- The Match Game (1990)
- Into the Night (1991)
- The Joint Is Jumpin' (1993)
- Thunder in Paradise (1994) (22 episodes)
- Basic Values: Sex, Shock & Censorship in the 90's (1993)
- The Pretender (1998)
- Magic Time: A Tribute to Jack Lemmon (2002)
- The Hollywood Greats (Jack Lemmon) (2006)
- 50 Films to See Before You Die (2006)
