= A Twist of Lemmon =

2006 book by Christopher Lemmon

- Author: Christopher Lemmon
- Original title: A Twist of Lemmon: A Tribute to My Father
- Language: English
- Subject: Jack Lemmon
- Genre: Memoir
- Published: 2006
- Publisher: Algonquin Books
- Publication place: United States
- ISBN: 9781557837394

A Twist of Lemmon: A Tribute to My Father is a memoir-styled book concerning the life of famed American actor Jack Lemmon, as viewed through the eyes of his son, Christopher Lemmon. The book was published in May 2006 by Algonquin Books, and features a foreword by Kevin Spacey, who credits Jack Lemmon with his pursuit of acting. It was adapted into a play with Christopher Lemmon playing the role of his father.
