= Duet (TV series) =

American television sitcom

- Genre: Sitcom
- Created by: Ruth Bennett; Susan Seeger
- Written by: Ruth Bennett; Bruce Ferber; Lisa Medway; John Peaslee; Judd Pillot; Susan Seeger; Michael Zinberg
- Directed by: Peter Baldwin; Gabrielle Beaumont; Lee Shallat-Chemel; Arlene Sanford; David Steinberg; Michael Zinberg; Stephen Zuckerman
- Starring: Matthew Laurance; Mary Page Keller; Chris Lemmon; Alison LaPlaca
- Theme music composer: Buddy Budson
- Composer: John Beasley
- Country of origin: United States
- Original language: English
- No. of seasons: 3
- No. of episodes: 54

Production
- Producer: Linda Nieber
- Running time: 30 minutes
- Production companies: Ubu Productions; Paramount Television

Original release
- Network: Fox
- Release: April 19, 1987 – May 7, 1989

Related
- Open House

Duet is an American sitcom that aired on Fox from April 19, 1987, to May 7, 1989. Originally, the story centered on the romance of a novelist (Matthew Laurance) and a caterer (Mary Page Keller), but gradually the focus shifted to their yuppie friends (Chris Lemmon, Alison LaPlaca) and the show was rebranded as Open House. The series was created by Ruth Bennett and Susan Seeger, and was produced by Paramount Television.

== Synopsis ==
Ben Coleman is a struggling mystery novelist, while his girlfriend Laura Kelly is a caterer with her younger sister Jane (Jodi Thelen). Richard and Linda Phillips were a high-powered yuppie couple. He was in the family patio-furniture business and she was a studio executive. Linda's boss at World Wide Studios was Cooper Hayden (Larry Poindexter), who eventually became infatuated with Jane. Richard later quit his job to become a professional pianist. Geneva (Arleen Sorkin) was the Phillipses' wisecracking, sexy maid who sometimes fraternized with the sisters.

Near the end of season 2, Linda gave birth to a daughter, Amanda. When the show returned for season 3, Amanda was now a four-year-old (Ginger Orsi). Also at the start of season 3 Ben and Laura had married, and Linda lost her job at World Wide Studios. Linda then sought a partnership in Laura's catering business. Just prior to the end of that season, Linda met real estate mogul Ted Nichols, played by guest star and LaPlaca's then-boyfriend, Philip Charles MacKenzie. Ted schmoozed her into joining his realty firm, selling upscale properties to snobs just like herself.

When the show returned for a 4th season, it was now retitled Open House, and was centered around Linda and Ted. The characters of Laura, Richard, Amanda and Geneva all returned for Open House, but Amanda and Geneva were written out after only a few episodes. Eventually so was Richard. The spin-off lasted for one season.

== Production ==
The series was among the first to appear on the Fox network when they launched a Sunday night prime-time TV lineup in 1987, alongside Married... with Children, The Tracey Ullman Show and Mr. President. Loosely based on the love lives of creators Bennett and Seeger, the show was originally noted for being serialized, with events unfolding in succession from week to week.

Matthew Laurance was the first actor hired, but they couldn't find a leading lady that sparked with him in Los Angeles, so they held auditions in New York, where they finally found Mary Page Keller. Keller and Jodi Thelen met at the audition and had such an instantaneous sisterly rapport that they were both cast within days. Alison LaPlaca was originally hired to appear as the undefined wife of a supporting character in two episodes, but a pregnancy was written into the next script, requiring her to stick around. Acting wasn't Chris Lemmon's primary career goal—he had studied extensively as a pianist—but his musical dreams and abilities were eventually utilized in the show.

There was a period of adjustment as the actors became familiar with one another, but once things began to click, there was a fun atmosphere on the set, and little interference from the network. Susan Seeger got her whole family into the act, with brother David and their famous father Hal Seeger creating the opening title sequence, sister Mindy portraying Ben's publicist Nina, and sister Charbie Dahl (aka Charlene Seeger) writing a few of the scripts.

Although the first season focused squarely on Ben and Laura, season two became an ensemble with ongoing stories revolving around Jane, Richard, and Linda. As the meaning of the show's title blurred, Fox tried to spin it in promotion claiming, "Duet means two, so why is it about five people, a dog, and a baby? Because it's a show you shouldn't watch alone!" By the third season, Fox executives began forcing changes. Noticing the popularity of Alison LaPlaca's character, they pushed Ben, Laura, and Jane into the background as stories became exclusively centered on Linda and Richard. They also flashed ahead three years so they could turn the Phillipses daughter into a talking toddler, which was proving popular with audiences on ABC's Full House. The Phillipses also eclipsed the newlywed Colemans in the network's promotion.

The theme music over the opening titles was composed by Buddy Budson, and in the first two seasons performed by Ursula Walker and Tony Franklin.

Beginning in season two, the opening titles changed to begin featuring clips of the characters in scenes from the show. These were book-ended by the show's title appearing in gold on a maroon leather-textured photo album cover, which opened to reveal the series of episode clips, and the photo album closing, with creators Ruth Bennett and Susan Seeger being credited in gold on the album cover. (In season one, the show title was displayed over the beginning of the opening scene.) In season three, the same sequence style remained, but the theme music was rearranged into a complete saxophone/electric guitar instrumental, with the instruments taking the place of the notes sung by vocalists Walker and Franklin.

== Cast ==
- Matthew Laurance as Ben Coleman
- Mary Page Keller as Laura Kelly
- Jodi Thelen as Jane Kelly
- Chris Lemmon as Richard Phillips
- Alison La Placa as Linda Phillips
- Larry Poindexter as Cooper Hayden
- Arleen Sorkin as Geneva
- Ginger Orsi as Amanda Phillips
- Bo as Reuben, Ben's dog (live animal actor)

== Broadcast history ==
Season	Time
1986–87	Sunday at 9:00 pm (Episode 1); Sunday at 9:30 pm (Episodes 2–4, 8); Sunday at 8:30 pm (Episodes 5–7, 9–13)
1987–88	Saturday at 9:30 pm (Episodes 1–4); Sunday at 9:30 pm (Episodes 5–21); Sunday at 10:00 pm (Episode 22)
1988–89	Sunday at 10:00 pm

== Episodes ==
=== Series overview ===
Season	Episodes	Originally released	
Season	Episodes	First released	Last released
1	13	April 19, 1987	June 28, 1987
2	22	September 26, 1987	July 10, 1988
3	19	October 30, 1988	May 7, 1989

=== Season 1 (1987) ===
Note: Many of the titles that appear on-screen differ from those found in TV listings. Only the first season featured on-screen title cards, as well as music-themed names.

No. overall	No. in season	Title	Directed by	Written by	Original release date	Prod. code	Rating/share (households)
1	1	"Prelude"	David Steinberg	Ruth Bennett & Susan Seeger	April 19, 1987	40263–001	4.5/7
Ben is dazed when he glimpses Laura, who looks exactly like his fantasy girl from the detective novel he's been writing. Meanwhile, Laura caters her ex-boyfriend's wedding, but she has to contend with his leering and his new bride's insecurities. Note: Alison LaPlaca (Linda) does not appear in this episode. Guest Stars: Laurie Walters (Amanda), Robert Prescott (Kevin), Diane Robin (Bonnie)
2	2	"Overture"	David Steinberg	Ruth Bennett	April 19, 1987	40263–002	N/A
Ben gets roped into buffering Richard and Linda on their wedding anniversary while simultaneously trying to have his first date with Laura. Guest Stars: Robert Prescott (Kevin), Laurie Walters (Amanda), Murphy Dunne (Owen), Mitzi Hoag (Mrs. Stevenson), Oliver Muirhead (Waiter), James MacNerland (Stockboy), Diane Robin (Bonnie)
3	3	"Adagio"	David Steinberg	John Peaslee & Judd Pillot	April 26, 1987	40263–003	N/A
Ben wants to rush into a relationship, but Laura tries to pump the brakes, fearing she's repeating unhealthy patterns that will lead to heartbreak. Also Known As: "Not a Date"
4	4	"Variations on a Theme"	Michael Zinberg	Susan Seeger	May 3, 1987	40263–004	N/A
Ben and Laura's first time having sex is not all that they'd hoped for, so they decide to repeat things until they get it right.
5	5	"Dissonance"	Peter Baldwin	Bob Brush	May 10, 1987	40263–005	N/A
Laura throws a dinner party to celebrate Ben finishing his book, "Death in the Fast Lane," but she becomes miffed when he won't let her read it. Guest Star: Rebecca Staples (Aerobics Instructor); Also Known As: "Murdoch Exposed"
6	6	"Lullaby"	Arlene Sanford	John Peaslee & Judd Pillot	May 17, 1987	40263–009	N/A
Linda invites Laura and Ben to dinner because she wants to confide in someone about her pregnancy. Guest Star: Arleen Sorkin (Geneva); Also Known As: "Ensemble"
7	7	"Fugue"	Peter Baldwin	Susan Seeger	May 24, 1987	40263–007	N/A
Laura becomes jealous when Ben lets his ex stay at his apartment. Guest stars: Jamie Rose (Rachel West); Also Known As: "Old Old Old Friend"
8	8	"Resolution"	Michael Zinberg	Ruth Bennett	May 24, 1987	40263–008	N/A
Laura is so furious with Ben that she calls up an old flame, who only reminds her how much she cares for Ben. Guest stars: Jamie Rose (Rachel West), Stephen Meadows (Jack Spenser); Also Known As: "Interlude"
9	9	"Liebestraum"	Arlene Sanford	Lisa Medway	May 31, 1987	40263–010	N/A
Laura panics when Ben says, "I love you," so he decides to take her on a romantic weekend getaway, but Richard and Linda tag along. Meanwhile, Jane feeds Rueben Chinese food, which disagrees with the pooch. Guest Star: Grant Heslov (Clerk)
10	10	"Work in Progress"	Michael Zinberg	Bruce Ferber	June 7, 1987	40263–011	N/A
Laura gets tied up with work leaving Ben, Richard, and Linda waiting at a restaurant for seven hours. Meanwhile, Jane has a flirtation with Simon, Laura's new employee. Guest Stars: Steven Tash (Simon), Robert Covarrubias (Waiter), Mark Bennett (Mr. Fischer)
11	11	"Elegy"	Gabrielle Beaumont	John Peaslee & Judd Pillot	June 14, 1987	40263–006	N/A
When Ben accompanies Laura and Jane to their aunt's funeral, he loses his wallet in the coffin, and Laura realizes that her entire family is crazy. Guest Stars: Lisa Jane Persky (Mary-Margaret), K Callan (Rose Kelly), Summer Phoenix (Molly Kelly), Mark Bringleson (Carl), Reid Shelton (Frank Kelly), Nick Segal (Brother Michael); Also Known As: "The Long Goodbye"
12	12	"Trio"	Arlene Sanford	Ruth Bennett	June 21, 1987	40263–012	N/A
Laura finds it difficult to live in both her apartment and Ben's so he suggests that they should move in together. Guest Star: Steven Tash (Simon)
13	13	"Passage"	Bruce Zinberg	Michael Ferber	June 28, 1987	40263–013	N/A
Laura's insecurities about her relationship result in her inability to choose a home to live in with Ben, so he breaks up with her. Meanwhile, Jane finds a new apartment of her own. Guest Stars: Steven Tash (Simon)

=== Season 2 (1987–1988) ===
No. overall	No. in season	Title	Directed by	Written by	Original release date	Prod. code	Rating/share (households)
14	1	"Apart"	Michael Zinberg	Ruth Bennett	September 26, 1987	40263–014	2.0
While Laura goes on a drinking binge, Ben attempts to get on with his life as a successful author, Jane moves into her new pad, and Richard cheers up his pregnant wife with a new Mercedes. Guest Stars: Mindy Seeger (Nina Giraldi), Joshua Cadman (Steve Maloney), Stanley Brock (The Bartender), Mark Venturini (Eddie), Michael Gregory (Don), Mark Phelan (Jack); Note: Beginning with this episode, Fox scheduled the show on Saturday nights. An original network promo featuring Ben and Rueben boasted that viewers could watch Duet immediately following NBC's high-rated The Golden Girls, but they opted to watch Amen instead, so the show returned to Sunday nights a month later.
15	2	"You're Nobody 'Til Somebody Leaves You"	Michael Zinberg	Judd Pillot & John Peaslee	October 3, 1987	40263–016	1.9
Laura continues her drunken bender at Richard and Linda's house, much to their chagrin. Meanwhile, Ben's star is on the rise, and new publicist Nina books him for an appearance on Rona Barrett's talk show. Guest stars: Arleen Sorkin (Geneva), Rona Barrett (Herself), Robert Costanzo (Cab Driver), Mindy Seeger (Nina Giraldi), Kirk Scott (Voice of The Bottle), Susan Davis (Voice of TV Guest); Note: This is the first show in which Laura talks to an alcohol bottle voiced by Kirk Scott (Heathers), who later appeared on-screen as a member of Alcoholics Anonymous.
16	3	"The Cower of Love"	Arlene Sanford	Sheree Guitar	October 10, 1987	40263–015	3.8
Laura blows up over Ben's public comments about her. Later, realizing the pain she's caused everyone, she apologizes and visits a psychiatrist. Guest Stars: Arleen Sorkin (Geneva), Mindy Seeger (Nina Giraldi), Norman Parker (Dr. Canter), Kirk Scott (Voice of The Bottle)
17	4	"Lots of Things Happen"	Arlene Sanford	Bruce Ferber	October 17, 1987	40263–017	3.0
Richard throws a 30th birthday party for Linda, not realizing that her coworkers don't know she's pregnant. Laura plans to reconcile with Ben but has the wind knocked out of her sails when he arrives at the party with his publicist on his arm. Also, Jane makes a dazzling impression on Cooper, Linda's boss. Guest Stars: Arleen Sorkin (Geneva), Mindy Seeger (Nina Giraldi), Norman Parker (Dr. Canter), Larry Poindexter (Cooper Hayden), Sal Viscuso (Stan Miller)
18	5	"Strange Bedfellows"	Arlene Sanford	Susan Seeger	October 25, 1987	40263–018	2.9
Laura awakens horrified to discover she slept with Richard's obnoxious coworker. Nina decides to break things off with Ben. Mrs. Kelly visits Jane but concludes that there's not enough room to stay in her apartment, so she imposes herself on Laura. Guest Stars: Mindy Seeger (Nina Giraldi), K Callan (Rose Kelly), Norman Parker (Dr. Canter), Sal Viscuso (Stan Miller)
19	6	"Satin Doll"	Michael Zinberg	Bruce Ferber	November 1, 1987	40263–019	3.0
During an unusual dinner party at Jane's apartment, Cooper gets the idea to adapt Ben's novel as a film, but he hires Electra, a loony pop star, to play Laura's role. Guest Stars: Wendy Schaal (Electra), Larry Poindexter (Cooper Hayden), Norman Parker (Dr. Canter), Joshua Cadman (Steve Maloney), Mark Venturini (Eddie), Kirk Scott (Bill W.)
20	7	"Jane's Getting Serious"	Arlene Sanford	Judd Pillot & John Peaslee	November 8, 1987	40263–021	2.6
When Cooper asks Jane her opinion on two scripts, Linda tries to push her own project, "The Prom of the Dead 2." Meanwhile, Ben moves into Laura's apartment but has trouble letting go of his stuff. Guest Stars: Larry Poindexter (Cooper Hayden), Joshua Cadman (Steve Maloney), Jonathan Brandis (Danny), Lynnie Godfrey (Voice of Roberta)
21	8	"I Never Played for My Father: Part 1"	Arlene Sanford	J. David Shapiro	November 15, 1987	40263–024	3.2
Richard realizes he's dissatisfied in the family's patio furniture business and would rather be a pianist, but he has trouble working up the nerve to tell his father. Guest Stars: Arleen Sorkin (Geneva), Larry Poindexter (Cooper Hayden), Liz Torres (Mrs. Doyle), Raye Birk (Vladimir Horowitz), Robert Reed (Jim Phillips)
22	9	"I Never Played for My Father: Part 2"	Arlene Sanford	Bruce Ferber, Judd Pillot & John Peaslee	November 22, 1987	40263–025	2.7
Linda is not happy to learn that Richard quit his job, but she decides to be supportive of his dream. Also, Ben wins an award for his novel but he neglects to thank Laura. Guest Stars: Arleen Sorkin (Geneva), Larry Poindexter (Cooper Hayden), Whitman Mayo (Smokey), Bert Hinchman (Mr. Turner), Claudio Lonow (Ms. Taylor), Robert Reed (Jim Phillips)
23	10	"Born, Bred and Buttered in Brooklyn"	Arlene Sanford	Ruth Bennett	November 29, 1987	40263–022	2.5
Ben and Laura visit his parents in Brooklyn and discover they've sold the family's home. Meanwhile, Jane'a dance lessons result in the destruction of Linda's ceiling. Guest Stars: Larry Poindexter (Cooper Hayden), Bette Ford (Barbara Coleman), Mark Carlton (Ernest the Bum), Allan Arbus (Nate Coleman)
24	11	"Fatal Distraction"	Arlene Sanford	Susan Seeger	December 13, 1987	40263–023	3.0
After Laura runs into Nina, Ben becomes convinced that he's living a real-life "Fatal Attraction," although there's a less sinister explanation for the recent telephone hang-ups. Meanwhile, Linda's eating has spiraled out of control, so Geneva intervenes - for a price. Guest Stars: Arleen Sorkin (Geneva), Mindy Seeger (Nina Giraldi)
25	12	"A Hero is Just a Sandwich"	Arlene Sanford	Charlene Seeger	January 17, 1988	40263–026	2.1
Ben agrees to collaborate on a novel with his mentor, but he finds himself doing all the work. Guest Stars: Anthony Newley (Jake M. Scott), James MacNerland (1976 Airport Voice Over), Richard Morof (Voice of the Publisher), Rebecca Staples (Female Airport Voice Over)
26	13	"The Package"	Arlene Sanford	Judd Pillot & John Peaslee	January 24, 1988	40263–027	4.2
Geneva's old boyfriend breaks out of jail and entrusts her with a bag of stolen diamonds. Guest Stars: Arleen Sorkin (Geneva), David Marciano (Charlie), Thalmus Rasulala (Lance), Rick Lieberman (Jack)
27	14	"Baby Talk"	Arlene Sanford	Sheree Guitar	February 7, 1988	40263–028	2.3
Richard asks Laura to throw a baby shower, but horomonol Linda isn't happy when she learns the idea was her husband's. Also, Ben ribs Laura over a laundry room mixup that resulted in a neighbor fleeing with her underwear. Guest Stars: Arleen Sorkin (Geneva), Lycia Naff (Natalie)
28	15	"Funny Valentine"	Arlene Sanford	Judd Pillot & John Peaslee	February 14, 1988	40263–030	2.8
Richard and Ben get stranded with a flat tire on Valentine's Day, leaving Linda and Laura waiting with a chatty entertainer. But Jane takes the award for the worst evening when she announces Cooper broke up with her. Guest Star: Richard Sanders (Bob); Note: This is a clip show. The credits feature Kirk Scott and Grant Heslov, who only appeared in flashback.
29	16	"The Candidate"	Lee Shallat Chemel	Ruth Bennett	February 21, 1988	40263–031	3.1
Richard and Linda throw a party for a Presidential candidate who corners Laura and makes unwanted advances. A reporter informs her that it's a pattern and urges Laura to be a whistleblower, but his wife makes an emotional plea for her silence. Guest Stars: Barry Jenner (Senator Jim Grath), Dorothy Fielding (Joan Grath), Ken Lerner (Alan Morris; Note: This episode debuts a revised opening credit sequence that includes clips from earlier episodes.
30	17	"Special Delivery"	Arlene Sanford	Bruce Ferber	February 28, 1988	40263–029	3.7
Linda goes into labor during a game of charades and winds up sharing a hospital room with two other ladies, one of whom is an obnoxiously perky mother of nine, so she goes AWOL for a shopping spree in the gift shop. Guest Stars: Arleen Sorkin (Geneva), Dody Goodman (Helen), May Quigley (Janice Hillman), Mary Farrell (Emily), Sab Shimono (Dr. Nashita), Khandi Alexander (Nurse)
31	18	"Oh My God, I Left the Baby on the Bus"	Arlene Sanford	John Peaslee & Judd Pillot	March 6, 1988	40263–032	4.4
Linda can't enjoy shopping for new clothes thanks to the pregnancy weight gain, so she returns home to find Richard has taken his poker buddies out for lunch, leaving newborn Amanda alone. Also, Steve has a flirtation with a waitress and considers having an affair. Guest Stars: Joshua Cadman (Steve Maloney), David Allen Grier (Gordon), Lenora May (Holly), Eve Smith (Old Woman in Department Store); Note: Beginning with this episode, Fox began running a minute-long recap of the show's main characters prior to the start of the show. Also beginning with this episode, the closing credits change from Ben and Laura talking behind a closed window blind to stills from the episode, as the series continues to shift away from the initial emphasis on Ben and Laura’s relationship. *The title is a one-liner previously exclaimed by Jane to get out of an awkward situation in episode 3, "Adagio." Baby Amanda is not actually left on a bus.
32	19	"Mommy and Me"	Arlene Sanford	Bruce Ferber	March 13, 1988	40263–034	3.4
Richard becomes the star of the parenting class, much to the annoyance of both Linda and Cindy, the instructor. Guest Stars: Arleen Sorkin (Geneva), Jennifer Salt (Cindy), Rebecca Staples (Pam), Deborah Lacey (Joyce), Galyn Gorg (Gail)
33	20	"Lady on a Grate"	Arlene Sanford	Ben Cardinale & Peter Schneider	March 20, 1988	40263–033	3.8
When Jane discovers Mae sleeping outside her window, she goes out of her way to help the homeless woman. After getting a literal runaround at the Social Security office, Jane chains herself to a desk in an effort to attain benefits for Mae. Guest Stars: Rose Marie (Mae Fuller), Patti Yasutake (Miss Shimokawa), Michael Young (TV Reporter), Andrea Ucci (Announcer); Note: The original broadcast ended with Jodi Thelen (Jane) appearing in a public service announcement endorsing The National Volunteer Clearinghouse for the Homeless.
34	21	"Good Intentions"	Arlene Sanford	Brad Isaacs	May 1, 1988	40263–035	3.3
Laura and Ben decide to marry after a pregnancy scare, but when it turns out to be a false positive, Ben withdraws his proposal. Guest Stars: Arleen Sorkin (Geneva), Sam Hazan (Orderly); Note: This is the only episode of the series in which Rueben has a line of dialogue. The voice actor was uncredited.
35	22	"No Reservations"	Arlene Sanford	Unknown	July 10, 1988	40263–020	3.3
Richard and Linda are put through the wringer as they try to secure a spot for Amanda in an exclusive private school. Guest Stars: Jerry Houser (John), Robert Costanzo (Marty), Harriet Hall (Susan)

=== Season 3 (1988–1989) ===
No. overall	No. in season	Title	Directed by	Written by	Original release date	Prod. code	Rating/share (households)
36	1	"Partners"	Arlene Sanford	Ruth Bennett	October 30, 1988	40263–036	N/A
Ben and Laura return from their two-year European honeymoon to discover that the catering company imploded under Jane's leadership. Meanwhile, Linda is unceremoniously fired from her job, so Richard suggests that she and Laura should revive the business together. Guest stars: Arleen Sorkin (Geneva), Larry Poindexter (Cooper Hayden), Lois De Banzie (Evelyn Johnson), Jack Dodson (Walter Johnson)
37	2	"Deja Two"	Arlene Sanford	Charlene Seeger	November 6, 1988	40263–037	N/A
After a college buddy brings up Ben and Linda's past relationship, Richard again becomes crazed with jealousy and Laura eventually follows suit. Guest Star: Arleen Sorkin (Geneva), Julius Carry (Luke)
38	3	"It's My Party"	Arlene Sanford	Bruce Ferber	November 13, 1988	40263–038	N/A
Amanda tells her parents that she doesn't want a birthday party or gifts, but Linda completely ignores this request. Also, Ben struggles to make a magic trick work. Guest Stars: Arleen Sorkin (Geneva), Jay Johnson (Oscar/Vic), Forry Smith (Kenny), Erin Wilkinson (Stacy)
39	4	"For Richard, For Poorer"	Michael Zinberg	Russell Marcus	November 20, 1988	40263–039	N/A
After an embarrassing shopping experience, Linda and Richard learn that their lavish spending has driven them into bankruptcy, which forces them to sell their possessions and ignites a tiff with Ben and Laura. Ultimately, they have a reversal of fortune when it's brought to their attention that Linda owns a piece of valuable real estate. Guest Stars: Arleen Sorkin (Geneva), Leslie Bevis (Betty), David Wohl (Warren Rigsby)
40	5	"Oh, Boy!"	Michael Zinberg	Charlene Seeger & Russell Marcus	November 27, 1988	40263–040	N/A
Linda attempts to suck up to some rich clients and inadvertently becomes the object of their awkward teenage son's affection. Meanwhile, Ben and Richard play with a model train set. Guest Stars: Arleen Sorkin (Geneva), Jonathan Ward (Teddy Paxton), Kelly Ames (Alexia Paxton), Macon McCalman (Mr. Paxton), Jennifer Bassey (Mrs. Paxton)
41	6	"One Man Out"	Stephen Zuckerman	Bruce Ferber	December 11, 1988	40263–041	6.6
Although he's a horrible player, no one has the heart to drop Richard from the baseball team. Meanwhile, Linda is uncomfortable singing to Amanda, so she hires a professional songstress. Guest Stars: Arleen Sorkin (Geneva), Julius Carry (Luke), David Paymer (Andy), Beverly Sanders (Mrs. McGee)
42	7	"His Mother, Myself"	Iris Dugow	Russell Marcus & Charlene Seeger	December 18, 1988	40263–042	4.2
Jane has a whirlwind romance with Peter, a man she met on a video dating service. After they impulsively become engaged, Laura and Linda discover Jane bears an uncanny resemblance to Peter's domineering mother. Guest Stars: Arleen Sorkin (Geneva), Todd Waring (Peter Sommerfield)
43	8	"Brother From Another Zip Code"	Iris Dugow	Unknown	January 15, 1989	40263–043	4.4
Richard joins the Big Brothers organization to mentor a troubled teen. Guest Stars: Arleen Sorkin (Geneva), Julius Carry (Luke), Lamont Bentley (Snake)
44	9	"Sister of the Year"	Lee Shallat	Susan Seeger	January 29, 1989	40263–044	4.8
Linda's handicapped sister rolls into town to accept a prestigious award, inciting jealousy in Linda and awkwardness in Laura. Guest Stars: Arleen Sorkin (Geneva), Christopher Anne Templeton (Diana Hartley), Ralph Manza (Emcee's Father), Kari Geller (Young Diana Hartley), Maia Brewton (Young Linda Hartley), Henry Holden (Emcee); Note: Alison LaPlaca and Jodi Thelen hosted Fox programming on the night that this episode premiered.
45	10	"The New and Improved Linda"	Iris Dugow	Russell Marcus	February 5, 1989	40263–045	4.3
The girls visit a psychic who warns Linda that a terrible fate will befall her if she doesn't become a nicer person. Guest Stars: Arleen Sorkin (Geneva), Laraine Newman (Madame Marissa/Judge), Armin Shimerman (Dr. Jordan/Jury Foreman)
46	11	"Too Many Cooks"	Arlene Sanford	Charlene Seeger	February 12, 1989	40263–046	5.5
Laura convinces a producer to let her host a cooking segment on a Los Angeles morning show, but she freezes up when the camera goes on. Guest Stars: Joel Brooks (Robert), Joshua Cadman (Steve Maloney), Claudia Lonow (Carol)
47	12	"Read Between the Lines"	Arlene Sanford	Ruth Bennett	February 19, 1989	40263–047	4.8
Steve's life is in shambles, and Linda realizes his problems all stem from illiteracy. Meanwhile, Ben and Laura fight about his love of Late Night with David Letterman. Note: Chris Lemmon (Richard) does not appear in this episode. Guest Stars: Arleen Sorkin (Geneva), Joshua Cadman (Steve Maloney), Ellen Gerstein (Instructor)
48	13	"Don't Quit Your Day Job"	Dwayne Hickman	Alicia Marie Schudt	February 26, 1989	40263–048	4.5
Linda accepts a vice president job at a movie studio, unaware that she's being used as the token female executive. Ben and Laura later discover this and attempt to intervene, not knowing that Linda's already hard at work plotting her revenge. Guest Stars: Terry Kiser (Dennis Bannon), Steven Culp (Martin), Ralph Bruneau (Skip), Doug Dale (Mark McSwain)
49	14	"True Stories"	Lee Shallat-Chemel	Bruce Ferber	March 12, 1989	40263–049	4.6
When he begins writing a nonfiction newspaper column, Ben haplessly alienates everyone in his life. Guest Stars: Joshua Cadman (Steve Maloney), Tom McCleister (Maury Wickes), Ken Foree (Bartender)
50	15	"Role Call"	Michael Zinberg	Charlene Seeger	March 26, 1989	40263–050	4.9
Laura becomes so upset obsessing over their visiting baby sister's preference to Jane that she disrupts a stage performance of The Taming of the Shrew. Guest Stars: Mary Tanner (Molly Kelly), Jack Riley (Frederick), Julie Cobb (Annette)
51	16	"Kiss and Break Up"	Lee Shallat	Russell Marcus	April 9, 1989	40263–051	4.0
Linda's sleazy salesman father arrives out of the blue and charms everyone except his daughter. Guest Star: Arleen Sorkin (Geneva), Pat Harrington Jr. (George Hartley); Note: Matthew Laurance does not appear in this episode because he was shooting Eddie and the Cruisers II. They explained Ben's absence by having Laura answer a series of calls that he was making from his new carphone.
52	17	"On the Nose"	Lee Shallat	Vic Rauseo & Linda Morris	April 23, 1989	40263–052	5.1
To control her snoring, Linda schedules surgery to correct her deviated septum, but Richard becomes so strongly opposed to the notion of her reshaping her nose that he files a legal injunction. Guest Stars: Arleen Sorkin (Geneva), Raye Birk (Dr. Dellerton), Gail Edwards (Kate), Edward Edwards (Larry)
53	18	"Richie and the Vamp"	Lee Shallat	Joanne Pagliaro	April 30, 1989	40263–053	4.9
Linda fears that her marriage is in a rut, and she's right. Richard fantasizes about a sexy barfly. Guest Stars: Gina M. Raymond (Fantasy Woman), John DeMita (Physical Therapist), Andrew Magarian (Waiter)
54	19	"The Birth of a Saleswoman"	Dwayne Hickman	Susan Seeger & Ruth Bennett	May 7, 1989	40263–054	4.6
When Linda pops into a real estate office seeking change for the parking meter, she ends up selling her house and landing a new job as a realtor. Note: This establishes the setup for the next season, but since the show had shifted so far away from its original concept, it was retitled Open House. Guest Stars: Philip Charles MacKenzie (Ted Nichols), Danny Gans (Scott Babylon), Ellen DeGeneres (Margo Van Meter), Ray Buktenica (Dave Hayes), Jon Cypher (John Green)

== Reception ==
The show received a largely positive reception. TV Guide compared it to The Mary Tyler Moore Show, noting that it "manages to balance whimsy and reality." Remarking on the Sunday night schedule, which included a movie-of-the-week on two of the three other broadcast networks, The Houston Post said, "If you are tired of movie after movie on the networks, Duet is for you." The South Florida Sentinel hailed it as Fox's "best series to date", and The Journal News remarked that "producers Ruth Bennett and Susan Seeger choreograph this mating dance beautifully."

Despite good reviews, the show remained ratings-challenged. The Fox network was initially regarded as a joke in Hollywood and ratings weren't published until the second season, which found Duet near the bottom of the yearly TV ratings list in 118th place. The third season didn't fare much better, with it ranking in 104th place.
