= Alison La Placa =

American actress (born 1959)

- Born: December 16, 1959 (age 66); Lincolnshire, Illinois, U.S.
- Occupation: Actress
- Years active: 1983–2014
- Spouse: Philip Charles MacKenzie (m. 1992)

Alison La Placa (born December 16, 1959) is an American retired actress best known for playing Linda Phillips on the sitcom Duet and its spin-off Open House, playing Catherine Merrick in 49 episodes of The John Larroquette Show and the recurring role of Joanna, Rachel Green's boss who dated Chandler Bing on the sitcom Friends. Her last credit was in 2014.

== Biography ==
=== Early life and career ===
Alison LaPlaca was born to an Italian Catholic family in Lincolnshire, Illinois, a suburb of Chicago, in 1959. She is the youngest of three children. She graduated from Stevenson High School in 1978.

Alison LaPlaca attended Illinois Wesleyan University in Bloomington, Illinois, where she studied drama/theatre. During the summers, she starred in a circus show, Circus Fantastic, at Marriott's Great America. She graduated in 1982 with her BFA.

Shortly after moving to Hollywood, La Placa landed the role of Elyse in the sitcom version of Barry Levinson's dramedy film Diner (1982). That pilot did not get picked up, and soon thereafter La Placa got a role in the made-for-TV film Listen to Your Heart (1983).

=== Later career ===
The following year, La Placa earned a regular spot on the short-lived sitcom Suzanne Pleshette Is Maggie Briggs (1984). She had a small role in the movie Fletch (1985), and subsequently played the starring role of Linda Phillips on the sitcoms Duet (from 1987 to 1989) and Open House (from 1989 to 1990). La Placa played opposite Kirstie Alley in the comedy movie Madhouse (1990), with co-star John Larroquette.

La Placa has guest-starred on series including Family Ties, Cheers, ER and Desperate Housewives. She was a regular on Stat (1991), The Jackie Thomas Show (1992), Tom (1994), and the NBC sitcom The John Larroquette Show (from 1994 to 1996).LaPlaca also guest-starred on the sitcom Friends, where she portrays Joanna, Rachel Green’s boss. This role has become one of her more recognizable television appearances among younger audiences.

La Placa guest-starred on animated series such as Batman: The Animated Series and Johnny Bravo. She played the character Andrea in the television series Boston Legal in two episodes in season 4 ("Glow in the Dark" and "Rescue Me"). She appeared in Malcolm in the Middle as Barbara in the episode "Convention" and in a recurring role in 'Til Death as Beth, Joy's co-worker. She guest-starred in the CBS sitcom Mom.

=== Personal life ===
LaPlaca has been married to television actor/director Philip Charles MacKenzie (her co-star on Open House) since 1992.

== Filmography ==
=== Film ===
| Year | Title | Role | Notes |
|---|---|---|---|
| 1984 | Voyage of the Rock Aliens | Diane | Credited as Alison Laplaca |
| 1985 | Fletch | Pan Am Clerk | |
| 1990 | Madhouse | Claudia | |

=== Television ===
| Year | Title | Role | Notes |
|---|---|---|---|
| 1983 | Listen to Your Heart | Lynn | Television film |
| 1984 | Diner | Elyse | Television short |
| 1984 | Maggie Briggs | Melanie Bitterman | Episode: "A New Leaf" |
| 1984 | Family Ties | Barbara | Episode: "Fabric Smarts" |
| 1985 | Cheers | Paula Nelson | Episode: "Behind Every Great Man" |
| 1985 | Brothers | Annie Todson | Episode: "The Shoop Shoop Shop" |
| 1985 | Murder: By Reason of Insanity | Janet Landry | Television film (credited as Alison LaPlaca) |
| 1986 | Remington Steele | Joan Kendall | Episode: "Steele in the Running" |
| 1986 | Second Serve | Nightclub Singer | Television film |
| 1987 | Our House | Ann Tollfeson | Episode: "The Best Intentions" |
| 1987 | Fame | Ms. Audrey Fleming | Episode: "The Crimson Blade" |
| 1987 | The $25,000 Pyramid | Herself | Aired November 23, 1987 to November 27, 1987 |
| 1987-1989 | Duet | Linda Phillips | Main role |
| 1989-1990 | Open House | Linda Phillips | Main role |
| 1991 | Stat | Dr. Elizabeth Newberry | Main role |
| 1991 | In The Nick of Time | Susan Rosewell | Television film |
| 1992-1993 | The Jackie Thomas Show | Laura Miller | Main role |
| 1994 | Batman: The Animated Series | Baby-Doll / Mary Louise Dahl | Voice, episode: "Baby-Doll" (credited as Alison LaPlaca) |
| 1994 | Tom | Dorothy Graham | Main role |
| 1994-1996 | The John Larroquette Show | Catherine Merrick | Recurring role; 49 episodes |
| 1997 | Duckman | Marion | Voice, episode: "With Friends Like These" |
| 1997 | Temporarily Yours | Lily Greer | Episode: "By Design" |
| 1997 | Johnny Bravo | Lois/Brunette | Voice, episode: "Going Batty/Berry the Butler/Red Faced in the White House" (credited as Alison LaPlaca) |
| 1997 | Friends | Joanna | 3 episodes (credited as Alison LaPlaca) |
| 1998 | 7th Heaven | Carolyn Fulton | Episode: "...And a Nice Chianti" |
| 1999 | Hercules | Additional voices | Episode: "Hercules and the Odyssey Experience" |
| 2000 | Malcolm in the Middle | Barbara | Episode: "Convention" (credited as Alison LaPlaca) |
| 2001 | Nathan's Choice | Pilot | Television short |
| 2002 | ER | Female Lawyer | Episode: "Lockdown" |
| 2006 | Desperate Housewives | Rita Patterson | Episode: "The Miracle Song" (credited as Alison LaPlaca) |
| 2007 | The O.C. | Dr. James | Episode: "The Groundhog Day" (credited as Alison LaPlaca) |
| 2007 | Grey's Anatomy | Mrs. Nolston | 2 episodes (credited as Alison LaPlaca) |
| 2008 | Boston Legal | Andrea Michele | 2 episodes (credited as Alison LaPlaca) |
| 2008-2010 | 'Til Death | Beth | 3 episodes (credited as Alison LaPlaca) |
| 2009 | Lie to Me | Diane Ktretschmer | Episode: "Do No Harm" (credited as Alison LaPlaca) |
| 2009 | Without a Trace | Mary Whitman | Episode: "Voir Dire" (credited as Alison LaPlaca) |
| 2010 | 15 Minutes | Goldie | Television short |
| 2011 | Man Up! | Caroll | Episode: "Acceptance" |
| 2012 | Up All Night | Gail Reinhold | Episode: "Preschool Auction" (credited as Alison LaPlaca) |
| 2014 | Mom | Louanne | Episode: "Forged Resumes and the Recommended Dosage" (credited as Alison LaPlaca) |
