= Ubu Productions =

Independent production company founded in 1982 by Gary David Goldberg

- Type: Independent
- Industry: Production
- Founded: 1982; 44 years ago United States
- Founder: Gary David Goldberg
- Defunct: 2005; 21 years ago
- Headquarters: United States

Ubu Productions, Inc. was an American independent production company founded in 1982 by television producer Gary David Goldberg. Ubu's notable productions include Family Ties (1982–1989), Brooklyn Bridge (1991–1993), and Spin City (1996–2002).

Ubu co-produced many of its shows with Paramount Television and in later years, DreamWorks Television.

Ubu's mascot is Goldberg's dog Ubu Roi (named for the French play), a black Labrador Retriever that he had in college and subsequently traveled the world with. The closing tag for Ubu Productions is a photograph of Ubu Roi with a frisbee in his mouth, taken in the Tuileries Garden close to the Louvre Museum in Paris. Along with the picture is Goldberg himself saying "Sit, Ubu, sit! Good dog!", followed by a bark created by the sound engineer working on the closing tag.

== Filmography ==
=== Film ===
Title	Release date	Director	Producer	Writer	Co-production	Distributor	Budget	Box office	Note(s)
Dad	October 27, 1989	Gary David Goldberg	Gary David Goldberg; Joseph Stern	Gary David Goldberg	Amblin Entertainment	Universal Pictures	$19 million	$27 million	
Bye Bye Love	March 17, 1995	Sam Weisman	Gary David Goldberg; Brad Hall; Sam Weisman	Gary David Goldberg; Brad Hall		20th Century Fox		$12 million	
Must Love Dogs	July 29, 2005	Gary David Goldberg	Gary David Goldberg; Suzanne Todd; Jennifer Todd	Gary David Goldberg	Team Todd	Warner Bros. Pictures	$30 million	$58 million	

=== Television ===
Title	Creator(s)	First air date	Last air date	Co-production	Network	Note(s)
Making the Grade	Gary David Goldberg	April 5, 1982	May 10, 1982	Paramount Television	CBS	
Family Ties	Gary David Goldberg	September 22, 1982	May 14, 1989	Paramount Television	NBC	
Sara	Gary David Goldberg; Ruth Bennett	January 8, 1985	May 8, 1985	NBC Productions	NBC	
The Bronx Zoo	Gary David Goldberg (developed by Patricia Jones; Donald Reiker)	March 19, 1987	June 29, 1988	Paramount Television	NBC	
Duet	Ruth Bennett; Susan Seeger	April 19, 1987	May 7, 1989	Paramount Television	Fox	
Day by Day	Andy Borowitz; Gary David Goldberg	February 29, 1988	June 25, 1989	Paramount Television	NBC	
Open House	Ruth Bennett; Susan Seeger	August 27, 1989	July 21, 1990	Paramount Television	Fox	
His & Hers	Patricia Jones; Donald Reiker	March 5, 1990	August 22, 1990	Paramount Television	CBS	
American Dreamer	Susan Seeger	September 20, 1990	June 22, 1991	Paramount Television	NBC	
Brooklyn Bridge	Gary David Goldberg	September 20, 1991	August 6, 1993	Paramount Television	CBS	
Champs	Gary David Goldberg	January 9, 1996	August 7, 1996	DreamWorks Television	ABC	
Spin City	Gary David Goldberg; Bill Lawrence	September 17, 1996	April 30, 2002	Lottery Hill Entertainment; DreamWorks Television	ABC	
Battery Park	Gary David Goldberg; Chris Henchy	March 23, 2000	April 13, 2000	DreamWorks Television	NBC	
