= Linda Carlson =

American actress (1945–2021)

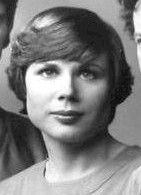
- Carlson in Westside Medical (1977)
- Born: May 12, 1945; Knoxville, Tennessee, U.S.
- Died: October 26, 2021 (aged 76); Gaylordsville, Connecticut, U.S.
- Education: University of Iowa (BA); New York University (MFA)
- Occupation: Actress
- Years active: 1977–2009
- Spouse(s): Philip Charles MacKenzie (m. 19??, div. 19??); Jim Hart (m. ??)

Linda Carlson (May 12, 1945 – October 26, 2021) was an American actress.

== Early life ==
Carlson was born in Knoxville, Tennessee, on May 12, 1945, and raised in Minnesota; she was of Swedish descent. She attended the University of Iowa, where she received a bachelor's degree in speech and dramatic arts. She went on to teach for several months at a high school in Flint, Michigan, before moving to New York City, where she attended the NYU School of the Arts and received a master's degree. She later taught acting at NYU.

== Stage ==
Carlson broke into professional theater with the Negro Ensemble Company in New York, then spent a season at the Repertory Theatre in Milwaukee, Wisconsin. She went on to appear at the Guthrie Theater in Minneapolis, Minnesota, at Canada's Manitoba Theatre Center in Winnipeg, and at the McCarter Theatre in Princeton, New Jersey, as well as with the Indiana Repertory Theatre in Indianapolis, Indiana. Off-Broadway productions in which she appeared include The Harangues (1969), The Death of Lord Chatterly (1973), Miss Julie (1973), Demons: A Possession (1974), Winner Take All (1975) and Light Up the Sky (1990). On Broadway, she portrayed Crete in Full Circle (1973) and was an understudy in A Memory of Two Mondays / 27 Wagons Full of Cotton (1976), and They Knew What They Wanted (1976).

== Television ==
Carlson starred on Westside Medical, portrayed Katie McKenna on Kaz and appeared on Murder One.

Carlson played the part of Ellen Sherback in the Kojak episode "Cry for the Kids" in 1977.

In the episode "Hotel Oceanview" of the series WKRP in Cincinnati, which premiered on November 28, 1980, Carlson played a woman attracted to station salesman Herb Tarlek (Frank Bonner). He is deeply shaken when she tells him that they were on the football team together in high school, she having since undergone a sex change.

On the series Newhart, Carlson had a recurring role as Bev Dutton, the manager of the small Vermont television station where Bob Newhart hosted a Sunday afternoon interview program.

Carlson appeared in the episode "Comings and Goings" of the 1995 situation comedy Double Rush.

== Personal life ==
She was married to actor-director Philip Charles MacKenzie, whom she met at NYU. They eventually divorced. She went on to marry Jim Hart, a former Marine Corps tank officer turned IT specialist.

Carlson died from amyotrophic lateral sclerosis in Gaylordsville, Connecticut, on October 26, 2021, at the age of 76.

== Partial filmography ==
- Honey, I Blew Up the Kid (1992) ... Nosy neighbor
- The Pickle (1993) ... Bernadette
- The Beverly Hillbillies (1993) ... Aunt Pearl
- Murder One (1995–1997) ... Judge Beth Bornstein
- Roadside Assistance (2001) ... Queen of Hearts
