= Making the Grade (TV series) =

- Genre: Sitcom
- Created by: Gary David Goldberg
- Starring: James Naughton; Graham Jarvis; Alley Mills; Steven Peterman; Zane Lasky; George Wendt; Philip Charles MacKenzie
- Composer: Tom Scott
- Country of origin: United States
- Original language: English
- No. of seasons: 1
- No. of episodes: 6

Production
- Executive producer: Gary David Goldberg
- Running time: 30 minutes
- Production companies: Ubu Productions; Paramount Television

Original release
- Network: CBS
- Release: April 5 – May 10, 1982

Making the Grade is an American sitcom which aired on CBS from April 5 until May 10, 1982. It starred James Naughton, Graham Jarvis, Alley Mills, Steven Peterman, and boasted the first TV series roles for Philip Charles MacKenzie and George Wendt. It was set at Franklin High School in St. Louis, and aired as a part of CBS' Monday night comedy lineup. The theme song was a modified version of Tom Scott's "Heading Home", which appeared on his Street Beat album three years earlier.

The quick cancellation of Making the Grade allowed series co-star George Wendt the opportunity to star in the series Cheers, which began airing just four months after the final episode of Making the Grade was broadcast. As well, series creator Gary David Goldberg's next series was the substantial hit Family Ties; also produced by Paramount Television and aired on NBC like Cheers, it too began airing four months after the cancellation of Making the Grade.

== Cast ==
- James Naughton as Harry Barnes (Dean of Boys)
- Graham Jarvis as Assistant Principal Jack Felspar
- Alley Mills as Sara Conover (drama teacher)
- Steven Peterman as Jeff Keitan
- Zane Lasky as Anton Zemeckis
- George Wendt as Gus Bertoia (physical education teacher)
- Philip Charles MacKenzie as David Wasserman
- Veronica Redd as Janice Reeves

== U.S. television ratings ==
Season	Episodes	Start date	End date	Nielsen rank	Nielsen rating
1981–82	6	April 5, 1982	May 10, 1982	38	N/A

== Episodes ==
No.	Title	Directed by	Written by	Original release date
1	"Pilot"	Mel Damski	Gary David Goldberg	April 5, 1982
2	"Marriage, Dave Style"	Jeff Melman	Lloyd Garver	April 12, 1982
3	"Teach Me Tonight"	Gary David Goldberg	Michael J. Weithorn	April 19, 1982
4	"Shepherd's Pie Syndrome"	Mark Tinker	Richard Orloff	April 26, 1982
5	"Guess Who's Coming to Class"	Mel Damski	Merrill Markoe	May 3, 1982
6	"Enter Miss Right"	Mel Damski	Steve Kline	May 10, 1982
