= Listen to Your Heart (1983 film) =

- Directed by: Don Taylor
- Starring: George Barrow; George Coe; Ernest Harada; Kate Jackson; Alison La Placa; Tim Matheson; Will Nye; Tony Plana; Cassie Yates; John J. York
- Music by: James Di Pasquale
- Country of origin: United States
- Original language: English

Production
- Producers: William F Phillips; Don Taylor
- Cinematography: Jack L. Richards
- Editor: Tom Stevens
- Running time: 100 minutes
- Production companies: CBS Entertainment Production; CBS

Original release
- Network: CBS
- Release: January 4, 1983

Listen to Your Heart is a 1983 American romantic comedy television film starring George Barrow and George Coe. The film is produced by director Don Taylor and William F. Phillips. The film was edited by Tom Stevens. The music is composed by James Di Pasquale.

In it, a book editor (Tim Matheson) falls in love with a co-worker (Kate Jackson) and has complications balancing his career with his newfound love.

== Plot ==
The movie begins in a singles bar. Frannie (Kate Jackson) has just ended a six-year relationship with her boss. She is brought to the singles bar club, wanting to try casual affairs, by her close friend Stacey (Cassie Yates). Meanwhile, Josh (Tim Matheson) is dragged there by his friend Marvin (Will Nye), who wants to have a few flings before marriage. The two women send a waitress over to them who then responds "The two, right over there, want that you should join them."

Then Frannie and Josh go to his place, but no affection happens. Frannie wakes up the next day in her apartment, dead drunk. Unfortunately, she has to move to Stacey's apartment. As the two develop a relationship, it is found that Frannie is a co-worker with Josh. The movie deals with them working in the same office and maintaining a relationship.

== Cast ==
- George Barrow as Bit
- George Coe as John
- Ernest Harada as
- Kate Jackson as Frannie Green
- Alison La Placa as Lynn
- Tim Matheson as Josh Stern
- Will Nye as Marvin
- Cassie Yates as Stacey
- John J. York as Steve
