= Carol Rosin =

American author, speaker, and futurist

Carol S. Rosin
- Born: March 29, 1944 (age 82); Wilmington, Delaware, U.S.
- Occupations: Space and missile defense consultant, military strategist, and author
- Spouse: Jon Cypher (m. 1986; died 2026)

Carol S. Rosin is an American speaker, author, educator, futurist, and military strategist. She is the founder of the Institute for Security and Cooperation in Outer Space. She was also the first female executive of an aerospace company, working as a corporate manager of Fairchild Industries. She is executive director of the Peace and Emergency Action Coalition for Earth, P.E.A.C.E. Inc., and the I.D.E.A Foundation, as well as a world peace ambassador for the International Association of Educators for World Peace.

== Biography ==
Born in Wilmington, Delaware, she received her Bachelor's of Science degree from the University of Delaware and an honorary doctorate from Archbishop Solomon Gbadebo of the Orthodox College in Nigeria. She was the first woman to work as an Aerospace executive at Fairchild Industries and is involved in the movement to stop anti-satellite weapons and the Strategic Defense Initiative.

During her time at Fairchild, Rosin served as the spokesperson for Wernher von Braun, with whom she created the film and educational program "It's Your Turn" to expand the diversity of people working in science fields. The program won many awards, including the Aviation Writers Award and the Science Teachers Gold Medal.

Rosin helped create medical and educational training programs with ATS-6 satellites in the United States, including the first two-way audio and visual national and international satellite educational programs in over 20 countries.

== Published works and media ==
- Start of the Sirius Disclosure Project in 2001 at the National press Club, as witness.
- Movies That Shook the World (documentary), herself, 2005
- UFO: The Greatest Story Ever Denied II - Moon Rising (video documentary), herself, 2009
- Sirius (documentary), herself, 2013
- For the Children (Book, I.D.E.A Foundation for the Benefit of Humanity), co-author, 2014 ISBN 9781530161393
- The Carol Rosin Show (American Freedom Radio), host, 2016-
- Unacknowledged (documentary), herself, 2017
- 20th Anniversary of the Disclosure Project as herself, 2021
- The Cosmic Hoax: An Exposé (documentary) as herself, 2021
