= Danny Gans =

American singer (1956–2009)

- Born: October 25, 1956; Los Angeles, California, U.S.
- Died: May 1, 2009 (aged 52); Henderson, Nevada, U.S.

Comedy career
- Years active: 1984–2009
- Medium: Stand-up comedy, theater
- Genre: Impressions
- Website: www.dannygans.com

Danny Davies Gans (October 25, 1956 – May 1, 2009) was an American singer, comedian and vocal impressionist.

== Career ==
Gans was a performer on the Las Vegas Strip and the surrounding area, where he was billed as "The Man of Many Voices." He had been named Las Vegas Entertainer of the Year and his production had been awarded Show of the Year for 10 straight years from 1998 to 2008.

Prior to entering show business, Gans was a professional baseball player. He was drafted by the Chicago White Sox after being named an All-America at California Polytechnic State University in San Luis Obispo where he was a Physical Education major. It was at Cal Poly that he met his wife, Julie.

Later, he held a small role as a third baseman in the romantic comedy Bull Durham (1988). After an injury ended his sporting career—a player's spikes tore his Achilles tendon while he was fielding a ground ball—Gans turned to the entertainment industry. Gans began his career on the road, performing mostly at private corporate functions. In 1992, he played Dean Martin in the CBS miniseries Sinatra. In 1995, he moved to Broadway to perform a one-man show but later decided to move to Las Vegas to reduce time away from his family, who lived in Los Angeles.

Gans started his Las Vegas stay at the Stratosphere Hotel in 1996. His show there was successful and he moved over to the Rio in 1998. In 2000, Gans' show moved again, this time to The Mirage where the Danny Gans Theatre was built for him. In February 2009, Gans changed venues again and performed at Encore Las Vegas, the sister property to Wynn Las Vegas. The marquee on Las Vegas Strip bearing his image at one time held the record as the largest freestanding marquee in the world.

His first record album, produced by Michael Omartian, was cross-marketed in both the pop and Christian music genres and, although Gans never charted, it sold in both mainstream and Christian music outlets.

At the time of his death, he was grossing $18 million a year.

He was also known for his vintage car collection.

== Death ==
Gans died on May 1, 2009, at his home in Henderson, Nevada, shortly after his wife called paramedics saying he was having difficulty breathing. The cause of death was a drug toxicity caused by the combination of hydromorphone (an opiate, commonly marketed under the name Dilaudid) and a pre-existing heart condition. It was determined that his death was caused by an adverse drug reaction, and was not drug abuse-related.

Gans had three children, Amy, Andrew and Emily. He is interred at Forest Lawn Memorial Park in Glendale, California.

== Film and television ==
Gans had been noted many times for his role in Bull Durham, although his role in the movie was ultimately downsized. He used this role as an addition to his resume, even going on Roy Firestone's show and promoting the role while holding a picture of himself from the movie to prove that he was, in fact, in it.

Gans played Roger in the television series Silk Stalkings for 12 episodes (1991–92), played Scott Babylon in the sitcom Duet (1987–89), and reprised his role in the spin-off Open House (1989–90). In the Roseanne episode "Vegas, Vegas" (1991), he played a Wayne Newton impersonator.

He had an uncredited cameo as himself in the sci-fi adventure movie Race to Witch Mountain (2009). Gans was mentioned several times, but did not appear, in an episode of the sitcom Gary Unmarried (which aired shortly after his death, on May 6, 2009). When aired, the episode was accompanied by an "In Memory Of" end-credit dedicated to Gans.

In the 2025 film Voices: the Danny Gans Story, his son Andrew tells the story of his father through interviews and performances.
