= Tom (American TV series) =

American sitcom

- Genre: Sitcom
- Created by: Tom Arnold; Roseanne Arnold; Steve Pepoon
- Starring: Tom Arnold; Alison La Placa; Jason Marsden; Josh Stoppelwerth; Tiffany Lubran; Kathryn Lubran; Andrew Lawrence; Danton Stone; Colleen Camp
- Country of origin: United States
- Original language: English
- No. of seasons: 1
- No. of episodes: 11 (1 unaired)

Production
- Camera setup: Multi-camera
- Running time: 30 minutes
- Production companies: Wapello County Productions; Warner Bros. Television

Original release
- Network: CBS
- Release: March 2 – June 13, 1994

Tom is an American sitcom television series that premiered on CBS during the mid-season from March 2 to June 13, 1994. It was canceled after one season due to poor ratings.

== Cast ==
- Tom Arnold as Tom Graham
- Alison La Placa as Dorothy Graham, Tom's wife
- Jason Marsden as Mike Graham, Tom & Dorothy's son
- Josh Stoppelwerth as Trevor Graham, Tom & Dorothy's son
- Tiffany Lubran as Emily Graham, Tom & Dorothy's daughter and Charlotte's identical twin sister
- Kathryn Lubran as Charlotte Graham, Tom & Dorothy's daughter and Emily's identical twin sister
- Andrew Lawrence as Donnie Graham, Tom & Dorothy's son
- Danton Stone as Rodney
- Colleen Camp as Kara

== Episodes ==
No.	Title	Directed by	Written by	Original release date	Viewers (millions)
1	"Pilot"	Will Mackenzie	Tom Arnold, Roseanne Arnold, Steve Pepoon	March 2, 1994	15.9
2	"The Bad Seed"	Will Mackenzie	Sid Youngers	March 9, 1994	11.6
3	"Car Fair"	Will Mackenzie	Nelson Costello	March 16, 1994	9.6
4	"The Acorn Fell Far, Far from the Tree"	Will Mackenzie	Lawrence Broch	March 23, 1994	11.3
5	"Slow Runnings"	Robert Berlinger	William Lucas Walker	March 30, 1994	10.8
6	"Daddyshack"	Robert Berlinger	Art Everett	April 6, 1994	11.2
7	"Tom's Thumb"	Robert Berlinger	David Silverman and Steve Sustarsic	April 13, 1994	8.5
8	"Mike's Excellent Adventure"	Philip Charles MacKenzie	Mark Drop	April 20, 1994	8.2
9	"He's Heavy, He's My Brother"	Philip Charles MacKenzie	Sid Youngers	April 27, 1994	8.7
10	"Dump Dog Day Afternoon"	Philip Charles MacKenzie	Eleah Horwitz	June 6, 1994	11.3
11	"Reunion"	Philip Charles MacKenzie	Nelson Costello and Amy Morland	June 13, 1994	10.5
12	"Invasion of the Mole People"	Philip Charles MacKenzie	Mindy Schneider	Unaired	N/A
