= The Jackie Thomas Show =

- From left to right, Dennis Boutsikaris, Tom Arnold and Alison LaPlaca
- Created by: Tom Arnold; Roseanne Arnold; Brad Isaacs
- Written by: Tom Arnold; Roseanne Arnold; Lawrence Broch; David Fury; Elin Hampton; Brad Isaacs; Joel Madison; Sid Youngers; William Lucas Walker
- Directed by: Michael Lessac; Peter Segal
- Starring: Tom Arnold; Dennis Boutsikaris; Alison La Placa; Breckin Meyer; Michael Boatman; Paul Feig; Maryedith Burrell; Martin Mull
- Country of origin: United States
- Original language: English
- No. of seasons: 1
- No. of episodes: 18

Production
- Executive producers: Tom Arnold; Roseanne Arnold
- Running time: 30 minutes
- Production companies: Wapello County Productions; Lorimar Television

Original release
- Network: ABC
- Release: December 1, 1992 – April 30, 1993

The Jackie Thomas Show is an American sitcom that aired on the ABC network from December 1992 to March 1993. The series received widespread attention due to its creators Roseanne Arnold, then starring in the fifth season of her comedy Roseanne, and her then-husband and Roseanne co-producer Tom Arnold. The Jackie Thomas Show starred Tom Arnold as a misanthropic sitcom actor.

== Premise ==
As Jackie Thomas, Arnold played a former nightclub comic and slaughterhouse worker now starring in his own sitcom (a show-within-a-show), also called "The Jackie Thomas Show." As described in one review, Arnold's character was "an obnoxious, loud-mouthed tyrant who fires writers, producers, actors, even the show's caterers, on the slightest whim." In the premiere episode (written by the Arnolds with Brad Isaacs), Jackie demanded that the child actor portraying his sitcom son be killed off, due to Jackie's jealousy over the amount of fan mail received by the boy.

"He's unbelievable," Tom Arnold said of the Jackie Thomas character. "It's a guy you love to hate. He has his own reality and it's different from the people around him. And you go, 'Gosh, the guy is such a jerk.' But you have compassion for him, especially as the show goes on, because you learn where he came from, what's really going on with him." The character was named in tribute to Arnold's two favorite comedians, Jackie Gleason and Danny Thomas.

From the beginning, The Jackie Thomas Show was intended to be an ensemble production, as Arnold "didn't feel [he] was ready" to support a show on his own. The cast included recurring Roseanne guest star Martin Mull as a network executive, Dennis Boutsikaris, Michael Boatman, Paul Feig and Maryedith Burrell as writers and Alison La Placa as an office assistant.

The show was designed partly as an homage to The Dick Van Dyke Show, which centered around a fictional television variety show with a tyrannical star. (A photo of Dick Van Dyke was displayed prominently on a character's desk in the first Jackie Thomas episode.) Roseanne Arnold said that she had always "wanted to do a TV show that talks about television."

== Cast ==
- Tom Arnold as Jackie Thomas
- Dennis Boutsikaris as Jerry Harper
- Alison La Placa as Laura Miller
- Breckin Meyer as Chas Walker
- Michael Boatman as Grant Watson
- Paul Feig as Bobby Wynn
- Maryedith Burrell as Nancy
- Martin Mull as Doug Talbot

=== Comparisons to the Arnolds ===
Critics drew many comparisons between the premise of The Jackie Thomas Show and Roseanne and Tom Arnold's real lives. Like Jackie Thomas, Tom Arnold had worked at a meatpacking plant and as a nightclub comic before realizing fame and fortune in the sitcom world. The Arnolds were also notorious for quarreling with Roseanne's writing staff and firing writers on a whim, much like the fictional Thomas. The couple acknowledged the similarities; Tom Arnold was quoted, "We wanted to take the show-business end of our lives and mix the public perception of us and the reality of us and put them into the show--the images of what people think maybe we did or what they've read that we did."

Roseanne said, "All the work we do is personal. It's based on my kids, my family. You just take it from real life. That's the funniest stuff."

Such comparisons were bolstered by a BBC documentary, Feeding the Monster, which depicted the backstage activity behind the writing, rehearsal and filming of the season four Roseanne episode "Santa Claus." Although the documentary didn't mention The Jackie Thomas Show, the Los Angeles Times' Jeff Kaye said that "the documentary unveils a real-life, parallel universe to the new series." Kaye wrote that "the show's writers live in constant terror, their exhausting work-weeks punctuated by Pepto-Bismol swigging and all-night writing sessions. They are emotionally battered and their life expectancy on the show is short." The segment aired in Britain but was omitted from the documentary's American broadcast on the Showtime cable channel, due to Roseanne Arnold's relationship with Showtime's rival HBO.

== Episodes ==
No.	Title	Directed by	Written by	Original release date	Viewers (millions)
1	"Pilot"	Andrew D. Weyman	Tom Arnold & Roseanne & Brad Isaacs	December 1, 1992	30.8
2	"Charity, Schmarity"	Michael Lessac	Sid Youngers	December 8, 1992	21.3
3	"Jack & the Bean Stalker"	Michael Lessac	David Fury & Elin Hampton	December 15, 1992	27.7
4	"Ottumwa, 52501"	Michael Lessac	Joel Madison	December 22, 1992	19.3
5	"The Joke"	Michael Lessac	George Beckerman	December 29, 1992	20.2
6	"Jackie and the Model"	Michael Lessac	Lawrence Broch & Brad Isaacs	January 5, 1993	25.6
7	"Stand Up for Bastards"	Michael Lessac	Lawrence Broch	January 12, 1993	25.7
8	"The All-Nighter"	Michael Lessac	Steve Pepoon	January 19, 1993	18.4
9	"Jackie's Family"	Michael Lessac	Art Everett	January 26, 1993	N/A
10	"The Forces of Nature"	Michael Lessac	William Lucas Walker	February 2, 1993	20.0
11	"The Player"	Michael Lessac	Ken LaZebnik	February 9, 1993	19.6
12	"Guys and Balls"	Michael Lessac	David Fury & Elin Hampton	February 16, 1993	18.1
13	"Strike"	Michael Lessac	Joel Madison	February 23, 1993	20.8
14	"Write This Way"	Peter Segal	Bill Bauer & Charles Bliss	March 2, 1993	19.1
15	"Sophie's Choice"	Michael Lessac	Mike Dugan	March 9, 1993	19.0
16	"One Flu Over the Cuckoo's Nest"	Michael Lessac	Sid Younger	March 16, 1993	20.2
17	"Poker, Schmoker"	Michael Lessac	David Silverman & Steve Sustarsic	March 23, 1993	22.9
18	"Aloha, Io-wahu"	Peter Segal	Lawrence Broch & William Lucas Walker	March 30, 1993	18.1

== Reviews ==
Tom Shales of The Washington Post wrote that The Jackie Thomas Show "seems a solid piece of comedy workmanship, yet remains stubbornly and unfunnily off-putting," largely blaming weak characterization; of the Jackie Thomas character, he said, "Thomas is a letdown when we meet him...a character smaller than life."

Similarly, Howard Rosenberg of the Los Angeles Times felt that "the only time that "The Jackie Thomas Show" truly works is when other characters are describing and creating mental images of Jackie's bullying, authoritarian tactics. When Jackie actually shows up in the person of the one-dimensional Arnold, the image disintegrates." Rosenberg called the pilot episode "weak and unsatisfying."

Rick Kogan of the Chicago Tribune reviewed the show more favorably, calling it "as solidly crafted a sitcom as I've seen in some time." He praised the pilot for introducing "an attractively quirky cast" and "a wholly conceived, interesting environment." John Freeman of The San Diego Union-Tribune also approved of Jackie Thomas, writing that it was "nearly as brilliant" as HBO's The Larry Sanders Show, another series about a show-within-a-show.

=== Faxes sent to critics ===
Soon after the show's premiere, Roseanne Arnold received widespread attention when she faxed vitriolic, profanity-laced messages to three television critics who had reviewed Jackie Thomas: Ray Richmond of the Los Angeles Daily News; Matt Roush of USA Today; and Rosenberg of the Los Angeles Times. Roseanne told the media that the messages were sent in "self-defense" and that the critics in question had chosen to make personal attacks on the Arnolds instead of responding to the show itself. She said, "Generally what emerges in these reviews is fear and loathing of women. It's very misogynistic. Something needs to be done. These people are affecting the revenues of the work Tom does and I do." She defended her use of the anti-gay epithet "faggot" in her letter to Roush, saying that her comments were "based on personal things I know about him." In a later interview, Tom Arnold said he supported his wife's efforts and said the epithet was an "anti-[Roush] term."

== Ratings and scheduling ==
The Jackie Thomas Show debuted on Tuesday, December 1, 1992 at 9:30 PM EST, the time slot directly following Roseanne; the Arnolds publicly acknowledged that they had used their clout to have the show scheduled in what was widely considered the best time slot on television (although they denied rumors that Roseanne had threatened to quit her own show, with Roseanne saying "I didn't have to go that far"). To make room, the timeslot's former occupant Coach moved to 9:30 PM on Wednesday, replacing the sitcom Laurie Hill, which was cancelled.

Tom Arnold said in an interview before the show's debut, "There's pressure to be in that time slot we're in. We've got to get some numbers (ratings) and maintain them. I think ABC believes in the show. And I think if it fails, if it's not meant to be, then we move on and I'll do another show for sure because, no matter what, doing the show has been good for me."

The Jackie Thomas Show debuted with the highest ratings of any network series premiere since Twin Peaks in April 1990, holding onto 90% of viewers from Roseanne. Its ratings were slightly better than Coach's season average in the time slot, and reflected the smallest viewer falloff from Roseanne of any show that had ever been in the time period. The two shows were the top-rated programs for the week.

For the Jackie Thomas premiere, the Arnolds and ABC experimented with a new technique called the hot switch, in which there was no commercial break between two adjoining shows. The preceding episode of Roseanne ended with the Conner family watching a TV set playing the fictional "Jackie Thomas Show," and viewers were then transitioned to the real Jackie Thomas Show. ABC commissioned a special minute-by-minute ratings report from ACNielsen to measure viewer dropoff and found that most viewers stayed with Jackie Thomas for the entire pilot episode.

In its second week, The Jackie Thomas Show fell to 18th in the ratings as it followed a Roseanne rerun, which placed 3rd. The following week, a new Roseanne regained the #1 spot and Jackie Thomas rebounded to #4.

"When a show gets that kind of time slot, it can be good news and bad news," ABC president Ted Harbert said at the end of December 1992. "The good news is that you have the best lead-in on television, and the bad news is that the network's expectations are higher because of that. But it has met our expectations so far."

ABC continued to utilize the hot switch for the programming block for the next three weeks before bowing to complaints from local stations and advertisers; once the commercial break between the two programs was implemented, dropoff between the two shows grew significantly.

Roseanne also featured a crossover episode in February 1993, in which the characters took a road trip to California and attended a taping of The Jackie Thomas Show. In the same month, the Roseanne cast competed against the cast of Jackie Thomas in a three-episode series of The New Family Feud, proceeds from which benefited the Arnolds' foundation for abused children.

=== Renewal battle ===
In January 1993, the Arnolds began to publicly discuss a potential renewal from ABC for a second season of The Jackie Thomas Show, despite the network's repeated refusal to make a decision before May. ABC did order four more episodes of Jackie Thomas in early February, a few days after an ABC spokeswoman said the network was "very happy" with the show's ratings, which at that point had averaged a 15.7 (ninth among 121 series) since its December debut. Later that month, Tom Arnold told multiple sources that ABC had told the Arnolds that the series would be renewed; ABC declined to confirm the report.

During an April 13 appearance on The Tonight Show with Jay Leno, Roseanne Arnold told Jay Leno that she was considering taking Roseanne to another network following the 1993-1994 season if ABC did not renew Jackie Thomas. Such a possibility had been previously mentioned—but immediately dismissed—by Tom Arnold on the talk show Charlie Rose in January. The morning after The Tonight Show interview, Roseanne repeated the threat in a phone interview on the KTLA Morning News, saying "We don't want to be in business with people who make bad decisions." Tom Arnold told KTLA that if Jackie Thomas were cancelled, he would star in a new sitcom on CBS, the same network that had wooed David Letterman from NBC a few months earlier.

In the KTLA interview, Roseanne repeated Tom Arnold's claim that ABC had previously told the couple that Jackie Thomas would be renewed. "I feel I deserve to be treated more honestly," she said. "Coming over to my house and promising me that the show is going to be on and then acting like they didn't ever say it...I am hurt, and I have given them a good show and product."

ABC president Robert Iger responded to the Arnolds in an April 21 news conference, where he maintained that the network would make no commitments until May and stated that the power to move Roseanne to another network rested with the show's producers, Marcy Carsey and Tom Werner of Carsey-Werner Productions, and not with the Arnolds. Iger expressed his resentment that the Arnolds had made the issue so public. He also assessed Jackie Thomas as having performed "reasonably well under the circumstances" in terms of ratings. Although it placed 16th among 142 prime-time network shows for the season, The Jackie Thomas Show had lost about a quarter of Roseanne's viewers on average, garnering a 23% audience share compared to the 31% share brought in by Roseanne.

In an interview published in the April 23 issue of The New York Times, Roseanne said that her relationship with ABC was "absolutely over."

=== Cancellation and aftermath ===
On Friday, May 7, Tom Arnold announced that he would wait no longer for a decision from ABC and was quitting The Jackie Thomas Show to develop a new sitcom for CBS. Both networks declined to comment. The following Monday, ABC debuted its fall prime-time schedule and officially canceled Jackie Thomas along with nine other shows. "The cancellation was made solely on the basis of ratings performance in the time period," ABC spokesman Steve Battaglio said. Less than a week later, the Arnolds announced that ABC Entertainment had signed a multi-series deal, including "on the air commitments," with the couple's production company Wapello County Productions.

On May 20, 1993, CBS confirmed that Tom Arnold would be starring in a half-hour sitcom, titled Tom, about a blue-collar worker living in a trailer with his five children. CBS committed to a 12-episode on-air commitment for the new show, which was later scheduled for a March 1994 debut. Tom Arnold convinced his former Jackie Thomas co-star Alison La Placa to leave her commitment to another series in order to play his wife on Tom, replacing another actress who had already begun work. Tom did not garner high ratings and was cancelled in May 1994.

In November 1994, Tom and Roseanne Arnold divorced. Roseanne remained on ABC until the show's finale in 1997.
