= 1991 in American television =

In 1991, television in the United States saw a number of significant events, including the debuts, finales, and cancellations of television shows; the launch, closure, and rebranding of channels; changes and additions to network affiliations by stations; controversies, business transactions, and carriage disputes; and the deaths of individuals who had made notable contributions to the medium.

== Events ==
Date	Event
January 3	The first television sets with built-in closed-caption display are introduced in the United States.
January 14	Wheel of Fortune returns to NBC (but would ultimately be canceled on September 20, after a 16½ year run on daytime network television).
January 16	Network schedules on the Big Three television networks are pre-empted for news coverage of the first day of Operation Desert Storm, which began during their evening news broadcasts. The cancelled programmes were The Wonder Years, Growing Pains, Doogie Howser, M.D., Married People and Equal Justice on ABC, 48 Hours, Jake and the Fatman and WIOU on CBS, and Unsolved Mysteries, Night Court, Seinfeld and Hunter on NBC.
January 19	NBC breaks away from their telecast of the NHL All-Star Game in the third period to televise a briefing from The Pentagon involving the Gulf War. SportsChannel America included the missing coverage in a replay of NBC's telecast (NBC owned 50% of Rainbow Enterprises, the parent of SportsChannel America).
January 25	The character, Steve Urkel (as portrayed by Jaleel White) of the ABC sitcom Family Matters makes a guest appearance on Full House.
January 27	Whitney Houston delivers a rousing rendition of "The Star-Spangled Banner" during the pre-game ceremonies for Super Bowl XXV. During halftime, ABC broadcast a special ABC News report anchored by Peter Jennings on the progress of the Gulf War. ABC eventually aired the halftime show, headlined by New Kids on the Block on tape delay following the game.
February 7	NBC broadcasts an episode of L.A. Law which features the first in a series of "lesbian kiss episodes", in which a lesbian or bisexual character (in this case, C.J. Lamb) kisses a female character identified as heterosexual (here, Abby Perkins).
February 9	Tim Meadows and Adam Sandler join the cast of NBC's Saturday Night Live. (Meadows stays with the show until 2000, while Sandler departs during 1995.)
February 22	Deborah Norville co-anchors NBC's The Today Show for the final time. Going on maternity leave, she is replaced by Katie Couric, who stays a Today anchor into the early 21st century.
March 3	In Los Angeles, California, African-American Rodney King is beaten severely by police officers after leading them on a high-speed chase and allegedly resisting arrest. A video is made by an observer, and portions of the tape are broadcast repeatedly, resulting in massive rioting in the Los Angeles area.
March 16	A. Whitney Brown makes his final appearance on the NBC sketch comedy program Saturday Night Live.
March 21	An episode of NBC's L.A. Law features Diana Muldaur's character Rosalind Shays plummeting to her death through an open elevator shaft.
April 1	The premium movie channel Encore launches in the United States, primarily on TCI cable systems. The channel initially displayed movies from the 1960s, 1970s and 1980s, before eventually phasing in more recent movies by the 2000s (decade). Showtime Networks initiated Flix, a premium channel with a format identical to Encore less than a year-and-a-half later.
April 1	CBS begins broadcasting a late-night crime-investigation program block entitled Crimetime After Primetime.
April 1	HBO and Viacom agree to merge their respective comedy channels, Ha! and The Comedy Channel to create CTV: The Comedy Network, later known as Comedy Central come June 1991.
April 5	Katie Couric is designated as co-host of The Today Show on NBC after substituting as host since February 1991.
April 20	The Museum of Broadcasting, now known as The Paley Center for Media, relocates into its new 17-story building, located a block from its previous location in New York City.
April 20	An episode of NBC's Saturday Night Live guest hosted by actor Steven Seagal immediately becomes infamous due to Seagal being difficult and uncooperative to work with among the cast and crew. Seagal is soon banned from ever appearing on the series again and is branded by SNL creator and producer Lorne Michaels as the "worst host ever".
May 3	The final episode of Dallas is broadcast by CBS; the series is eventually revived in 2012 on TNT.
May 9	After being diagnosed with inoperable pancreatic cancer in April 1991, Michael Landon appears as a guest on NBC's The Tonight Show Starring Johnny Carson. Landon would succumb to the disease seven weeks later at the age of 54.
May 13	Delta Burke makes her final appearance as Suzanne Sugarbaker on the CBS sitcom Designing Women.
May 22	Tulsa's television station KGCT-TV returns to the air as KTFO-TV.
May 23	WFXG in Augusta, Georgia signs-on as a Fox affiliate, taking that affiliation from W67BE (now NBC affiliate WAGT-CD) which becomes an independent station.
May 23	At an NBC network affiliate managers meeting at New York City's Carnegie Hall, Johnny Carson announces that he will be stepping down as host of The Tonight Show within May of the following year.
May 25	The syndicated sitcom Out of This World concludes its fourth and ultimately final season on an unresolved cliffhanger involving Evie's alien father Troy coming to visit Earth and her mother Donna accidentally taking his place on his home planet, Antares Prime.
June 1	After merging with Ha! and The Comedy Channel. CTV: The Comedy Network becomes Comedy Central. This is to avoid confusion with the Canadian broadcast network known as CTV.
June 2–12	NBC broadcasts the NBA Finals for the first time after the event aired on CBS for the previous 17 years. It was Michael Jordan's first NBA Finals appearance, Magic Johnson's last, and the last NBA Finals for the Los Angeles Lakers until 2000. This series would mark the end of the Lakers' Showtime era and the beginning of the Chicago Bulls' dynasty.
June 3	The Australian soap Neighbours makes its American debut, on KCOP-TV in Los Angeles, CA. Two weeks later, WWOR-TV debuts this for its New York, NY market.
June 3	Scripps-Howard Broadcasting finalizes the purchase on Baltimore's NBC affiliate WMAR-TV from Gillett Communications, which was about to be divested into SCI television.
July 9	The Major League Baseball All-Star Game airs on CBS for the second consecutive year. Emanating from Toronto, it is the second time that the All-Star Game is played outside of the United States, the first being the 1982 All-Star Game in Montreal, Quebec. CBS started their broadcast at the top of the hour with the customary pregame coverage. Because American President George H. W. Bush and Canadian Prime Minister Brian Mulroney were throwing out the first ball, there was a slight delay from the 8:30 p.m. EDT start. The game eventually started about 15–20 minutes late.
July 28	NBC airs a pilot for a proposed series starring Adam West and written and produced by Conan O'Brien and Robert Smigel called Lookwell. While the pilot ultimately wouldn't be picked up as a series, it has since become a cult classic.
August 2	Deidre Hall returns to the NBC soap opera Days of Our Lives after a four-year absence in which her character, Marlena Evans, is revealed to be mysteriously alive and kept hidden outside of Salem after being presumed dead in an accident nearly four years prior.
August 11	Nickelodeon introduces its series of Nicktoons, with Doug, Rugrats and The Ren & Stimpy Show the first three to air.
August 11	WGMB-TV in Baton Rouge, Louisiana signs-on the air, giving the Baton Rouge area its first full-time Fox affiliate (NBC affiliate WVLA had previously aired Fox programming on a delayed basis).
August 13	The time slot for Full House was moved from Friday's TGIF lineup on ABC to Tuesday nights (remaining there until its finale in 1995).
September 1	KLSB-TV in Nacogdoches, Texas signs-on as a satellite of the Tyler market's NBC affiliate KETK-TV. KLSB-TV will eventually become the market's CBS affiliate in 2004 when the station is sold to Max Media.
September 6	KLNO (now MyNetworkTV affiliate KBVO) in Llano, Texas is signed-on by NBC affiliate KXAN-TV to improve coverage of that station in parts of the Texas Hill Country.
September 8	Minnie Pearl makes her final appearance on the program Hee Haw.
September 9–13	The 20th anniversary week of The Price Is Right is celebrated during this week on CBS.
September 9	After being fired from World Championship Wrestling following a contract dispute, Ric Flair makes his World Wrestling Federation debut on USA Network's Prime Time Wrestling with the "Big Gold Belt".
September 19	Michael Jackson (credited as John Jay Smith) guest voices on Fox's The Simpsons.
September 19	Univision broadcasts the final of the 14th National OTI Festival live from the Gusman Center for the Performing Arts in Miami.
September 23	Over a year after its cancelation from NBC, Baywatch is relaunched in first–run syndication, where it will run for ten seasons.
September 25	Leonardo DiCaprio joins the cast of the ABC sitcom Growing Pains for what would be its final season.
September 29	Nirvana's "Smells Like Teen Spirit" video debuts on MTV's 120 Minutes.
October 6	On the Major League Baseball Game of the Week on CBS, the Atlanta Braves cap off their "worst to first" season by defeating the Houston Astros to clinch their first divisional title in nine years.
October 11	Redd Foxx suffers a fatal heart attack on the set of the CBS sitcom The Royal Family. It was noted that initially cast mates on set thought Foxx was only fooling around after he clutched a chair and fell to the floor, since his character on Sanford and Son often faked heart attacks.
October 13	Jennifer Lopez joins the cast as one of the Fly Girls on the Fox sketch comedy series In Living Color (she would leave the show after the next season). Other cast additions include future Academy Award winner Jamie Foxx and Steve Park (who left after the season ended). Shawn Wayans, the original DJ for the show, also becomes a regular cast member (and will remain in the cast until the end of the next season). Wayans' original DJ role is assumed by Twist.
October 19–27	The World Series between the Minnesota Twins and Atlanta Braves airs on CBS. With five of its games decided by a single run, four decided in the final at-bat, and three going into extra innings, this World Series immediately became regarded as one of the greatest postseason series in baseball history. In 2003, ESPN selected this championship as the "Greatest of All Time" in their "World Series 100th Anniversary" countdown. The Series telecast drew an overall national Nielsen rating of 24.0 and a 39 share for CBS; Game 7 drew a 32.2 rating and 49 share.
October 20–22	ABC airs the four-hour miniseries Dynasty: The Reunion, which continues the story of 1981–1989 prime time soap opera Dynasty.
October 24	Star Trek creator Gene Roddenberry dies at the age of 70. After his death, Star Trek: The Next Generation airs a two-part episode of season five, called "Unification", which features a dedication to Roddenberry.
October 25	NBC's affiliate in Raleigh/Durham/Fayetteville, WPTF-TV, changes its name to WRDC-TV.
October 26	In front of a national television audience on CBS, play-by-play man Jack Buck famously says "And we'll see you tomorrow night!" while calling Minnesota Twins star Kirby Puckett's game-winning home run to send the World Series against the Atlanta Braves to a decisive seventh game.
October 29	Turner Broadcasting System and Apollo Investment Fund purchase the Hanna-Barbera library for $320 million.
October 31	KLSR-TV in Eugene, Oregon signs-on, giving Fox a full-power home in the Eugene market. Sister station K25AS (now MyNetworkTV affiliate KEVU-CD) becomes an independent station before joining UPN in 1995.
November 4–11	Leonard Nimoy guest stars as Spock in a two-part episode of Star Trek: The Next Generation. The first of the two episodes earn a 15.4 household Nielsen rating, drawing over 25 million viewers, making it one of the most watched episodes in all seven seasons of The Next Generation's run.
November 6	The fourth installment of the Gambler film series is broadcast on NBC. The Gambler Returns: The Luck of the Draw features Kenny Rogers' character Brady Hawkes running across a galaxy of old TV western characters played by the original actors. This includes Gene Barry as Bat Masterson, Hugh O'Brian as Wyatt Earp, Jack Kelly as Bart Maverick, Clint Walker as Cheyenne Bodie, David Carradine as Kung Fu's Caine, Chuck Connors and Johnny Crawford from The Rifleman, Brian Keith as The Westerner, James Drury and Doug McClure from The Virginian, Paul Brinegar from Rawhide, and Reba McEntire as Burgundy Jones.
November 7	In a nationally televised press conference, NBA superstar Magic Johnson announces that he is HIV-positive and is retiring from the Los Angeles Lakers, effective immediately. Johnson would appear as a guest on The Arsenio Hall Show the very next night.
November 9	Hurricane Saturday, a one-off programming block of a three-way, two-hour crossover event airs on NBC. It involves three television sitcoms created by Susan Harris: The Golden Girls, Empty Nest and Nurses. The event depicts a fictional hurricane storming into the storylines of the three series set in Miami, Florida.
November 14	The music video for "Black or White", the first single from Michael Jackson's forthcoming eighth album Dangerous, is first televised by Fox. Despite controversy over the video's ending, Fox, which simulcasts the video along with MTV, VH1, and BET, scores its highest Nielsen ratings to date.
November 16	Ellen Cleghorne, Melanie Hutsell and Beth Cahill join the cast of NBC's Saturday Night Live.
November 16	KTMF in Missoula, Montana signs-on the air, giving the Missoula market its first full-time ABC affiliate.
November 23	An hour long television special commemorating the 19th anniversary of The Bob Newhart Show airs on CBS.
November 28	E.T. the Extra-Terrestrial makes its broadcast network television premiere on CBS.
December 1	Britney Spears appears on the program Star Search.
December 8	Tim Russert becomes moderator of the NBC discussion program Meet the Press, a job he possesses until his sudden death in 2008.
December 14	Guest host Steve Martin kicks off NBC's Saturday Night Live by singing "Not Gonna Phone It In Tonight!".

== Programs ==
=== Debuts ===
Date	Show	Network
January 4	Sons and Daughters	CBS
January 6	Expose	NBC
January 7	The Party Machine with Nia Peeples	Syndication
January 7	Talk Soup	E!
January 7	Under Cover	ABC
January 10	Good Sports	CBS
January 12	Roggin's Heroes	Syndication
January 13	Harry and the Hendersons	Syndication
January 13	Dark Shadows (reboot)	NBC
January 27	Davis Rules	ABC
February 3	Fifteen	Nickelodeon
February 3	Sunday Best	NBC
February 9	The Adventures of Pete & Pete	Nickelodeon
February 16	Welcome Freshmen	Nickelodeon
February 25	The Pirates of Dark Water	ABC
March 1	Clarissa Explains it All	Nickelodeon
March 1	Toxic Crusaders	USA Network
March 7	Yearbook	Fox
March 8	Baby Talk	ABC
March 11	Studs	Syndication
March 12	Eddie Dodd	ABC
March 18	Get the Picture	Nickelodeon
March 26	The Antagonists	CBS
March 29	True Detectives	CBS
March 31	The 100 Lives of Black Jack Savage	NBC
March 31	Darkwing Duck	Syndication and ABC
April 3	Scene of the Crime	CBS
April 4	Fly by Night	CBS
April 5	Dark Justice	CBS
April 7	Top of the Heap	Fox
April 24	My Life and Times	ABC
April 26	Dinosaurs	ABC
April 28	The Sunday Comics	Fox
April 30	The Statler Brothers Show	The Nashville Network
May 1	The Littl' Bits	Nickelodeon
May 2	American Detective	ABC
May 11	Sisters	NBC
June 4	C. Everett Koop, M.D.	NBC
June 19	The Man in the Family	ABC
June 24	Johnny B. On the Loose	Syndication
July 4	Salute Your Shorts	Nickelodeon
July 8	Shop 'til You Drop	Lifetime
July 8	The Montel Williams Show	Syndication
July 19	Hi Honey, I'm Home!	ABC
August 11	Doug	Nickelodeon
August 11	Rugrats	Nickelodeon
August 11	The Ren & Stimpy Show	Nickelodeon
August 17	Best of the Worst	Fox
August 25	Roc	Fox
August 31	What Would You Do?	Nickelodeon
September 1	Aeon Flux	MTV
September 1	That's My Dog	The Family Channel
September 1	E! News	E!
September 2	Nickelodeon Launch Box	Nickelodeon
September 3	The Legend of Prince Valiant	The Family Channel
September 3	Little Dracula	Fox Kids
September 7	Back to the Future: The Animated Series	CBS
September 7	Little Shop	Fox Kids
September 7	Taz-Mania	Fox Kids
September 8	Herman's Head	Fox
September 8	Bucky O'Hare and the Toad Wars	Syndication
September 9	The Chuck Woolery Show	Syndication
September 9	The Maury Povich Show	Syndication
September 9	Now It Can Be Told	Syndication
September 9	Realities with David Hartman	Syndication
September 9	The Adventures of Mark & Brian	NBC
September 14	Chip and Pepper	NBC
September 14	Nurses	NBC
September 14	Super Mario World	NBC
September 14	Wish Kid	NBC
September 14	Space Cats	NBC
September 14	Yo Yogi!	NBC
September 14	ProStars	NBC
September 14	Hammerman	ABC
September 14	The Pirates of Dark Water	ABC
September 14	Mother Goose and Grimm	CBS
September 14	Where's Wally?: The Animated Series	CBS
September 15	P.S. I Luv U	CBS
September 15	Eerie, Indiana	NBC
September 15	Man of the People	NBC
September 15	Pacific Station	NBC
September 16	James Bond Jr.	Syndication
September 16	The Jenny Jones Show	Syndication
September 16	Walter & Emily	NBC
September 17	Home Improvement	ABC
September 17	Sibs	ABC
September 18	The Royal Family	CBS
September 18	Teech	CBS
September 19	Drexell's Class	Fox
September 19	Flesh 'n' Blood	NBC
September 19	Reasonable Doubts	NBC
September 20	Brooklyn Bridge	CBS
September 20	Step by Step	ABC
September 21	The Torkelsons	NBC
September 24	Homefront	ABC
September 25	Good & Evil	ABC
September 26	FBI: The Untold Stories	ABC
September 27	Investigative Reports	A&E
September 27	Princesses	CBS
September 28	The Commish	ABC
September 29	Street Justice	Syndication
September 30	The Jerry Springer Show	Syndication
September 30	Charlie Rose	PBS
September 30	Where in the World is Carmen Sandiego	PBS
October 4	Beyond Reality	Syndication
October 7	I'll Fly Away	NBC
October 17	Sightings	Fox
October 18	Palace Guard	CBS
November 4	NBC News Nightside	NBC
November 7	Silk Stalkings	CBS
November 24	Hot Country Nights	NBC
November 30	Liquid Television	MTV
December 17	A Bunch of Munsch	Showtime
Unknown date	Return to the Sea	PBS

=== Returning this year ===
Show	Last aired	Previous network	New network	Returning
The $100,000 Pyramid	1988	Syndication	same	January 7
Seinfeld	1990	NBC	same	January 23
In Concert	1975	ABC	Same	June 7
You Asked for It	1959	ABC	The Family Channel	September 1
Beetlejuice: The Animated Series	1990	ABC	Fox Kids	September 9
Candid Camera	1988	CBS	Syndication	September 16
A Different World	1990	NBC	Same	September 19
Baywatch	1990	NBC	Syndication	September 23

=== Entering syndication this year ===
A list of programs (current or canceled) that have accumulated enough episodes (between 65 and 100) or seasons (3 or more) to be eligible for off-network syndication and/or basic cable runs.

Show	Seasons
A Different World	4
Married... with Children	4
Full House	4

=== Changes of network affiliation ===
The following shows aired new episodes on a different network than previous first-run episodes:

Show	Moved from	Moved To
Bill and Ted's Excellent Adventures	CBS	Fox Kids
Beetlejuice	ABC	Fox Kids
Tom and Jerry Kids	TBS	Fox Kids
Baywatch	NBC	Syndication
Candid Camera	CBS	Syndication

=== Ending this year ===
Date	Show	Debut
January 1	American Chronicles	1990
January 5	Haywire	1990
January 19	Zazoo U	1990
January 25	Attitudes	1985
January 25	Generations	1989
January 25	Piggsburg Pigs!	1990
February 3	Good Grief	1990
February 11	About Face	1989
February 16	The Fanelli Boys	1990
February 22	Disney's Adventures of the Gummi Bears	1985
March 1	Sons and Daughters	1991
March 8	The Joker's Wild (returned in 2017)	1972
March 8	Going Places	1990
March 9	Lenny	1990
March 9	Uncle Buck	1990
March 16	Married People	1990
March 17	Bordertown	1989
April 5	Against the Law	1990
April 12	Fun House	1988
April 26	Hunter	1984
April 27	21 Jump Street	1987
May 3	Dallas	1978
May 4	Yearbook	1991
May 8	The Days and Nights of Molly Dodd	1987
May 10	Paradise	1988
May 10	Midnight Caller	1988
May 11	Swamp Thing	1990
May 18	The Flash	1990
May 19	Babes	1990
May 25	The Munsters Today	1988
May 25	Out of This World	1987
May 28	Thirtysomething	1987
June 1	DEA	1990
June 6	Gabriel's Fire	1990
June 10	Twin Peaks	1990
June 12	Over My Dead Body	1990
June 22	American Dreamer	1990
June 25	Head of the Class	1986
June 30	C. Everett Koop, M.D.	1991
July 6	Doctor Doctor	1989
July 12	Match Game (returned in 1998)	1962
July 14	Lifestories	1990
July 17	The Family Man	1990
July 20	Carol & Company	1990
July 20	The Hogan Family	1986
July 22	China Beach	1988
July 27	Amen	1986
August 8	TaleSpin	1990
August 11	Ferris Bueller	1990
August 11	Parenthood	1990
August 17	A Pup Named Scooby-Doo	1988
August 30	The Challengers	1990
August 30	Hey Dude	1989
August 31	Dink, The Little Dinosaur	1989
August 31	Kid 'n Play	1990
September 6	Trump Card	1990
September 10	Peter Pan and the Pirates	1991
September 15	The Party Machine with Nia Peeples	1991
September 16	Adam-12	1990
September 20	Concentration	1958
October 5	The Real Ghostbusters	1986
October 16	Teech	1991
October 25	Princesses	1991
October 26	Captain N: The Game Master	1989
October 26	The New Adventures of Winnie the Pooh	1988
October 30	Good & Evil	1991
November 1	Palace Guard	1991
November 2	Muppet Babies (returned in 2018)	1984
November 10	Eureeka's Castle	1989
November 15	Flesh 'n' Blood	1991
November 16	Bill & Ted's Excellent Adventures	1990
November 23	Attack of the Killer Tomatoes	1990
November 30	Little Shop	1991
December 1	Bucky O'Hare and the Toad Wars	1991
December 2	Peter Pan and the Pirates	1990
December 6	Pyramid (returned in 2002)	1973
December 6	Beetlejuice	1989
December 6	Get the Picture	1991
December 7	Hammerman	1991
December 7	Super Mario World	1991
December 7	Wish Kid	1991
December 7	Yo Yogi!	1991
December 8	The Adventures of Don Coyote and Sancho Panda	1990
December 14	Where's Wally?: The Animated Series	1991
December 27	Chain Reaction (returned in 2006)	1980
December 29	Make the Grade	1989

=== Made-for-TV movies and miniseries ===
Title	Channel	Premiere
Sarah, Plain and Tall	CBS	February 3
The Josephine Baker Story	HBO	March 16
Separate but Equal	ABC	April 7
Switched at Birth	NBC	April 28
Knight Rider 2000	NBC	May 19
C. Everett Koop, M.D.	NBC	June 4
A Woman Named Jackie	NBC	October 13

== Networks and services ==
=== Launches ===
Network	Type	Launch date	Notes	Source
The California Channel	Cable and satellite television	February 4		
ValueVision	Cable and satellite television	March 12		
Encore	Cable television	April 1		
TV Japan	Cable television	April 1		
CNN Airport	Cable and satellite television	June 3		
Foxnet	Cable and satellite television	June 6		
Court TV	Cable television	July 1		
HBO 2	Cable television	August 1		
HBO 3	Cable television	August 1		

=== Conversions and rebrandings ===
Old network name	New network name	Type	Conversion Date	Notes	Source
The Comedy Channel; Ha!	Comedy Central	Cable television	April 1		
SuperStation TBS	TBS	Cable television	Unknown		

=== Closures ===
Network	Type	Closure date	Notes	Source
Star Television Network	Broadcast television	January 14		
Financial News Network	Cable television	May 21		
Mizlou Television Network	Syndicated programming block	Unknown		
Universal Pictures Debut Network	Syndicated programming block	Unknown		

== Television stations ==
=== Station launches ===
Date	City of License/Market	Station	Channel	Affiliation	Notes/Ref.
January 11	Palm Beach, Florida	W16AR	16	Independent	
February 4	Evansville, Indiana	W52AZ	52	Independent	
March 2	Hammond, Indiana (Chicago, Illinois)	WJYS	62	Independent	
March 8	Boise, Idaho	KTMW	9	HSN	
March 15	Atlanta, Georgia	WHSG-TV	63	HSN	
May 3	Tampa, Florida	WBSV-TV	50	Independent	
May 23	Augusta, Georgia	WFXG	54	Fox	
May 29	Jacksonville, Florida	WJEB-TV	59	TBN	
June 15	Eagle Pass, Texas	KVAW	24	Telemundo	
June 22	El Paso, Texas	KJLF-TV	65	Independent	
July 19	New York City	W51BV	51	The Box	
August	Auburn, Indiana	W07CL	7	Main Street TV	
August	Bayamón, Puerto Rico	WDWL	36	Religious independent	
August 11	Baton Rouge, Louisiana	WGMB	44	Fox	
August 31	San Francisco, California	KMTP-TV	32	Non-commercial independent	
September 1	Nacogdoches, Texas	KYTX	19	NBC	Satellite/translator of KETK-TV/Tyler, Texas
September 1	Lufkin, Texas	K53IQ	53	NBC	Satellite/translator of KETK-TV/Tyler, Texas
September 6	Llano/Austin, Texas	KLNO	14	NBC	
September 15	Holly Springs, Mississippi (Memphis, Tennessee)	WBUY-TV	40	HSN	
October 7	Washington, D.C.	NewsChannel 8	8 (cable-only)	Independent	
October 31	Eugene, Oregon	KEVU	34	Fox	
November 16	Missoula, Montana	KTMF	23	ABC	
November 29	Evansville, Indiana	W56DN	56	Telemundo	
December 1	Yauco, Puerto Rico	WIRS	42	Independent	Satellite of WJPX-TV/San Juan
December 16	Davenport, Iowa	KQCT	36	PBS	Part of the Iowa Public Television network
December 24	Indiana, Pennsylvania	W49BT	49	America One	
Unknown date	Columbia, Missouri	K38II	38	unknown	
Unknown date	Huron, South Dakota	KTTM	12	Fox	Satellite of KTTW/Sioux Falls
Unknown date	Natchez, Mississippi	WNTZ-TV	33	Fox	Returned to the air after a three-year hiatus
Unknown date	St. Louis, Missouri	K18BT	18	TBN	
Unknown date	St. Louis, Missouri	K58DH	58	The Box	

=== Network affiliation changes ===
Date	City of License/Market	Station	Channel	Old affiliation	New affiliation	Notes/Ref.
January 5	Homewood, Alabama (Birmingham/Tuscaloosa/Anniston)	WTTO	21	Independent	Fox	
May 23	Augusta, Georgia	W67BE	67	Fox	Independent	

=== Station closures ===
Date	City of license/Market	Station	Channel	Affiliation	Sign-on date	Notes
December	Pago Pago, American Samoa	KVZK-5	5	NBC	October 5, 1964	

== Births ==
Date	Name	Notability
January 4	Charles Melton	Actor (Riverdale) and model
January 4	Olivia Tennet	New Zealand actress (Power Rangers RPM)
January 14	Ryan Coleman	Actor (All That)
January 17	Willa Fitzgerald	Actress (Alpha House, Scream, Dare Me)
January 18	Britt McKillip	Canadian voice actress (Baby Looney Tunes, Sabrina's Secret Life, Coconut Fred's Fruit Salad Island)
January 19	Erin Sanders	Actress (Zoey 101, The Young and the Restless, Big Time Rush)
January 20	Ciara Hanna	Actress (Power Rangers Megaforce)
January 28	C. J. Harris	Singer (American Idol) (d. 2023)
January 28	Calum Worthy	Canadian actor (Austin & Ally, American Vandal, The Act, Utopia)
February 3	Glenn McCuen	Actor (Bucket & Skinner's Epic Adventures)
February 7	Gabbie Hanna	Actress
February 10	Emma Roberts	Actress (Unfabulous, Scream Queens) and daughter of Eric Roberts
February 12	Tanaya Beatty	Actress (The Night Shift)
February 16	Micah Stephen Williams	Actor (Good Luck Charlie)
February 17	Ed Sheeran	English singer
February 17	Jeremy Allen White	Actor (Shameless, The Bear)
February 18	Malese Jow	Actress (Unfabulous, The Vampire Diaries), singer
February 25	Tony Oller	Actor (As the Bell Rings, Gigantic)
March 5	Hanna Mangan-Lawrence	Australian actress (Bed of Roses)
March 8	Devon Werkheiser	Actor (Ned's Declassified School Survival Guide)
March 16	Wolfgang Van Halen	Musician (Van Halen)
March 19	Garrett Clayton	Actor, singer and dancer
March 25	Seychelle Gabriel	Actress (Falling Skies, The Legend of Korra)
March 27	Gilbert Leal	Voice actor (Rocket Power)
March 28	Amy Bruckner	Actress (Phil of the Future, American Dragon: Jake Long)
March 29	Hayley McFarland	Actress (Lie to Me, Sons of Anarchy)
April 3	Hayley Kiyoko	Actress (CSI: Cyber) and singer
April 4	Jamie Lynn Spears	Actress (All That, Zoey 101) and sister of Britney Spears
April 5	Hunter March	Actor
April 8	Cameron Deane Stewart	Actor
April 10	AJ Michalka	Actress (The Guardian, The Goldbergs, Steven Universe, She-Ra and the Princesses of Power), singer and guitarist
April 10	Conor Leslie	Actress
April 21	Frank Dillane	English actor (Fear the Walking Dead)
April 23	Caleb Johnson	Singer (American Idol)
April 28	Aleisha Allen	Actress (Blue's Clues, Out of the Box)
April 28	Cheslie Kryst	Presenter
May 1	Creagen Dow	Actor (Zoey 101)
May 10	Jordan Francis	Canadian voice actor (Custard on The Save-Ums!)
May 12	Jennifer Damiano	Actress and singer
May 13	Jake Borelli	Actor
May 14	C.J. Manigo	Actor (Dude, What Would Happen)
May 17	Daniel Curtis Lee	Actor (Ned's Declassified School Survival Guide, Zeke and Luther) and rapper
May 17	Jill Duggar Dillard	Actress (19 Kids and Counting, Counting On) and television personality
May 24	Sarah Ramos	Actress (American Dreams, Runaway, Parenthood)
May 26	Julianna Rose Mauriello	Actress (Stephanie on LazyTown (2004–08))
May 29	Kristen Alderson	Actress (One Life to Live, General Hospital)
June 4	Quincy	Actor (Star)
June 4	Jordan Danger	Actress (Eureka)
June 7	Poppy Drayton	English actress (The Shannara Chronicles)
June 7	India Oxenberg	Actress
June 12	Louisa Gummer	American model and daughter of Meryl Streep and Don Gummer
June 18	Willa Holland	Actress (The O.C., Gossip Girl, Arrow)
June 24	Max Ehrich	Actor (The Young and the Restless, Under the Dome, 100 Things to Do Before High School)
June 27	Madylin Sweeten	Actress (Ally on Everybody Loves Raymond)
June 28	Daniel Zovatto	Actor
June 29	Tajja Isen	Canadian voice actress (The Save-Ums!, JoJo's Circus, Atomic Betty, Time Warp Trio, Super Why!)
July 3	Grant Rosenmeyer	Actor (Oliver Beene)
July 5	Jason Dolley	Actor (Complete Savages, Cory in the House, Good Luck Charlie) and musician
July 9	Mitchel Musso	Actor (Hannah Montana, Pair of Kings), voice actor (Phineas and Ferb, Milo Murphy's Law)
July 11	Kelsey Impicciche	YouTube personality, actress and singer
July 12	Erik Per Sullivan	Actor (Malcolm in the Middle)
July 15	Emily Roeske	Actress (Halloweentown)
July 16	Alexandra Shipp	Actress (House of Anubis)
July 24	Emily Bett Rickards	Actress (Arrow)
July 27	Adam Page	Pro wrestler
July 29	Maestro Harrell	Actor (Guys Like Us, The Wire, Suburgatory)
July 29	Miki Ishikawa	Actress (Zoey 101)
August 2	Skyler Day	Actress (Gigantic, Parenthood) and singer
August 5	John Reynolds	Actor
August 9	Alexa Bliss	Pro wrestler (WWE, Total Divas)
August 12	Lakeith Stanfield	Actor (Atlanta)
August 17	Austin Butler	Actor (Ned's Declassified School Survival Guide, Zoey 101, Ruby & The Rockits, Life Unexpected, Switched at Birth, The Carrie Diaries, The Shannara Chronicles)
August 18	Richard Harmon	Canadian actor (The 100)
August 21	Christian Navarro	Actor (13 Reasons Why)
August 26	Dylan O'Brien	Actor (Teen Wolf)
August 27	Kasha Kropinski	Actress
August 28	Jonathan Whitesell	Canadian actor (The 100, Beyond)
August 28	Kyle Massey	Actor (That's So Raven, Cory in the House, Fish Hooks, Mighty Magiswords) and rapper
August 28	Samuel Larsen	Actor (Glee)
August 30	Gaia Weiss	French-American actress (Vikings)
September 3	Samantha Marie Ware	Actress
September 4	Carter Jenkins	Actor (Unfabulous, Famous in Love)
September 7	Jennifer Veal	English actress (Descendants: Wicked World)
September 9	Kelsey Asbille	Actress (One Tree Hill, Pair of Kings, Teen Wolf)
September 15	Mike Perry	Martial artist
September 20	Spencer Locke	Actress
September 22	Chelsea Tavares	Actress (Unfabulous, Just Jordan)
October 5	Jackson Rogow	Actor (Dude, What Would Happen)
October 6	Roshon Fegan	Actor (Shake It Up) and singer
October 18	Tyler Posey	Actor (Doc, Brothers & Sisters, Teen Wolf, Elena of Avalor, Jane the Virgin, Scream)
October 27	Bryan Craig	Actor (Bucket & Skinner's Epic Adventures, General Hospital, Valor)
November 1	Anthony Ramos	Actor
November 6	Pierson Fodé	Actor (The Bold and the Beautiful)
November 8	Riker Lynch	Actor (Glee) and singer (R5)
November 11	Emma Blackery	Actress, singer and YouTube personality
November 11	Christa B. Allen	Actress (Cake, Revenge)
November 13	Devon Bostick	Canadian actor (The 100)
November 13	Matt Bennett	Actor (Victorious)
November 14	Graham Patrick Martin	Actor
November 15	Shailene Woodley	Actress (The Secret Life of the American Teenager)
November 18	Rory Thost	Voice actor (Kip on Higglytown Heroes)
December 1	Olivia Grace Applegate	Actress
December 2	Charlie Puth	Singer and actor
December 12	Wallis Currie-Wood	Actress (Madam Secretary)
December 15	Eunice Cho	Actress (Little Bill)
December 19	Keiynan Lonsdale	Australian actor (The Flash)
December 19	Libe Barer	American actress
December 20	Hunter Gomez	Actor (National Treasure)
December 20	Jillian Rose Reed	Actress (Awkward, Elena of Avalor)
December 24	Louis Tomlinson	English actor (One Direction) and singer
December 26	Eden Sher	Actress (The Middle, Star vs. the Forces of Evil)
December 27	Chloe Bridges	Actress (Freddie, The Carrie Diaries)

== Deaths ==
Date	Name	Age	Notability
January 8	Steve Clark	31	English musician (Def Leppard)
January 12	Keye Luke	86	Character actor (Kung Fu)
February 1	Jimmy MacDonald	84	Voice actor (Mickey Mouse)
February 3	Harry Ackerman	78	Producer (Bewitched)
February 3	Nancy Kulp	69	Actress (Miss Jane Hathaway on The Beverly Hillbillies)
February 6	Danny Thomas	79	Actor and comedian (Danny Williams on Make Room for Daddy)
February 24	John Charles Daly	77	News journalist and game show host (What's My Line?)
February 24	George Gobel	71	Comedian (The George Gobel Show)
March 3	Vance Colvig	72	Actor (Bozo the Clown on KTLA in Los Angeles)
April 10	Kevin Peter Hall	35	Actor (Misfits of Science, 227, Harry and the Hendersons)
April 10	Natalie Schafer	90	Actress (Lovey Howell on Gilligan's Island)
April 23	William Dozier	83	Producer (Batman)
April 28	Ken Curtis	74	Singer and actor (Festus Haggin on Gunsmoke)
June 9	Joe Hamilton	62	Producer (The Carol Burnett Show, Mama's Family), former husband of Carol Burnett
July 1	Michael Landon	54	Actor and producer (Bonanza, Little House on the Prairie, Highway to Heaven)
July 15	Bert Convy	57	Game show host (Super Password and Win, Lose Or Draw)
July 21	Theodore Wilson	47	Character actor (Good Times, That's My Mama)
August 6	Harry Reasoner	68	News anchor/reporter (60 Minutes)
August 22	Colleen Dewhurst	67	Actress (Murphy Brown, Avonlea)
September 4	Tom Tryon	65	Actor (Texas John Slaughter)
September 7	Ben Piazza	57	Actor (Dallas)
September 15	John Hoyt	85	Actor (Gimme a Break!)
October 9	Thalmus Rasulala	51	Actor (Roots, What's Happening!!)
October 11	Redd Foxx	68	Comedian and actor (Fred Sanford on Sanford and Son)
October 24	Gene Roddenberry	70	Creator of (Star Trek)
November 2	Irwin Allen	75	Producer (Lost in Space)
November 5	Fred MacMurray	83	Actor (Steve Douglas on My Three Sons)
November 24	Eric Carr	41	Drummer (Kiss)
November 24	Freddie Mercury	45	British singer (Queen)

== See also ==
- 1991 in the United States
- List of American films of 1991
