= 1990–91 United States network television schedule =

The 1990–91 network television schedule for the four major English language commercial broadcast networks in the United States covers primetime hours from September 1990 through August 1991. The schedule is followed by a list per network of returning series, new series, and series cancelled after the 1989–90 season.

Beginning this season, Fox began broadcasting on Thursdays and Fridays.

PBS is not included; member stations have local flexibility over most of their schedules and broadcast times for network shows may vary.

New series are highlighted in bold.

All times are U.S. Eastern Time and Pacific Time (except for some live sports or events). Subtract one hour for Central, Mountain, Alaska and Hawaii–Aleutian times.

Each of the 30 highest-rated shows is listed with its rank and rating as determined by Nielsen Media Research.

== Legend ==
- Light blue indicates local programming.
- Gray indicates encore programming.
- Blue-gray indicates news programming.
- Light green indicates sporting events.
- Red indicates series being burned off and other regularly scheduled programs, including specials and movies.
- Lime indicates the number-one most-watched program of the season.
- Yellow indicates the top-10 most watched programs of the season.
- Cyan indicates the top-20 most watched programs of the season.
- Magenta indicates the top-30 most watched programs of the season.

== Sunday ==
Network		7:00 p.m.	7:30 p.m.	8:00 p.m.	8:30 p.m.	9:00 p.m.	9:30 p.m.	10:00 p.m.	10:30 p.m.
ABC		Life Goes On		America's Funniest Home Videos (7/17.0)	**America's Funniest People** (9/16.7) (Tied with Designing Women and Empty Nest)	The ABC Sunday Night Movie			
CBS	Fall	60 Minutes (2/20.5)		Murder, She Wrote (13/16.4)		CBS Sunday Movie (21/14.8) (Tied with Who's the Boss?, Doogie Howser, M.D. and L.A. Law)			
CBS	Winter	60 Minutes (2/20.5)		Murder, She Wrote (13/16.4)		CBS Sunday Movie (21/14.8) (Tied with Who's the Boss?, Doogie Howser, M.D. and L.A. Law)			
CBS	Spring	60 Minutes (2/20.5)		Murder, She Wrote (13/16.4)		CBS Sunday Movie (21/14.8) (Tied with Who's the Boss?, Doogie Howser, M.D. and L.A. Law)			
CBS	Summer	60 Minutes (2/20.5)		All in the Family (R)	**Sunday Dinner**	Murder, She Wrote (R)		The Trials of Rosie O'Neill	
CBS	Mid-summer	60 Minutes (2/20.5)		Murder, She Wrote (R)		CBS Sunday Movie (21/14.8) (Tied with Who's the Boss?, Doogie Howser, M.D. and L.A. Law)			
Fox	Fall	**True Colors**	Parker Lewis Can't Lose	In Living Color	**Get a Life**	Married... with Children	**Good Grief**	Against the Law	
Fox	Mid-fall	**True Colors**	Parker Lewis Can't Lose	In Living Color	**Get a Life**	Married... with Children	**Good Grief**	Comic Strip: Live	
Fox	Winter	**True Colors**	**Parker Lewis Can't Lose**	In Living Color	**Get a Life**	Married... with Children	**Good Grief**	**Comic Strip: Live**	
Fox	Late winter	**True Colors**	Parker Lewis Can't Lose	In Living Color	**Get a Life**	Married... with Children	Various programming	Comic Strip: Live	
Fox	Spring	**True Colors**	Parker Lewis Can't Lose	In Living Color	**Get a Life**	Married... with Children	**Top of the Heap**	The Sunday Comics	
Fox	Summer	**True Colors**	Parker Lewis Can't Lose	In Living Color	**Get a Life**	Married... with Children	Married... with Children (R)	The Sunday Comics	
NBC	Fall	**Hull High**		**Lifestories**		NBC Sunday Night Movie			
NBC	Winter	**Sunday Best**		Real Life with Jane Pauley	**Expose**	NBC Sunday Night Movie			
NBC	Spring	**The 100 Lives of Black Jack Savage**		**Expose**	Real Life with Jane Pauley	NBC Sunday Night Movie			
NBC	Summer	**Lifestories**		**Expose**	Real Life with Jane Pauley	NBC Sunday Night Movie			
NBC	Mid-summer	Special programming		**Expose**	Real Life with Jane Pauley	NBC Sunday Night Movie			
NBC	Late summer	**Ferris Bueller**	Parenthood	**Expose**	Real Life with Jane Pauley	NBC Sunday Night Movie			

Note: All in the Family consisted in assorted episodes of the 1970s series.

== Monday ==
Network		8:00 p.m.	8:30 p.m.	9:00 p.m.	9:30 p.m.	10:00 p.m.	10:30 p.m.
ABC	Fall	MacGyver		Monday Night Football (6/17.2)			
ABC	Winter	MacGyver		The ABC Monday Night Movie			
ABC	Spring	MacGyver		The ABC Monday Night Movie			
ABC	Summer	MacGyver		The ABC Monday Night Movie			
CBS	Fall	**Uncle Buck**	Major Dad (20/14.9)	Murphy Brown (8/16.9)	Designing Women (9/16.7) (Tied with Empty Nest and **America's Funniest People**)	**The Trials of Rosie O'Neill**	
CBS	Mid-fall	**Evening Shade**	Major Dad (20/14.9)	Murphy Brown (8/16.9)	Designing Women (9/16.7) (Tied with Empty Nest and **America's Funniest People**)	**The Trials of Rosie O'Neill**	
CBS	Winter	**Evening Shade**	Major Dad (20/14.9)	Murphy Brown (8/16.9)	Designing Women (9/16.7) (Tied with Empty Nest and **America's Funniest People**)	**The Trials of Rosie O'Neill**	
CBS	Spring	**Evening Shade**	Major Dad (20/14.9)	Murphy Brown (8/16.9)	Designing Women (9/16.7) (Tied with Empty Nest and **America's Funniest People**)	Northern Exposure	
CBS	Summer	Major Dad (R)	**The Family Man**	Murphy Brown (8/16.9)	**Evening Shade** (R)	Northern Exposure	
CBS	Mid-summer	**Evening Shade** (R)	Major Dad (R)	Murphy Brown (8/16.9)	Designing Women (R)	Northern Exposure	
Fox		Fox Night at the Movies				Local programming	
NBC	Fall	**The Fresh Prince of Bel-Air**	**Ferris Bueller**	NBC Monday Night at the Movies			
NBC	Winter	**The Fresh Prince of Bel-Air**	**Blossom**	NBC Monday Night at the Movies			
NBC	Spring	**The Fresh Prince of Bel-Air**	**Blossom**	NBC Monday Night at the Movies			
NBC	Summer	**The Fresh Prince of Bel-Air**	**Blossom**	NBC Monday Night at the Movies			
NBC	Mid-summer	**The Fresh Prince of Bel-Air**	A Different World (R)	NBC Monday Night at the Movies			
NBC	Late summer	**The Fresh Prince of Bel-Air**	**Blossom** (R)	NBC Monday Night at the Movies			

Note: On CBS, Face to Face with Connie Chung was to have aired 10-11 p.m., but it was replaced by The Trials of Rosie O'Neill at the last minute due to Connie Chung's personal health commitments.

== Tuesday ==
Network		8:00 p.m.	8:30 p.m.	9:00 p.m.	9:30 p.m.	10:00 p.m.	10:30 p.m.
ABC	Fall	Who's the Boss? (21/14.8) (Tied with Doogie Howser, M.D., L.A. Law and the CBS Sunday Movie)	Head of the Class (26/14.4)	Roseanne (3/18.2)	Coach (17/15.5) (Tied with Matlock)	Thirtysomething	
ABC	Winter	Who's the Boss? (21/14.8) (Tied with Doogie Howser, M.D., L.A. Law and the CBS Sunday Movie)	**Davis Rules** (30/14.0) (Tied with **Baby Talk**)	Roseanne (3/18.2)	Coach (17/15.5) (Tied with Matlock)	Thirtysomething	
ABC	Spring	Who's the Boss? (21/14.8) (Tied with Doogie Howser, M.D., L.A. Law and the CBS Sunday Movie)	**Davis Rules** (30/14.0) (Tied with **Baby Talk**)	Roseanne (3/18.2)	Coach (17/15.5) (Tied with Matlock)	**Eddie Dodd**	
ABC	Mid-spring	**Baby Talk** (30/14.0) (Tied with **Davis Rules**)	Who's the Boss? (21/14.8) (Tied with Doogie Howser, M.D., L.A. Law and the CBS Sunday Movie)	Roseanne (3/18.2)	**Stat**	Thirtysomething	
ABC	Summer	Who's the Boss? (R)	Head of the Class	Roseanne (3/18.2)	Coach (R)	China Beach	
ABC	Mid-summer	Who's the Boss? (R)	**Davis Rules** (R)	Roseanne (3/18.2)	Coach (R)	Thirtysomething (R)	
ABC	Late summer	Full House (R)	Who's the Boss? (R)	Roseanne (3/18.2)	Coach (R)	Thirtysomething (R)	
CBS		Rescue 911 (29/14.1)		CBS Tuesday Night Movie			
NBC	Fall	Matlock (17/15.5) (Tied with Coach)		In the Heat of the Night (19/15.2)		Various programming	
NBC	Mid-fall	Matlock (17/15.5) (Tied with Coach)		In the Heat of the Night (19/15.2)		**Law & Order**	
NBC	Winter	Matlock (17/15.5) (Tied with Coach)		In the Heat of the Night (19/15.2)		**Law & Order**	
NBC	Spring	Matlock (17/15.5) (Tied with Coach)		In the Heat of the Night (19/15.2)		Shannon's Deal	
NBC	Summer	Matlock (17/15.5) (Tied with Coach)		In the Heat of the Night (19/15.2)		**Law & Order** (R)	

== Wednesday ==
Network		8:00 p.m.	8:30 p.m.	9:00 p.m.	9:30 p.m.	10:00 p.m.	10:30 p.m.
ABC	Fall	The Wonder Years (28/14.2)	Growing Pains (27/14.3)	Doogie Howser, M.D. (21/14.8) (Tied with Who's the Boss?, L.A. Law and the CBS Sunday Movie)	**Married People**	**Cop Rock**	
ABC	Winter	The Wonder Years (28/14.2)	Growing Pains (27/14.3)	Doogie Howser, M.D. (21/14.8) (Tied with Who's the Boss?, L.A. Law and the CBS Sunday Movie)	**Married People**	Equal Justice	
ABC	Mid-winter	The Wonder Years (28/14.2)	Growing Pains (27/14.3)	Doogie Howser, M.D. (21/14.8) (Tied with Who's the Boss?, L.A. Law and the CBS Sunday Movie)	Anything but Love	Equal Justice	
ABC	Spring	The Wonder Years (28/14.2)	Growing Pains (27/14.3)	Doogie Howser, M.D. (21/14.8) (Tied with Who's the Boss?, L.A. Law and the CBS Sunday Movie)	**My Life and Times**	**Gabriel's Fire**	
ABC	Mid-spring	The Wonder Years (28/14.2)	Growing Pains (27/14.3)	Doogie Howser, M.D. (21/14.8) (Tied with Who's the Boss?, L.A. Law and the CBS Sunday Movie)	Anything but Love	American Detective	
ABC	Summer	The Wonder Years (28/14.2)	Growing Pains (27/14.3)	Doogie Howser, M.D. (21/14.8) (Tied with Who's the Boss?, L.A. Law and the CBS Sunday Movie)	**The Man in the Family**	American Detective	
ABC	Mid-summer	The Wonder Years (28/14.2)	Growing Pains (27/14.3)	Doogie Howser, M.D. (21/14.8) (Tied with Who's the Boss?, L.A. Law and the CBS Sunday Movie)	**Davis Rules** (R)	American Detective	
ABC	Late summer	**Dinosaurs** (R)	The Wonder Years (R)	Doogie Howser, M.D. (21/14.8) (Tied with Who's the Boss?, L.A. Law and the CBS Sunday Movie)	**Davis Rules** (R)	Anything but Love (R)	**Married People** (R)
CBS	Fall	**Lenny**	Doctor Doctor	Jake and the Fatman		**WIOU**	
CBS	Mid-fall	48 Hours		Jake and the Fatman		**WIOU**	
CBS	Winter	48 Hours		Jake and the Fatman		**WIOU**	
CBS	Mid-spring	Special programming	Prime Time Pets	Jake and the Fatman		48 Hours	
CBS	Summer	Rescue 911 (R)	**The Family Man**	Jake and the Fatman		48 Hours	
CBS	Mid-summer	The Hogan Family	**The Family Man**	Jake and the Fatman		48 Hours	
CBS	Late summer	Police Squad! (R)	**Morton & Hayes**	Jake and the Fatman		48 Hours	
NBC	Fall	Unsolved Mysteries (14/16.2)		**The Fanelli Boys**	Dear John	Hunter	
NBC	Mid-fall	Unsolved Mysteries (14/16.2)		Dear John	**The Fanelli Boys**	Hunter	
NBC	Late fall	Unsolved Mysteries (14/16.2)		Dear John	**Working It Out**	Hunter	
NBC	Winter	Unsolved Mysteries (14/16.2)		Night Court	Seinfeld	Hunter	
NBC	Spring	Unsolved Mysteries (14/16.2)		Night Court	Dear John	Quantum Leap	
NBC	Summer	Unsolved Mysteries (14/16.2)		Night Court	Dear John	Quantum Leap	
NBC	Mid-summer	Unsolved Mysteries (14/16.2)		Night Court	Seinfeld (R)	Quantum Leap	

Note: Top Cops aired at 10:00 PM on CBS from July to October 1990. Police Squad! on CBS consisted of reruns of the 1982 ABC series.

== Thursday ==
Network		8:00 p.m.	8:30 p.m.	9:00 p.m.	9:30 p.m.	10:00 p.m.	10:30 p.m.
ABC	Fall	Father Dowling Mysteries		**Gabriel's Fire**		Primetime Live	
ABC	Winter	Father Dowling Mysteries		**Gabriel's Fire**		Primetime Live	
ABC	Spring	Father Dowling Mysteries		Twin Peaks		Primetime Live	
ABC	Summer	Father Dowling Mysteries		Twin Peaks		Primetime Live	
CBS	Fall	Top Cops	**The Flash**		Doctor Doctor	Knots Landing	
CBS	Winter	Top Cops	**The Flash**		**Good Sports**	Knots Landing	
CBS	Mid-winter	Top Cops		**The Flash**		Knots Landing	
CBS	Spring	Top Cops		**The Antagonists**		Knots Landing	
CBS	Summer	Top Cops		**Over My Dead Body**		**Broken Badges**	
CBS	Late summer	Top Cops		**The Trials of Rosie O'Neill** (R)		**Golden Years**	
Fox	Fall	The Simpsons	**Babes**	**Beverly Hills, 90210**		Local programming	
Fox	Winter	The Simpsons	**Babes**	**Beverly Hills, 90210**		Local programming	
Fox	Spring	The Simpsons	**Babes**	**Beverly Hills, 90210**		Local programming	
Fox	Summer	The Simpsons	**True Colors** (R)	**Beverly Hills, 90210**		Local programming	
NBC	Fall	The Cosby Show (5/17.4)	A Different World (4/17.9)	Cheers (1/21.6)	Grand (25/14.6)	**Law & Order**	
NBC	Mid-fall	The Cosby Show (5/17.4)	A Different World (4/17.9)	Cheers (1/21.6)	Grand (25/14.6)	L.A. Law (21/14.8) (Tied with Who's the Boss?, Doogie Howser, M.D.and the CBS Sunday Movie)	
NBC	Winter	The Cosby Show (5/17.4)	A Different World (4/17.9)	Cheers (1/21.6)	Wings	L.A. Law (21/14.8) (Tied with Who's the Boss?, Doogie Howser, M.D.and the CBS Sunday Movie)	
NBC	Spring	The Cosby Show (5/17.4)	A Different World (4/17.9)	Cheers (1/21.6)	Seinfeld	L.A. Law (21/14.8) (Tied with Who's the Boss?, Doogie Howser, M.D.and the CBS Sunday Movie)	
NBC	Summer	The Cosby Show (5/17.4)	A Different World (4/17.9)	Cheers (1/21.6)	Seinfeld	L.A. Law (21/14.8) (Tied with Who's the Boss?, Doogie Howser, M.D.and the CBS Sunday Movie)	
NBC	Mid-summer	The Cosby Show (5/17.4)	A Different World (4/17.9)	Cheers (1/21.6)	Wings (R)	L.A. Law (21/14.8) (Tied with Who's the Boss?, Doogie Howser, M.D.and the CBS Sunday Movie)	

On CBS, Sons and Daughters was supposed to premiere on October 25, 1990, while The Flash is supposed to start at 8:00-9:00 p.m., but the show was shelved.

== Friday ==
Network		8:00 p.m.	8:30 p.m.	9:00 p.m.	9:30 p.m.	10:00 p.m.	10:30 p.m.
ABC	Fall	Full House (15/16.0)	Family Matters (16/15.8)	Perfect Strangers	**Going Places**	20/20	
ABC	Winter	Full House (15/16.0)	Family Matters (16/15.8)	Perfect Strangers	**Going Places**	20/20	
ABC	Spring	Full House (15/16.0)	Family Matters (16/15.8)	Perfect Strangers	**Baby Talk** (30/14.0) (Tied with **Davis Rules**)	20/20	
ABC	Mid-spring	Full House (15/16.0)	**Dinosaurs**	Family Matters (16/15.8)	Perfect Strangers	20/20	
ABC	Summer	Full House (15/16.0)	Family Matters (R)	Perfect Strangers (R)	**Going Places** (R)	20/20	
ABC	Mid-summer	Full House (15/16.0)	Family Matters (R)	Perfect Strangers (R)	**Hi Honey, I'm Home!**	20/20	
ABC	Late summer	Family Matters (R)	Growing Pains (R)	Perfect Strangers (R)	**Hi Honey, I'm Home!**	20/20	
CBS	Fall	**Evening Shade**	Bagdad Café	CBS Friday Movie			
CBS	Mid-fall	**Evening Shade**	Bagdad Café	**Over My Dead Body**		Dallas	
CBS	Late fall	**Uncle Buck**	Bagdad Café	**Over My Dead Body**		Dallas	
CBS	Winter	Guns of Paradise		Dallas		**Sons and Daughters**	
CBS	Spring	Guns of Paradise		Dallas		**True Detectives**	
CBS	Early summer	Guns of Paradise		CBS Friday Movie			
CBS	Summer	**Verdict**	**True Detectives**	CBS Friday Movie			
CBS	Mid-summer	**Verdict**	**True Detectives**	**The Flash** (R)		**Sweating Bullets**	
CBS	Late summer	**Fantastic Facts**	Prime Time Pets	CBS Friday Movie			
Fox	Fall	America's Most Wanted		**DEA**		Local programming	
Fox	Mid-fall	America's Most Wanted		**Against the Law**		Local programming	
Fox	Winter	America's Most Wanted		**Against the Law**		Local programming	
Fox	Spring	America's Most Wanted		**DEA**		Local programming	
Fox	Summer	America's Most Wanted		**DEA**		Local programming	
NBC	Fall	Quantum Leap		Night Court	Wings	Midnight Caller	
NBC	Winter	Special programming		**Dark Shadows**		Midnight Caller	
NBC	Spring	Special programming		Hunter		**Dark Shadows**	
NBC	Mid-spring	**The 100 Lives of Black Jack Savage**		Hunter		Midnight Caller	
NBC	Early summer	Special programming		Hunter		Midnight Caller	
NBC	Summer	NBC Friday Night Movie				Midnight Caller	
NBC	Mid-summer	NBC Friday Night Movie				Hunter (R)	
NBC	Late summer	Real Life with Jane Pauley	**Expose**	NBC Friday Night Movie			

== Saturday ==
Network		8:00 p.m.	8:30 p.m.	9:00 p.m.	9:30 p.m.	10:00 p.m.	10:30 p.m.
ABC	Fall	The Young Riders		China Beach		Twin Peaks	
ABC	Winter	The Young Riders		**Under Cover**		Twin Peaks	
ABC	Spring	The Young Riders		The ABC Saturday Night Movie			
ABC	Summer	The Young Riders		The ABC Saturday Night Movie			
CBS	Fall	**The Family Man**	The Hogan Family	**E.A.R.T.H. Force**		48 Hours	
CBS	Late fall	**The Family Man**	The Hogan Family	**Broken Badges**		Wiseguy	
CBS	Early winter	**You Take the Kids**	**Lenny**	CBS Saturday Movie			
CBS	Winter	**Uncle Buck**	**Lenny**	CBS Saturday Movie			
CBS	Spring	**The Flash**		CBS Saturday Movie			
CBS	Summer	CBS Saturday Movie				Doctor Doctor	**Good Sports**
CBS	Mid-summer	CBS Saturday Movie				Special programming	
Fox	Fall	Totally Hidden Video	**Haywire**	COPS	**American Chronicles**	Local programming	
Fox	Winter	Totally Hidden Video	**Haywire**	COPS	COPS (R)	Local programming	
Fox	Mid-winter	Totally Hidden Video	Totally Hidden Video (R)	COPS	COPS (R)	Local programming	
Fox	Spring	Totally Hidden Video	**Yearbook**	COPS	COPS (R)	Local programming	
Fox	Summer	COPS	COPS (R)	Totally Hidden Video	**Babes** (R)	Local programming	
NBC	Fall	**Parenthood**	**Working It Out**	The Golden Girls (12/16.6)	Empty Nest (9/16.7) (Tied with Designing Women and **America's Funniest People**)	Carol & Company	**American Dreamer**
NBC	Winter	Amen	**The Fanelli Boys**	The Golden Girls (12/16.6)	Empty Nest (9/16.7) (Tied with Designing Women and **America's Funniest People**)	Carol & Company	Dear John
NBC	Spring	Amen	Down Home	The Golden Girls (12/16.6)	Empty Nest (9/16.7) (Tied with Designing Women and **America's Funniest People**)	Carol & Company	
NBC	Summer	Amen	**American Dreamer**	The Golden Girls (12/16.6)	Empty Nest (9/16.7) (Tied with Designing Women and **America's Funniest People**)	**Sisters**	
NBC	Mid-summer	Amen	Down Home (R)	The Golden Girls (12/16.6)	Empty Nest (9/16.7) (Tied with Designing Women and **America's Funniest People**)	Dear John (R)	Carol & Company (R)
NBC	Late summer	The Golden Girls (R)	The Golden Girls (R)	Empty Nest (R)	Dear John (R)	**Sisters** (R)	

== By network ==
=== ABC ===
Returning series

- 20/20
- The ABC Monday Night Movie
- The ABC Saturday Night Movie
- The ABC Sunday Night Movie
- America's Funniest Home Videos
- Anything but Love
- China Beach
- Coach
- Doogie Howser, M.D.
- Equal Justice
- Family Matters
- Father Dowling Mysteries
- Full House
- Growing Pains
- Head of the Class
- Life Goes On
- MacGyver
- Monday Night Football
- Perfect Strangers
- Primetime Live
- Roseanne
- Thirtysomething
- Twin Peaks
- Who's the Boss?
- The Wonder Years
- The Young Riders

New series

- **America's Funniest People** *
- **Baby Talk** *
- **Cop Rock**
- **Davis Rules**
- **Dinosaurs** *
- **Eddie Dodd** *
- **Gabriel's Fire**
- **Going Places**
- **Hi Honey, I'm Home!** *
- **The Man in the Family** *
- **Married People**
- **My Life and Times** *
- **Stat** *
- **Under Cover** *

Not returning from 1989–90:

- The ABC Mystery Movie
- Brewster Place
- Capital News
- Chicken Soup
- Elvis
- Free Spirit
- H.E.L.P.
- Homeroom
- Just the Ten of Us
- Living Dolls
- The Marshall Chronicles
- Mission: Impossible
- Mr. Belvedere
- Monopoly
- Sunset Beat
- Super Jeopardy!
- Tim Conway's Funny America

=== CBS ===
Returning series

- 48 Hours
- 60 Minutes
- Bagdad Café
- CBS Sunday Movie
- Dallas
- Designing Women
- Doctor Doctor
- Guns of Paradise (formerly known as Paradise)
- The Hogan Family (moved from NBC)
- Jake and the Fatman
- Knots Landing
- Major Dad
- Murder, She Wrote
- Murphy Brown
- Northern Exposure
- Prime Time Pets
- Rescue 911
- Wiseguy

New series

- **The Antagonists** *
- **Broken Badges** *
- **E.A.R.T.H. Force**
- **Evening Shade**
- **The Family Man**
- **Fantastic Facts** *
- **The Flash**
- **Golden Years**
- **Good Sports** *
- **Lenny**
- **Morton & Hayes** *
- **Over My Dead Body**
- **Sons and Daughters** *
- **Sunday Dinner** *
- **The Trials of Rosie O'Neill**
- **True Detectives** *
- **Uncle Buck**
- **Verdict** *
- **WIOU**
- **You Take the Kids** *

Not returning from 1989–90:

- Beauty and the Beast
- The Bradys
- City
- Falcon Crest
- The Famous Teddy Z
- Grand Slam
- His & Hers
- Island Son
- Max Monroe: Loose Cannon
- Newhart
- Normal Life
- A Peaceable Kingdom
- The People Next Door
- Prime Time Pets
- Room for Romance
- Saturday Night with Connie Chung
- Small Talk
- Snoops
- Sugar and Spice
- Sydney
- Top of the Hill
- Tour of Duty
- Wolf

=== Fox ===
Returning series

- America's Most Wanted
- Comic Strip Live
- Cops
- Fox Night At The Movies
- In Living Color
- Married... with Children
- The Simpsons
- Totally Hidden Video

New series

- **Against the Law**
- **American Chronicles**
- **Babes**
- **Beverly Hills, 90210**
- **DEA**
- **Get a Life**
- **Good Grief**
- **Haywire**
- **Parker Lewis Can't Lose**
- **The Sunday Comics** *
- **Top of the Heap** *
- **True Colors**
- **Yearbook**

Not returning from 1989–90:

- 21 Jump Street (moved to syndication)
- Alien Nation
- Beyond Tomorrow
- Booker
- It's Garry Shandling's Show
- Glory Days
- Molloy
- Open House
- The Outsiders
- The Reporters
- The Tracey Ullman Show

=== NBC ===
Returning series

- Amen
- Cheers
- The Cosby Show
- Dear John
- A Different World
- Down Home
- Empty Nest
- The Golden Girls
- Grand
- Hunter
- In the Heat of the Night
- L.A. Law
- Matlock
- Midnight Caller
- NBC Sunday Night Movie
- NBC Monday Night at the Movies
- Night Court
- Quantum Leap
- Real Life with Jane Pauley
- Seinfeld
- Shannon's Deal
- Unsolved Mysteries
- Wings

New series

- **The 100 Lives of Black Jack Savage** *
- **American Dreamer**
- **Blossom** *
- **Dark Shadows** *
- **Expose** *
- **The Fanelli Boys**
- **Ferris Bueller**
- **The Fresh Prince of Bel-Air**
- **Hull High**
- **Lifestories**
- **Law & Order**
- **Parenthood**
- **Sisters** *
- **Sunday Best** *
- **Working It Out**

Not returning from 1989–90:

- 13 East
- 227
- ALF
- Ann Jillian
- Baywatch (moved to syndication in September 1991)
- Brand New Life
- Carol and Company
- A Family for Joe
- FM
- Hardball
- The Hogan Family (moved to CBS)
- The Magical World of Disney (moved to ABC)
- Mancuso, F.B.I.
- My Two Dads
- Nasty Boys
- The Nutt House
- Singer & Sons
- Sister Kate
- True Blue
- Working Girl

Note: The * indicates that the program was introduced in midseason.
