= List of programs previously broadcast by Fox =

This is a list of television programs once broadcast by the American television network Fox Broadcasting Company (FOX) that have ended their runs on the network.

== Drama ==
- 21 Jump Street (1987–90)
- Werewolf (1987–88)
- Dirty Dozen: The Series (1988)
- Alien Nation (1989–90)
- Booker (1989–90)
- The Outsiders (1990)
- Glory Days (1990)
- DEA (1990)
- Against the Law (1990–91)
- Beverly Hills, 90210 (1990–2000)
- Melrose Place (1992–99)
- The Heights (1992)
- Likely Suspects (1992–93)
- Class of '96 (1993)
- Key West (1993)
- TriBeCa (1993; anthology)
- The Adventures of Brisco County, Jr. (1993–94)
- The X-Files (1993–2002; 2016–2018)
- South Central (1994)
- Models Inc. (1994–95)
- M.A.N.T.I.S. (1994)
- Fortune Hunter (1994)
- New York Undercover (1994–98)
- Party of Five (1994–2000)
- Love and Betrayal: The Mia Farrow Story (1995; miniseries)
- The Great Defender (1995)
- VR.5 (1995)
- Medicine Ball (1995)
- Sliders (1995–97; moved to Syfy)
- Strange Luck (1995–96)
- The Invaders (1995; miniseries)
- Space: Above and Beyond (1995–96)
- Kindred: The Embraced (1996)
- Profit (1996)
- L.A. Firefighters (1996)
- Millennium (1996–99)
- Lawless (1997)
- Pacific Palisades (1997)
- Beyond Belief: Fact or Fiction (1997–2002; anthology)
- Roar (1997)
- Ally McBeal (1997–2002)
- 413 Hope St. (1997–98)
- The Visitor (1997–98)
- Significant Others (1998)
- Brimstone (1998–99)
- Get Real (1999–2000)
- Harsh Realm (1999–2000)
- Ryan Caulfield: Year One (1999)
- Time of Your Life (1999–2000)
- Opposite Sex (2000)
- Dark Angel (2000–02)
- FreakyLinks (2000–01)
- Boston Public (2000–04)
- The Street (2000)
- The Lone Gunmen (2001)
- Night Visions (2001; anthology)
- Pasadena (2001)
- 24 (2001–10; 2014)
- The American Embassy (2002)
- Fastlane (2002–03)
- Firefly (2002)
- John Doe (2002–03)
- Girls Club (2002)
- Keen Eddie (2003–04)
- The O.C. (2003–07)
- Skin (2003)
- Tru Calling (2003–05)
- Wonderfalls (2004)
- The Jury (2004)
- North Shore (2004–05)
- House (2004–12)
- Jonny Zero (2005)
- Point Pleasant (2005)
- The Inside (2005)
- Reunion (2005)
- Prison Break (2005–09; 2017)
- Bones (2005–17)
- Head Cases (2005)
- Killer Instinct (2005)
- Vanished (2006)
- Justice (2006–07)
- Standoff (2006–07)
- The Wedding Bells (2007)
- Drive (2007)
- K-Ville (2007)
- Terminator: The Sarah Connor Chronicles (2008–09)
- New Amsterdam (2008)
- Canterbury's Law (2008)
- Fringe (2008–13)
- Lie to Me (2009–11)
- Dollhouse (2009–10)
- Glee (2009–15)
- Mental (2009)
- Human Target (2010–11)
- Past Life (2010)
- The Good Guys (2010)
- Lone Star (2010)
- The Chicago Code (2011)
- Terra Nova (2011)
- The Finder (2012)
- Alcatraz (2012)
- Touch (2012–13)
- The Mob Doctor (2012–13)
- The Following (2013–15)
- Sleepy Hollow (2013–17)
- Almost Human (2013–14)
- Rake (2014)
- Gang Related (2014)
- Red Band Society (2014–15)
- Gotham (2014–19)
- Gracepoint (2014)
- Empire (2015–20)
- Backstrom (2015)
- Wayward Pines (2015–16)
- Minority Report (2015)
- Scream Queens (2015–16)
- Rosewood (2015–17)
- Second Chance (2016)
- Lucifer (2016–18; moved to Netflix)
- Houdini & Doyle (2016)
- Lethal Weapon (2016–19)
- Pitch (2016)
- The Exorcist (2016–17)
- Star (2016–19)
- 24: Legacy (2017)
- APB (2017)
- Shots Fired (2017; miniseries)
- The Orville (2017–19; moved to Hulu)
- The Gifted (2017–19)
- 9-1-1 (2018–23; moved to ABC)
- The Resident (2018–23)
- The Passage (2019)
- Proven Innocent (2019)
- BH90210 (2019)
- Prodigal Son (2019–21)
- Almost Family (2019–20)
- Deputy (2020)
- 9-1-1: Lone Star (2020–25)
- Filthy Rich (2020)
- Next (2020)
- Fantasy Island (2021–23)
- The Big Leap (2021)
- Our Kind of People (2021–22)
- The Cleaning Lady (2022–25)
- Monarch (2022)
- Alert: Missing Persons Unit (2023–25)
- Accused (2023–24; anthology)
- Rescue: HI-Surf (2024–25)
- The Faithful: Women of the Bible (2026; miniseries)

== Comedy ==
Title	Premiere date	Finale	Seasons	Notes
Married... with Children	April 5, 1987	June 9, 1997	11 seasons, 258 episodes	One additional episode aired on FX
Duet	April 19, 1987	May 7, 1989	3 seasons, 54 episodes	
Down and Out in Beverly Hills	April 26, 1987	September 12, 1987	1 season, 8 episodes	Based on the 1986 film of the same name; five episodes went unaired
Mr. President	May 3, 1987	February 13, 1988	2 seasons, 24 episodes	
Karen's Song	July 18, 1987	September 12, 1987	1 season, 9 episodes	Four episodes went unaired
The New Adventures of Beans Baxter	July 18, 1987	November 28, 1987	1 season, 17 episodes	
Second Chance	September 26, 1987	May 7, 1988	1 season, 21 episodes	Retitled Boys Will Be Boys on January 16, 1988
Women in Prison	October 11, 1987	February 20, 1988	1 season, 13 episodes	
Open House	August 27, 1989	May 6, 1990	1 season, 24 episodes	Spin-off of Duet
Molloy	July 25, 1990	August 15, 1990	1 season, 4 episodes	Three episodes went unaired
Parker Lewis Can't Lose	September 2, 1990	June 13, 1993	3 seasons, 73 episodes	
True Colors	September 2, 1990	April 12, 1992	2 seasons, 44 episodes	
Babes	September 13, 1990	May 9, 1991	1 season, 21 episodes	
Get a Life	September 23, 1990	March 8, 1992	2 seasons, 35 episodes	
Good Grief	September 30, 1990	February 3, 1991	1 season, 13 episodes	
Top of the Heap	April 14, 1991	May 19, 1991	1 season, 6 episodes	Spin-off of Married... with Children
Roc	August 25, 1991	May 10, 1994	3 seasons, 71 episodes	One additional episode aired on BET
Herman's Head	September 8, 1991	April 21, 1994	3 seasons, 72 episodes	
Drexell's Class	September 19, 1991	March 5, 1992	1 season, 18 episodes	
Charlie Hoover	November 9, 1991	December 29, 1991	1 season, 7 episodes	
Stand by Your Man	April 5, 1992	May 17, 1992	1 season, 7 episodes	Based on Birds of a Feather
Vinnie & Bobby	May 30, 1992	July 11, 1992	1 season, 7 episodes	Spin-off of Top of the Heap
Down the Shore	June 21, 1992	May 27, 1993	2 seasons, 29 episodes	
Bill & Ted's Excellent Adventures	June 28, 1992	August 9, 1992	1 season, 7 episodes	Based on Bill & Ted's Excellent Adventure
Rachel Gunn, R.N.	June 28, 1992	September 4, 1992	1 season, 10 episodes	Three episodes went unaired
Martin	August 27, 1992	May 1, 1997	5 seasons, 122 episodes	
Flying Blind	September 13, 1992	May 2, 1993	1 season, 22 episodes	
Woops!	September 27, 1992	December 6, 1992	1 season, 10 episodes	Three episodes went unaired
Great Scott!	October 4, 1992	November 29, 1992	1 season, 6 episodes	Seven episodes went unaired
Shaky Ground	December 13, 1992	May 23, 1993	1 season, 17 episodes	
Danger Theatre	July 11, 1993	August 22, 1993	1 season, 12 episodes	
Living Single	August 22, 1993	January 1, 1998	5 seasons, 118 episodes	
Daddy Dearest	September 5, 1993	December 5, 1993	1 season, 10 episodes	One episode went unaired
Bakersfield P.D.	September 14, 1993	August 18, 1994	1 season, 17 episodes	
The Sinbad Show	September 16, 1993	April 21, 1994	1 season, 24 episodes	
Monty	January 11, 1994	February 15, 1994	1 season, 6 episodes	Seven episodes went unaired
The George Carlin Show	January 16, 1994	July 16, 1995	2 seasons, 27 episodes	
Hardball	September 4, 1994	October 23, 1994	1 season, 9 episodes	
Wild Oats	September 4, 1994	September 25, 1994	1 season, 4 episodes	Two episodes went unaired
Get Smart	January 8, 1995	February 19, 1995	1 season, 7 episodes	Sequel to the 1965 series
My Wildest Dreams	May 28, 1995	June 25, 1995	1 season, 5 episodes	
The Crew	August 31, 1995	June 30, 1996	1 season, 21 episodes	
The Preston Episodes	September 9, 1995	October 28, 1995	1 season, 8 episodes	Two episodes went unaired
Ned and Stacey	September 11, 1995	January 27, 1997	2 seasons, 35 episodes	
Partners	September 11, 1995	April 1, 1996	1 season, 22 episodes	
Misery Loves Company	October 1, 1995	October 22, 1995	1 season, 4 episodes	Four episodes went unaired
Too Something	October 1, 1995	June 23, 1996	1 season, 9 episodes	Retitled New York Daze on May 26, 1996; thirteen episodes went unaired
Local Heroes	March 17, 1996	April 14, 1996	1 season, 7 episodes	
The Last Frontier	June 3, 1996	July 8, 1996	1 season, 6 episodes	Two episodes went unaired
Lush Life	September 9, 1996	September 30, 1996	1 season, 4 episodes	Three episodes went unaired
Party Girl	September 9, 1996	September 30, 1996	1 season, 6 episodes	Based on the 1995 film of the same name
Love and Marriage	September 28, 1996	October 5, 1996	1 season, 3 episodes	Six episodes went unaired
Pauly	March 3, 1997	April 7, 1997	1 season, 5 episodes	Two episodes went unaired
Between Brothers	September 11, 1997	January 29, 1998	1 season, 13 episodes	Season 1 only Moved to UPN for season 2
Ask Harriet	January 4, 1998	January 29, 1998	1 season, 5 episodes	Eight episodes went unaired
Damon	March 22, 1998	July 20, 1998	1 season, 13 episodes	
Getting Personal	April 6, 1998	October 16, 1998	2 seasons, 16 episodes	One episode went unaired
Holding the Baby	August 23, 1998	December 15, 1998	1 season, 7 episodes	Based on the British series of the same name; seven episodes went unaired
That '70s Show	August 23, 1998	May 18, 2006	8 seasons, 200 episodes	
Living in Captivity	September 11, 1998	October 16, 1998	1 season, 6 episodes	One episode went unaired
Costello	September 15, 1998	October 13, 1998	1 season, 4 episodes	Four episodes went unaired
Action	September 16, 1999	December 2, 1999	1 season, 8 episodes	Five episodes went unaired
Ally	September 28, 1999	December 28, 1999	1 season, 14 episodes	Half-hour version of Ally McBeal
Malcolm in the Middle	January 9, 2000	May 14, 2006	7 seasons, 151 episodes	
Titus	March 20, 2000	August 12, 2002	3 seasons, 54 episodes	
Normal, Ohio	November 1, 2000	December 13, 2000	1 season, 7 episodes	Five episodes went unaired
Grounded for Life	January 10, 2001	December 3, 2002	3 seasons, 40 episodes	Seasons 1–3A only Moved to The WB for seasons 3B–5
Undeclared	September 25, 2001	March 12, 2002	1 season, 17 episodes	
The Tick	November 8, 2001	January 24, 2002	1 season, 9 episodes	
The Bernie Mac Show	November 14, 2001	April 14, 2006	5 seasons, 104 episodes	
That '80s Show	January 23, 2002	May 29, 2002	1 season, 13 episodes	
Andy Richter Controls the Universe	March 19, 2002	January 12, 2003	2 seasons, 14 episodes	Five episodes went unaired
Greg the Bunny	March 27, 2002	August 11, 2002	1 season, 11 episodes	Two additional episodes aired on IFC
Oliver Beene	March 9, 2003	August 29, 2004	2 seasons, 22 episodes	Two episodes went unaired
Wanda at Large	March 26, 2003	November 7, 2003	2 seasons, 14 episodes	Five episodes went unaired
The Pitts	March 30, 2003	April 20, 2003	1 season, 5 episodes	Two episodes went unaired
Luis	September 19, 2003	October 17, 2003	1 season, 4 episodes	Six episodes went unaired
A Minute with Stan Hooper	October 29, 2003	December 12, 2003	1 season, 8 episodes	Five episodes went unaired
Arrested Development	November 2, 2003	February 10, 2006	3 seasons, 53 episodes	Revived by Netflix for seasons 4–5
Cracking Up	March 9, 2004	April 5, 2004	1 season, 6 episodes	Six episodes went unaired
Method & Red	June 16, 2004	September 15, 2004	1 season, 9 episodes	Four episodes went unaired
Quintuplets	June 16, 2004	January 12, 2005	1 season, 22 episodes	
Life on a Stick	March 24, 2005	April 27, 2005	1 season, 5 episodes	Eight episodes went unaired
Stacked	April 13, 2005	January 11, 2006	2 seasons, 14 episodes	Five episodes went unaired
The War at Home	September 11, 2005	April 22, 2007	2 seasons, 44 episodes	
Kitchen Confidential	September 19, 2005	December 5, 2005	1 season, 4 episodes	Nine episodes went unaired
Free Ride	March 1, 2006	April 9, 2006	1 season, 6 episodes	
The Loop	March 15, 2006	July 1, 2007	2 seasons, 17 episodes	
'Til Death	September 7, 2006	June 20, 2010	4 seasons, 79 episodes	
Happy Hour	September 7, 2006	November 2, 2006	1 season, 4 episodes	Nine episodes went unaired
The Winner	March 4, 2007	March 18, 2007	1 season, 6 episodes	
Back to You	September 19, 2007	May 14, 2008	1 season, 14 episodes	Three episodes went unaired
Unhitched	March 2, 2008	March 30, 2008	1 season, 6 episodes	
The Return of Jezebel James	March 14, 2008	March 21, 2008	1 season, 3 episodes	Four episodes went unaired
Do Not Disturb	September 10, 2008	September 24, 2008	1 season, 3 episodes	Four episodes went unaired
Brothers	September 25, 2009	December 27, 2009	1 season, 13 episodes	
Sons of Tucson	March 14, 2010	August 1, 2010	1 season, 13 episodes	
Raising Hope	September 21, 2010	April 4, 2014	4 seasons, 88 episodes	
Running Wilde	September 21, 2010	December 26, 2010	1 season, 9 episodes	Four additional episodes aired on FX
Traffic Light	February 8, 2011	March 31, 2011	1 season, 12 episodes	Based on Ramzor
Breaking In	April 6, 2011	April 3, 2012	2 seasons, 12 episodes	
New Girl	September 20, 2011	May 15, 2018	7 seasons, 146 episodes	
I Hate My Teenage Daughter	November 30, 2011	March 20, 2012	1 season, 7 episodes	
Ben and Kate	September 25, 2012	January 22, 2013	1 season, 13 episodes	
The Mindy Project	September 25, 2012	March 24, 2015	3 seasons, 67 episodes	Seasons 1–3 only Moved to Hulu for seasons 4–6
The Goodwin Games	May 20, 2013	July 1, 2013	1 season, 7 episodes	
Brooklyn Nine-Nine	September 17, 2013	May 20, 2018	5 seasons, 112 episodes	Seasons 1–5 only Moved to NBC for seasons 6–8
Dads	September 17, 2013	February 11, 2014	1 season, 18 episodes	One additional episode was only released on demand
Enlisted	January 10, 2014	June 22, 2014	1 season, 13 episodes	
Surviving Jack	March 27, 2014	May 8, 2014	1 season, 7 episodes	
Mulaney	October 5, 2014	February 15, 2015	1 season, 13 episodes	
The Last Man on Earth	March 1, 2015	May 6, 2018	4 seasons, 67 episodes	
Weird Loners	March 31, 2015	May 5, 2015	1 season, 6 episodes	
Grandfathered	September 29, 2015	May 10, 2016	1 season, 22 episodes	
The Grinder	September 29, 2015	May 10, 2016	1 season, 22 episodes	
Cooper Barrett's Guide to Surviving Life	January 3, 2016	June 26, 2026	1 season, 13 episodes	
Son of Zorn	September 25, 2016	February 19, 2017	1 season, 13 episodes	Live-action/animation hybrid
The Mick	January 1, 2017	April 3, 2018	2 seasons, 37 episodes	
Making History	March 5, 2017	May 21, 2017	1 season, 9 episodes	
Ghosted	October 1, 2017	July 22, 2018	1 season, 16 episodes	
LA to Vegas	January 2, 2018	May 1, 2018	1 season, 15 episodes	
Rel	September 9, 2018	January 13, 2019	1 season, 12 episodes	
The Cool Kids	September 28, 2018	May 10, 2019	1 season, 22 episodes	
Last Man Standing	September 28, 2018	May 20, 2021	3 seasons, 64 episodes	Seasons 7–9 only Seasons 1–6 aired on ABC
The Moodys	December 4, 2019	June 20, 2021	2 seasons, 14 episodes	Based on A Moody Christmas
Outmatched	January 23, 2020	March 26, 2020	1 season, 10 episodes	
Call Me Kat	January 3, 2021	May 4, 2023	3 seasons, 53 episodes	Based on Miranda
Pivoting	January 9, 2022	March 10, 2022	1 season, 10 episodes	
Welcome to Flatch	March 17, 2022	February 2, 2023	2 seasons, 27 episodes	Based on This Country
Going Dutch	January 2, 2025	April 23, 2026	2 seasons, 22 episodes	

== Animation ==
Title	Premiere date	Finale	Seasons	Notes
The Critic	March 5, 1995	May 21, 1995	1 season, 10 episodes	Season 2 only Season 1 aired on ABC
King of the Hill	January 12, 1997	September 13, 2009	13 seasons, 255 episodes	Seasons 1–13 only Four episodes produced for season 13 aired in first-run syndication Revived by Hulu for season 14–present
The PJs	January 10, 1999	September 5, 2000	2 seasons, 31 episodes	Seasons 1–2 only Moved to The WB for season 3
Futurama	March 28, 1999	August 10, 2003	4 seasons, 72 episodes	Seasons 1–4 only Revived by Comedy Central for seasons 5–7; Revived by Hulu for season 8–present
Sit Down, Shut Up	April 19, 2009	November 21, 2009	1 season, 13 episodes	First four episodes aired in primetime; the remaining nine episodes aired late at night
The Cleveland Show	September 27, 2009	May 19, 2013	4 seasons, 88 episodes	Spin-off of Family Guy
Allen Gregory	October 30, 2011	December 18, 2011	1 season, 7 episodes	
Napoleon Dynamite	January 15, 2012	March 4, 2012	1 season, 6 episodes	Based on the 2004 film of the same name
Axe Cop	July 21, 2013	November 30, 2013	1 season, 12 episodes	Season 1 only Moved to FXX for season 2
High School USA!	July 21, 2013	November 30, 2013	1 season, 11 episodes	One additional episode aired on FXX
Golan the Insatiable	November 23, 2013	July 19, 2015	2 seasons, 11 episodes	First season aired late at night; second season aired in primetime
Lucas Bros. Moving Co.	November 23, 2013	March 1, 2014	1 season, 6 episodes	Season 1A only Moved to FXX for seasons 1B–2
Bordertown	January 3, 2016	May 22, 2016	1 season, 13 episodes	
Bless the Harts	September 29, 2019	June 20, 2021	2 seasons, 34 episodes	
Duncanville	February 16, 2020	June 26, 2022	3 seasons, 33 episodes	Six episodes produced for the third season were released on Hulu
The Great North	January 3, 2021	September 14, 2025	5 seasons, 97 episodes	
HouseBroken	May 31, 2021	August 6, 2023	2 seasons, 30 episodes	

== Unscripted ==
=== Docuseries ===
- American Chronicles (1990)
- Yearbook (1991)
- Sightings (1992–93)
- Encounters: The Hidden Truth (1994–96)
- Fox Files (1998)
- American High (2000)
- Cosmos: A Spacetime Odyssey (2014)
- Phenoms (2018)
- Cosmos: Possible Worlds (2020; moved from National Geographic)

=== Game shows ===
- Family Double Dare (1988)
- Big Deal (1996)
- Guinness World Records Primetime (1998–2001)
- Greed (1999–2000)
- It's Your Chance of a Lifetime (2000)
- The Chamber (2002)
- The Rich List (2006)
- My GamesFever (2006–07)
- Are You Smarter than a 5th Grader? (2007–09; 2015)
- The Moment of Truth (2008)
- Hole in the Wall (2008–09)
- Million Dollar Money Drop (2010–11)
- Take Me Out (2012)
- Riot (2014)
- Bullseye (2015)
- Boom! (2015)
- Love Connection (2017–18)
- Mental Samurai (2019–21)
- Spin the Wheel (2019)
- I Can See Your Voice (2020–24)
- Game of Talents (2021)
- Cherries Wild (2021)
- Snake Oil (2023)
- We Are Family (2024)

=== Reality ===
- The Reporters (1988–90)
- Beyond Tomorrow (1988–90)
- Cops (1989–2013; moved to Spike TV/Paramount Network, later moved to Fox Nation)
- Totally Hidden Video (1989–92)
- Best of the Worst (1991–92)
- What's So Funny? (1995)
- The World's Funniest! (1997)
- World's Wildest Police Videos (1998–2002)
- Temptation Island (2001–03)
- Boot Camp (2001)
- Murder in Small Town X (2001)
- Love Cruise (2001)
- American Idol (2002–16; moved to ABC)
- Invasion of the Hidden Cameras (2002)
- 30 Seconds to Fame (2002–03)
- Anything for Love (2003)
- Joe Millionaire (2003; 2022)
- Married by America (2003)
- Mr. Personality (2003)
- American Juniors (2003)
- Paradise Hotel (2003; 2019)
- Totally Outrageous Behavior (2003–04)
- The Simple Life (2003–05)
- Renovate My Family (2004–05)
- The Next Great Champ (2004)
- World's Craziest Videos (2004)
- My Big Fat Obnoxious Fiance (2004)
- The Littlest Groom (2004)
- Forever Eden (2004)
- The Swan (2004)
- Playing It Straight (2004)
- The Casino (2004)
- Trading Spouses (2004–07)
- The Complex: Malibu (2004)
- Nanny 911 (2004–07)
- My Big Fat Obnoxious Boss (2004)
- The Rebel Billionaire: Branson's Quest for the Best (2004)
- Who's Your Daddy? (2005)
- The Princes of Malibu (2005)
- So You Think You Can Dance (2005–24)
- Skating with Celebrities (2006)
- Unan1mous (2006)
- Celebrity Duets (2006)
- On the Lot (2007)
- Anchorwoman (2007)
- Nashville (2007)
- The Next Great American Band (2007)
- More to Love (2009)
- Mobbed (2011–13)
- Buried Treasure (2011)
- The X Factor (2011–13)
- Q'Viva! The Chosen (2012)
- The Choice (2012)
- Hotel Hell (2012–16)
- Does Someone Have to Go? (2013)
- MasterChef Junior (2013–24)
- I Wanna Marry "Harry" (2014)
- Utopia (2014)
- World's Funniest (2015)
- Knock Knock Live (2015)
- Home Free (2015–16)
- Superhuman (2016–17)
- American Grit (2016–17)
- Coupled (2016)
- Showtime at the Apollo (2016–17 as a series of specials; 2018 as a regular series)
- My Kitchen Rules (2017)
- Kicking & Screaming (2017)
- You the Jury (2017)
- The F Word (2017)
- The Four: Battle for Stardom (2018)
- Gordon Ramsay's 24 Hours to Hell and Back (2018–20)
- First Responders Live (2019)
- What Just Happened??! with Fred Savage (2019)
- Flirty Dancing (2019–20)
- The Masked Singer: After the Mask (2020)
- Celebrity Watch Party (2020)
- Ultimate Tag (2020)
- Labor of Love (2020)
- The Masked Dancer (2020–21)
- Holmes Family Effect (2021)
- Alter Ego (2021)
- The Real Dirty Dancing (2022)
- Domino Masters (2022)
- Lego Masters: Celebrity Holiday Bricktacular (2022–24)
- Gordon Ramsay's Food Stars (2023–24)
- Stars on Mars (2023)
- America's Most Wanted: Missing Persons (2025)
- The Snake (2025)

=== Variety ===
- The Late Show (1986–87; 1988)
- The Tracey Ullman Show (1987–90)
- The Wilton North Report (1987–88)
- Comic Strip Live (1989–94)
- In Living Color (1990–94)
- Haywire (1990–91)
- The Sunday Comics (1991)
- The Edge (1992–93)
- The Ben Stiller Show (1992–93)
- The Chevy Chase Show (1993)
- Townsend Television (1993)
- House of Buggin' (1995)
- MADtv (1995–2009)
- Saturday Night Special (1996)
- OOPS! The World's Funniest Outtakes (1996-1997)
- Meet the Marks (2002)
- Cedric the Entertainer Presents (2002–03)
- Stupid Behavior Caught on Tape (2003)
- Banzai! (2003–04)
- Kelsey Grammer Presents: The Sketch Show (2005)
- Talkshow with Spike Feresten (2006–09)
- Osbournes Reloaded (2009)
- The Wanda Sykes Show (2009–10)
- In the Flow with Affion Crockett (2011)
- Party Over Here (2016)
- Let's Be Real (2021)

== News programming ==
- Front Page (1993)
- Fox After Breakfast (1996)
- The Pulse (2002–03)
- The Huckabee Show (2010)

== Sports programming ==
- NHL on Fox (1995–99)
- Boxing on Fox (1995-2022)
- Barclays Premier League (1999–2013)
- Cotton Bowl Classic (1999–2014)
- Celebrity Boxing (2002)
- Man vs. Beast (2003–04)
- Formula One (2007–12)
- UFC on Fox (2011–18)
- Thursday Night Football (2018–21)
- PBA on Fox (2018–25)
- XFL (2020)
- FIFA World Cup on Fox After Hours with James Corden (2026)

== Pro wrestling ==
- WWE Saturday Night's Main Event (1992)
- WWE SmackDown (2019–24; moved to USA Network)
- WWE Tribute to the Troops (2020–23)

== Specials ==
- Springfield's Most Wanted (1995)
- Alien Nation: Millennium (1996)
- Breaking the Magician's Code (1997–1998)
- Nick Fury: Agent of S.H.I.E.L.D. (1998)
- Teen Choice Awards (1999–2019)
- The Night of the Headless Horseman (1999)
- Olive, the Other Reindeer (1999)
- Sexiest Bachelor in America Pageant (2000)
- Surprise Wedding (2000)
- Who Wants to Marry a Multi-Millionaire? (2000)
- Surprise Wedding 2 (2001)
- Baywatch: Hawaiian Wedding (2003)
- Celebrity Spelling Bee (2004)
- Fox News Specials (2004–08)
- Laugh It Up, Fuzzball: The Family Guy Trilogy (2007–10)
- 24: Redemption (2008)
- The Simpsons 20th Anniversary Special – In 3-D! On Ice! (2010)
- Night of the Hurricane (2011)
- Ice Age: A Mammoth Christmas (2011)
- Miss Universe (2015–19; 2021)
- Miss USA (2016–19)
- Ice Age: The Great Egg-Scapade (2016)

== Children's programming ==
- Action Man (2000–02)
- The Adrenaline Project (2007–08)
- The Adventures of Dynamo Duck (1992–94)
- The Adventures of Sam & Max: Freelance Police (1997–98)
- A.J.'s Time Travelers (1994)
- Alien Racers (2005)
- Alienators: Evolution Continues (2001–02)
- Alvin and the Chipmunks (1992–93; reruns only)
- Angela Anaconda (2000)
- Animaniacs (1993–95; moved to Kids' WB)
- Attack of the Killer Tomatoes (1990–92)
- The Avengers: United They Stand (1999–2000)
- Back to the Future (2003)
- Batman: The Animated Series (1992–95)
- Beast Machines: Transformers (1999–2000)
- Beast Wars: Transformers (1999–2000)
- Beetleborgs Metallix (1997–98)
- Beetlejuice (1991)
- Big Bad Beetleborgs (1996–97)
- Big Guy and Rusty the Boy Robot (1999–2001)
- Bill & Ted's Excellent Adventures (1990–91)
- Bobby's World (1990–98)
- Bratz (2005–07)
- Budgie the Little Helicopter (1995–96)
- C Bear and Jamal (1996–97)
- Chaotic (2006–08)
- The Cramp Twins (2003–06)
- Cubix: Robots for Everyone (2003–04)
- Cybersix (1999)
- Cyberchase (2002–08)
- Defenders of Dynatron City (1992)
- Di-Gata Defenders (2007–08)
- Digimon Adventure (1999–2000)
- Digimon Adventure 02 (2000–01)
- Digimon Tamers (2001–02)
- Dinosaur King (2007–08)
- Dinozaurs (2000)
- Dog City (1992–95)
- Donkey Kong Country (1998–99)
- Droopy, Master Detective (1993–94)
- Dungeons & Dragons (2000)
- Eek! The Cat (1992–97)
- Eerie, Indiana (1997)
- Eerie, Indiana: The Other Dimension (1998–99)
- Escaflowne (2000)
- F-Zero: GP Legend (2004–05)
- Fighting Foodons (2002–03)
- Flint the Time Detective (2000–01)
- Fun House (1990–91)
- Funky Cops (2003–08)
- Galidor: Defenders of the Outer Dimension (2002)
- George of the Jungle (1992)
- Ghostwriter (1992)
- G.I. Joe: Sigma 6 (2005–06)
- Godzilla: The Series (1998–2000)
- Goosebumps (1995–98)
- The Incredible Crash Dummies (1993)
- Jim Henson's Animal Show (1994–96)
- Johnson and Friends (1994–96)
- Kirby: Right Back at Ya! (2002–06)
- Kong: The Animated Series (2001)
- Life with Louie (1995–98)
- Little Shop (1991–92)
- Little Dracula (1991)
- Los Luchadores (2001–02)
- Mad Jack the Pirate (1998–99)
- Magic Adventures of Mumfie (1995–96)
- The Magic School Bus (1998–2002)
- Magical DoReMi (2005–06)
- The Magician (1999)
- Masked Rider (1995–96; moved to first-run syndication)
- Medabots (2001–02)
- Merrie Melodies Starring Bugs Bunny and Friends (1991–94)
- Mew Mew Power (2005–06)
- Mighty Morphin Alien Rangers (1996; miniseries)
- Mighty Morphin Power Rangers (1993–95)
- Mighty Mouse: The New Adventures (1992)
- Mon Colle Knights (2001–02)
- Moolah Beach (2001)
- Monster Rancher (1999–2002)
- Mowgli: The New Adventures of the Jungle Book (1998)
- The Mr. Potato Head Show (1998–99)
- Muppet Babies (1991–92; reruns only)
- Mystic Knights of Tir Na Nog (1998–99)
- NASCAR Racers (1999–2001)
- Ned's Newt (1998–99)
- The New Woody Woodpecker Show (1999–2002)
- Ninja Turtles: The Next Mutation (1997–98)
- Oggy and the Cockroaches (1998–99)
- One Piece (2004–06)
- Peter Pan and the Pirates (1990–91)
- Piggsburg Pigs! (1990–91)
- Pirate Islands (2004)
- The Plucky Duck Show (1992–93)
- Power Rangers in Space (1998)
- Power Rangers Lightspeed Rescue (2000)
- Power Rangers Lost Galaxy (1999)
- Power Rangers Time Force (2001)
- Power Rangers Turbo (1997)
- Power Rangers Wild Force (2002; moved to ABC Kids)
- Power Rangers Zeo (1996)
- Red Planet (1994)
- The Ripping Friends (2001–02)
- Roswell Conspiracies: Aliens, Myths and Legends (2001)
- Round the Twist (1997)
- The Secret Files of the Spy Dogs (1998–99)
- Shaman King (2003–05)
- Sherlock Holmes in the 22nd Century (1999–2000)
- Silver Surfer (1998)
- Solarman (1992–93)
- Sonic X (2003–06)
- Space Goofs (1997–99)
- Spider-Man (1994–98)
- Spider-Man Unlimited (1999–2001)
- The Spooktacular New Adventures of Casper (1996–98)
- Stargate Infinity (2002–03)
- Stickin' Around (1997–98)
- Super Dave: Daredevil for Hire (1992–93)
- Swamp Thing (1991–92)
- Taz-Mania (1991–95)
- Teenage Mutant Ninja Turtles (2003–07; moved to The CW)
- The Tick (1994–96)
- Thunderbirds (1994)
- Tiny Toon Adventures (1992–95)
- Tom & Jerry Kids (1990–93)
- Toonsylvania (1998–99)
- Transformers: Robots in Disguise (2001–02)
- Ultraman Tiga (2002–03)
- Ultimate Muscle (2002–04)
- Viva Piñata (2006–08)
- Where on Earth Is Carmen Sandiego? (1994–98)
- Winx Club (2004–08)
- WMAC Masters (2003)
- X-Men (1992–97)
- Xuxa (1993)
- Xyber 9: New Dawn (1999)
- Young Hercules (1998-99)
- Yu-Gi-Oh! (2006–07)
- Yu-Gi-Oh! GX (2007–08)
- Zazoo U (1990–91)
