= Philip Burton =

Philip or Phil Burton may refer to:

- Phil Burton (born 1974), Australian musician
- Philip Burton (musician), violist of the Griller Quartet
- Phillip Burton (1926–1983), U.S. politician
- Philip Burton (politician) (1910–1995), Irish politician, farmer, and auctioneer
- Philip Burton (theatre director) (1904–1995), founder of the American Musical and Dramatic Academy
- Philip Burton Jr. (1934–2010), American documentary filmmaker
- Philip Lionel Burton (1914–1996), British civil servant
