= Yearbook (disambiguation) =

A yearbook is an annual commemorative book published by an institution, often a school or university.

Yearbook may also refer to:

== Books ==
- Year Books, law reports from England from the 13th through 16th centuries
- Year Book Medical Publishers, an American medical publishing firm that merged with C. V. Mosby into Mosby–Year Book
- Museums and Galleries Yearbook, a catalog of UK museums and galleries
- Yearbook.com, also known as MyYearbook, a social networking service currently owned by Quepasa Corporation

== Film and TV ==
- Yearbook (TV series), a TV documentary film made by the FOX Network
- "The Yearbook" (1991) Season 4 Episode 19 of The Wonder Years

== Music ==
- The Yearbook (album), album by rapper KJ-52
- "Yearbook", a song on the Hanson album Middle of Nowhere
