= Sydney Walsh =

American actress (born 1961)

- Born: June 6, 1961 (age 65); Manhattan, New York, U.S.
- Education: Williams College (BA)
- Occupation: Actress
- Years active: 1985–present

Sydney Walsh (born on June 6, 1961) is an American actress. She starred in the television series Hooperman.

== Early life and education ==
Sydney Walsh was born in New York City in 1961. She earned a Bachelor of Arts degree in English and theatre from Williams College.

== Career ==
Walsh appeared in the controversial television film An Early Frost, about Michael Pierson (Aidan Quinn) a young, gay lawyer dying of AIDS. It was broadcast on NBC on November 11, 1985, and co-starred Gena Rowlands, Ben Gazzara, and Sylvia Sidney. She has also made guest appearances on numerous television series including The Twilight Zone; T. J. Hooker; Hunter; Who's the Boss?; Equal Justice; The Young Riders; Murder, She Wrote; Lois & Clark: The New Adventures of Superman; Teamo Supremo; Beyond Belief: Fact or Fiction and The Practice.

In 1990, Walsh appeared in the short-lived ABC police drama Sunset Beat. She was also a series regular on the sitcom Daddy Dearest and appeared on Melrose Place and The Young and the Restless. Her film credits include American Gun, Auggie Rose, Point Break, Three Men and a Little Lady and A Nightmare on Elm Street 2: Freddy's Revenge.

Walsh has taught acting at The Acting Corps located in North Hollywood, Los Angeles.

== Filmography ==
=== Film ===
Year	Title	Role	Notes
1985	A Nightmare on Elm Street 2: Freddy's Revenge	Kerry Hellman	
1987	P.I. Private Investigations	Janet	
1988	To Die For	Kate Wooten	
1989	Vietnam War Story: The Last Days	Libby	
1990	Three Men and a Little Lady	Laurie	
1991	Point Break	Miss Deer	
1998	No More Baths	Alice McPhie	
1999	Paper Bullets	Cheryl	
2000	Auggie Rose	Suzanne	
2001	MacArthur Park	Newscaster	
2001	The Want	Sarah	
2005	American Gun	Karen	
2010	Never Sleep Again: The Elm Street Legacy	Herself	Documentary
2021	Reparenting	Grandma	Short

=== Television ===
Year	Title	Role	Notes
1985	The Twilight Zone	Melody	Episode: "Children's Zoo"
1985	An Early Frost	Susan Maracek	Television film
1986	T. J. Hooker	Marlene Sterns	Episode: "The Obsession"
1986	Hunter	Gloria Raymark	Episode: "The Setup"
1986	Mr. Sunshine	Carol	Episode: "Fear of Falling"
1986	Adam's Apple	Toni Adams	Television film
1986	Who's the Boss?	Tanya Stromball	Episode: "Semi-Private Lives"
1986–1995	Murder, She Wrote	Kay Garrett / Tiffany Beckman	2 episodes
1987	Desperado	Sally	Television film
1987–1989	Hooperman	Officer Mo DeMott	42 episodes
1989	Trenchcoat in Paradise	Mona Williams	Television film
1990	Midnight Caller	Amanda Bernstein	Episode: "Based on a True Story"
1990	Equal Justice	Peggy / Lynn Purcel	2 episodes
1990–1994	Dream On	Susan Tupper	2 episodes
1991	Eddie Dodd	Kitty Greer	6 episodes
1992	The Boys of Twilight	Tina Spender	Episode: "A Bend in the River"
1992	Mann & Machine	Teresa Wynans	Episode: "Water, Water, Everywhere"
1992	The Young Riders	Rosemary Burke	3 episodes
1992	The Danger of Love: The Carolyn Warmus Story	Nikki	Television film
1992	Homewrecker	Jane Whitson	Television film
1992–1994	Melrose Place	Kay Beacon	5 episodes
1993	Good Advice	Claire	Episode: "Jack of Hearts"
1993	Moon Over Miami	Kate Hammond	Episode: "Small Packages"
1993	Daddy Dearest	Christine Winters	13 episodes
1994	Viper	Elizabeth Huston	Episode: "Pilot"
1994	M.A.N.T.I.S.	Sonya Storm	Episode: "Gloves Off"
1994	Sweet Justice	Eve Bartlett	Episode: "Sex, Lies and Shining Armor"
1994	A Kiss Goodnight	Marcia Aronson	Television film
1995	Platypus Man	Dr. Nancy Meeker	Episode: "Both Sides Now"
1995	The Marshal	Kianja	Episode: "Snow Orchid"
1996	Race Against Time: The Search for Sarah	Sandy	Television film
1996	Nowhere Man	Laura	Episode: "Through a Lens Darkly"
1996	The Sentinel	Peggy Anderson	Episode: "Reunion"
1996	The Tomorrow Man	Joyce Henderson	Television film
1996	Lois & Clark: The New Adventures of Superman	Carol Stanford	Episode: "Bob and Carol and Lois and Clark"
1996	O. Henry's Christmas	Diana	Television film
1997	A Walton Easter	Aurora Jeffreys	Television film
1997	Silk Stalkings	Mrs. Dexter	Episode: "Ladies Man"
1997–1998	Beyond Belief: Fact or Fiction	Brenda / Jane Doe	2 episodes
1998	Pensacola: Wings of Gold	Lynne Egan	Episode: "Great Expectations"
1998	Life of the Party: The Pamela Harriman Story	Minnie Churchill	Television film
1998	V.I.P.	Chloe Nolan	Episode: "Vallery of the Dolls"
1999	The Practice	Miss Kramer	Episode: "Judge and Jury"
1999	Touched by an Angel	Ellen	Episode: "Family Business"
1999	Snoops	Lisa Shyer	Episode: "Pilot"
1999	Get Real	Julia LaSalle	2 episodes
1999	Hefner: Unauthorized	Christie Hefner	Television film
2000	ER	Mrs. Lomax	Episode: "The Fastest Year"
2000	Family Law	Donna Bowmer	Episode: "The Choice"
2000	Nash Bridges	Heidi	2 episodes
2002	Philly	Lauren Graves	Episode: "Meat Me in Philly"
2002	First Monday	Dr. Cheryl Padgett	Episode: "Dangerous Words"
2002	NYPD Blue	Carrie McDermott	Episode: "Half-Ashed"
2002	Teamo Supremo	Mrs. Woolingantz / Madame Snake (voice)	4 episodes
2002	Teacher's Pet	Mrs. Sproutwell (voice)	Episode: "Double Dog Dare"
2003	Nip/Tuck	Alexi Lange	Episode: "Cliff Mantegna"
2004	Line of Fire	Mary Kinney	Episode: "Mother & Child Reunion"
2004	Crossing Jordan	Judith Madison	Episode: "Second Chances"
2005	CSI: NY	Laural Stanwyk	Episode: "The Dove Commission"
2005	Clubhouse	Dina Martel	Episode: "Between First and Home"
2005	Without a Trace	Virginia	Episode: "From the Ashes"
2006	Medium	Medical Examiner	Episode: "Method to His Madness"
2010	Castle	Patty DeLuca	Episode: "The Late Shaft"
2010	The Young and the Restless	Judge Delores Anderson	5 episodes
2014	Major Crimes	Susan Mills	Episode: "Return to Sender: Part 2"
2016	The Cheerleader Murders	Liz	Television film
2016	Luckboxes	Joan Reynolds	Episode: "Pilot"
2021	General Hospital	Maggie	5 episodes
