= Trenchcoat in Paradise =

- Genre: Crime; Mystery
- Written by: Tom Dempsey
- Directed by: Martha Coolidge
- Starring: Dirk Benedict; Sydney Walsh; Bruce Dern
- Music by: John Debney
- Country of origin: United States
- Original language: English

Production
- Executive producers: Josh Kane; Michael Ogiens
- Producer: Harvey Frand
- Production location: Honolulu
- Cinematography: John Jensen
- Editor: Jack Harnish
- Running time: 100 minutes
- Production companies: Finnegan/Pinchuk Productions; MGM Television

Original release
- Network: CBS
- Release: October 18, 1989

Trenchcoat in Paradise is a 1989 American made-for-television mystery-crime film directed by Martha Coolidge, and starring Dirk Benedict, Sydney Walsh, Catherine Oxenberg, Michelle Phillips and Bruce Dern.

== Plot ==
Eddie Mazda (Dirk Benedict) is a hard-nosed private investigator originally from Jersey City, New Jersey. After working a job for a widow named Nan Thompson (Amy Yasbeck), he soon after is confronted by mob boss Dom Gellatti (Ralph Drischell), the man who killed Mrs. Thompson's husband. Having already ransacked Mazda's film studio for any incriminating pictures against him for fear of federal prosecutions, Gellatti gives Eddie the chance to back down by forcing him to leave Jersey City and never come back, or else. After gathering some of his possessions, leaving a phone message to his ex-wife Vicky, and leaving his pet goldfish with the next-door neighbor and her cat, Mazda is escorted by two of Gellatti's goons to the airport and given a plane ticket to Chicago and some money; instead, he decides to go to Hawaii, taking with him film negatives that he managed to hide from the mobsters.

== Cast ==
- Dirk Benedict as Eddie Mazda
- Sydney Walsh as Mona Williams
- Catherine Oxenberg as Lisa Duncan
- Michelle Phillips as Suzanna Hollander
- Jeremy Slate as Robert Graham
- Kim Zimmer as Claire Hollander
- Bruce Dern as John Hollander
- Vincent Guastaferro as Carmen Nunzo Jr.
- Keone Young as Bob Kanuka
- Amy Yasbeck as Nan Thompson
- Montana Joe The Cat as Neighbor's Cat

== See also ==
- List of American films of 1989
