= Philip Lionel Burton =

Philip Lionel Burton CBE
- Born: 2 April 1914; Elstree, England
- Died: 14 June 1996 (aged 82)
- Education: Bedford Modern School

Philip Lionel Burton CBE (2 April 1914 – 14 June 1996) was Head of the Civil Service Pay Research Unit between 1963 and 1971. He was appointed CBE in 1972 and was subsequently an adviser to Governments at home and overseas on pay related issues.

== Life ==
Philip Lionel Burton was born at Elstree on 2 April 1914 and educated at Bedford Modern School. At the end of his schooldays his father was taken ill and Burton was forced to abandon hopes of going to University. Instead Burton joined the civil service, initially working at the GPO.

In 1935, Burton was assigned to the War Office, the first person to be recruited since the end of the Great War. He was not allowed to join the army at the outbreak of World War II, so he moved to Talbot House with Tubby Clayton to do Fire Watch Duty in the City.

In time Burton's section of the War Office was evacuated and he became a Lieutenant of the War Office Home Guard platoon until finally joining the army in 1941. Despite being offered an immediate commission, he initially decided to join the ranks where he saw service in Egypt. He was promoted to 2nd Lieutenant in 1943 and was demobilised with the rank of lieutenant-colonel.

After the war, Burton continued his career with the War Office in West Africa, Northern Command and the Suez Canal Zone before joining the Civil Service Pay Research Unit as Commanding Officer in 1957. He was back at the War Office between 1960 and 1963 before returning to the Civil Service Pay Research Unit as Director. At this point ‘he made civil service history by being the first non-graduate to be up-graded from the Executive side to the Administrative side’, a promotion that had to be approved by the then Prime Minister, Harold Macmillan. In 1971 he took early retirement was subsequently an adviser to Governments at home and overseas on pay related issues.

Burton was appointed CBE in 1972 although not even his best friends knew of the honour until they attended his funeral. Burton died on 14 June 1996.
