= Museums & Galleries Yearbook =

The Museums & Galleries Yearbook (aka Museums Yearbook) is produced annually by the Museums Association in the United Kingdom. It is the largest catalogue of museums and galleries available in the UK and includes over 3,000 entries. Each entry covers staff names, their job details, collections information, web/email addresses, and telephone/fax numbers.

The Yearbook also provides contact details for national, regional, and international cultural organizations.

== Editions ==
The Yearbook appears annually, for example:

- Museums & Galleries Yearbook 2008. ISBN 978-0-902102-92-7.
- Museums & Galleries Yearbook 2009. ISBN 978-0-902102-95-8.
