= American Dreamer (TV series) =

American sitcom

- Genre: Sitcom
- Created by: Susan Seeger
- Starring: Robert Urich; Chay Lentin; Johnny Galecki; Jeffrey Tambor; Carol Kane
- Composer: Peter Leinheiser
- Country of origin: United States
- Original language: English
- No. of seasons: 1
- No. of episodes: 17

Production
- Executive producer: Gary David Goldberg
- Producer: Linda Nieber
- Running time: 30 minutes
- Production companies: Ubu Productions; Paramount Television

Original release
- Network: NBC
- Release: September 20, 1990 – June 22, 1991

American Dreamer is an American sitcom television series created by Susan Seeger, which aired on NBC from September 20, 1990, until June 22, 1991, as part of its 1990-91 lineup.

American Dreamer stars Robert Urich as fictional character Tom Nash, formerly a high-powered network correspondent who was forced to reassess his priorities following the death of his wife. He decided to give up his career in order to spend more time with his children. To do this, he moved to Kenosha, Wisconsin, where he supported his family by contributing a column about "real people" to a Chicago newspaper. His editor, Joe Baines (Jeffrey Tambor), felt Tom was completely wasting his talents and drove out from Chicago weekly (a huge sacrifice, from his viewpoint) to attempt to convince Tom to return to the world of "hard news". Other characters included Tom's zany secretary, Lillian Abernathy (Carol Kane), and a friendly waitress at Tom's favorite local diner, Holly Baker (Margaret Welsh).

Tom sometimes "broke the fourth wall" to address the viewers directly about his thoughts regarding the situations he encountered.

== Cast ==
- Robert Urich as Tom Nash
- Margaret Welsh as Holly Baker
- Jeffrey Tambor as Joe Baines
- Carol Kane as Lillian Abernathy
- Chay Lentin as Rachel Nash
- Johnny Galecki as Danny Nash

== Episodes ==
No.	Title	Directed by	Written by	Original release date
1	"Pilot"	Sam Weisman	Susan Seeger	September 20, 1990
2	"Guys Just Wanna Have Fun"	Sam Weisman	Gary David Goldberg	September 22, 1990
3	"Flight of the Dodo"	Sam Weisman	Brad Hall	September 29, 1990
4	"All God's Children Go to Wisconsin"	Sam Weisman	Bruce Helford	October 6, 1990
5	"Corvette Man"	Sam Weisman	Theresa Rebeck	October 13, 1990
6	"Over the Hill?"	Sam Weisman	Brad Hall	October 20, 1990
7	"Mr. Wizard"	Sam Weisman	David Owen	October 27, 1990
8	"Divorce, American Dreamer Style"	Sam Weisman	Susan Seeger & Brad Hall	November 3, 1990
9	"In from the Cold: Part 1"	Sam Weisman	Seth Freeman	November 10, 1990
10	"In from the Cold: Part 2"	Sam Weisman	Seth Freeman	November 24, 1990
11	"The Fabulous Baker Girls"	Sam Weisman	Theresa Rebeck	December 1, 1990
12	"A Face in the Cloud"	Sam Weisman	Gordon Farr	December 8, 1990
13	"Don't Drink the Water"	Sam Weisman	Theresa Rebeck	May 25, 1991
14	"Mother Knows Best"	Sam Weisman	Brad Hall & Theresa Rebeck	June 1, 1991
15	"Papa Joe"	Sam Weisman	Seth Freeman	June 8, 1991
16	"Heartbreak Diner"	Sam Weisman	Susan Seeger	June 15, 1991
17	"They Shoot Ducks, Don't They?"	Sam Weisman	Brad Hall	June 22, 1991
