= C. Everett Koop, M.D. =

- Genre: Documentary
- Presented by: C. Everett Koop
- Country of origin: United States
- Original language: English
- No. of seasons: 1
- No. of episodes: 5

Production
- Executive producer: Philip Burton Jr.
- Producer: MacNeil/Lehrer Productions
- Running time: 45 minutes

Original release
- Network: NBC
- Release: June 4 – June 30, 1991

C. Everett Koop, M.D. is a five-part American documentary television series hosted by C. Everett Koop. The series premiered June 4, 1991, on NBC.

== Production ==
The series was conceived as a look at the latest technology in medicine, however Koop changed the focus to emphasize the failures within the American health care system. Each episode was shot using a different production crew. The series took five months to film.

== Episodes ==
No.	Title	Original release date
1	"Children at Risk"	June 4, 1991
2	"Listening to Teenagers"	June 9, 1991
3	"Forever Young"	June 16, 1991
4	"Hard Choices"	June 23, 1991
5	"A Time for Change"	June 30, 1991

== Reception ==
Ken Tucker of Entertainment Weekly rated the series a B, calling it "pretty interesting". Tucker continued by saying that "the scripts are just a tad banal", but that Koop's "intelligence and sincerity come through in his deft, informed interviewing style". Ray Richmond of the Orange County Register stated that the series is "forthright and intelligent" despite Koop's penchant for being "a tad overbearing with his scholarly demeanor and bullying manner".
