= Philip Burton Jr. =

- Born: December 9, 1934; New York, New York
- Died: December 24, 2010 (aged 76); Santa Barbara, California
- Occupation: Documentary filmmaker
- Spouses: Martha Simcoe (m. 1962; div. 1974) Cindy Pitou (m. 1985)

Philip Burton Jr. (December 9, 1934 – December 24, 2010) was a documentary filmmaker whose subjects included African-Americans and American government. Among his works were C. Everett Koop, M.D..
