= DEA (1990 TV series) =

- Genre: Drama
- Created by: Richard Di Lello
- Written by: Michael Ahnemann; Richard Di Lello
- Directed by: Rob Bowman; Colin Bucksey
- Starring: Christopher Stanley
- Country of origin: United States
- Original language: English
- No. of seasons: 1
- No. of episodes: 13

Production
- Executive producer: Richard Di Lello
- Producers: Michael Ahnemann; Gordon Freeman; Cyrus Nowrasteh; Peter McCabe
- Running time: 60 minutes
- Production company: Lorimar Television

Original release
- Network: Fox
- Release: September 7, 1990 – May 24, 1991

D.E.A. is an American drama series which was aired on Fox as part of its 1990–91 lineup.

D.E.A. was based on true stories of the Drug Enforcement Administration. Shot in cinéma vérité style, the program combined recreated scenes using actors with actual surveillance footage and film of actual newscasts covering the stories depicted.

== Cast ==
- Jenna Gago as Teresa Robles
- Tom Mason as Bill Stadler
- Miguel Sandoval as Rafael Cordera
- Alan Scarfe as Schliemann
- Byron Keith Minns as Jimmy Sanders
- Christopher Stanley as Nick Biaggi
- David Wohl as Phil Jacobs

== Production ==
The original concept of the show came from showrunner/creator Richard DiLello, who claimed that he'll create a hybrid format for the show that will combine elements of documentary (including newsreel footage and interviews) with drama.

The project was soon pitched to Lorimar Television, which was in turn pitched to the fast-growing Fox Broadcasting Company.

On May 14, 1990, the Fox Broadcasting Company announced that they would pick up the series for the new Friday night schedule, alongside reality program America's Most Wanted, which was shown at 8:00-9:00pm.

Fox apparently had considerable confidence in this concept. When the initial version garnered low ratings and was put on hiatus, before its return the program was retooled into DEA—Special Task Force, which placed more emphasis on the agents' personal lives and showed less graphic violence. The revamped show premiered in April 1991, but also failed to achieve significant ratings and the program was canceled for good in June 1991.

== Episodes ==
No.	Title	Directed by	Written by	Original release date
1	"DEA (Pilot)"	Peter Werner	Richard Di Lello	September 7, 1990
2	"Aftermath"	Colin Bucksey	Richard Di Lello	September 14, 1990
3	"Under Presidential Seal"	David Jackson	Michael Ahnemann	September 21, 1990
4	"Jumping the Trampoline"	Colin Bucksey	Ann Powell & Rose Schacht	September 28, 1990
5	"Prime Mover"	Mark Sobel	David Peckinpah	October 5, 1990
6	"Bloodsport"	Unknown	Cyrus Nowrasteh	October 12, 1990
7	"MethLab"	Peter Ellis	Peter McCabe	October 26, 1990
8	"Moving Mary Jane"	David Jackson	Michael Ahnemann	November 2, 1990
9	"The Fat Lady Sings Alone"	Unknown	Michael Ahnemann	April 19, 1991
10	"Dance with the Devil"	Peter Ellis	Peter McCabe	April 26, 1991
11	"The Connection"	Unknown	Cyrus Nowrasteh	May 3, 1991
12	"White Lies"	Rob Bowman	David E. Peckinpah	May 10, 1991
13	"Zero Sum Game"	Unknown	Garner Simmons	May 24, 1991

== Reception ==
The show received mostly positive reviews by critics. The San Francisco Examiner called the show "the biggest breakthrough of the new season."

== See also ==
- 1990 in television
