= Under Cover (1991 TV series) =

- Genre: Spy thriller
- Created by: William Broyles, Jr.
- Written by: William Broyles, Jr. Scott Kaufer; Thania St. John; Frank Snepp
- Starring: Anthony Denison; Linda Purl; John Rhys-Davies; John Slattery; Kasi Lemmons; Josef Sommer; Arlene Taylor; Raye Birk; Adam Ryan; Marnette Patterson
- Theme music composer: Cameron Allen
- Composer: Bill Conti
- Country of origin: United States
- Original language: English
- No. of seasons: 1
- No. of episodes: 13 (4 unaired)

Production
- Executive producers: William Broyles, Jr. John Sacret Young
- Producers: Terry Morse, Jr.
- Production locations: Los Angeles, California, United States; Dubrovnik, Croatia
- Cinematography: Roy H. Wagner; Thomas Alger Olgeirson; Randall Robinson
- Editors: John A. Barton; Donald R. Rode; David A. Simmons
- Running time: 45 minutes
- Production companies: Sacret; Warner Bros. Television

Original release
- Network: ABC
- Release: January 7 – July 20, 1991

Under Cover is an American secret agent drama series that premiered on ABC on January 7, 1991. The series starred Anthony John Denison and Linda Purl as Dylan and Kate Del'Amico, a husband and wife who share the same day job—as spies for a fictional U.S. intelligence agency.

Under Cover follows the couple's adventures as they attempt to balance the demands of a sometimes deadly profession while raising two children. The series co-starred John Rhys-Davies as Flynn, the team's gadget man (analogous to James Bond's Q) who is also a deadly assassin.

Although well received by critics and launched with a high-rated made-for-TV movie, Under Cover was adversely affected by the outbreak of the 1991 Persian Gulf War. A two-part episode had been produced involving the Del'Amicos infiltrating Iraq in the wake of its invasion of Kuwait, and culminated with an American military strike on the country. The night the second episode was scheduled to air, real-life hostilities erupted. The series aired in subsequent weeks but was cancelled after just over a month on the air.

== Characters ==
- Dylan Del'Amico (Anthony Denison)
- Kate Del'Amico (Linda Purl)
- Flynn (John Rhys-Davies)
- Graham Parker (John Slattery)
- Alex Robbins (Kasi Lemmons)
- Stewart Merriman (Josef Sommer)
- Megan (Arlene Taylor)
- Grimbach (Raye Birk)
- Marlon Del'Amico (Adam Ryan)
- Emily Del'Amico (Marnette Patterson)
- Director Waugh (G. W. Bailey)
- Dr. Lee (Michael Paul Chan)
- Col. Kalganin (Paul Freeman)
- Bing Tupper (Randolph Mantooth)

== Episodes ==
No.	Title	Directed by	Original release date	Prod. code
1	"The Company"	Harry Winer	January 7, 1991	14981
Note: Two-hour pilot.
2	"Sacrifices (part 1)" "Before the Storm (part 1)"	Michael Fresco	January 12, 1991	187083
3	"Truth & Consequences"	Paul Krasny	January 26, 1991	187089
4	"War Game"	Jonathan Sanger	February 2, 1991	187084
5	"Family Album"	Vern Gillum	February 9, 1991	187082
6	"Mr. Butterfly"	Jonathan Sanger	February 16, 1991	187088
7	"Sacrifices (part 2)" "Before the Storm (part 2)"	Michael Fresco	July 13, 1991	187085
8	"Close to Home" "Spy Games (part 1)"	Christopher Leitch	July 20, 1991	187081
9	"The Wall" "Spy Games (part 2)"	Michael Fresco	July 20, 1991	187092
10	"Eeney, Meaney, Miney, Mole"	Richard Compton	Unaired	187086
11	"Minotaur"	Paul Krasny	Unaired	187087
12	"Our Man in Huallaga"	Jonathan Sanger	Unaired	187090
13	"Quarantine"	Michael Katleman	Unaired	187091
