= The Antagonists (TV series) =

1991 American legal drama TV series

- Genre: Legal drama
- Created by: Daniel Pyne
- Starring: David Andrews; Lauren Holly
- Composer: Michael Convertino
- Country of origin: United States
- Original language: English
- No. of seasons: 1
- No. of episodes: 9 (list of episodes)

Production
- Executive producers: Daniel Pyne; William Sackheim
- Running time: 60 minutes
- Production company: Universal Television

Original release
- Network: CBS
- Release: March 26 – May 30, 1991

The Antagonists is an American legal drama television series that aired on CBS from March 26 until May 30, 1991.

== Premise ==
Two Los Angeles lawyers clash inside and outside of the courtroom. Hal Erickson, in his book, Encyclopedia of Television Law Shows: Factual and Fictional Series About Judges, Lawyers and the Courtroom, 1948-2008, commented: "The hour-long CBS drama series The Antagonists was a potpourri of timeworn legal-show cliches ..."

== Cast ==
- David Andrews as Jack Scarlett
- Lauren Holly as Kate Ward
- Lisa Jane Persky as Joanie Rutledge
- Brent Jennings as ADA Marvin Thompson
- Matt Roth as Clark Munsinger

== Episodes ==
No.	Title	Directed by	Written by	Original release date
1	"Pilot"	Rob Cohen	Harold Rosenthal	March 26, 1991
Belinda Bauer plays a woman arrested for drunken driving who Jack defends when police discover evidence to implicate her in a murder. 90-minute pilot episode.
2	"Silent Beef"	Unknown	Daniel Pyne	March 28, 1991
Jack Scarlett's client is a former drug dealer who murdered a man in a crowded restaurant who say it was self-defense, however Kate Ward believes otherwise and prosecutes.
3	"Full Disclosure"	Unknown	Unknown	April 4, 1991
unavailable
4	"Con Safos"	Unknown	Unknown	April 11, 1991
Jack Scarlett is appointed legal advisor to a man defending himself when charged for his sister's murder. Bruce Beatty and Caroline Kava guest star.
5	"Variations on a Theme"	Charles Haid	Carolyn Shelby and Christopher Ames	April 18, 1991
Kate pursues a smooth con artist (Rene Auberjonois) who may have committed a murder.
6	"Lawyers, Guns and Money"	Deborah Reinisch	Daniel Pyne	April 25, 1991
Scarlett's former mentor is arrested on drug charges.
7	"Unnatural Acts"	Unknown	Jeff Cazanov	May 2, 1991
The lover of a Latin American activist is killed in a car bombing and Kate Ward suspects it is politically motivated; however evidence leads in another direction. Endre Hules and Rosanna DeSoto guest star.
8	"State of Mind"	Unknown	Unknown	May 23, 1991
Maryann Plunkett plays a distraught woman who shoots and kills her husband and his mistress and Jack makes an emotional case for manslaughter while Kate argues for murder.
9	"Brother to Brother"	Chip Chalmers	Unknown	May 30, 1991
Jack Scarlett urges Kate Ward to assist him in unraveling a family plot in which one brother confesses to a murder for which his sibling is serving time. Philip Baker Hall guest stars.
