= American Chronicles =

Television series

- American Chronicles title card
- Genre: Documentary
- Created by: Mark Frost
- Narrated by: Richard Dreyfuss
- Composer: Billy Barber
- Country of origin: United States
- Original language: English
- No. of seasons: 1
- No. of episodes: 13 (1 unaired)

Production
- Executive producer: Mark Frost
- Running time: 30 min.
- Production company: Lynch/Frost Productions

Original release
- Network: Fox
- Release: September 8 – December 15, 1990

American Chronicles was a documentary television program broadcast by Fox Broadcasting Company as part of its 1990 fall lineup.

American Chronicles was produced by Mark Frost through Lynch/Frost Productions, the company that he founded with David Lynch. Featured many of the same quirky camera angles, unusual music, and a focus on violence and sexuality that were hallmarks of their ABC series Twin Peaks. The half-hour weekly program was narrated by Richard Dreyfuss.

This program had a relatively brief run, being cancelled just over three months after its premiere, after ranking last out of 98 shows with an average household rating of 3.07.

== Episodes ==
1. "Farewell to the Flesh" (pilot episode; writer/director: Mark Frost; airdate: 9/8/1990)
2. "The Eye of the Beholder" (airdate: 9/15/1990)
3. "Manhattan After Dark" (writer/producer: Robin L. Sestero; airdate: 9/22/1990)
4. "Auto-Obsession" (airdate: 9/29/1990)
5. "Biker Nation" (writer/producer: Ruben Norte; airdate: 10/6/1990)
6. "Semper Fidelis" (writer/producer: Robin L. Sestero; airdate: 10/13/1990)
7. "This Gun's for Hire / Defender of the Faith" (writer/producer: Chappy Hardy; airdate: 10/27/1990)
8. "After a Fashion / An American Camelot" (airdate: 11/3/1990)
9. "Here Today, Gone Tomorrow / Truck Stop" (writer/producer: Robin L. Sestero; airdate: 10/6/1990)
10. "Once Upon a Time" (about Hugh Hefner) (writers: Gary H. Grossman, Michael Gross, Robert Heath; directed by Robert Heath; airdate: 11/17/1990)
11. "The Class of '65" (airdate: 12/8/1990)
12. "Diamonds Are Forever (Last Day at Comiskey Park) / The Future That Never Was" (writer/producer: David H. Jones; airdate: 12/15/1990)
13. "Champions" (unaired in U.S.; first aired in UK 6/21/92)

== International broadcasts ==
American Chronicles was aired in the United Kingdom by Channel 4 (1992), in Australia by SBS (1993), in New Zealand by TV3 (1992), in France by Planète (1992) and in Spain by TVE (1992).
