= Eddie Dodd =

- Genre: Drama
- Created by: Lawrence Lasker; Walter Parkes; Wesley Strick
- Starring: Treat Williams; Annabelle Gurwitch; Corey Parker; Sydney Walsh
- Composer: Dennis McCarthy
- Country of origin: United States
- Original language: English
- No. of seasons: 1
- No. of episodes: 6

Production
- Executive producers: Clyde Phillips; Lawrence Lasker; Walter Parkes
- Running time: 42 minutes
- Production companies: Lasker/Parkes Productions; Clyde Phillips Productions; Columbia Pictures Television

Original release
- Network: ABC
- Release: March 12 – June 5, 1991

Eddie Dodd is an American drama television series created by Lawrence Lasker, Walter Parkes and Wesley Strick. It is based on the 1989 film True Believer. The series stars Treat Williams, Annabelle Gurwitch, Corey Parker and Sydney Walsh. The series aired on ABC from March 12, 1991, to June 5, 1991.

== Cast ==
- Treat Williams as Eddie Dodd
- Annabelle Gurwitch as Billie
- Corey Parker as Roger Barron
- Sydney Walsh as Kitty Greer

== Episodes ==
No.	Title	Directed by	Written by	Original release date
1	"Love and Death"	Rob Cohen & Ron Lagomarsino	Michael S. Chernuchin	March 12, 1991
2	"Solomon's Choice"	Unknown	Unknown	March 19, 1991
3	"Pound of Flesh"	Unknown	Unknown	March 26, 1991
4	"Unnecessary Losses"	Unknown	Unknown	April 2, 1991
5	"Welcome Home"	Unknown	Unknown	May 29, 1991
6	"Excuses, Excuses"	Unknown	Unknown	June 5, 1991
