= Against the Law (TV series) =

- Genre: Dramedy
- Created by: Michael Butler; David Manson
- Starring: Michael O'Keefe; Suzzanne Douglas; Elizabeth Ruscio; M. C. Gainey
- Theme music composer: Thomas Newman
- Composer: Jay Gruska
- Country of origin: United States
- Original language: English
- No. of seasons: 1
- No. of episodes: 17

Production
- Cinematography: Misha Suslov
- Running time: 60 minutes
- Production companies: Sarabande Productions; Daniel H. Blatt Productions; MGM/UA Television

Original release
- Network: Fox
- Release: September 23, 1990 – April 5, 1991

Against the Law is an American legal comedy-drama television series that aired on the Fox network from September 23, 1990, until April 5, 1991 (followed by an April 12 rerun of the February 1 episode). Starring Michael O'Keefe and Suzzanne Douglas, the series centered on the brash Boston lawyer Simon MacHeath, who left his job at a prestigious law firm to start his own defense practice.

Seventeen one-hour episodes were broadcast from September 23, 1990, to April 5, 1991.

== Cast ==
- Michael O'Keefe as Simon MacHeath
- Suzzanne Douglas as Yvette Carruthers
- Elizabeth Ruscio as Elizabeth Verhagen
- Rosalind Chao as Toy Feng
- M. C. Gainey as J.T. "Miggsy" Meigs
- Fritz Weaver as Skipper Haverhill
- Barbara Williams as Phoebe
- Lance Norris as the SWAT Team Leader

== Episodes ==
No.	Title	Directed by	Written by	Original release date
1	"Pilot"	Jan Egleson	Michael Butler	September 23, 1990
2	"Where Truth Lies"	Eugene Corr	Frederick Rappaport	September 30, 1990
3	"The Price of Life"	Francis Delia	Howard Chesley	October 7, 1990
4	"The Women"	Jan Egleson	Fern Hill	October 14, 1990
5	"The Second Man"	Fred Gerber	Story by : Cynthia Saunders; Teleplay by : Michael Butler	October 28, 1990
6	"Requiem in B Flat"	Jan Egleson	Sandy Kroopf	November 4, 1990
7	"Contempt"	Jan Egleson	Michael Butler	November 16, 1990
8	"A Safe, New World"	Sam Pillsbury	Sam Denver & Elia J. Katz	November 23, 1990
9	"Nature Now"	Don Scardino	Wayne Powers and Donna Dottley Powers	December 7, 1990
10	"We the Jury"	Sam Pillsbury	William Bentley & Steven Whitney	December 21, 1990
11	"The Indictment"	Peter Ellis	Elia Katz	January 11, 1991
12	"Hoops"	Rob Bowman	Barry Beckerman & Michelle Gallagher	February 1, 1991
13	"The Union Label"	Peter Ellis	William Bentley & Steven Whitney	February 8, 1991
14	"Damages"	Armand Mastroianni	William Bentley & Steven Whitney	February 15, 1991
15	"Past, Present"	Jan Egleson	Yale Udoff & Maurice Jules	March 1, 1991
16	"Miss Mass"	Victor Lobl	Story by : Michael A. Graham & E. Gail Willhardt; Teleplay by : Michael A. Graham	March 8, 1991
17	"Evil Conduct"	Armand Mastroianni	Yale Udoff	April 5, 1991
