= The Sunday Comics =

- Genre: Comedy

Production
- Running time: 60 mins.
- Production companies: Dakota North Entertainment; 20th Century Fox Television

Original release
- Network: Fox
- Release: April 28 – December 22, 1991

The Sunday Comics is a prime time showcase of comedy broadcast in the United States by Fox Broadcasting Company in 1991 and 1992.

The Sunday Comics showcased not only standup comedy but also variety acts, and film shorts produced by comics including Bruce Baum, Gilbert Gottfried, Rich Hall, and Rick Overton. The program's primary venue was the Palace Theatre in Hollywood, but the show also made visits to other locations.

The program was originally hosted by Jeff Altman, but he left the show in June 1991 and was replaced by Lenny Clarke. Clark's tenure as host ended in October, and for the rest of the year (until the show's December cancellation), guest hosts were used.

Edited reruns of the show were shown on Fox in February and March 1992.
