= Good Grief (TV series) =

- Genre: Sitcom
- Created by: Stu Silver
- Written by: Stu Silver; Ron Burla; Donald Todd; Mark Masuoka
- Directed by: Howard Storm; Jerry Lewis; Stu Silver
- Starring: Joel Brooks; Sheldon Feldner; Howie Mandel; Tom Poston; Wendy Schaal
- Composer: Steve Nelson
- Country of origin: United States
- Original language: English
- No. of seasons: 1
- No. of episodes: 13

Production
- Executive producers: David Steinberg; Larry Brezner; Jonathan D. Krane; Stu Silver
- Producers: Ron Burla; Mark Masuoka; Marsha Posner Williams
- Production location: Northridge, Los Angeles
- Running time: 30 min.
- Production companies: Triggerfish Productions; Morra, Brezner & Steinberg Entertainment; 20th Century Fox Television

Original release
- Network: Fox
- Release: September 30, 1990 – February 3, 1991

Good Grief is an American sitcom that aired for 13 episodes on Fox from September 30, 1990, to February 3, 1991.

== Premise ==
Good Grief focuses on a funeral home called "The Sincerity Mortuary" in Dacron, Ohio run by strait-laced Warren Pepper (Joel Brooks), his sister Debbie (Wendy Schaal), and her flamboyant husband Ernie Lapidus (Howie Mandel), who was determined to "put the 'fun' back in 'funeral'." Tom Poston and Sheldon Feldner played assistants Ringo Prowley and Raoul, respectively.

== Cast ==
- Howie Mandel as Ernie Lapidus
- Wendy Schaal as Debbie Lapidus
- Joel Brooks as Warren Pepper
- Sheldon Feldner as Raoul
- Tom Poston as Ringo Prowley

== Episodes ==
No.	Title	Directed by	Written by	Original release date
1	"Ladies and Gentlemen... Ernie Lapidus!"	Howard Storm	Stu Silver	September 30, 1990
2	"Full Dress Burial"	Howard Storm	Donald Todd	October 7, 1990
3	"Bury Me a Little"	Howard Storm	Ron Burla	October 14, 1990
4	"Warren Learns to Fly"	Howard Storm	Stu Silver	October 21, 1990
5	"Mooses, Masons and the Secret Life of Trees"	Howard Storm	Stu Silver	October 28, 1990
6	"Cub Scouts and Horses & Whiskers on Kittens"	Howard Storm	Stu Silver	November 4, 1990
7	"The Good, the Bad and the Mariachis"	Howard Storm	Ron Burla	November 11, 1990
8	"Viva Las Dacron"	Howard Storm	Stu Silver	November 18, 1990
9	"Ringo Gets a Job"	Howard Storm	Donald Todd	December 2, 1990
10	"Birth of a Notion"	Howard Storm	Mark Masuoka	December 16, 1990
11	"The Bear"	Jerry Lewis	Stu Silver	January 6, 1991
12	"The Big Bang Theory"	Stu Silver	Ron Burla	January 13, 1991
13	"13th Episode Anniversary Special"	Howard Storm	Donald Todd	February 3, 1991

== Production ==
According to the show's creator Stu Silver, the project had been turned down by every network and cable channel in 1983.
