= Yearbook (TV series) =

American television series

- Genre: Reality Television
- Directed by: Hank O'Karma
- Narrated by: Ken Dashow
- Country of origin: United States
- Original language: English
- No. of seasons: 1
- No. of episodes: 9

Production
- Production locations: Glen Ellyn, Illinois, United States
- Running time: 30 minutes

Original release
- Network: Fox
- Release: 7 March – 4 May 1991

Yearbook was a documentary television series that aired on the Fox Network in 1991. It is one of the earliest examples of a reality series as it chronicled the school and home lives of various students of Glenbard West High School in Glen Ellyn, Illinois, a suburb about 30 miles outside Chicago. The critically acclaimed series was filmed over a six-month period, five days a week by Chicago videographer Ned Miller in the Betacam video format. Inspired to make a "real life" version of John Hughes films, co-executives Lou Gorfain and Chuck Bangert shot a ratio of "150:1", 150 minutes to one minute of usable footage, comparing waiting and observing to capture unscripted moments to "panning for gold".

New Screen Concepts, Inc., a Connecticut-based independent film company chose Glenbard West after considering 100 high schools across the nation to represent a "typical American high school". They began filming in October 1990 with the permission of the administrators, pupils, parents, and school board. The series premiered on prime time, back-to-back with the popular American teen drama series original, Beverly Hills, 90210, to ride a surge in second-season viewership; and aired regularly Saturdays 8:30 pm EST / 7:30 pm CST.

Among the subjects covered include homecoming, teen pregnancy, sports competition, dating, the Gulf War, and personal tragedy.

The premise of the show was repeated in another Fox reality series, American High, which was filmed in 2000 at another suburban Chicago school, Highland Park High School in Highland Park, Illinois.
