= The Golden Girls season 1 =

The Golden Girls
- Season 1
- DVD cover
- No. of episodes: 25

Release
- Original network: NBC
- Original release: September 14, 1985 – May 10, 1986

Season chronology
- Next → Season 2

The first season of the American television comedy series The Golden Girls originally aired on NBC in the United States between September 14, 1985, and May 10, 1986. Created by television writer Susan Harris, the series was produced by Witt/Thomas/Harris Productions and ABC Studios (Touchstone Television.) It starred Bea Arthur, Rue McClanahan, Betty White, and Estelle Getty as the main characters Dorothy Zbornak, Blanche Devereaux, Rose Nylund, and Sophia Petrillo. The series revolves around the lives of four older women living together in a house in Miami.

The first season of The Golden Girls premiered to strong ratings for NBC, ranking number one in its first week on air and number seven among all primetime programs airing during the 1985–86 primetime network season. Upon its initial airing, the show was met with critical acclaim and was the recipient of various industry awards, including three Emmy Awards and two Golden Globe awards. Buena Vista Home Entertainment (now Walt Disney Studios Home Entertainment) released the first season on DVD in the United States on November 24, 2004, and in Canada on April 10, 2007.

== Episodes ==
No. overall	No. in season	Title	Directed by	Written by	Original release date	Prod. code	Rating/share (households)
1	1	"The Engagement"	Jay Sandrich	Susan Harris	September 14, 1985	001	25.0/43
Widows Blanche Hollingsworth – an art museum administrator, Rose Nylund – a grief counselor, and divorcee Dorothy Zbornak – a substitute teacher, share a house in Miami with gay housekeeper Coco. Blanche gets engaged to Harry, the man she has been dating, surprising Dorothy and raising Rose's suspicions. The ceremony is however called off at the last minute after Harry is caught by the police for bigamy. Dorothy's mother, widow Sophia Petrillo, a native of Sicily, comes to live in the house when the nursing home where she has been living burned down in a fire. Guest stars: Charles Levin as Coco; Frank Aletter as Harry; Meshach Taylor as the cop; F. William Parker as the Minister Notes: This is the only appearance of Coco, the gay cook/housekeeper. This episode won an Emmy Award for Outstanding Technical Direction/Camera/Video for a Series. Susan Harris was nominated for an Emmy Award for Outstanding Writing for a Comedy Series for this episode. The episode ranked as the highest-rated program of the week, bringing in a 25.0/43 rating/share, and was watched by an estimated 44 million viewers. This is the only episode in which Blanche's surname was given as "Hollingsworth." Although that is established as the character's maiden name, the Blanche character was known by her married surname Devereaux in all subsequent episodes.
2	2	"Guess Who's Coming to the Wedding?"	Paul Bogart	Winifred Hervey	September 21, 1985	004	22.5/40
Dorothy's daughter, Kate, visits and announces she is marrying her boyfriend, Dennis, a podiatrist. Dorothy insists on holding the wedding in Miami instead of the Bahamas, but Kate agrees only on the condition that her father, Dorothy's ex-husband Stan, a novelty salesman who cheated on Dorothy after 38 years of marriage, also comes. Still devastated by the divorce, Dorothy either avoids or takes offense at Stan on every encounter. After the reception, she ultimately vents out and bids him the last goodbye, although she admits she cannot completely get rid of him. Guest stars: Herb Edelman as Stan Zbornak; Lisa Jane Persky as Kate; Dennis Drake as Dennis Notes: Kate and Dennis reappeared in the second season played by Deena Freeman and Jonathan Perpich, respectively. This is Herb Edelman's first appearance as Stanley Zbornak.
3	3	"Rose the Prude"	Jim Drake	Barry Fanaro and Mort Nathan	September 28, 1985	006	19.0/32
Blanche invites Rose to go out with her date's brother. Rose meets Arnie, the first man she is romantically interested in since her husband died, and is torn about what to do when he invites her on a cruise. At the advice of the girls, she goes with him and ends up sleeping with him despite initial hesitations. Meanwhile, Dorothy and Sophia have a gin rummy marathon, with Dorothy unsuccessfully attempting to end her 30-year losing streak. Guest star: Harold Gould as Arnie Peterson Note: Harold Gould reappeared in later seasons in the recurring role of Rose's boyfriend Miles Weber.
4	4	"Transplant"	Paul Bogart	Susan Harris	October 5, 1985	005	21.8/37
Blanche's sister, Virginia, with whom she has a feud, comes to visit. She reveals that she is dying from renal failure, and a kidney transplant is her best hope for survival. After initially rejecting her, Blanche agrees to bury the hatchet and ultimately decides to give her one of her kidneys. In the end however, Virginia finds another donor, as Blanche is not qualified. Guest star: Sheree North as Virginia Hollingsworth Note: North reprised her role as Virginia in Season 5
5	5	"The Triangle"	Jim Drake	Winifred Hervey	October 19, 1985	009	18.6/30
Dorothy dates Sophia's attractive doctor, Elliot Clayton. He makes a pass at Blanche, offending her. When she follows Rose's advice to tell Dorothy what happened, Dorothy accuses her of being jealous and refuses to talk to her. The next morning, as Dr. Clayton invites Dorothy to play golf, Rose exposes the truth by ensuring Dorothy overhears him hitting on her as well. Guest star: Peter Hansen as Dr. Elliot Clayton Note: Bea Arthur was nominated for an Emmy Award for Outstanding Lead Actress in a Comedy for this episode.
6	6	"On Golden Girls"	Jim Drake	Liz Sage	October 26, 1985	007	18.6/31
Blanche's grandson David visits while his parents try to repair their marriage on a second honeymoon and upsets the entire household with his obnoxious, rebellious attitude. Guest star: Billy Jacoby as David Note: In real life, Billy Jacoby is the half-brother of Scott Jacoby, who played the recurring role of Dorothy's son Michael Zbornak.
7	7	"The Competition"	Jim Drake	Barry Fanaro and Mort Nathan	November 2, 1985	010	19.6/31
An old love interest of Sophia's, Augustine Bagatelli, visits from Sicily and the two enjoy each other's company to the point where he invites her back to Italy to visit her old friends, but Dorothy refuses to let her go. The girls all participate in a bowling tournament where Rose's competitiveness annoys the other girls and Dorothy and Sophia make a deal: if Sophia's team wins, she can go to Italy and if Dorothy's wins, she gets a piece of her mother's jewelry. Guest star: Ralph Manza as Augustine Bagatelli
8	8	"Break-In"	Paul Bogart	Susan Harris	November 9, 1985	003	19.0/29
The girls return home after a Madonna concert and find their home has been burgled. Rose is traumatized by the experience and eventually buys a gun to defend herself. However, after accidentally kneeing a parking attendant she mistook for a mugger, Rose discovers she can take care of herself without the use of weapons. Blanche obsesses over her "stolen" jewels, which turn out to have just been misplaced. Guest stars: Christian Clemenson as The Salesman; Robert Rothwell as Lester
9	9	"Blanche and the Younger Man"	Jim Drake	James Berg and Stan Zimmerman	November 16, 1985	011	23.2/36
Rose's mother, Alma, visits and friction results when Rose coddles her too much. Blanche goes on an exercise frenzy when a young man in her Jazzercise class asks her out and is embarrassed when it turns out he is interested in her in a different way than she thinks. Guest stars: Jeanette Nolan as Alma Lindstrom; Charles Hill as Dirk
10	10	"The Heart Attack"	Jim Drake	Susan Harris	November 23, 1985	013	23.6/37
After a successful dinner party, Sophia, convinced she is having a heart attack, tries to put her affairs in order. The girls become very worried when the paramedics cannot get to them because of a major rainstorm. Guest star: Ronald Hunter as Dr. Harris Note: Jim Drake was nominated for an Emmy Award for Outstanding Directing for a Comedy series for this episode.
11	11	"Stan's Return"	Jim Drake	Kathy Speer and Terry Grossman	November 30, 1985	012	23.2/37
Dorothy and Stan spend the night together, after he tells her that Chrissy, the young woman he left Dorothy for, left him. Dorothy sees it as an isolated incident, but Stan thinks of it as the two of them starting their relationship over. Guest stars: Herb Edelman as Stan Zbornak, Simone Griffeth as Chrissy
12	12	"The Custody Battle"	Terry Hughes	Winifred Hervey	December 7, 1985	014	20.3/33
Dorothy becomes frustrated with Sophia's meddling in her love life, so when Dorothy's wealthy sister, Gloria visits and asks Sophia to move in with her, Sophia agrees. Blanche is furious with Rose when Rose wins the part of Lady Macbeth in a local production of Macbeth and Blanche is cast as a witch. Guest star: Doris Belack as Gloria Note: Gloria was played by Dena Dietrich in season 7.
13	13	"A Little Romance"	Terry Hughes	Barry Fanaro and Mort Nathan	December 14, 1985	015	21.9/36
Rose dates Jonathan, a psychiatrist at the grief counseling center, but is reluctant to introduce him to the other girls. Blanche invites him over for dinner against Rose's wishes, and they find out he is a dwarf. When he tells Rose he has something important to discuss, she thinks he is planning to propose to her and is conflicted about whether to accept. After dreaming about marrying Jonathan and various figures giving her advice, she decides to continue the relationship, only to learn that he is breaking up with her because she isn't Jewish. Guest stars: Brent Collins as Dr. Jonathan Newman; Billy Barty as Edgar Lindstrom; Tony Carreiro as The Waiter; Jeane Dixon as herself Note: Barry Fanaro and Mort Nathan won an Emmy Award for Outstanding Writing in a Comedy Series for this episode. Terry Hughes was nominated for an Emmy Award for Outstanding Directing in a Comedy Series for this episode. Tony Carreiro appears in a later season 1 episode as Tommy Cochrane and in a season 5 episode as The Doctor.
14	14	"That Was No Lady"	Jim Drake	Liz Sage	December 21, 1985	008	19.3/33
Blanche, in need of the money for a new car, loans Rose her old car, promising to sell it to her if she likes it. Once Rose buys it, it begins breaking down and is eventually stolen. Dorothy falls head-over-heels in love with a gym teacher at the school where she is teaching and is devastated when he reveals he is married. Guest star: Alex Rocco as Glen O'Brien Note: Glen O'Brien returned in season 5, played by Jerry Orbach.
15	15	"In a Bed of Rose's"	Terry Hughes	Susan Harris	January 11, 1986	016	24.0/38
Rose's date dies while they are having sex, and since her late husband, Charlie, also died during sex, she vows never to sleep with another man again. The man turns out to have been married, upsetting Rose further, but is reassured when the autopsy reveals he was actually terminally ill, despite not knowing it. It's an even greater relief for Rose when she discovers the man was in an open marriage and his wife therefore condoned his philandering. Guest stars: Richard Roat as Al Beatty; Priscilla Morrill as Lucille Beatty Notes: Betty White won the award for Outstanding Lead Actress in a Comedy Series at the 1986 Emmy Awards for this episode. Richard Roat appeared in season 7 as Kendall in the episode, "The Case of the Libertine Belle".
16	16	"The Truth Will Out"	Terry Hughes	Susan Beavers	January 18, 1986	017	24.2/39
Rose's daughter, Kirsten, visits with her granddaughter to review estate papers and is furious with her mother when she finds Rose's late husband wasn't as much of a financial success as Rose led her to believe. Guest stars: Christine Belford as Kirsten; Bridgette Andersen as Charley Note: Kirsten was played by Lee Garlington in season 7.
17	17	"Nice and Easy"	Terry Hughes	Stuart Silverman	February 1, 1986	018	22.8/37
Blanche's niece, Lucy, visits and reveals herself to be even more promiscuous than Blanche. A mouse in the kitchen scares Dorothy, but she eventually gets over her fear and the mouse leaves after Dorothy asks it politely, thrilling Rose at her ability to communicate with animals. Guest star: Hallie Todd as Lucy
18	18	"The Operation"	Terry Hughes	Winifred Hervey	February 8, 1986	019	21.5/34
Dorothy aggravates an old foot injury (Morton's neuroma) while practicing a tap dancing routine with Rose and Blanche and refuses to get an operation that will heal the problem because of a fear of hospitals. Eventually, a breast cancer patient helps her realize how foolish she has been. Guest stars: Robert Picardo as Dr. Revell; Anne Haney as Bonnie; Belita Moreno as the nurse and Bill Quinn as the priest
19	19	"Second Motherhood"	Gary Shimokawa	Christopher Lloyd	February 15, 1986	020	21.7/33
Blanche accepts a marriage proposal from her wealthy businessman boyfriend, but is conflicted when she learns he has two young children who come second to his work. Dorothy and Rose renovate the bathroom, despite Sophia's insistence that they hire a sexist plumber for help. Guest stars: Kevin McCarthy as Richard; Terry Wills as plumber; Alan Blumenfeld as Lou
20	20	"Adult Education"	Jack Shea	James Berg and Stan Zimmerman	February 22, 1986	021	25.2/41
Dorothy is determined to get tickets to an upcoming Frank Sinatra concert, but keeps getting thwarted. Blanche takes a psychology course to get a promotion at the museum where she works. When she fails the midterm exam, she asks the professor for help and he offers to give her an A if she will sleep with him. Guest Stars: Jerry Hardin as Professor Cooper; James Staley as Dean Tucker Notes: Jerry Hardin appears in a season 4 episode as Gary Tucker. James Staley appears in a season 5 episode as Dr. Manning.
21	21	"The Flu"	Terry Hughes	James Berg and Stan Zimmerman	March 1, 1986	023	24.6/41
Blanche, Dorothy and Rose all come down with the flu and infuriate each other. When they each suspect that one of them has won a major award for their charity work, their competitiveness causes them all to attend despite their illness. Guest stars: Sharon Spelman as Dr. Richmond; William Cort as Dave; Ray Reinhardt as Harold; Marcelo Tubert as Raoul; Tony Carreiro as Tommy Cochrane; Dom Irrera as The Waiter; Silvana Gallardo as The Emcee Notes: Dom Irrera appears in the final episode of season 1 as The Produce Clerk. Tony Carreiro previously appeared in episode 13 as a waiter and later appears in a season 5 episode as The Doctor.
22	22	"Job Hunting"	Paul Bogart	Kathy Speer and Terry Grossman	March 8, 1986	002	22.3/37
The counseling center where Rose works closes and the girls become frustrated when people call the house at all hours for Rose's help. When they confront Rose about finding a new job, she says she has been a victim of age discrimination. Blanche gets a date with one of Rose's clients, but is dismayed to find out he only likes fat women. Dorothy goes out with an old flame who turns out to be gay. Note: This episode was the second one to be produced, but was held over for later in the season.
23	23	"Blind Ambitions"	Terry Hughes	Bob Colleary	March 29, 1986	024	21.8/38
Rose's blind sister Lily comes to visit from Chicago and begs Rose to move in with her and take care of her. The girls hold a garage sale to raise money for a new television, but find they cannot part with what they are selling. Guest star: Polly Holliday as Lily
24	24	"Big Daddy"	Terry Hughes	Barry Fanaro and Mort Nathan	May 3, 1986	022	21.7/39
Blanche's father, Big Daddy Hollingsworth, visits and shocks Blanche when he says he has sold their house to start a career as a country music singer. Dorothy feuds with the girls' next-door neighbor over storm damage. Guest stars: Murray Hamilton as Big Daddy Hollingsworth; Gordon Jump as Leonard Barton; Peggy Pope as Gladys Barton Note: Big Daddy was played by David Wayne in season 2, after the death of Murray Hamilton.
25	25	"The Way We Met"	Terry Hughes	Kathy Speer, Terry Grossman, Winifred Hervey, Mort Nathan, and Barry Fanaro	May 10, 1986	025	19.9/38
After watching the movie, Psycho, the girls reminisce about how they came to live together. Rose met Blanche in the supermarket as she put up an advertisement about her rooms for rent. Initially turned off by Rose's tame personality, she ultimately gave in after seeing Rose giving away a stray cat she had kept to a little boy who happened to lose his pet cat the week before. Responding to the ad, Dorothy visited the house with Sophia, with the former agreeing to move in. The day after Dorothy's move, they had a dispute at the supermarket, but reconciled at the dining table with the help of Rose's St. Olaf story. Guest stars: Edan Gross as little boy; Shirley Prestia as Madame Zelda; Dom Irrera as produce clerk Note: Rue McClanahan was nominated for an Emmy Award for Outstanding Lead Actress in a Comedy for this episode.

== Development ==
=== Conception ===
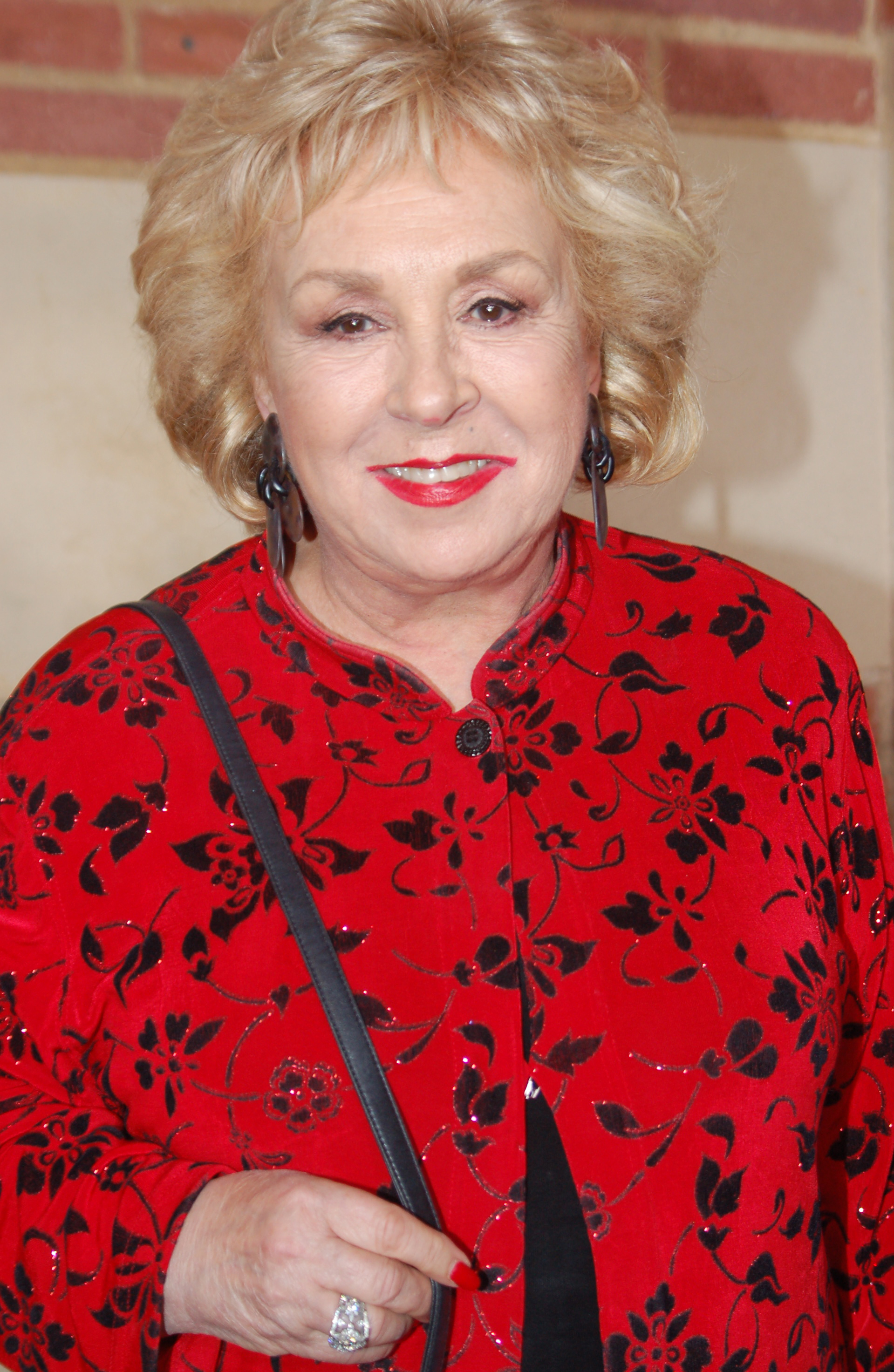
The Golden Girls was based on a parody performed by Selma Diamond and Doris Roberts (pictured).

NBC senior vice president Warren Littlefield conceived the idea of the series during the taping of a television special aimed at promoting the new 1984–85 season lineup. The special featured a skit by Night Court's Selma Diamond and Remington Steele's Doris Roberts promoting the upcoming show Miami Vice as Miami Nice, a parody about old people living in Miami, Florida. Amused by the performance, he visualized a series based on the geriatric humor of the female performers.

Littlefield met with producers Paul Junger Witt and Tony Thomas, who were pitching a series about a female lawyer, to ask about developing Miami Nice. Witt asked his wife, Susan Harris, to write the series after the duo's original writer had declined. Harris, who was planning on retiring after Thomas and her ABC series Soap, was interested, noting that "it was a demographic that had never been addressed." Though her vision of a sitcom about women in their 60s differed with NBC's request to write a comedy about women at the age of around 40, Littlefield was impressed when he received Harris' pilot script and subsequently approved production of the pilot. The Cosby Show director Jay Sandrich, who had previously worked with Harris, Witt, and Thomas on Soap, agreed to direct.

The pilot also includes the girls' gay houseboy, Coco (Charles Levin), who lived with them. Levin had been suggested by then-NBC president Brandon Tartikoff based on his groundbreaking recurring gay role, Eddie Gregg, on NBC's Emmy-winning drama, Hill Street Blues. After the pilot, the character of Coco was eliminated from the series.

=== Crew ===
The season aired on NBC in the United States on Saturday nights at 9:00 pm EST. Harris, her husband Paul Junger Witt, and Tony Thomas were the executive producers for the season. The season featured a panel of writers. Harris and Winifred Hervey each wrote five episodes for the season. Writing duos James Berg and Stan Zimmerman and Kathy Speer and Terry Grossman each wrote three episodes for the season, while Barry Fanaro and Mort Nathan wrote five episodes, including the season finale. Liz Sage wrote two episodes, and Susan Beavers, Bob Colleary, Christopher Lloyd, and Stuart Silverman were each credited for an episode.

Directors for the season included Paul Bogart, Jim Drake, Terry Hughes, Jay Sandrich, Jack Shea, and Gary Shimokawa. Bogart directed four episodes for the season. Hughes was credited for 10 episodes, and Drake received directing credits for eight episodes. Sandrich, Shea, and Shimokawa each directed one episode for the season.

=== Casting ===
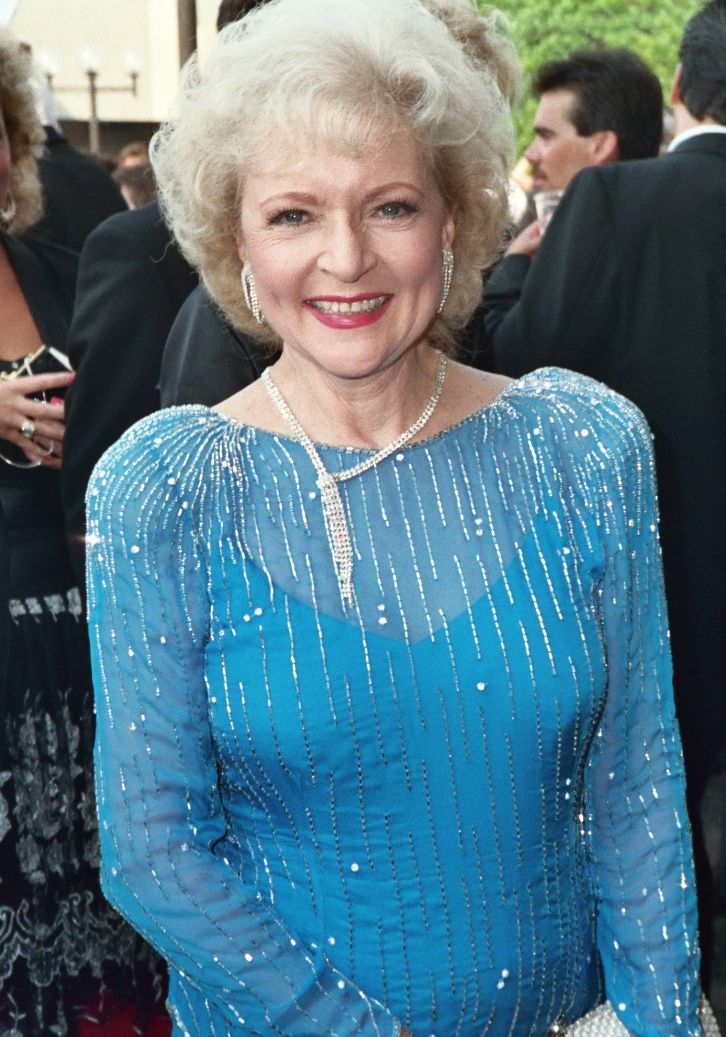
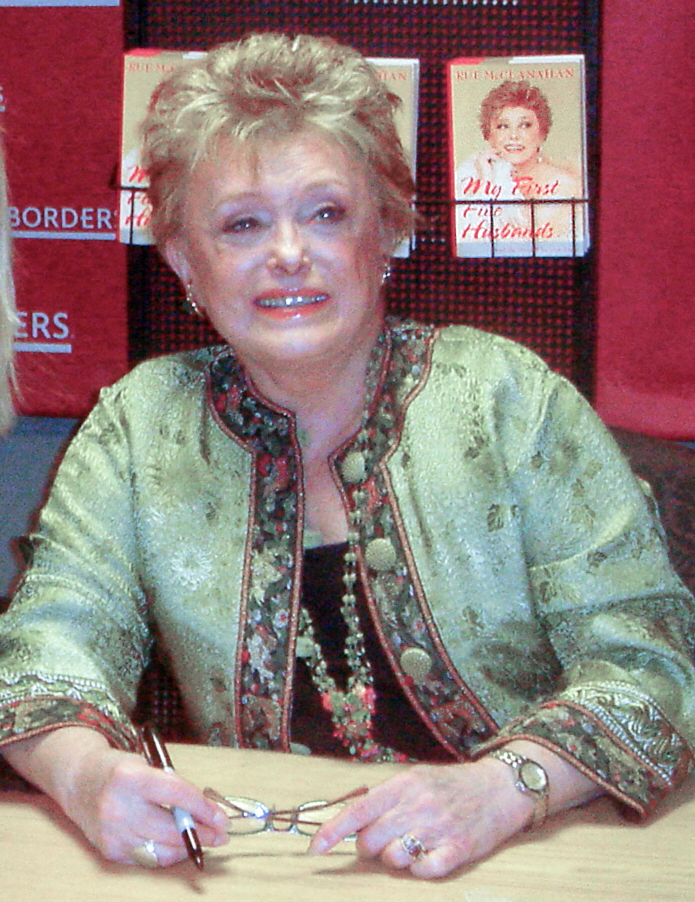
Betty White (pictured left) was originally planned to play Blanche until director Jay Sandrich suggested a switch between Rue McClanahan's (pictured right) role and hers.

Based on their previous work on Maude and The Mary Tyler Moore Show, Rue McClanahan and Betty White were considered for the parts of Rose Nylund, the bubbly Nordic woman, and Blanche Devereaux, the sexy siren, respectively. Sandrich, who was hired to film the pilot, suggested that the women switch roles to avoid typecasting.

The character of Dorothy Zbornak was tailored toward Bea Arthur, but being unavailable at the time, the producers looked at Elaine Stritch for the role. When her audition flopped, Harris asked McClanahan to convince Arthur, with whom she costarred on Maude, to take the role. Arthur flipped upon reading the script, but was apprehensive because of McClanahan's approach, as she did not "want to play (their Maude characters) Maude and Vivian meet Sue Ann Nivens." Arthur was further convinced when hearing that White would be playing Rose and McClanahan would be playing Blanche.

The role of Sophia Petrillo, Dorothy's mother, was played by Estelle Getty, who was discovered by Tony Thomas while performing in the Broadway play Torch Song Trilogy as the mother character. Getty, being younger than Arthur and White, wore heavy make-up, thick glasses, and a white wig to age her. The character of Sophia was thought by the creators to enhance the idea that three retirement-age women could be young. Disney's Michael Eisner explains, "Estelle Getty made our three women into girls. And that was, to me, what made it seem like it could be a contemporary, young show."

== Reception and accolades ==
=== Ratings ===
The Golden Girls debuted on September 14, 1985, in its 9:00 pm Saturday-night timeslot, following a broadcast of the Miss America contest and preceding another new comedy series, 227. The debut episode garnered a 25.0 household rating and a 43 share, which translates to a reach of 21.5 million homes. It was the highest-rated program of the week, and the highest-rated premiere of a program in two years. The show also elevated the ratings for Saturday nights, which were on a steep decline in the years preceding its debut. After five episodes, the series was averaging a 21.5 household rating, landing among the top-20 highest-rated programs.

=== Critical reception ===
When the first episode aired, New York Times writer Aljean Harmetz claimed that surprisingly, "nearly everybody is sure the show will be a hit." On Metacritic, a site which uses a weighted mean score, the season scored an 82/100 from six critics, translating to "universal acclaim".

=== Accolades ===
At the 38th Primetime Emmy Awards, The Golden Girls won the award for Outstanding Comedy Series. Bea Arthur, Rue McClanahan, and Betty White received nominations for Outstanding Lead Actress in a Comedy Series, with White winning for her performance in the episode "In a Bed of Rose's". Estelle Getty received a nomination for Outstanding Supporting Actress in a Comedy Series. Barry Fanaro and Mort Nathan won the Emmy award for Outstanding Writing for a Comedy Series for the episode "A Little Romance". Susan Harris also received nomination for the award for the pilot episode. Directors Jim Drake and Terry Hughes each received a nomination for Outstanding Directing for a Comedy Series for their work in "The Heart Attack" and "A Little Romance", respectively. At the 43rd Golden Globe Awards, the series won the award for Best Television Series – Musical or Comedy. The four lead actress were each nominated for the award for Best Actress – Television Series Musical or Comedy, with Getty tying with Cybill Shepherd for the award. Jay Sandrich won the Directors Guild of America Award for Outstanding Directing – Comedy Series for the episode "The Engagement" at the 38th Directors Guild of America Awards. Writers James Berg and Stan Zimmerman received a nomination at the 39th Writers Guild of America Awards for the episode "Blanche and the Younger Man." The series was also nominated at the 2nd TCA Awards for Outstanding Achievement in Comedy.

== DVD release ==
The first season was released on November 23, 2004, in North America. The set contains three discs, comprising 25 total episodes, and a fashion commentary bonus feature, in which Joan and Melissa Rivers provide a critique on the costumes worn by the main characters. The entire first season was also released in the series collection entitled The Golden Girls: 25th Anniversary Complete Collection, released on November 9, 2010.
