= The Golden Girls season 5 =

The Golden Girls
- Season 5
- DVD cover
- No. of episodes: 26

Release
- Original network: NBC
- Original release: September 23, 1989 – May 5, 1990

Season chronology
- ← Previous; Season 4 Next → Season 6

The fifth season of The Golden Girls premiered on NBC on September 23, 1989, and concluded on May 5, 1990. The season consisted of 26 episodes.

== Broadcast history ==
The season originally aired Saturdays at 9:00-9:30 pm (EST) on NBC from September 23, 1989, to May 5, 1990.

== Episodes ==
No. overall	No. in season	Title	Directed by	Written by	Original release date	Prod. code	U.S. viewers (millions)
103	1	"Sick and Tired"	Terry Hughes	Susan Harris	September 23, 1989	103	34.8
104	2	"Sick and Tired"	Terry Hughes	Susan Harris	September 30, 1989	104	34.8
Part 1: After five months of worsening fatigue and pain, Dorothy believes she is seriously ill. Two doctors tell her there's nothing wrong with her, as does a specialist whom Sophia then rebukes. Traveling with Rose to New York City, Dorothy sees neurologist Dr. Budd (Michael McGuire), who tells her she's just aging and any other problem is in her head, despite two psychiatric assessments that she's mentally healthy. Dorothy breaks down, thinking she may be crazy, but Rose reassures her that she is sick. Sophia fears losing Dorothy to an unknown disease. Blanche decides to become a novelist, but immediately suffers writer's block. Part 2: Harry refers Dorothy to Dr. Chang (Keone Young), who diagnoses her with chronic fatigue syndrome. Although there is no cure, Dorothy is relieved to put a name to her condition. She treats Sophia, Blanche, and Rose to dinner at a fancy restaurant, and sees Dr. Budd in the restaurant with his wife Helen (Bibi Besch). She confronts him, and Helen insists he hear Dorothy out. Dorothy laments his lost humanity and hopes he'll have a better doctor than himself when he needs one someday. Blanche stays awake for three days and deliriously writes a manuscript, but is rejected by publishers. She believes there will be nothing special about her if she fails to achieve fame, but Rose explains that her Minnesota upbringing taught her that friends and family are special. Special Guest Appearances by: Richard Mulligan as Dr. Harry Weston; Park Overall as Laverne; Guest stars: Jeffrey Tambor as Dr. Stevens (Part 1 only); Michael McGuire as Dr. Budd; Keone Young as Dr. Chang (Part 2); Bibi Besch as Helen Budd (Part 2); Glenn Walker Harris Jr. as Oliver (Part 2); Eric Poppick as The Waiter (Part 2); Note: This episode is a crossover with Empty Nest.
105	3	"Accurate Conception"	Terry Hughes	Gail Parent	October 14, 1989	105	28.4
Blanche's visiting daughter Rebecca (Debra Engle) intends to become a single mother through artificial insemination. Blanche objects; her friends share unusual details about their children's conceptions, but Blanche still considers it unnatural. A visit to a local sperm bank with her roommates and Becky also fails to convince Blanche, but Dorothy finally persuades Blanche to accept that Becky is an adult who must make her own decisions; Blanche apologizes. Dorothy succeeds in getting a reluctant Sophia to have a checkup. Guest stars: Debra Engle as Rebecca; James Staley as Dr. Manning; Kelly Ann Conn as Receptionist
106	4	"Rose Fights Back"	Terry Hughes	Marc Sotkin	October 21, 1989	106	30.7
When the company that Rose's husband worked for cuts off his pension, Rose must find a better-paying job. When she goes to a TV station to complain to their investigative reporter, Enrique Mas (Chick Vennera), of the age discrimination that she is facing, she finds that he needs an assistant — and gets the job. Meanwhile, Sophia goes wild buying things in quantity at a warehouse store. Guest stars: Chick Vennera as Enrique Mas; Beth Grant as Terry Franco; Note: Betty White was nominated for an Emmy Award for Outstanding Lead Actress in a Comedy Series for this episode.
107	5	"Love Under the Big Top"	Terry Hughes	Richard Vaczy and Tracy Gamble	October 28, 1989	108	28.8
Dorothy is dating a lawyer (Dick Van Dyke) and believes he is on the verge of proposing. However, he tells her he is leaving law to become a circus clown. Meanwhile, Rose and Blanche put together a protest to save dolphins from tuna fishermen. Special Guest Appearance by: Dick Van Dyke as Ken; Guest stars: Mel Stewart as Judge; John Di Santi as Fisherman; Note: Dick Van Dyke was nominated for an Emmy Award for Outstanding Guest Actor in a Comedy Series for this episode.
108	6	"Dancing in the Dark"	Terry Hughes	Phillip Jayson Lasker	November 4, 1989	110	31.0
Rose becomes romantically interested in her ballroom dancing partner Miles (Harold Gould), a college professor, but begins to doubt that the relationship can work when she meets his intelligent friends. Special Guest Star: Harold Gould as Miles; Guest stars: G.F. Smith as Gale; Mimi Cozzens as Lillian; John Ingle as Harry; Channing Chase as Elise; Edgar Justice as Mr. Morelli; Al Berry as Paul
109	7	"Not Another Monday"	Terry Hughes	Gail Parent	November 11, 1989	109	32.2
Sophia's friend Martha (Geraldine Fitzgerald) wants to commit suicide, and she wants Sophia there to hold her hand. Blanche, Rose, and Dorothy become singing nursemaids to a sick baby that they are taking care of for the weekend. Special Guest Appearance by: Richard Mulligan as Dr. Harry Weston; Guest stars: Geraldine Fitzgerald as Martha; Jayson Kane as Maitre D'; Doug Cox as Young Man; Bonnie Urseth as Young Woman; Note: This episode is a crossover with Empty Nest, that concludes in "Rambo of Neiman Marcus". Estelle Getty was nominated for an Emmy Award for Outstanding Supporting Actress in a Comedy Series for this episode.
110	8	"That Old Feeling"	Terry Hughes	Tom Whedon	November 18, 1989	107	33.6
Blanche is visited by her brother-in-law Jamie (George Grizzard) and is taken aback by his resemblance to her late husband George; Sophia secretly starts driving. Guest stars: George Grizzard as Jamie
111	9	"Comedy of Errors"	Terry Hughes	Don Reo	November 25, 1989	113	31.3
Dorothy finds a list of things that she wanted to accomplish before a certain age and realizes that she has not accomplished many of them, so she signs up to do stand-up comedy at a nightclub. Meanwhile, Blanche finds herself battling the Internal Revenue Service when they discover her failure to report her rental income, and Rose tries to figure out why an employee dislikes her. Guest stars: Oliver Clark as Roger; Tom La Grua as Jimmy
112	10	"All That Jazz"	Terry Hughes	Robert Bruce and Martin Weiss	December 2, 1989	111	30.1
Dorothy's son, Michael (Scott Jacoby), shows up on her doorstep with news that he has separated from his wife and needs a place to stay; Dorothy tires of his freeloading and dumps him on Stan, who also tires of him. Meanwhile, Rose is under much stress at work, but she is reluctant to ask Enrique Mas to cut back her duties. Special Guest Star: Herb Edelman as Stan; Guest stars: Scott Jacoby as Michael Zbornak; Stan Roth as Make-up Man; Chick Vennera as Enrique Mas
113	11	"Ebb Tide"	Terry Hughes	Marc Sotkin	December 9, 1989	112	31.4
When Blanche goes back to her childhood home for Big Daddy's funeral, she argues with her sister, Virginia (Sheree North), and decides not to attend. Meanwhile, Sophia tries to raise cash for a TV and rents out the girls' rooms in their absence. Guest stars: Sheree North as Virginia; Steven Gilborn as Howard; Paul Eiding as Peter; Brandis Kemp as Maddy
114	12	"Have Yourself a Very Little Christmas"	Terry Hughes	Tom Whedon	December 16, 1989	115	31.2
The ladies volunteer at a soup kitchen on Christmas and are shocked when Stan shows up, broke and needing a meal. Special Guest Star: Herb Edelman as Stan; Guest stars: Matt McCoy as Father Avery
115	13	"Mary Has a Little Lamb"	Terry Hughes	Harold Apter	January 6, 1990	117	34.8
The girls take in 16-year-old pregnant Mary (Julie McCullough), who has been thrown out of her home; Blanche's prison pen pal, Merrill (John Dennis Johnston), has just been released and is looking for her. Guest stars: Julie McCullough as Mary; John Dennis Johnston as Merrill; Lorry Goldman as Fred
116	14	"Great Expectations"	Terry Hughes	Robert Bruce and Martin Weiss	January 13, 1990	116	32.2
Rose joins a positive-thinking group and tries to get a pessimistic Dorothy to join. Meanwhile, Blanche is scared to get physical with her boyfriend Steven (Robert Mandan), especially after he has a heart attack. Guest stars: Robert Mandan as Steven; Michele Pawk as Mary Ellen; Kat Sawyer-Young as Woman
117	15	"Triple Play"	Terry Hughes	Gail Parent	January 27, 1990	119	33.0
Blanche tries to lure men by placing an ad for a Mercedes she does not intend to sell. Meanwhile, Rose has to deal with meeting Miles's daughter, Caroline (Molly Hagan); Dorothy discovers Sophia is hoarding Social Security money she's receiving, thanks to a computer error, in excess of her entitlement. Special Guest Star: Harold Gould as Miles; Guest stars: Molly Hagan as Caroline; Ronnie Schell as Thomas; Bill Cort as James; Note: Terry Hughes was nominated for an Emmy Award for Outstanding Directing for a Comedy Series for this episode.
118	16	"Clinton Avenue Memoirs"	Terry Hughes	Richard Vaczy & Tracy Gamble	February 3, 1990	114	32.4
Sophia decides to try to regain some of the memories she has lost by taking a trip to Brooklyn to see their old apartment. Meanwhile, Blanche works for Rose. Guest stars: Sid Melton as Salvadore Petrillo; Kyle Hefner as young Salvadore; David Correia as Mr. Hernandez, Flo Di Re as young Sophia, Jandi Swanson as young Dorothy.
119	17	"Like the Beep Beep Beep of the Tom-Tom"	Terry Hughes	Phillip Jayson Lasker	February 10, 1990	120	31.0
Blanche has a pacemaker implanted, and is afterward so scared of intimacy that she decides to give up sex. Guest stars: Robert Culp as Simon; Peter Michael Goetz as Dr. Stein
120	18	"An Illegitimate Concern"	Terry Hughes	Marc Cherry and Jamie Wooten	February 12, 1990	118	28.2
Blanche is stunned when a young man named David (Mark Moses) comes to the house and claims to be the illegitimate son of her late husband George; Dorothy and Sophia enter a mother-daughter pageant at Shady Pines. Guest stars: Mark Moses as David
121	19	"72 Hours"	Terry Hughes	Richard Vaczy and Tracy Gamble	February 17, 1990	121	31.3
Rose is afraid that a blood transfusion that she had six years ago may have contained HIV-infected blood, and has to wait three days for her test results (hence the episode's title); Sophia reacts poorly to the possibility of having an HIV-positive roommate. Meanwhile, Dorothy struggles to put together a charity function to save the local wetlands. Guest stars: Tony Carreiro as the Doctor; Peggy Walton-Walker as receptionist.
122	20	"Twice in a Lifetime"	Terry Hughes	Robert Bruce and Martin Weiss	February 24, 1990	122	32.1
Rose must decide between her boyfriend, Miles, and an old boyfriend (Eddie Bracken) who wants her to go to Europe with him. Meanwhile, fed up with Dorothy's rules, Sophia decides to move out. Special Guest Star: Harold Gould as Miles; Guest stars: Eddie Bracken as Buzz; April Ortiz as Maria; Douglas Seale as Malcolm
123	21	"Sisters and Other Strangers"	Terry Hughes	Marc Cherry and Jamie Wooten	March 3, 1990	123	31.0
Blanche and her sister, Charmaine (Barbara Babcock), reconcile after a lifelong rivalry, until Blanche reads her sister's recently published romance novel and realizes that the heroine is based on her. Stan's visiting cousin Magda (Marian Mercer) from Czechoslovakia, wears out her welcome doing nothing but extolling the virtues of Communism. Guest stars: Barbara Babcock as Charmaine; Marian Mercer as Magda
124	22	"Cheaters"	Terry Hughes	Tom Whedon	March 24, 1990	124	30.3
Glen O’Brien (Jerry Orbach), the married man Dorothy dated, re-enters her life with news that he is now divorced and would like to reconcile with her; Blanche and Sophia become the victims of a con game at the mall. Guest stars: Jerry Orbach as Glen; Sam McMurray as Mr. Kane; Nancy Lenehan as Nun; Note: Jerry Orbach was nominated for an Emmy Award for Outstanding Guest Actor in a Comedy Series for this episode.
125	23	"The Mangiacavallo Curse Makes a Lousy Wedding Present"	Terry Hughes	Phillip Jayson Lasker	March 31, 1990	125	30.0
The girls attend the wedding of Dorothy's goddaughter, who is marrying the grandson of a man who was once engaged to Sophia. Sophia thinks that the wedding reception is the perfect spot for revenge. Rose, however, is dreading the ceremony due to her tendency to become sexually aroused at weddings. Dorothy asks to grab one of Blanche's former dates for her ceremony accompaniment, but gets mad at Blanche for her advances to him. Guest stars: Howard Duff as Mangiacavallo; Stuart Nisbet as Doug; Tanya Louise as Jenny; Paul Collins as Man, Jonathan Schmock as Waiter and Myles Berkowitz as Groom.
126	24	"All Bets Are Off"	Terry Hughes	Eugene B. Stein	April 28, 1990	126	22.4
Dorothy's gambling problem re-surfaces after a visit to the racetrack; Rose takes up painting; and Blanche is insulted when a co-worker rejects her advances. Guest stars: Michael Ensign as Donald
127	25	"The President's Coming! The President's Coming!"	Lex Passaris	Marc Sotkin, Gail Parent, Martin Weiss, Robert Bruce, Philip Jayson Lasker, Tom Whedon, Marc Cherry, and Jamie Wooten	May 5, 1990	127	24.1
128	26	"The President's Coming! The President's Coming!"	Lex Passaris	Marc Sotkin, Gail Parent, Martin Weiss, Robert Bruce, Philip Jayson Lasker, Tom Whedon, Marc Cherry, and Jamie Wooten	May 5, 1990	128	24.1
The girls learn that President Bush (voiced by Harry Shearer) is coming to Miami and their house is a possible stop on his way to a retirement home. The girls reminisce as a Secret Service agent (Timothy Stack) does background checks. Special Guest Star: Herb Edelman as Stan; Guest stars: Timothy Stack as Agent Bell; Harry Shearer as Voice of George Bush

== Awards and nominations ==
42nd Primetime Emmy Awards

- Nomination for Outstanding Comedy Series
- Nomination for Outstanding Lead Actress in a Comedy Series (Betty White) (Episode: "Rose Fights Back")
- Nomination for Outstanding Supporting Actress in a Comedy Series (Estelle Getty) (Episode: "Not Another Monday")
- Nomination for Outstanding Guest Actor in a Comedy Series (Jerry Orbach) (Episode: "Cheaters")
- Nomination for Outstanding Guest Actor in a Comedy Series (Dick Van Dyke) (Episode: "Love Under the Big Top")
- Nomination for Outstanding Directing for a Comedy Series (Terry Hughes) (Episode: "Triple Play")

47th Golden Globe Awards

- Nomination for Best Comedy Series
