= 72 Hours (Golden Girls) =

- The Golden Girls episode
- Episode no.: Season 5 Episode 19
- Directed by: Terry Hughes
- Written by: Richard Vaczy; Tracy Gamble
- Original air date: February 17, 1990

Guest appearances
- Tony Carreiro as Doctor; Peggy Walton-Walker as Receptionist

Episode chronology
| ← Previous "An Illegitimate Concern" | Next → "Twice in a Lifetime" |
- The Golden Girls season 5

"72 Hours" is the 19th episode of the fifth season of the American sitcom The Golden Girls. Written by Richard Vaczy and Tracy Gamble and directed by Terry Hughes, it originally aired on February 17, 1990. The episode centers on Rose Nylund (Betty White) after she is notified that a blood transfusion she received years earlier may have exposed her to HIV. As Rose waits 72 hours for her test results, Dorothy (Bea Arthur), Blanche (Rue McClanahan) and Sophia (Estelle Getty) support her while confronting fear, misinformation and stigma surrounding HIV/AIDS.

The story was inspired by an experience involving Gamble's mother, and the writers consulted HIV specialists at UCLA while developing the script. In retrospective commentary, "72 Hours" has been noted for its handling of HIV/AIDS and has been ranked among the series' best episodes.

== Plot ==
While the girls prepare for a wetlands fundraiser, Rose receives a letter from St. Luke's Hospital stating that a blood transfusion she received six years earlier during gallbladder surgery may have contained HIV antibodies. The letter advises her to be tested. Alarmed, Rose goes to the hospital with Dorothy and Blanche. At reception, she gives Dorothy's name after being encouraged to use a false one to avoid stigma. In the waiting room, Blanche reassures Rose by telling her she has been tested for HIV in the past as well. After Rose is tested, the doctor tells her she must return in three days for the results.

Over the next three days, Rose becomes increasingly anxious about the possibility of a positive diagnosis and how it might affect her life. Sophia reacts fearfully, avoiding the bathroom Rose uses by using Dorothy's bathroom and even stopping at a gas station. She also marks Rose's coffee cups with a capital "R". Dorothy confronts Sophia about her behavior. Sophia insists she understands that HIV cannot be transmitted that way, but admits she is frightened.

Later, Rose talks with Blanche at the kitchen table and says, "This isn't supposed to happen to people like me." Blanche challenges Rose's assumption and angrily tells her that AIDS is not "a bad person's disease" and not a punishment for sin. Dorothy, Blanche, and Sophia then agree to support Rose regardless of her results; Sophia demonstrates this by drinking from one of Rose's marked cups.

After three days, the women return to the hospital together. Rose's test results are negative, and they leave relieved, resuming plans for the fundraiser that evening.

== Production ==
"72 Hours" was written by Tracy Gamble and Richard Vaczy. Vaczy said he and Gamble were drawn to depicting the anxiety of the waiting period between testing and receiving results, but recalled that the subject matter hit close to home for the cast and crew, making it "the darkest week [he] ever experienced on that stage".

Gamble said the storyline was inspired by her mother being advised to get tested after having received a blood transfusion within a specified period, and described the waiting period as "hell". Before writing the episode, Gamble and Vaczy consulted HIV specialists at UCLA about what information to include, particularly around the importance of support and counselling alongside test results.

Editor Peter D. Beyt said that, while working on the series, he learned his partner was HIV-positive and confided in Estelle Getty, whose nephew was also HIV-positive.

== Reception ==
In 2020, Variety included "72 Hours" at number 10 in its ranking of the series' 25 best episodes.

In a 2014 NPR opinion piece, Barbara Fletcher wrote that the episode helped bring conversations about AIDS into mainstream living rooms at a time when myths and misinformation about testing and transmission were widespread. In 2017, Time reported on Betty White's comments about the episode, noting that she described it as a "daring" storyline and suggested the decision to center it on Rose made the premise more unexpected for viewers.

Writing for Nursing Clio, Claire Sewell argued that the episode became memorable for portraying fear and uncertainty around HIV/AIDS with humor and sensitivity while also depicting the stigma surrounding testing.

Academic commentary has similarly emphasized the episode's critique of stigma. In her doctoral dissertation, Sascha Cohen wrote that the script directs social shame toward paranoia about AIDS rather than toward the person awaiting test results, and that it framed HIV/AIDS as relevant to audiences who might otherwise have seen themselves as outside the epidemic. Jared Clayton Brown, in a master's thesis, highlighted how the episode uses Sophia's misconceptions and Blanche's confrontation of Rose to challenge moral judgments about HIV/AIDS and to counter the assumption that certain groups are not vulnerable to infection.
