= Brotherly Love (1995 TV series) =

American television sitcom (1995–1997)

- Genre: Sitcom
- Created by: Jim Vallely; Jonathan Schmock
- Starring: Joey Lawrence; Matthew Lawrence; Andrew Lawrence; Michael McShane; Liz Vassey; Melinda Culea
- Theme music composer: Joey Lawrence, Michael Price, Steve LaGassick, and Steve Barri
- Opening theme: "No Matter Where You Are", performed by Joey Lawrence
- Country of origin: United States
- Original language: English
- No. of seasons: 2
- No. of episodes: 40

Production
- Executive producers: Jonathan Schmock; Jim Vallely; Paul Junger Witt; Tony Thomas; Gary S. Levine
- Camera setup: Videotape; Multi-camera
- Running time: 22 minutes
- Production companies: Witt/Thomas Productions; Touchstone Television (1995–1996; season 1); Walt Disney Television (1996–1997; season 2)

Original release
- Network: NBC
- Release: September 16, 1995 – April 1, 1996
- Network: The WB
- Release: September 15, 1996 – May 18, 1997

Brotherly Love is an American television sitcom that aired from September 16, 1995, to April 1, 1996, on NBC, and then moved to The WB for its second season, where it aired from September 15, 1996, to May 18, 1997. Created by Jonathan Schmock and Jim Vallely, the series primarily centered on the relationship between three paternal half-brothers, Joe, Matt and Andy Roman (respectively played by real-life brothers Joey, Matthew and Andrew Lawrence), as well as Joe’s efforts to navigate his relationships with his stepmother and his mechanic co-workers at the automotive garage he partially inherited from his late father.

Set in the Lawrence brothers’ real-life hometown of Philadelphia, (Note: Joey, Matthew and Andrew were all born in the Northeast Philadelphia suburb of Abington Township.) the show’s title is a play on the city’s nickname, “The City of Brotherly Love”, tying into the central relationship between the Roman brothers. The series was produced by Witt/Thomas Productions, in association with Touchstone Television for the first season and Walt Disney Television for the second season; it was distributed by Touchstone/Disney sister company Buena Vista Television.

== Premise ==
While embarking on a cross-country motorcycle journey from California to Florida, 20-year-old Joe Roman (Joey Lawrence) arrives in Philadelphia with the intention of selling his 25% share in Roman Customizing, an automotive customization shop that he inherited from his late father, Mike, to his stepmother, Claire (Melinda Culea), in order to use the profits to support his aspiring career as a race car driver. Claire, who co-owned the shop with Mike and inherited his share, assumed responsibility for managing her husband’s business, located on the first floor of a mixed-use building, after he was killed in a racing accident the year before.

After Joe's parents, Mike and Amber, divorced when he was five, he kept a somewhat close relationship with his father, occasionally visiting Mike, Claire and their two sons growing up; however, he struggled to accept Claire as his stepmother. During his visit, Joe reconnects with his younger paternal half-brothers, who live with their mother in the apartment upstairs from the shop: 15-year-old Matt (Matthew Lawrence), a neurotic teenager who deals with various real and imagined adolescent crises and initially harbors resentment toward Joe for his treatment towards him as a child; and 7-year-old Andy (Andrew Lawrence), an imaginative and precocious youngster who, particularly in the first season, had a penchant for disguising himself as various alter egos and creating imaginary friends.

After Joe learns that, despite Claire’s diligent efforts to keep it running, Roman Customizing is struggling financially and at risk of going under, he ultimately decides to accept her offer to move in and help with both running the business and caring for his half-brothers. At the auto garage, Joe works alongside Lloyd Burwell (Mike McShane), his father's eccentric former pit-crew chief, and Louise “Lou” Davis (Liz Vassey), an attractive, feisty mechanic and aspiring conceptual artist. Episode storylines typically center on Joe’s developing relationships with his stepfamily and working relationships with Lloyd and Lou, Matt and Andy’s antics and personal issues, and the (ultimately unresolved) romantic tension between Joe and Lou.

== Characters ==
=== Main ===
- Joey Lawrence as Joe Roman, an aspiring racer who takes part ownership of his late father's garage. Hoping to sell his share to finance his racing career, he instead agrees to share ownership and stay to run the garage with his stepmother as a chance to get to know his half-brothers Matt and Andy.
- Matthew Lawrence as Matt Roman, Joe's younger paternal half-brother. He is socially awkward and neurotic but looks up to Joe, hoping to learn how to be cool from his older brother.
- Andrew Lawrence as Andy Roman, Joe's younger paternal half-brother. He has a vivid imagination and sense of humor and has a fondness for dressing up in various costumes. He looks up to Joe as a surrogate father figure in the wake of their father's passing.
- Michael McShane (Note: Credited as “Micheal McShane”.) as Lloyd Burwell, a friend of the family and a mechanic at the garage.
- Liz Vassey as Louise "Lou" Davis, another mechanic at the garage and an aspiring artist. She and Joe have a relationship that swings from sibling-like bickering to deep mutual attraction. She is a close friend of Claire's, being the only other female of the group, and often acts as a big sister to Matt and Andy.
- Melinda Culea as Claire Roman, Joe's stepmother. She and Joe initially had a rocky relationship as Joe blamed her for his parents' divorce. He and Claire soon make amends and become partners in the garage. Though he never treats Claire as a mother, he still comes to regard her as family as they acknowledge their shared struggle in the loss of Joe's father.

=== Supporting ===
- Rebecca Herbst as Kristin, a female friend of Matt's. Matt harbors an unspoken crush on her and, when he finally does speak of it, she does not reciprocate his feelings, having developed an attraction to Joe. They, however, remain good friends and she tries to pursue a relationship with Joe with Matt's blessing.
- Karl David-Djerf as Silent Jim, another friend of Matt's. Similar to film character Silent Bob, Silent Jim does not speak very often but usually offers profound insight when he does.

== Episodes ==
=== Series overview ===
Season	Episodes	Originally released			Rank	Avg. rating share
Season	Episodes	First released	Last released	Network	Rank	Avg. rating share
1	16	September 16, 1995	April 1, 1996	NBC	104 (Note: Tied with America's Most Wanted, Martin and the NBC Saturday Night Movie.)	6.7
2	24	September 15, 1996	May 18, 1997	The WB	160 (Note: Tied with Sunday airings of Nick Freno: Licensed Teacher; secondary Sunday run (rank #158/2.2 rating) tied with Life with Roger.)	1.9

=== Season 1 (1995–96) ===
No. overall	No. in season	Title	Directed by	Written by	Original release date	Prod. code	Viewers (millions)
1	1	"Pilot"	Terry Hughes	Jim Vallely & Jonathan Schmock	September 16, 1995	001	9.3
Joe's parents are divorced and he moves away with his mom and his dad later starts a new life with his new wife Claire. His dad and Claire have two sons named Matt and Andy, and after their dad dies in a racing accident, Joe goes to them to collect his share of his dad's garage. Guest stars: Melissa Clayton as Andrea and Jerry Lambert as Mitch
2	2	"Such a Bargain"	Terry Hughes	Jim Halkett	September 17, 1995	003	8.6
Lou makes an art sculpture that catches the interest of Russell Winslow (Bryan Cranston), an art dealer who comes by, but Joe does not trust the man. Meanwhile, Matt becomes so interested in a female classmate that he does everything in his power to impress her, including ordering a limo for the school dance. Guest star: Mike Starr as Gus
3	3	"The Liberty Bell Show"	Terry Hughes	Craig Hoffman	September 24, 1995	005	6.9
Matt has a crush on his forensics teacher, Debbie (Tyler Layton), and arranges to have her busted car fixed for free at the garage. But when Joe meets Debbie, Joe develops romantic feelings for her as well, leading to conflict with the half-brothers. Meanwhile, Andy visits the Liberty Bell on a class field trip and fears that he accidentally "damaged" the bell. Guest star: Hiram Kasten as Tour Guide
4	4	"A Midsummer's Nightmare"	Terry Hughes	Pamela Eells	October 1, 1995	006	7.9
Matt gets a part in a school play and Joe keeps teasing Matt about his role in the school's production of William Shakespeare's "A Midsummer Night's Dream". This ends up hurting Matt's confidence, but Joe needs to build confidence himself when he agrees to be a nude model for Lou's art class. Guest stars: Justine Johnston as Mrs. Maguire and Jonathan Charles Kaplan as Ira Stoltzer
5	5	"Uptown Girl"	Terry Hughes	Michelle J. Wolff	October 8, 1995	002	10.5
Joe deserts his responsibilities when he meets a free-spirited woman. Andy makes a new friend after taking Joe's advice. Matt also takes Joe's advice but this makes him uncool at school. Guest stars: Terry Bradshaw as Himself, Mathea Webb as Christy, Jonathan Charles Kaplan as Ira Stoltzer, Victor Raider-Wexler as Mr. Levenstein
6	6	"The Comic Con"	Terry Hughes	John Levenstein	October 25, 1995	008	9.5
Lloyd meets Lotus (Megan Cavanaugh), a woman on the internet and he is so interested in her, that he lies about his appearance to make the woman like him. Meanwhile, Matt gets a pimple and tries everything to hide it in time for his first date. Guest star: George Takei as Himself
7	7	"The Sleepover Show"	Terry Hughes	Eddie Gorodetsky	October 29, 1995	004	7.7
Bridget (Wendy Benson) an old friend from high school visits Joe and he invites her to spend the night. Matt accidentally sees the girl get out of the shower, causing Claire to tell Joe he is setting a bad example for the younger boys. Andy, meanwhile, cannot tell his mom that he is not ready to go to a sleepover party at a neighbor's house and winds up sneaking downstairs to Joe's room to avoid his mother, ending up spending the evening with Joe and Bridget instead. Guest star: Jonathan Charles Kaplan as Ira Stoltzer
8	8	"Witchcraft"	Terry Hughes	Jonathan Schmock	October 30, 1995	007	13.0
A fortuneteller gives Joe a Halloween scare, as well as Andy's "disappearance"; Claire goes to a party on her own, while Matt endures the taunts of college-age trick-or-treaters. And Lloyd watches the "scariest movie ever made": The Sound of Music. Special guest star: John Kassir as The Crypt-Keeper Guest stars: Laura Summer as Julie, Brandt Van Hoffman as Missing Sock and Melanie Hutsell as Wilma Note: Rondell Sheridan and Camille Winbush (of the fellow NBC and Witt/Thomas Productions sitcom Minor Adjustments) guest starred in this episode, however they are not credited for their appearance. Minor Adjustments followed Brotherly Love on NBC's Sunday night Fall lineup at the time.
9	9	"Bait and Switch"	Terry Hughes	John Levenstein	November 12, 1995	010	6.1
A conspiratorial Lloyd locks up Joe and Lou in the storeroom on a day that Lou has arranged a blind date to get them to fall in love. But he could not have chosen a worse day because Joe has promised to aid Matt in a date with destiny – a fight with a school bully.
10	10	"Outbreak!"	Terry Hughes	Craig Hoffman	November 19, 1995	011	6.1
Claire, Andy, and Lloyd have the chicken pox, because of this Claire cannot do her work leaving Joe in charge. Joe makes an executive decision to expand Roman Customizing by signing a new account – one that Claire had turned down.
11	11	"A Roman Holiday"	Terry Hughes	Jim Vallely	December 18, 1995	013	12.0
Christmas morning is coming and Andy told Lloyd to tell Santa what he wanted for Christmas. Lloyd promised Andy that Santa would come through for him but finds himself in a bind when he is unable to pull it off.
12	12	"Once Around the Block"	Terry Hughes	Jonathan Schmock	March 4, 1996	012	13.2
Matt hopes to shed his boring image by catching some action at a salsa dance club. When his mom and Lou suddenly show up, as does Lloyd, he does not know what to do. Andy is thrilled when Joe works on a car that is oddly similar to the Batmobile. Guest stars: Jonathan Charles Kaplan as Ira Stoltzer, Gina Gallego as Lupe and Stephen Lee as Cop
13	13	"Remember"	Terry Hughes	Pamela Eells	March 11, 1996	016	12.6
Claire becomes worried about Joe, when he decides that he wants to race just like his dad. Meanwhile, Matt gets a job at Lucky Burger and then auditions to be the restaurant's mascot. Guest stars: Nestor Carbonell as Eduardo Vega, Tom Kenny as Doug and Jonathan Charles Kaplan as Ira Stoltzer
14	14	"Big Brotherly Love"	Terry Hughes	Jonathan Schmock & Jim Vallely	March 18, 1996	018	10.8
Matt and Andy think that Jack (Tom Arnold), a man who Claire enlisted to be a mentor to Matt and Andy as part of the Big Brothers program, is great, but to Joe, Jack is trying to replace their dad. Guest stars: Billy West as Billy and Jimmy Briscoe as Jimmy Note: Tom Arnold and Andrew Lawrence previously worked together on the CBS sitcom Tom.
15	15	"Bride and Prejudice"	Terry Hughes	Michelle J. Wolff	March 25, 1996	015	12.3
Lou's boyfriend Josh proposes to her and now she has to make a difficult decision: accept or try to make it work with Joe. Matt's new friends make fun of Lloyd.
16	16	"Double Date"	Jonathan Schmock	John Levenstein	April 1, 1996	014	12.1
Joe is annoyed is with his latest squeeze Amy (Lisa Rieffel), Lou feels the same way about her latest fling Tom (Peter Krause), They suggest to double date and they hope their dates will fall for each other. Matt grows out of spending time with childhood best friend Lance.

=== Season 2 (1996–97) ===
No. overall	No. in season	Title	Directed by	Written by	Original release date	Prod. code	Viewers (millions)
17	1	"Lord of the Guys"	Art Dielhenn	Bill Vallely & Mark McClennan	September 15, 1996	020/202	3.1
Lou takes Claire away from the house for a girl's weekend at a spa and the boys have to look after themselves. Luckily for Joe and Andy, Matt knows what to do. Guest star: Maya Turley as Annica Note: Starting with this episode, the series moved to The WB.
18	2	"Joe at 21"	Art Dielhenn	Eddie Gorodetsky	September 22, 1996	019/201	3.6
It is Joe's 21st birthday, he spends the night in a bar thinking about his dad. The rest are planning a surprise party for him, when Joe gets home he is drunk. Guest star: Blake Clark as Mickey
19	3	"Claire's First Date"	Art Dielhenn	John Levenstein	September 29, 1996	022/204	3.2
Claire prepares for her first real date since her husband's death with Ed, a pool buddy of Joe's. Matt and Andy dislike him because they think it is a replacement of their father. Guest star: Sid Melton as Delivery Man
20	4	"Other People"	Art Dielhenn	Jim Vallely	October 6, 1996	030/212	4.1
Joe and Lou agree to be "just friends" and date other people, but Joe fumes when Lou's "other person" is someone named Mel, he does not know – and then he unwittingly asks out Lou's best friend Melanie Marcos (Jennifer Aspen), the Mel to which Lou was referring. Marc Weiner stops by the shop, to have his puppet truck customized.
21	5	"Viva la Fraternite"	Jonathan Schmock	Jonathan Schmock	October 13, 1996	023/205	3.4
Both Joey and Matt ask Andy's new baby sitter for a date. Meanwhile, Lloyd gets a really big toupee which everyone is scared of. Meanwhile, Lou looks forward to seeing her father but once again he does not know if he will show up. Guest stars: Veena Bidasha as Ava, Neena Bidasha as Eva and Linden Chiles as Chuck
22	6	"Big Mike"	Art Dielhenn	Craig Hoffman	October 20, 1996	021/203	3.7
The boys are really excited when their grandfather Big Mike (Gil Gerard) comes by for a visit, they all have a great time, but Mike makes some promises he cannot keep. Guest star: Blaire Baron as Millie
23	7	"Motherly Love"	Art Dielhenn	Bill Vallely & Mark McClennan	November 3, 1996	024/206	3.2
Lloyd's RV-driving mom Myrna (Estelle Getty) visits the garage. At the same time, Joe is pushing Andy to enter in a pine-box derby – to prevent a business rival's son from beating Matt's previous winning record. Guest stars: Lee Arenberg as Pasternack and Aron Eisenberg as Little Ricky
24	8	"Kernel of Truth"	Art Dielhenn	Ricky Blitt	November 10, 1996	025/207	3.2
Andy figures he will not get into any more trouble in school if Joe dates his stern but attractive teacher Miss Harper (Tricia Leigh Fisher). Claire dates Jimmy (Tony Carreiro), a man she met at the supermarket, who has serious mommy issues. Psychology student Matt fears he may have obsessive-compulsive disorder.
25	9	"Downtown Girl"	Art Dielhenn	Nicole Avril & Sue Kolinsky	November 17, 1996	026/208	3.6
Joe meets Phoebe D. (Andrea Bendewald), an old classmate who is heading towards stardom in her music career, this makes him think about the decisions he has made in his life. Matt is stuck doing a science assignment with Lydia Lump (Jodie Sweetin), a nerdy classmate. Note: During the closing credits, the song "Class Act", performed by guest star Andrea Bendewald as Phoebe D. is played.
26	10	"The Great Indoors"	Art Dielhenn	Nicole Avril & Sue Kolinsky	November 24, 1996	027/209	4.1
Andy is proud of getting his wilderness badge, he wants to wear this on the camping trip that his pioneers group was planning. Thanks to a storm the trip gets cancelled, but they end up having the camping trip in the garage. Meanwhile, Claire and Lou have a girls movie night and end up bawling in tears with every movie they watch. Guest stars: Jennifer Lyons as Patty and Portia Dawson as Suzie
27	11	"The Driving Lesson"	Terry Hughes	Eddie Gorodetsky	December 8, 1996	009	2.2
A merciless driver's-ed teacher Mr. Hangarter (Keene Curtis) may have Matt's future in mind when he passes out grades, but Joe has only revenge in mind when he rallies Matt, Lloyd, and Lou in playing a prank on the man in order to get back at him. Note: This episode was originally produced for the first season, but its original broadcast was held over until the second season.
28	12	"Power of Love"	Art Dielhenn	Michelle J. Wolff	December 8, 1996	029/211	2.3
Eduardo returns to turn to town sweeping Lou off her feet romantically, much to Joe's chagrin. Getting advice from Eduardo, Matt says meaningless "I Love You's" to date attractive girls. After listening to numerous self-help tapes, Lloyd decides to quit his job at the garage to try and fulfill his dreams. Claire is worried that Andy is emulating Joe's lack of affection for other people. Guest stars: Luigi Amodeo as Eduardo Vega (previously played by Nestor Carbonell in season one) and Sid Melton as Captain Speedy
29	13	"Party Girl"	Jonathan Schmock	Jim Vallely	January 12, 1997	032/214	2.24
Kristin (Rebecca Herbst) is a new girl in Matt's life. Everyone around him agrees that Kristin is out of his league because the girl drinks and goes to rave parties, but Matt protests. Guest star: Phil Proctor as Art Dealer
30	14	"Skin Deep"	Paul Miller	Ricky Blitt	January 19, 1997	033/215	3.81
Matt and Kristen are still hanging out together, she then sets Matt up with Carly (Elisabeth Harnois) a depressive girl who wants him to get a tattoo. Meanwhile, Joe and Lou think that Lloyd has developed romantic feelings for Claire.
31	15	"Paging Nell"	Jonathan Schmock	Story by : Liz Sagal; Teleplay by : Matt Schmidt & Anita Michetti	February 2, 1997	031/213	3.03
Joe is reunited with his old friend next door neighbor Nell Bascombe (Nell Carter), who needs a new kidney. Guest star: Ivory Ocean as Lenny Note: Nell Carter previously co-starred with Joey Lawrence and Matthew Lawrence in the 1980s NBC sitcom Gimme a Break!.
32	16	"The Comet"	Joey Lawrence	Jim Vallely & Jonathan Schmock	February 9, 1997	028/210	2.77
Matt decides to reinvent himself when a new girl, Julia (Lauren Woodland), comes to town to visit her grumpy Grandfather, Harry "Old Man" Gibbs (Al Ruscio). Andy is frightened that they will get hit by the comet. Note: This episode marked Joey Lawrence's directorial debut.
33	17	"Stealing Beauty"	Paul Kreppel	Nicole Avril & Sue Kolinsky	February 16, 1997	035/217	2.76
Kristin gets Matt a job at a music store, but his future there looks bleak when the manager collars a shoplifter. Matt later finds out that Kristin stole CDs and stuck them into his backpack. Matt is afraid to tell on her because she could get arrested. In the end, Kristin confesses and Claire pays to bail her out. Joe and Lloyd try their best to keep the bathroom in the shop clean. Guest star: Jonathan Schmock (series co-creator and executive producer) as Chip "The Can-Do Plumber"
34	18	"Art Attack"	Jonathan Schmock	Craig Hoffman	February 23, 1997	036/218	3.18
Lou has some modern art she wants to take to the museum, so Joe helps her carry her work. Fiona Kensington (Holly Gagnier), the daughter of the woman of an art gallery owner, sees the artwork and thinks Joe did it. So he impresses her by doing some last minute art with help from Andy. Also, Matt takes up playing the guitar and wants to write a song. Matt tries to find inspiration by his surroundings. When their garbageman Leo (Chuck E. Weiss) pays a visit, Andy tells him he has got a pigeon on his car, Matt then comes up with a very bad song.
35	19	"Pizza Girl"	Terry Hughes	Jim Vallely	March 30, 1997	017	2.29
Romance is in the air at the pizza parlor as Matt's co-worker Rosa (Sarah Silverman) falls for Joe and Andy falls for a young girl who does not think his jokes are funny. Meanwhile, Lloyd steals a pig from a Chinese restaurant and refuses to return it in fear it will be killed. Guest star: Vincent Guastaferro as Uncle Dom Note: This episode was originally produced for the first season, but its original broadcast was held over until the second season.
36	20	"Easy Come, Easy Go"	Mark Cendrowski	Eddie Gorodetsky	April 20, 1997	034/216	2.40
Andy becomes Joe's good luck charm on a trip to Atlantic City – for a while. Meanwhile, bad luck crashes the scene when Matt throws his first big party. Guest star: Rip Taylor as Himself
37	21	"I Scream, You Scream" (Part 1)	Joey Lawrence	Arthur F. Montmorency	April 27, 1997	038/220	2.63
Joe moves in for the kill after Matt claims he is "just friends" with Kristin. An ice-cream vendor is a real treat for Andy and for Claire. Guest stars: Kevin Meaney as Ken and Karl David-Djerf as Silent Jim
38	22	"We All Scream" (Part 2)	Rich Correll	Story by : David Wolf; Teleplay by : Michael Rowe	May 4, 1997	039/221	2.32
Matt and Joe nearly come to fisticuffs over Kristin, who is unable to handle the truth when she hears it; and Lou receives an e-mail message from an admirer.
39	23	"Mother's Day"	Mark Cendrowski	Craig Hoffman	May 11, 1997	040/222	2.40
Mother's Day brings a surprise visit from Joe's hippie mom, who is pregnant and married to an "aura-photographer". Guest stars: Jane Fleiss as Amber and Tom Kenny as Lucien Note: Tom Kenny previously guest starred as Doug in the season one episode "Remember".
40	24	"Girl Crazy"	Joey Lawrence	Eddie Gorodetsky	May 18, 1997	037/219	2.42
Julia returns hoping to strike up a relationship with Matt again, but his friends are not part of her plans. Meanwhile, Andy "sells his childhood" at a garage sale to earn cash.

== Broadcast ==
The show was first aired on NBC as part of its 1995–96 schedule and then switched to The WB for the beginning of its 1996–97 lineup. The show also aired in syndication on Disney Channel from 1997 until 2001. It has also previously aired on Family Channel in Canada.

== Awards and nominations ==
Year	Award	Category	Recipient	Result
1996	Young Artist Award	Best Performance by a Young Actor	Matthew Lawrence	Nominated
1996	Young Artist Award	Best Performance by a Young Actress – Guest Starring Role	Lisa Rieffel	Nominated
1996	Young Artist Award	Best Performance by an Actor Under Ten	Andrew Lawrence	Nominated
1997	Young Artist Award	Best Performance in a TV Comedy – Leading Young Actor	Andrew Lawrence	Nominated
