= 72 Hours =

72 Hours may refer to:

- 72 Hours: True Crime, Canadian television series
- "72 Hours" (The Killing), an episode of the television series The Killing
- 72 Hours (Golden Girls), an episode of the sitcom The Golden Girls
- 72 Hours (TV series), a 2013 reality television series on TNT
- 72 Hours, a 2015 film starring Timon Kyle Durrett
- 72 Hours: Martyr Who Never Died, a 2019 Indian film
- 72 Hours (2024 film), a film directed by Christian Sesma
- 72 Hours (2026 film), an American comedy film directed by Tim Story
