= Mister Terrific (disambiguation) =

Mister Terrific is the name of two different superheroes in the DC Comics universe:

- Mister Terrific (Terry Sloane)
- Mister Terrific (Michael Holt)

Mister Terrific may also refer to:

- Mr. Terrific (TV series), a 1967 US television sitcom
- "Mister Terrific", a third-season episode of the Golden Girls
