= The Golden Girls season 2 =

The Golden Girls
- Season 2
- DVD cover
- No. of episodes: 26

Release
- Original network: NBC
- Original release: September 27, 1986 – May 16, 1987

Season chronology
- ← Previous; Season 1 Next → Season 3

The second season of The Golden Girls premiered on NBC on September 27, 1986, and concluded on May 16, 1987. The season consisted of 26 episodes.

== Broadcast history ==
The season originally aired Saturdays at 9:00-9:30 pm (EST) on NBC from September 27, 1986, to May 16, 1987.

== Episodes ==
| No. overall | No. in season | Title | Directed by | Written by | Original release date | Prod. code | Rating/share (households) |
|---|---|---|---|---|---|---|---|
| 26 | 1 | "End of the Curse" | Terry Hughes | Susan Harris | September 27, 1986 | 026 | 25.6/45 |
Blanche is depressed when she thinks she is pregnant, but is devastated when she finds out she is beginning menopause. Rose and Dorothy try their hands at mink-breeding with no success. Guest Stars: Philip Sterling as Dr. Barensfeld and Vince Cannon as Dr. Parks Note: Rue McClanahan won an Emmy Award for Outstanding Lead Actress in a Comedy for this episode. Philip Sterling appears in a Season 3 episode as Dr. Ashley
| 27 | 2 | "Ladies of the Evening" | Terry Hughes | Barry Fanaro and Mort Nathan | October 4, 1986 | 027 | 27.3/47 |
Blanche wins three tickets to a premiere of Burt Reynolds's new movie and passes to the after-party, leaving Sophia angry about being left out. The girls decide to make a weekend out of attending the premiere and get arrested when their hotel is raided for prostitution. Sophia then gets revenge by claiming the tickets and passes and going to the premiere alone, leaving the others in jail. However, the story has a happy ending when Burt stops by the house to take Sophia up on a dinner offer and the roommates get to meet him after all. Guest Stars: Peter Jason as The Policeman, Rhonda Aldrich as Meg, Ron Michaelson as Carl, Phil Rubenstein as the exterminator, Tony Swartz as John, Peter Jason as the Policeman, Burt Reynolds as himself
| 28 | 3 | "Take Him, He's Mine" | Terry Hughes | Kathy Speer and Terry Grossman | October 11, 1986 | 028 | 24.6/40 |
Blanche takes Dorothy's ex-husband Stan out as a favor to Dorothy, but when Blanche says they hit it off, Dorothy becomes jealous. Rose and Sophia team up to sell sandwiches and end up threatened by the mob. Guest Stars: Herb Edelman as Stan; Lana Schwab as The Girl; Tom La Grua as Vinnie
| 29 | 4 | "It's a Miserable Life" | Terry Hughes | Barry Fanaro and Mort Nathan | November 1, 1986 | 034 | 25.0/43 |
The girls work on saving a 200-year-old oak tree in their neighborhood and become frustrated when the grouchy neighbor on whose property the tree is located does not object to it being removed and actually encourages it. At a local council meeting, Rose reaches her limit and yells at the woman, who then dies of a heart attack, leaving Rose feeling guilty. Guest Stars: Nan Martin as Frieda Claxton, Thom Sharp as Mr. Pfeiffer Note: Nan Martin would appear in a Season 4 episode.
| 30 | 5 | "Isn't It Romantic?" | Terry Hughes | Jeffrey Duteil | November 8, 1986 | 029 | 27.3/45 |
Dorothy's lesbian friend Jean visits and develops feelings for Rose. Guest Star: Lois Nettleton as Jean Note: Betty White was nominated for an Emmy Award for Outstanding Lead Actress in a Comedy for this episode. Lois Nettleton was nominated for an Emmy Award for Outstanding Guest Performer in a Comedy Series for this episode. Terry Hughes won an Emmy Award for Outstanding Directing for a Comedy Series and a DGA Award for Outstanding Director for a Comedy Series for this episode. Jeffrey Duteil was nominated for an Emmy Award for Outstanding Writing for a Comedy Series for this episode.
| 31 | 6 | "Big Daddy's Little Lady" | David Steinberg | Russell Marcus | November 15, 1986 | 035 | 25.3/42 |
Blanche is thrilled when her father, Big Daddy, announces he is getting married, but quickly changes her attitude when she finds out how young the bride-to-be is. Dorothy and Rose enter a song-writing contest and creative differences almost come between them. Guest Stars: David Wayne as Big Daddy, Sondra Currie as Margaret Spencer
| 32 | 7 | "Family Affair" | Terry Hughes | Winifred Hervey | November 22, 1986 | 036 | 26.8/43 |
When Rose's daughter, Bridget, and Dorothy's musician son, Michael, both visit and sleep together, it prompts a vicious fight between their mothers. Guest Stars: Scott Jacoby as Michael and Marilyn Jones as Bridget
| 33 | 8 | "Vacation" | Terry Hughes | Winifred Hervey | November 29, 1986 | 030 | 25.0/41 |
Dorothy, Rose, and Blanche vacation in the Caribbean, but find the accommodations seriously not to their liking. Back in Miami, Sophia woos the girls' Japanese gardener. Guest Stars: Keye Luke as Toshiro Mitsumo, Tom Villard as Rick, Stephen Lee as Dwayne, Brett Porter as Winston Hardwick III, Stuart Pankin as Jacques DeCourville; Paul Rodriguez Note: Tom Villard appears in a Season 7 episode as Randy.
| 34 | 9 | "Joust Between Friends" | Terry Hughes | Scott Spencer Gordon | December 6, 1986 | 031 | 23.6/39 |
Dorothy takes a job working with Blanche at the museum and things go well until Dorothy starts keeping secrets from Blanche. Guest Stars: Reid Shelton as Mr. Allen and Inky as the Stray Dog
| 35 | 10 | "Love, Rose" | Terry Hughes | Kathy Speer and Terry Grossman | December 13, 1986 | 037 | 23.8/40 |
With Rose feeling lonely, she takes Blanche's advice and places an ad in the local newspaper's personals column. When she gets no response and feels even more depressed, Blanche sends her a response under the name Isaac Q. Newton. Their deception works until Rose invites Isaac to be her date at a formal banquet, and Issac turns out to be a real person who contradicts the imaginary one in every way. Blanche and Dorothy are forced to confess when Rose starts accusing Issac of lying. Meanwhile, Sophia is stalked by an elderly gentleman and ends up going to the banquet with him, only to discover his actions are because he mistakenly believes she is rich. Guest Stars: Paul Dooley as Isaac Q. Newton and Colin Drake as Wilfred Witley Cheswick Note: Paul Dooley appears in a later episode as George Corliss
| 36 | 11 | "'Twas the Nightmare Before Christmas" | Terry Hughes | Barry Fanaro and Mort Nathan | December 20, 1986 | 038 | 23.5/41 |
A series of mishaps almost ruins the girls' Christmas. They plan to fly home to visit their families, but are taken hostage at Rose's office by a lonely man dressed as Santa Claus. Sophia defuses the situation, but their flights are subsequently cancelled due to the weather, and they have to spend Christmas Eve in a roadside diner. Guest stars: Terry Kiser as Santa Claus, Craig Richard Nelson as Thurber, Teddy Willson as Albert, Sam Anderson as Meyer, Buddy Daniels as Airport Mendicant Note: Barry Fanaro and Mort Nathan won the WGA Award for Outstanding Writing for a Comedy Series for this episode.
| 37 | 12 | "The Sisters" | Terry Hughes | Christopher Lloyd | January 3, 1987 | 039 | 27.0/41 |
Dorothy arranges for Sophia's sister, Angela, to fly from Sicily to Miami, as a surprise gift for Sophia's birthday, not realizing that Sophia and Angela have been feuding for decades, over what turns out to be a big misunderstanding. Guest Stars: Nancy Walker as Angela
| 38 | 13 | "The Stan Who Came to Dinner" | Terry Hughes | Kathy Speer and Terry Grossman | January 10, 1987 | 041 | 26.6/41 |
After a major heart surgery, Stan temporarily moves in with the ladies, and quickly overstays his welcome. Guest Stars: Rod Sabbe as Rob, Odil Sabbe as Bob, Steve Kramer as Dr. Stephen Deutsch Note: Beatrice Arthur was nominated for the Emmy Award for Outstanding Lead Actress in a Comedy for this episode. Herb Edelman was nominated for the Emmy Award for Outstanding Guest Performer in a Comedy Series for this episode.
| 39 | 14 | "The Actor" | Terry Hughes | Barry Fanaro and Mort Nathan | January 17, 1987 | 040 | 25.0/40 |
When a handsome actor comes to Miami to star in a play at the local community theater, he dates Blanche, Rose, and Dorothy simultaneously, leading each of them to believe he will marry them. Guest Stars: Lloyd Bochner as Patrick Vaughn, Janet Carroll as Phyllis Hammerow, Frank Birney as the Stage Manager
| 40 | 15 | "Before and After" | Terry Hughes | Bob Rosenfarb | January 24, 1987 | 032 | 26.4/42 |
After suffering an esophageal spasm, Rose decides to "live for the day", upsetting the other girls and eventually moving out. Guest Stars: Deborah May as Liz, Rosanna Huffman as Stephanie, Nat Bernstein as Dr. Wallerstein Note: Nat Bernstein appears in the following episode as Emily's father
| 41 | 16 | "And Then There Was One" | Terry Hughes | Russell Marcus | January 31, 1987 | 042 | 21.8/35 |
The girls volunteer to babysit the children of participants in a local marathon, in which Sophia participates, and become concerned when a baby girl's parents don't come to pick her up after the race. It turns out the girl's mother went into labor and Sophia forgot to give the girls the message. Guest Stars: Christopher Burton as Norman, Nat Bernstein as Emily's father, Ray Combs as Bob Henderson, Ariana Richards as Lisa
| 42 | 17 | "Bedtime Story" | Terry Hughes | Kathy Speer, Terry Grossman, Mort Nathan, and Barry Fanaro | February 7, 1987 | 043 | 24.1/39 |
Trying to decide on sleeping arrangements for visiting relatives, the ladies reminisce about places where they have previously slept, from a train station to Sophia's bed. Guest Stars: Randy Bennett as Stationmaster, and Charles Bouvier as Clown
| 43 | 18 | "Forgive Me, Father" | Terry Hughes | Kathy Speer and Terry Grossman | February 14, 1987 | 045 | 23.7/38 |
Dorothy has her eye on a handsome teacher colleague at the school where she has been working, but doesn't realize he is a priest. He further confuses her when he tells her he is thinking of "leaving the church." Guest Stars: John McMartin as Fr. Frank Leahy, and Barney McGeary as Father Callahan
| 44 | 19 | "Long Day's Journey Into Marinara" | Terry Hughes | Barry Fanaro and Mort Nathan | February 21, 1987 | 046 | 24.5/41 |
When Sophia's sister Angela moves to Miami, Sophia quickly begins to think she wants to take everything she has, including her boyfriend. Meanwhile, Rose, who has been babysitting a friend's piano-playing chicken, is horrified when it appears that Angela has killed the chicken and fried it up for dinner. Guest Stars: Nancy Walker as Angela and Joe Alfasa as Tony Note: Nancy Walker was nominated for an Emmy Award for Outstanding Guest Performer in a Comedy for this episode.
| 45 | 20 | "Whose Face Is This, Anyway?" | Terry Hughes | Winifred Hervey | February 28, 1987 | 044 | 25.8/43 |
After attending her college sorority reunion and seeing that her sorority sisters have had plastic surgery and seeing how old she looks in a video Rose made for community college class, Blanche decides to have an aggressive amount of plastic surgery herself. Guest Stars: Joseph Whipp as Dr. Taylor
| 46 | 21 | "Dorothy's Prized Pupil" | Terry Hughes | Christopher Lloyd | March 14, 1987 | 033 | 23.8/38 |
Dorothy tutors a young Hispanic boy and enters an essay of his in a local contest where it not only wins first prize, but results in the discovery that he is in the country illegally. Dorothy feels at fault and convinces Mario to fight to stay in America. Mario shows up after the hearing to tell Dorothy he is being deported, but will be able to undergo the procedures to legally return, much to Dorothy's relief. Meanwhile, Rose decides that she must become Blanche's personal servant for a week to atone for losing a pair of Blanche's earrings, which it turns out Blanche herself lost. Guest Stars: Mario Lopez as Mario, John Braden as Sam Burns
| 47 | 22 | "Diamond in the Rough" | Terry Hughes | Jan Fischer and William Weidner | March 21, 1987 | 047 | 23.3/39 |
Blanche dates a handsome caterer and shocks the other girls when she refuses to commit to a serious relationship with him. Guest Stars: Donnelly Rhodes as Jake Smollens, Howard Witt as Hunter McCoy
| 48 | 23 | "Son-in-Law Dearest" | Terry Hughes | Patt Shea and Harriet Weiss | April 11, 1987 | 048 | 23.0/38 |
Dorothy's daughter Kate visits (as well as Stan) and reveals that she has left her husband, Dennis, after he cheated on her. Dorothy is even more furious when Kate reconciles with him. Meanwhile, Blanche and Rose watch an I Love Lucy marathon on television. Guest Stars: Deena Freeman as Kate, Jonathan Perpich as Dennis
| 49 | 24 | "To Catch a Neighbor" | Terry Hughes | Russell Marcus | May 2, 1987 | 049 | 19.5/36 |
The girls allow two undercover cops (Joseph Campanella and George Clooney) to use their house as a base for spying on their new neighbors, who are suspected of being jewel thieves. Dorothy develops a crush on the senior detective and Sophia takes advantage of this. In the middle of the night, the neighbors' house is raided as they try to sell the diamonds and they are arrested, but the junior cop is shot in the process, discouraging Dorothy's notions of a relationship. Guest Stars: Joseph Campanella as Al Mullins, George Clooney as Bobby Hopkins, Barbara Tarbuck as Martha McDowell
| 50 | 25 | "A Piece of Cake" | Terry Hughes | Kathy Speer, Terry Grossman, Mort Nathan, and Barry Fanaro | May 9, 1987 | 050 | 19.2/37 |
The ladies recall other birthday celebrations while preparing a surprise birthday party for a friend. Dorothy recalls Rose taking her to a children's restaurant, Rose recalls her first birthday following her husband's death, Sophia recalls her 50th birthday in 1955, when she fought with her husband as he pointed out an error on her birth certificate that made her think she was 48, forcing Dorothy to defuse the situation, and Blanche recalls her first birthday after the girls started living together, when she used to hate celebrating her birthday until the others throw her a surprise party with all the men from her address book. It turns out the party in the present is for Blanche as well, and the women celebrate by joining a conga line made up of the men from Blanche's past party. Guest Stars: Lynnie Greene (credited as Lyn Greene) as Younger Dorothy, Alan Blumenfeld as Mr. Ha Ha, Jeffrey Weber as Bobby Spina, Sid Melton as voice of Salvadore Petrillo Note: Alan Blumenfeld appeared in an earlier episode as Lou. The writers of this episode were nominated for a WGA Award for Outstanding Writing for a Comedy Series for this episode.
| 51 | 26 | "Empty Nests" | Jay Sandrich | Susan Harris | May 16, 1987 | 051 | 17.8/34 |
The girls' neighbor Renee feels lonely because her doctor husband, George, works constantly and their children have moved out. Guest Stars: Rita Moreno as Renee Corliss, Paul Dooley as Dr. George Corliss, David Leisure as Oliver, Jane Harnick as Jenny Corliss, and Geoffrey Lewis as Chuck/Mr. Fix-It Note: This episode was a backdoor pilot for the spinoff series Empty Nest, although the concept was retooled and recast before the series actually went to air.

== Awards and nominations ==
39th Primetime Emmy Awards

- Award for Outstanding Comedy Series
- Nomination for Outstanding Lead Actress in a Comedy Series (Beatrice Arthur) (Episode: "The Stan Who Came to Dinner")
- Award for Outstanding Lead Actress in a Comedy Series (Rue McClanahan) (Episode: "End of the Curse")
- Nomination for Outstanding Lead Actress in a Comedy Series (Betty White) (Episode: "Isn't It Romantic?")
- Nomination for Outstanding Supporting Actress in a Comedy Series (Estelle Getty)
- Nomination for Outstanding Guest Performer in a Comedy Series (Herb Edelman) (Episode: "The Stan Who Came to Dinner")
- Nomination for Outstanding Guest Performer in a Comedy Series (Lois Nettleton) (Episode: "Isn't It Romantic?")
- Nomination for Outstanding Guest Performer in a Comedy Series (Nancy Walker) (Episode: "A Long Days Journey Into Marinara")
- Award for Outstanding Directing for a Comedy Series (Terry Hughes) (Episode: "Isn't It Romantic?")
- Nomination for Outstanding Writing for a Comedy Series (Jeffrey Duteil) (Episode: "Isn't It Romantic?")

44th Golden Globe Awards

- Award for Best Comedy Series
- Nomination for Best Actress in a Comedy Series (Beatrice Arthur)
- Nomination for Best Actress in a Comedy Series (Estelle Getty)
- Nomination for Best Actress in a Comedy Series (Rue McClanahan)
- Nomination for Best Actress in a Comedy Series (Betty White)

Writers Guild of America Awards

- Award for Outstanding Writing for a Comedy Series (Barry Fanaro, Mort Nathan) (Episode: "'Twas the Nightmare Before Christmas")
- Nomination for Outstanding Writing for a Comedy Series (Kathy Speer, Terry Grossman, Barry Fanaro, Mort Nathan) (Episode: "A Piece of Cake")

Directors Guild of America Awards

- Award for Outstanding Directing for a Comedy Series (Terry Hughes) (Episode: "Isn't It Romantic?")

== Home media ==
The Region 1, 2 and 4 DVDs were respectively released on May 17, August 1 and September 21, 2005.
