= The Golden Girls season 3 =

The Golden Girls
- Season 3
- DVD cover
- No. of episodes: 25

Release
- Original network: NBC
- Original release: September 19, 1987 – May 7, 1988

Season chronology
- ← Previous; Season 2 Next → Season 4

The third season of The Golden Girls premiered on NBC on September 19, 1987, and concluded on May 7, 1988. The season consisted of 25 episodes.

== Broadcast history ==
The season originally aired Saturdays at 9:00–9:30 pm (EST) from September 19, 1987, to May 7, 1988.

== Episodes ==
No. overall	No. in season	Title	Directed by	Written by	Original release date	Prod. code	Rating/share (households)
52	1	"Old Friends"	Terry Hughes	Kathy Speer and Terry Grossman	September 19, 1987	055	23.0/41
At a beach, Sophia meets an elderly widower named Alvin. The two become friends and enjoy spending time together on a bench at the beach. However, as the friendship deepens, the old fellow's behavior becomes erratic, and she learns he has Alzheimer's disease. At home, Blanche accidentally gives away Rose's cherished teddy bear to a little girl named Daisy, who is a Sunshine Cadet. When Blanche tries to get the bear back for Rose, the girl holds the teddy for ransom. Guest stars: Joe Seneca as Alvin Newcastle; Jenny Lewis as Daisy. Note: Estelle Getty won a Primetime Emmy Award for Outstanding Supporting Actress in a Comedy Series for this episode. This episode also won an Emmy Award for Outstanding Technical Direction/Electronic Camerawork/Video Control for a Series, and Terry Hughes was nominated for the Outstanding Directing for a Comedy Series category. Hughes was also nominated for the same category at the DGA Awards, and Kathy Speer and Terry Grossman were nominated for Outstanding Writing for a Comedy Series at the WGA Awards.
53	2	"One for the Money"	Terry Hughes	Kathy Speer, Terry Grossman, Barry Fanaro, Mort Nathan, and Winifred Hervey Stallworth	September 26, 1987	057	22.3/40
The ladies recall their attempts to earn extra money, including starting a catering business. Guest stars: Sid Melton as Salvadore Petrillo; Lynnie Greene as young Dorothy Zbornak; Roy Stuart as Marty; Conrad Janis as dance announcer.
54	3	"Bringing Up Baby"	Terry Hughes	Barry Fanaro and Mort Nathan	October 3, 1987	052	24.4/44
When Rose's uncle dies, she learns that she will be inheriting a baby that she must raise. A man, on behalf of Rose’s uncle, brings the baby to the ladies' house. They are surprised to learn that Baby is actually the name of an elderly male pig that used to roam on the uncle's farm. Blanche and Dorothy initially decline to take care of it until they learn that they will earn $100,000 upon Baby's death, which they can then split among themselves. Baby becomes ill, and Rose eventually learns from a veterinarian that Baby is homesick for the farm. Dorothy and Blanche persuade Rose to keep Baby with them, stating that the plane ride back home could kill him. Dorothy begins feeling guilty about keeping Baby away from the farm, and Blanche eventually realizes that the pig really is homesick. Baby is sent home, and Rose later receives a letter informing her of Baby's death on the farm shortly after arriving. Meanwhile, Sophia drops her eyeglasses at the mall and they break, leaving her to stumble around blind and almost get hit by a car. Guest star: Parley Baer as Chester T. Raney. Note: Betty White was nominated for an Emmy Award for Outstanding Lead Actress in a Comedy Series for this episode.
55	4	"The Housekeeper"	Terry Hughes	Winifred Hervey Stallworth	October 17, 1987	058	20.3/36
While Sophia is away on vacation, the ladies hire a housekeeper, Marguerite, who charms them but is lousy at keeping the house clean. When they fire her, she storms out, telling the ladies they have made a big mistake. At first, the ladies think nothing of it until they all receive terrible luck and become convinced that Marguerite has placed a voodoo curse on them. They rehire Marguerite and behave very nicely towards her, giving her champagne, flowers, and a tiara. Sophia returns home, and Dorothy explains to her why Marguerite is receiving such special treatment. Sophia questions Marguerite about the alleged curse, despite Dorothy's pleas not to do so. Marguerite denies placing a curse on the ladies, and although she appreciates being rehired, she declines the offer. Guest star: Paula Kelly as Marguerite Brown.
56	5	"Nothing to Fear But Fear Itself"	Terry Hughes	Christopher Lloyd	October 24, 1987	056	24.2/43
When Rose's great-aunt dies, she must fly to the Bahamas to deliver the eulogy — and speaking in public is her greatest fear. She persuades Blanche and Dorothy to come along, where they end up facing their own fears onboard the plane. Dorothy has a fear of flying, while Blanche faces a nightmare that seems to be coming true: being on an airplane, full of bald men, that ultimately crashes. After encountering a storm, the plane is forced to turn around, unlike in Blanche's dream. Dorothy and Blanche convince Rose to deliver the eulogy to the plane occupants. At home, Sophia enters a cook-off for the Daughters of Sicily, Italy. Guest star: Meg Wyllie as Candy the stewardess; Paul Ross as Captain Lord (voice). Note: This was the first of four appearances by Meg Wylie.
57	6	"Letter to Gorbachev"	Terry Hughes	Barry Fanaro and Mort Nathan	October 31, 1987	060	18.9/34
Mikhail Gorbachev's U.S. representatives report that their leader was touched by Rose's letter pleading for nuclear disarmament and that he is eager to meet Rose — who, they all assume, must be a little girl, given her letter's naivete. As Blanche and Dorothy ponder how to break the news to Rose, Sophia tries to devise the perfect act for a talent show. Guest star: Allan Rich as Alexi. Note: Newscaster Edwin Newman appears as himself (uncredited).
58	7	"Strange Bedfellows"	Terry Hughes	Christopher Lloyd	November 7, 1987	054	23.1/41
Gil Kessler, a political candidate for whom the ladies are campaigning, tries to beef up his image by publicly claiming to have had an affair with Blanche. Blanche protests her innocence, but Rose and Dorothy do not believe her and end up not speaking to her. During a press conference, Gil finally comes clean, while also informing the public that he used to be a woman, which Sophia claims she always knew. At home, Dorothy and Rose apologize to Blanche, and the women reconcile. Guest star: John Schuck as Gil Kessler. Note: Rue McClanahan was nominated for an Emmy Award for Outstanding Lead Actress in a Comedy Series for this episode.
59	8	"Brotherly Love"	Terry Hughes	Jeffrey Ferro and Fredric Weiss	November 14, 1987	061	22.2/39
Stan's younger brother Ted, an attractive doctor, comes to town, and after dating Blanche, he ends up sleeping with Dorothy. Stan becomes convinced that Ted is going to ask Dorothy to marry him and tries to talk him out of it. However, it turns out that Ted has met a much younger woman and considers Dorothy a one-night stand. Dorothy gets revenge by informing everyone that Ted is impotent. Meanwhile, Rose is dealing with a severe run of insomnia, which it turns out is caused by drinking caffeine-loaded tea. Guest star: McLean Stevenson as Dr. Theodore "Ted" Zbornak.
60	9	"A Visit from Little Sven"	Terry Hughes	David Nichols	November 21, 1987	059	21.7/33
Rose's young, clueless cousin Sven arrives from Sweden on his way to St. Olaf, Minnesota, United States, to meet his bride-to-be. Blanche uses him to make her cheating boyfriend jealous, causing Sven to fall in love with her. Meanwhile, Sophia is taking driving lessons from Dorothy in order to renew her license, but after one trip, Dorothy refuses to get into a car with her again. At Rose's insistence, Blanche tries to defuse Sven's crush on her, but on meeting his bride, the young and beautiful Olga, he quickly ditches Blanche. Guest stars: Casey Sander as Sven; Chuck Walling as Floyd McCallum; Yvette Heyden as Olga.
61	10	"The Audit"	Terry Hughes	Winifred Hervey Stallworth	November 28, 1987	053	22.9/39
Dorothy and Stan are audited by the IRS, and they may be in deep trouble due to Stan's extravagant spending. Meanwhile, Rose takes a Spanish class at night school to qualify for a promotion at work, and Blanche tags along because she figures that it will be a good way to meet smart men. Stan and Dorothy are told they have to pay up $2,500 each, which makes Dorothy furious. She cannot raise the money, so she sells her diamond ring. Stan sells his Corvette and buys back the ring for her, and they settle their bill, with Dorothy seeing a different (and better) side of Stan she never knew before. Guest stars: Tony Perez as Mr. Escobar; Richard Penn as Mr. Murray. Note: Herb Edelman was nominated for an Emmy Award for Outstanding Guest Performer in a Comedy Series for this episode.
62	11	"Three on a Couch"	Terry Hughes	Jeffrey Ferro and Fredric Weiss	December 5, 1987	064	23.7/41
Constant bickering leads the ladies to seek professional counseling from a psychiatrist. Guest stars: Philip Sterling as Dr. Ashley; Terry Wills as Carl; John C. Moskoff as Jerry. Note: Philip Sterling appeared in a season 2 episode also as a therapist, Dr. Barensfeld.
63	12	"Charlie's Buddy"	Terry Hughes	Kathy Speer and Terry Grossman	December 12, 1987	062	21.0/37
A visitor announces he is an army buddy of Charlie, Rose's late husband. The two hit it off to the point that Rose considers moving away with him, but Dorothy is suspicious. Guest star: Milo O'Shea as Buddy Rourke. The first scene is introduced with music that is typically played between scenes in the middle of the show, instead of the typical music played in the opening scene.
64	13	"The Artist"	Terry Hughes	Christopher Lloyd	December 19, 1987	065	22.0/40
Suave, sexy artist Laszlo chooses Blanche as his nude model for a sculpture. When Blanche sneaks a peek at Laszlo's sketches, she is indignant: the pictures resemble Rose. Dorothy soon reveals that Laszlo asked her to pose, too, and the three bicker over which of them will be immortalized in stone. Guest stars: Tony Jay as Laszlo; Monte Landis as Victor.
65	14	"Blanche's Little Girl"	Terry Hughes	Kathy Speer and Terry Grossman	January 9, 1988	067	23.8/36
Blanche wants to defend her overweight daughter, whose boyfriend speaks to her abusively, but she is afraid that if she does, her daughter will resent her interference and they will again be estranged. Meanwhile, Sophia, now working at a fast-food restaurant, organizes a strike against her tyrannical boss: a pre-teen boy. Guest stars: Shawn Schepps as Rebecca Devereaux; Joe Regalbuto as Jeremy, Scott Menville as McCracken; Meg Wyllie as Edna. Note: The character of Rebecca would reappear in Seasons 5 and 6 played by Debra Engle.
66	15	"Dorothy's New Friend"	Terry Hughes	Robert Bruce and Martin Weiss	January 16, 1988	066	23.8/39
Dorothy enjoys the intellectual stimulation of her friendship with new pal Barbara Thorndyke, a novelist, but Barbara's superior air and snobby ways rub Blanche and Rose the wrong way. Guest star: Bonnie Bartlett as Barbara Thorndyke.
67	16	"Grab That Dough"	Terry Hughes	Winifred Hervey Stallworth	January 23, 1988	063	21.9/36
The girls visit Hollywood, California, to be on the game show Grab that Dough. They are forced to travel cross-country the day before the show, and from there, everything goes wrong: the airline loses their luggage; their hotel has no vacant rooms and they are forced to sleep in the lobby; their purses are stolen; and when they finally get to the television station for the taping, Dorothy and Blanche end up pitting themselves against Rose and Sophia. Guest stars: Jim McKrell as Guy Corbin; Lucy Lee Flippin as Nancy.
68	17	"My Brother, My Father"	Terry Hughes	Barry Fanaro and Mort Nathan	February 6, 1988	068	24.6/39
While Rose and Blanche rehearse for their roles in The Sound of Music, Sophia has a request for Dorothy: pretend to still be married to Stan for Angelo, her priest brother, who will be visiting. Guest stars: Herb Edelman as Stan Zbornak; Bill Dana as Uncle Angelo. Note: Bea Arthur won an Emmy Award for Outstanding Lead Actress in a Comedy Series for this episode.
69	18	"Golden Moments"	Terry Hughes	Story by : Kathy Speer and Terry Grossman; Teleplay by : Mort Nathan and Barry Fanaro	February 13, 1988	069	24.4/40
70	19	"Golden Moments"	Terry Hughes	Story by : Kathy Speer and Terry Grossman; Teleplay by : Mort Nathan and Barry Fanaro	February 13, 1988	070	24.4/40
Sophia intends to move to New Jersey to live with her eccentric son, Phil, after his wife leaves him. This prompts the girls to recall the years that they have spent together. In the end, though, Phil's wife returns and they reconcile, so Sophia stays with the girls. Note: One-hour clip show.
71	20	"And Ma Makes Three"	Terry Hughes	Winifred Hervey Stallworth	February 20, 1988	071	18.0/28
With all her friends either dying or moving away, Sophia becomes the "third wheel" in Dorothy's latest relationship, and acts as a chaperone on their dates. Guest stars: James Karen as Raymond, Steven M. Porter as waiter; Marte Boyle Slout as Charlotte; Frank Smith as Duncan.
72	21	"Larceny and Old Lace"	Terry Hughes	Story by : Jeffrey Ferro and Fredric Weiss; Teleplay by : Robert Bruce and Martin Weiss	February 27, 1988	072	18.2/28
Sophia's latest boyfriend, Rocco, claims to have been a mobster, so when the girls discover a bag of Rocco's with thousands of dollars in it, they assume he robbed a bank. Meanwhile, Dorothy and Blanche sneak a peek at Rose's diary and discover what appear to be insulting things Rose has written about them. Guest star: Mickey Rooney as Rocco.
73	22	"Rose's Big Adventure"	Terry Hughes	Jeff Abugov	March 12, 1988	075	21.4/36
Rose's newly-retired beau plans a cruise around the world — with Rose as his first mate. Meanwhile, the girls deal with remodeling the garage into a guest room. Guest stars: George Coe as Al, Vito Scotti as Vincenzo; Don Woodard as Ernie. Note: Vito Scotti would appear in a season 4 episode as Dominic Bosco.
74	23	"Mixed Blessings"	Terry Hughes	Christopher Lloyd	March 19, 1988	073	22.5/38
Dorothy's son Michael plans to wed his older, African-American bandmate, Lorraine; they are 23 and 44, respectively. Dorothy complains of the age difference; Lorraine's mother and aunts also disapprove, but mainly because Michael is white. The families agree to try to stop the wedding, only to learn the couple has eloped; upon the revelation that Lorraine is pregnant, the mothers agree they must pretend to be happy. Rose and Blanche try to beautify themselves for a romantic cruise with twin brothers. Guest stars: Scott Jacoby as Michael Zbornak; Rosalind Cash as Lorraine; Virginia Capers as Greta; Lynn Hamilton as Trudy; Montrose Hagins as Libby; Hartley Silver as Justice of the Peace.
75	24	"Mister Terrific"	Terry Hughes	Kathy Speer and Terry Grossman	April 30, 1988	074	20.5/37
Rose starts dating television superhero "Mister Terrific" who is the star of Mister Terrific's Clubhouse. He gets Dorothy a job on his show, but Dorothy's recommendations to the producer Hastings get Mister Terrific fired. This causes Rose to become upset at Dorothy, who feels terrible for putting herself first. Dorothy tries to get Mister Terrific back on the show, but ends up as his replacement as temporary host Miss Schoolteacher. Meanwhile, Blanche orders a new bed, and despite receiving the wrong one, she likes it so much she doesn't say anything, causing her to fear the police are coming after her. Guest stars: Bob Dishy as Mr. Terrific; Lonny Price as Hastings; Jody Price as Jody; Don Woodard as Kolak; John Wheeler as patron; Jim Hudson as Freddy; Raf Mauro as bartender; Ron Kapra as stage manager.
76	25	"Mother's Day"	Terry Hughes	Story by : Kathy Speer and Terry Grossman; Teleplay by : Barry Fanaro and Mort Nathan	May 7, 1988	076	21.2/40
Waiting for their children to call, the girls reminisce about previous Mother's Days: Dorothy remembers asking Stan's mother for money; Sophia remembers an incident involving her mother, played by Bea Arthur; Rose reminisces about a motherly lady she once met at a bus station, whose biological daughter died many years earlier; and Blanche remembers the last Mother's Day she spent with her mother. Guest stars: Geraldine Fitzgerald as Anna (the lady at the bus station); Alice Ghostley as Mrs. Zbornak; Sid Melton as Salvadore Petrillo; Lynnie Greene as young Dorothy Zbornak; Helen Kleeb as Elizabeth Hollingsworth; Wesley Mann as Jacob; Terrence Evans as police officer. Note: Geraldine Fitzgerald also appears in the Season 5 episode, "Not Another Monday" in the role of Sophia's friend Martha Lamont. Geraldine Fitzgerald was nominated for an Emmy Award for Outstanding Guest Performer in a Comedy Series for this episode.

== Awards and nominations ==
40th Primetime Emmy Awards

- Nomination for Outstanding Comedy Series
- Award for Outstanding Lead Actress in a Comedy Series (Beatrice Arthur) (Episode: "My Brother, My Father")
- Nomination for Outstanding Lead Actress in a Comedy Series (Rue McClanahan) (Episode: "Strange Bedfellows")
- Nomination for Outstanding Lead Actress in a Comedy Series (Betty White) (Episode: "Bringing Up Baby")
- Award for Outstanding Supporting Actress in a Comedy Series (Estelle Getty) (Episode: "Old Friends")
- Nomination for Outstanding Guest Performer in a Comedy Series (Herb Edelman) (Episode: "The Audit")
- Nomination for Outstanding Guest Performer in a Comedy Series (Geraldine Fitzgerald) (Episode: "Mother's Day")
- Nomination for Outstanding Directing for a Comedy Series (Terry Hughes) (Episode: "Old Friends")

45th Golden Globe Awards

- Award for Best Comedy Series
- Nomination for Best Actress in a Comedy Series (Beatrice Arthur)
- Nomination for Best Actress in a Comedy Series (Rue McClanahan)
- Nomination for Best Actress in a Comedy Series (Betty White)

Writers Guild of America Awards

- Nomination for Outstanding Writing for a Comedy Series (Kathy Speer & Terry Grossman) (Episode: "Old Friends")

Directors Guild of America Awards

- Nomination for Outstanding Directing for a Comedy Series (Terry Hughes) (Episode: "Old Friends")

== DVD release ==
The Region 1 DVD was released on November 22, 2005. The Region 2 and 4 DVDs were respectively released on January 9 and January 11, 2006.
