= Lloyd Bochner =

Canadian actor (1924–2005)

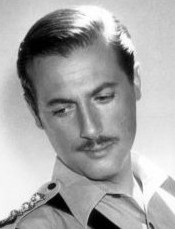
- Bochner as Chief Inspector Neil Campbell in Hong Kong (1961)
- Born: Lloyd Wolfe Bochner; July 29, 1924; Toronto, Ontario, Canada
- Died: October 29, 2005 (aged 81); Santa Monica, California, U.S.
- Resting place: Westwood Village Memorial Park Cemetery in Los Angeles, California
- Occupation: Actor
- Years active: 1946–2003
- Spouse: Ruth Roher Bochner (m. 1948)
- Children: 3, including Hart Bochner
- Awards: ACTRA Awards (2004)

Lloyd Wolfe Bochner (July 29, 1924 – October 29, 2005) was a Canadian actor. He appeared in many Canadian and Hollywood productions between the 1950s and 1990s, including the films Point Blank (1967), The Detective (1968), The Young Runaways (1968), Ulzana's Raid (1972) and Satan's School for Girls (1973), and the television prime time soap opera Dynasty (1981–82). Bochner also voiced Mayor Hamilton Hill in Batman: The Animated Series (1992–95) and its follow-up The New Batman Adventures (1997–99).

== Career ==
At the age of 11, Bochner began his acting career on Ontario radio programs. He went on to garner two Liberty Awards, the highest acting honour in Canada, for his work in Canadian film and theatre. Bochner served in the Royal Canadian Navy during World War II. As a University College student at the University of Toronto, he actively participated in Hart House Theatre. In 1946, he made his debut with The Mapleville Story.

In 1951 he appeared in early television series such as One Man's Family and Kraft Television Theatre. In 1960, ABC called with a starring role in the series Hong Kong with co-star Rod Taylor. Faced against NBC's Wagon Train, then one of the most highly rated programs on the air, Hong Kong ended with the 26th episode. In 1961, he guest-starred in The Americans, an American Civil War drama about how the conflict divided families, starring Darryl Hickman.

A few years later, Bochner appeared in one of his most famous roles, that of a cryptographer attempting to decipher an alien text in the classic 1962 Twilight Zone episode "To Serve Man", a part he spoofed years later in the comedy The Naked Gun 2½: The Smell of Fear. In 1962 and 1963, he appeared in two episodes of the CBS anthology series, GE True, hosted by Jack Webb; he portrayed the part of Stoughton in "Code Name: Christopher, Part I" and Captain Ian Stuart in "Commando".

From 1963 to 1964, Bochner was a member of the repertory cast of NBC's The Richard Boone Show. In 1964, he guest-starred in the Voyage to the Bottom of the Sea season-one episode "The Fear-Makers". Later that year, he appeared as murderer Eric Pollard in the Perry Mason episode, "The Case of the Latent Lover". In 1965, he guest-starred on ABC's Western series The Legend of Jesse James starring Christopher Jones in the title role. Two years later, he appeared on the ABC military-Western Custer starring Wayne Maunder in the title role. He appeared twice on the long-running television Western The Virginian in the 1960s. Bochner is also memorably smooth and malicious as the gangster Carter against Lee Marvin in John Boorman's seminal 1960s film noir Point Blank. In 1971, Bochner appeared as Abel Wilks in "The Men From Shiloh" (rebranded name for The Virginian) in the episode titled "The Town Killer."

Over the years, Bochner continued to portray a variety of roles in television and film, from a warlock on Bewitched to a homosexual doctor coming out at middle age in the 1977 television movie Terraces to Pia Zadora's abusive screenwriter husband in the camp classic film The Lonely Lady. In 1960, he starred in an adaptation of A. J. Cronin's The Citadel along with Ann Blyth. His son Paul said he "almost always played a suave, handsome, wealthy villain."

=== Notable roles ===
Bochner played the scheming Cecil Colby on Dynasty. The character suffered a heart attack while having sex with Alexis Carrington (Joan Collins), and later died in his hospital bed seconds after marrying her. A few years later, Bochner planned to star as C.C. Capwell on the daytime drama Santa Barbara, but a heart attack caused his departure from the series. Bochner continued to appear in television series for the next few decades, doing frequent voiceover work for the highly acclaimed animated series Batman: The Animated Series and The New Batman Adventures. He joined the Stratford Festival of Canada in its first season in 1953 and spent six years there, playing Horatio in Hamlet, Orsino in Twelfth Night, and Duke Vincentio in Measure for Measure opposite James Mason.

=== Television roles ===
In 1962, Bochner played in The Twilight Zone episode, "To Serve Man." In 1965, he guest starred on Combat! in the fourth season episode "Evasion" as Major Thorne. In 1966 on The Wild Wild West he played Zachariah Skull, an ingenious murderer, in "The Night of the Puppeteer." In 1966, Bochner played the author Robert Louis Stevenson in the episode "Jolly Roger and Wells Fargo" of Death Valley Days. That same year he appeared in 12 O'Clock High, playing the British officer, Major Mallory, episode "Fortress Wiesbaden".

In 1967, he appeared as a Royal Air Force officer and his German double on an episode of Hogan's Heroes in the episode "A Funny Thing Happened On the Way To London". In 1967, he played an 'U.N.C.L.E.' agent in the last season of The Man From U.N.C.L.E.; a unique role in that while he was a 'good guy' in the final dialogue he was described as being "reassuringly unlikeable". He also appeared three times on the TV series Mission: Impossible. 1969 "The Glass Cage", 1971 "Takeover" and 1972 "The Deal". In 1969, Bochner played a handsome warlock named Franklyn in the Bewitched season five episode, "Marriage Witches Style". In 1969, he played as the cat-loving bad guy Clayton Hewitt in the episode "Catspaw" on It Takes a Thief and the final episode of same, "Project X", as Dr. George Kingsford in 1970.

In 1970, Bochner played Walter Gregson, a strangler on Hawaii Five-O in the season three episode, "Beautiful Screamer". Later on Hawaii Five-O, he was the Navy captain in the 1975 episode, "Murder: Eyes Only". He also appeared in Hawaii Five-O season 12 in an episode called "Clash of the Shadows" as a Jewish diplomat. He appeared in the episode "Prosecutor" of the ABC crime drama The Silent Force in 1970. In 1973, he played a chess coach in Columbo: The Most Dangerous Match and was in the episode "The Pisces" of the short-lived TV show The Starlost. In 1974 he guest starred as a would-be assassin in the TV series Chopper One in the episode "Killing Time" along with series regular Dirk Benedict with whom he would later work in Battlestar Galactica.

In 1974 and 1977, he appeared in four episodes of The Six Million Dollar Man; he portrayed Gavern Wilson in "Day of the Robot", Ulrich Rau in "Carnival of Spies", and Gordon Shanks in Deadly Countdown (part 1 and 2). In 1977, he was in an episode of the ABC crime drama The Feather and Father Gang and an episode of the ABC situation comedy The San Pedro Beach Bums. Bochner also appeared in Barnaby Jones in an episode titled "The Loose Connection" (broadcast March 18, 1973). He was Commandant Leiter in the Battlestar Galactica original-series episode "Greetings from Earth" (1978).

In the 1980s, Bochner was in two episodes of The Golden Girls — as suave television-turned-stage actor (and womanizer) Patrick Vaughn in the season 2 episode "The Actor" in 1987; and as Eduardo the Hairdresser two years later in the season 4 episode "Rites of Spring" (1989).

== Personal life and death ==
Bochner was born in Toronto, Ontario, to a middle-class Jewish family, the son of Frieda (née Kenen) and Charles Abraham Bochner. He was of Russian Jewish and Ukrainian Jewish descent. His uncle was Isaiah L. Kenen, founder of the American Zionist Committee for Public Affairs.

Bochner interrupted his undergraduate studies in 1943 to serve in the Navy:

"He was appointed as an Ordinary Seaman (Officer Candidate UNTD) RCNVR in 1943. In 1943 he served in HMCS York for UNTD. He served in HMCS Cornwallis for Training 1944. He was appointed as a Probationary Sub-Lieutenant (Temp.) RCNVR 1944."

After the war, Bochner returned to the University of Toronto, graduating with a Bachelor of Arts in Sociology in 1947 from University College. Bochner married concert pianist Ruth Roher (1925–2017), in 1948. They settled in Toronto, spending several summers in Stratford in the early 1950s, as Bochner acted with the Stratford Festival. In 1960, the family moved to Los Angeles.

In 1998, he co-founded the committee to End Violence, a panel designed to study the impact violent images had on culture. He was also active in the Association of Canadian Radio and Television Artists and was a licensed amateur radio operator.

In his later years, Bochner spent summers sailing his 42-foot sloop in the Georgia Strait, off the coast of British Columbia with his wife Ruth, "indulging their long-held joy in being alone together on the water."

Bochner remained married to Ruth until his death. He died from cancer on October 29, 2005, at the age of 81 at home in Santa Monica, California. Bochner and Ruth had three children — Johanna, Hart Bochner (actor, who also provided voices for Batman), and Paul (director and animator).

== Filmography ==
=== Film ===
Year	Title	Role	Notes
1963	Drums of Africa	David Moore	
1964	The Night Walker	The Dream	
1965	Sylvia	Bruce Stamford III	
1965	Harlow	Marc Peters	
1967	Point Blank	Frederick Carter	
1967	Tony Rome	Vic Rood	
1968	The Detective	Dr. Roberts	
1968	The Young Runaways	Raymond Allen	
1968	The Horse in the Gray Flannel Suit	Archer Madison	
1970	Tiger by the Tail	Del Ware	
1970	The Dunwich Horror	Dr. Cory	
1972	Ulzana's Raid	Captain Gates	
1975	The Man in the Glass Booth	Dr. Churchill	
1975	It Seemed Like a Good Idea at the Time	Burton	
1978	Mr. No Legs	D'Angelo	
1981	The Hot Touch	Severo	
1983	The Lonely Lady	Walter Thornton	
1986	Fine Gold	Don Pedro	
1989	Millennium	Walters	
1991	The Naked Gun 2½: The Smell of Fear	Terence Baggett	
1992	Landslide	"Bull" Matterson	
1993	Morning Glory	Bob Collins	
1998	Bram Stoker's Legend of the Mummy	Abel Trelawny	
2003	The Commission	John J. McCloy	

=== Television ===
Year	Title	Role	Notes
1950–1952	Studio One	Edgar Linton / Prescott / Magi	3 episodes
1951	Lux Video Theatre	Soldier	Episode: "A Child is Born"
1951–1952	Kraft Mystery Theatre	Various	4 episodes
1961	Thriller	Professor Harry Langdon / Count Cagliostro	Episode: “The Prisoner In The Mirror”
1962	The Twilight Zone	Mr. Chambers	Episode: "To Serve Man"
1964	Voyage to the Bottom of the Sea	Martin Davis	Episode: "The Fear-Makers"
1964	Perry Mason	Eric Pollard	Episode: "The Case of the Latent Lover"
1965	Honey West	Guy Patterson	Episode: "The Owl and the Eye"
1965	Kraft Suspense Theatre	Wolfe Hastings	Episode: "The Trains of Silence"
1965	Voyage to the Bottom of the Sea	General Hobson	Episode: "The Deadliest Game"
1966	Bewitched	Franklyn Blodgett	Episode: "Marriage Witch's Style"
1966	The Green Hornet	Dan Carley	Episode: "The Silent Gun"
1966	The Wild Wild West	Zachariah Skull	Episode: "The Night of the Puppeteer"
1967	Sail to Glory	James Cox Stevens	Television film
1967	Hogan's Heroes	Captain Roberts and Lieutenant Baumann	Episode: "A Funny Thing Happened On The Way To London"
1967	Stranger on the Run	Mr. Gorman	Television film
1970	Crowhaven Farm	Kevin Pierce	Television film
1969–1972	Mission: Impossible	Maj. Nicholas Zelinko, Mayor Steve Tallman, General Oliver Hammond	3 Episodes
1971	The Megantic Outlaw	Inspector Carpenter	Television film
1972	Emergency!	Dr. Larry Sunderlin	Episode: "Decision"/"Problem"
1973	Columbo: The Most Dangerous Match	Mazoor Berozski	Television film
1973	Mannix	Burt Sands	Episode: "To Quote a Dead Man"
1973	Satan's School for Girls	Professor Delacroix	Television film
1973	The Starlost	Colonel M. P. Garroway	Episode "The Pisces"
1974	Chopper One	Pike	Episode "Killing Time"
1978	The Immigrants	Chris Noel	Television film
1978	A Fire in the Sky	Paul Gilliam	Television film
1979	Battlestar Galactica	Commandant Leiter	2 episodes
1979	Riel	Dr. Schultz	Television film
1981–1982	Dynasty	Cecil Colby	27 episodes
1982	Mazes and Monsters	Hall	Television film
1982-1987	The Love Boat	Larry Ellis/George Tillman	2 episodes
1986–1992	Murder, She Wrote	Dr. Terence Mayhew/Jason Richards/John Thurston	3 episodes
1987–1989	The Golden Girls	Patrick Vaughn/Eduardo	2 episodes
1990	Road to Avonlea	Mr. Cameron	Episode: "Old Lady Lloyd"
1992–1994	Batman: The Animated Series	Hamilton Hill	Voice, 11 episodes
1997	The New Batman Adventures	Hamilton Hill	Voice, 2 episodes
1998	Loyal Opposition: Terror in the White House	President Mark Hayden	Television film

== Awards ==
Bochner received an ACTRA Award in 2004.
