= The Golden Girls season 4 =

The Golden Girls
- Season 4
- DVD cover
- No. of episodes: 26

Release
- Original network: NBC
- Original release: October 8, 1988 – May 13, 1989

Season chronology
- ← Previous; Season 3 Next → Season 5

The fourth season of The Golden Girls premiered on NBC on October 8, 1988, and concluded on May 13, 1989. The season consisted of 26 episodes.

== Broadcast history ==
The season originally aired Saturdays at 9:00-9:30 pm (EST) on NBC from October 8, 1988, to May 13, 1989.

== Episodes ==
| No. overall | No. in season | Title | Directed by | Written by | Original release date | Prod. code | U.S. viewers (millions) |
|---|---|---|---|---|---|---|---|
| 77 | 1 | "Yes, We Have No Havanas" | Terry Hughes | Mort Nathan and Barry Fanaro | October 8, 1988 | 078 | 32.6 |
Blanche dates an older man named Fidel Santiago (Henry Darrow), but gets a surprise when he starts seeing Sophia as well, starting a feud between the two women—only to get a surprise when Fidel unexpectedly dies. Dorothy teaches a history class for GED candidates…including Rose. Guest stars: Henry Darrow as Fidel Santiago; Ralph Ahn as Jim Shu; Magda Harout as Woman; Note: Rue McClanahan was nominated for an Emmy Award for Outstanding Lead Actress in a Comedy Series for this episode.
| 78 | 2 | "The Days and Nights of Sophia Petrillo" | Terry Hughes | Kathy Speer and Terry Grossman | October 22, 1988 | 077 | 28.7 |
Sophia plans to go to the market and buy a nectarine, which she does every day. The other girls worry that she is too old and frail to enjoy life. However, the tables are turned: Sophia has a full, active day of rallying fellow seniors to fight return policies at a supermarket, leading a charity band on the boardwalk, and volunteering at a hospital, while the other girls sit around the kitchen table talking about how to pass the time. Guest stars: Frances Bay as Claire; Nick DeMauro as Clerk; David Selburg as Store Manager
| 79 | 3 | "The One That Got Away" | Terry Hughes | Christopher Lloyd | October 29, 1988 | 080 | 31.3 |
Blanche is expecting a visit from a high-school friend (John Harkins) who, she claims, is the only man that ever rejected her. She becomes determined to seduce him to "perfect" her record—even when it turns out that he has grown fat and bald. However, it turns out Blanche's sister Virginia posed as her and slept with the man first, which was a less than memorable night. Meanwhile, Rose claims to have seen a UFO and gets the Air Force involved. Guest stars: John Harkins as Ham Lushbough; Tom Dahlgern as Major Barker; Nick Toth as Walter
| 80 | 4 | "Yokel Hero" | Terry Hughes | Martin Weiss and Robert Bruce | November 5, 1988 | 081 | 34.5 |
Rose is nominated to be St. Olaf, Minnesota's "Woman of the Year," but feels that her list of accomplishments is too bland to merit the prize. Blanche and Dorothy secretly change the list to make Rose sound more impressive, which wins her the award—and sends all four Girls on a lengthy trip to St. Olaf itself. Special Guest appearance: Richard Mulligan as Dr. Harry Weston. Guest stars: Jim Doughan as Ben; Doug Cox as Sven; John Moody as Len; James Lashley as The Driver; Valente Rodriguez as Fred; Note: This episode begins a crossover with Empty Nest that concludes on "Fatal Attraction".
| 81 | 5 | "Bang the Drum, Stanley" | Terry Hughes | Robert Bruce and Martin Weiss | November 12, 1988 | 079 | 33.1 |
Stan, hard-pressed for money, asks Dorothy and Sophia to a baseball game to butter up his ex-wife and get a loan. When Sophia is hit on the head by a fly ball at the game, Stan hatches a scheme to sue the ballpark, while Blanche and Rose prepare to be in a local musical production of Cats. Special Guest Star: Herb Edelman as Stanley; Guest stars: Ben Rawnsley as Dr. Jerry
| 82 | 6 | "Sophia's Wedding" | Terry Hughes | Barry Fanaro and Mort Nathan | November 19, 1988 | 082 | 35.7 |
| 83 | 7 | "Sophia's Wedding" | Terry Hughes | Barry Fanaro and Mort Nathan | November 26, 1988 | 083 | 38.2 |
Part 1: Sophia's dearest friend, Esther Weinstock, has died, and Sophia must confront her friend's widower, Max (Jack Gilford), whom she has always blamed for causing the pizza-knish stand owned by Max and Sophia’s husband, Salvadore (Sid Melton), to go out of business by betting a day's profits on a horse race. But at the repast, the truth comes out: Salvadore gambled the money away, and Max lied to save his marriage. This leads to Sophia to see Max in a new, romantic light, and the two eventually marry, much to Dorothy's frustration. Meanwhile, Rose and Blanche start an unofficial Elvis Presley Fan Club. Part 2: A stressed-out Dorothy starts smoking cigarettes again, 15 years after quitting. Sophia and Max return from their honeymoon, and they try to resurrect Max and Salvadore's old pizza-and-knish stand at the beach, which unfortunately burns down due to an electrical fault. Realizing that they're not as destined to be together as they were with their previous spouses, Sophia and Max have their marriage annulled, leading to Dorothy successfully quitting smoking again. Guest stars: Jack Gilford as Max Weinstock; Raye Birk as Caterer (Part 1 only), Sid Melton as Salvadore (Part 1 only); Notes: Minor appearance by then unknown future director Quentin Tarantino as an Elvis impersonator. Estelle Getty was nominated for an Emmy Award for Outstanding Supporting Actress in a Comedy Series and Jack Gilford was nominated for Outstanding Guest Actor in a Comedy Series for Part 2 of this episode.
| 84 | 8 | "Brother, Can You Spare That Jacket?" | Terry Hughes | Kathy Speer and Terry Grossman | December 3, 1988 | 084 | 34.5 |
Sophia accidentally donates Blanche's jacket to a thrift shop, with a winning lottery ticket worth $10,000 in the pocket. The jacket is purchased for Michael Jackson, who donates it to a charity auction after wearing it during a performance; a congressman buys it and donates it to a homeless shelter. Blanche, Rose, Dorothy, and Sophia spend the night at the shelter, where each has a meaningful conversation with someone who sleeps there by necessity. Rose connects with former hotel porter Ben Wheaton, a fellow Minnesotan who found himself without marketable skills in middle age. Blanche feels maternal towards Kenny, a young alcoholic who holds a doctorate. Sophia and Dorothy learn that Sophia's friend Ida Perkins, formerly of Shady Pines, became unable to pay her bills after outliving her entire family. Blanche, Rose, and Dorothy search among the diverse homeless population; Blanche finds the ticket, and the women donate the money to the shelter. Guest stars: Karl Wiedergott as Kenny; Matthew Faison as Father Campbell; Herta Ware as Ida; Teddy Wilson as Ben; Note: Terry Hughes was nominated for an Emmy Award for Outstanding Directing for a Comedy Series for this episode.
| 85 | 9 | "Scared Straight" | Terry Hughes | Christopher Lloyd | December 10, 1988 | 086 | 34.2 |
When Blanche's newly divorced brother, Clayton (Monte Markham), comes to town, he confides to Rose that he is gay; scared to tell Blanche the truth, though, he pretends to have bedded Rose. With Blanche furious at her roommate, Clayton is eventually forced to reveal the truth, sending Blanche into a tailspin of confusion and anger. Guest stars: Monte Markham as Clayton
| 86 | 10 | "Stan Takes a Wife" | Terry Hughes | Winifred Hervey-Stallworth | January 7, 1989 | 087 | 35.2 |
Stan breaks the news that he is engaged to be married for the third time. At first, Dorothy is thrilled at the prospect of getting him out of her life—but after Stan stays by her side when Sophia is hospitalized with a virus, old feelings start stirring. Rose and Blanche team up to keep Dorothy from interrupting the wedding, but a chance encounter with Stan's new bride, Katherine (Elinor Donahue), eventually convinces Dorothy to do the right thing. Special Guest Star: Herb Edelman as Stan; Guest stars: Elinor Donahue as Katherine
| 87 | 11 | "The Auction" | Terry Hughes | Eric Cohen | January 14, 1989 | 085 | 33.5 |
The girls face a leaking roof, but cannot afford to replace it. To get their minds off their troubles, they head to a gallery opening at Blanche's museum, where the obnoxious and rude Jasper DeKimmel (Tony Steedman) is being feted. When hospital volunteer Sophia reveals that DeKimmel is dying of a rare blood disease, Blanche hatches a scheme to purchase one of his paintings on the cheap and then sell it for a big profit after he passes away. Guest stars: Tony Steedman as Jasper DeKimmel; Michael McManus as Sid LaBass; Colin Hamilton as Auctioneer; Renata Scott as Woman; Derek Loughran as Mime
| 88 | 12 | "Blind Date" | Terry Hughes | Christopher Lloyd | January 28, 1989 | 089 | 32.8 |
After being dumped by her boyfriend, Blanche befriends a man at a bar and makes a date with him, not realizing that he is blind; Dorothy and Rose try their hands at coaching a children's football team. Guest stars: Ed Winter as John Quinn
| 89 | 13 | "The Impotence of Being Ernest" | Steve Zuckerman | Story by : Kevin Abbott; Teleplay by : Rick Copp and David A. Goodman | February 4, 1989 | 090 | 36.3 |
Rose hits it off with new beau Ernest (Richard Herd), but the two hit a snag when their relationship never quite gets physical. Meanwhile, Sophia fears a vendetta when she receives a black feather in the mail. Guest stars: Richard Herd as Ernie
| 90 | 14 | "Love Me Tender" | Terry Hughes | Richard Vaczy and Tracy Gamble | February 6, 1989 | 088 | 34.8 |
Sophia objects to Dorothy's "completely physical" relationship with a nondescript new lover, Eddie (John Fiedler). Blanche and Rose become pals with two motherless girls, who also happen to be juvenile delinquents. Guest stars: John Fiedler as Eddie; Stefanie Ridel as Jackie; Shana S. Washington as Marla; Note: Bea Arthur was nominated for an Emmy Award for Outstanding Lead Actress in a Comedy Series for this episode.
| 91 | 15 | "Valentine's Day" | Terry Hughes | Kathy Speer, Terry Grossman, Barry Fanaro, and Mort Nathan | February 11, 1989 | 101 | 36.0 |
The ladies remember the unique ways they have celebrated Valentine's Day in the past. Special guest star: Bill Dana as Papa Angelo; Special Appearance by: Julio Iglesias as himself Guest stars: Sid Melton as Salvadore; Pat McCormick as Clerk; Tom Isbell as Young Man
| 92 | 16 | "Two Rode Together" | Terry Hughes | Robert Bruce and Martin Weiss | February 18, 1989 | 091 | 34.9 |
Dorothy hopes to spend "quality time" with Sophia, while Sophia just wants to ride Space Mountain at Walt Disney World. Rose and Blanche collaborate to write a children's book. Special Appearance by: Freddie Jackson as Sam
| 93 | 17 | "You Gotta Have Hope" | Terry Hughes | Barry Fanaro and Mort Nathan | February 25, 1989 | 092 | 34.9 |
Dorothy is in charge of a talent show, and things are not going her way: she cannot find any talent for the show, and her emcee has just canceled. She only groans when Rose insists she can get (Bob Hope) to appear. Special guest star: Bob Hope as himself Guest stars: Douglas Seale as Seymour; Del Rubio triplets as The Donatello Triplets
| 94 | 18 | "Fiddler on the Ropes" | Terry Hughes | Kathy Speer and Terry Grossman | March 4, 1989 | 093 | 35.9 |
Sophia invests the girls' money in prizefighter Pepe (Chick Vennera), and are surprised to discover he is also an aspiring violinist. Guest stars: Chick Vennera as Pepe, Alfred Dennis as Charley, Pamela Kosh as Woman and Victor Contreras as Gonzales (voice).
| 95 | 19 | "Till Death Do We Volley" | Terry Hughes | Richard Vaczy and Tracy Gamble | March 18, 1989 | 096 | 30.8 |
Dorothy is visited by high school friend Trudy (Anne Francis), whose friendship with her is based on competition and practical jokes. The competition gets out of hand when Trudy collapses and apparently dies during a game of tennis, and Dorothy must break the news to their assembled classmates. Fortunately, it turns out to be another prank. Guest stars: Anne Francis as Trudy; Robert King as Jack
| 96 | 20 | "High Anxiety" | Terry Hughes | Martin Weiss and Robert Bruce | March 25, 1989 | 097 | 31.1 |
After Sophia accidentally knocks a bottle of Rose's pills down the sink, the girls learn that Rose is addicted. She battles withdrawal. Meanwhile, Dorothy and Sophia are hired to be in a pizza commercial. Guest stars: Jay Thomas as Sy Ferber; Note: Betty White was nominated for an Emmy Award for Outstanding Lead Actress in a Comedy Series for this episode.
| 97 | 21 | "Little Sister" | Terry Hughes | Christopher Lloyd | April 1, 1989 | 098 | 30.7 |
Rose catches her visiting sister Holly (Inga Swenson) with Blanche's boyfriend and tries to tell Blanche and Dorothy, who have been charmed by Holly and refuse to believe Rose. Meanwhile, Dorothy trusts Sophia to watch Dr. Harry Weston's dog, Dreyfuss. Guest stars: Inga Swenson as Holly; Jerry Hardin as Gary Tucker; Note: This episode is a crossover with Empty Nest, as Sophia takes care of the Weston's dog, Dreyfuss.
| 98 | 22 | "Sophia's Choice" | Terry Hughes | Richard Vaczy and Tracy Gamble | April 15, 1989 | 099 | 29.7 |
Sophia's friend Lillian (Ellen Albertini Dow) moves from Shady Pines to Sunny Pastures, a terrible facility. Sophia brings Lillian to stay at the house, where the women quickly realize Lillian requires full-time care that they are unable to provide. Dorothy and Sophia try to force Sunny Pastures to provide better care, only to find that there is no malfeasance they can address; the facility operates at a loss with insufficient government funding, and the overworked administrator is genuinely open to ideas, though Sophia and Dorothy have none. Rose identifies a better place for Lillian to stay, but the monthly cost exceeds Lillian's benefits by $150. Blanche had been planning to use a work bonus for breast augmentation but decides to use it to pay for two years of Lillian's care. The women, realizing this solves only one person's problems, vow to stay together as they age. Guest stars: Ellen Albertini Dow as Lillian; Ron Orbach as Dan Cummings
| 99 | 23 | "Rites of Spring" | Terry Hughes | Eric Cohen | April 29, 1989 | 102 | 27.8 |
Sophia obsesses over regaining a lost pound, while the other women decide to lose weight before a friend's pool party. They recall previous self-improvement attempts: Rose, Blanche, and Dorothy joined a gym, where enthusiastic trainer Yvonne (Hilary Shepard) convinced Blanche and Dorothy to buy expensive workout accessories and then injured herself leading an aerobics class; Sophia convinced the other women to visit hair stylist Eduardo (Lloyd Bochner), an attractive man who passionately described wildly different concepts for each woman's makeover but then styled their hair identically to Sophia's; and the women rejected Stanley's invitation to join a guru's encounter group and ended up arguing over Dorothy identifying Sophia as her best friend. Sophia accepts her lower weight after Dorothy determines that Sophia's height has shrunk. After learning the party is a day later than expected, the women devour Sophia's decadent cake. Special guest star: Herb Edelman as Stan; Guest stars: Lloyd Bochner as Hairdresser; Hilary Shepard as Yvonne
| 100 | 24 | "Foreign Exchange" | Terry Hughes | Harriet B. Helberg and Sandy Helberg | May 6, 1989 | 100 | 29.3 |
Sophia's old friends come to Miami from Sicily, Italy for a visit and have shocking news for Dorothy: they believe she is theirs, switched at birth with the daughter they raised. Meanwhile, Blanche and Rose take "dirty dancing" lessons; uncharacteristically, Blanche is not any good at it, while Rose is a quick study. Guest stars: Vito Scotti as Dominic Bosco; Nan Martin as Philomena Bosco
| 101 | 25 | "We're Outta Here" | Terry Hughes | Barry Fanaro & Mort Nathan | May 13, 1989 | 094 | 30.2 |
| 102 | 26 | "We're Outta Here" | Terry Hughes | Kathy Speer & Terry Grossman | May 13, 1989 | 095 | 30.2 |
Blanche, Dorothy, and Rose return home from a play to discover Sophia in the midst of selling the house. A "For Sale" sign was accidentally placed on the front lawn, but Blanche considers going through with the sale after learning the amount that she has been offered. Special guest star: Herb Edelman as Stan

== Awards and nominations ==
41st Primetime Emmy Awards

- Nomination for Outstanding Comedy Series
- Nomination for Outstanding Lead Actress in a Comedy Series (Beatrice Arthur) (Episode: "Love Me Tender")
- Nomination for Outstanding Lead Actress in a Comedy Series (Rue McClanahan) (Episode: "Yes, We Have No Havanas")
- Nomination for Outstanding Lead Actress in a Comedy Series (Betty White) (Episode: "High Anxiety")
- Nomination for Outstanding Supporting Actress in a Comedy Series (Estelle Getty) (Episode: "Sophia's Wedding")
- Nomination for Outstanding Guest Actor in a Comedy Series (Jack Gilford) (Episode: "Sophia's Wedding")
- Nomination for Outstanding Directing for a Comedy Series (Terry Hughes) (Episode: "Brother Can You Spare That Jacket")

46th Golden Globe Awards

- Nomination for Best Comedy Series
- Nomination for Best Actress in a Comedy Series (Beatrice Arthur)
- Nomination for Best Actress in a Comedy Series (Betty White)
