= Isn't It Romantic? (The Golden Girls) =

- The Golden Girls episode
- Episode no.: Season 2 Episode 5
- Directed by: Terry Hughes
- Written by: Jeffrey Duteil
- Original air date: November 8, 1986

Guest appearance
- Lois Nettleton as Jean

Episode chronology
- The Golden Girls (season 2)

"Isn't It Romantic?" is the fifth episode of the second season of The Golden Girls. The episode guest stars Lois Nettleton as Jean, a lesbian friend of Dorothy who comes to visit the girls, and who develops a crush on Rose. The episode aired on November 8, 1986 on NBC.

The episode ranked #4 in the Nielsen ratings for the week with a 27.3/45 rating/share, tying with "Ladies of the Evening" as the highest rated episode of the series. It was nominated for four Emmy Awards, with director Terry Hughes winning for Outstanding Directing for a Comedy Series. Modern commentators have praised the episode's sympathetic portrayal of a gay character as progressive for its time.

== Summary ==
Dorothy is preparing for a visit from her friend Jean, who is mourning the death of her partner, Pat. Dorothy is surprised to learn from Sophia that she has already surmised that Jean is a lesbian, but she decides not to tell Rose or Blanche, concerned that they would not understand.

When Rose and Jean are introduced, they become fast friends, and Jean later confesses to Dorothy that she is developing romantic feelings for Rose. That night, Dorothy tells this to Blanche. In a moment of comic misdirection, Blanche is aghast, but only because she resents that Jean would be attracted to Rose rather than her.

Late the same night, Rose and Jean share a bed, and Jean confesses her feelings to Rose. Rose gives a wide-eyed stare to the camera while pretending to be asleep.

The next morning, an embarrassed Jean is prepared to end her visit early. Rose tells her that, while she does not reciprocate her romantic feelings, she is flattered, and empathizes with Jean's loss of her partner. Rose and Jean agree to be good friends.

== Awards and nominations ==
For this episode, Terry Hughes won the Primetime Emmy Award for Outstanding Directing for a Comedy Series, and the Directors Guild of America Award for Outstanding Directing – Comedy Series.

The episode was the subject of three further Primetime Emmy nominations:

- Jeffrey Duteil was nominated for Outstanding Writing for a Comedy Series
- Betty White was nominated for Outstanding Lead Actress in a Comedy Series
- Lois Nettleton was nominated for Outstanding Guest Performer in a Comedy Series

== Legacy ==
Contemporary writers have generally praised the episode's handling of lesbian character Jean as progressive and emotionally touching. Writing in The A.V. Club in 2017, Molly Eichel commented: "Neither Jean nor her sexuality are at any points the butt of the episode; instead she’s treated with respect."

A scene in which Dorothy asks Sophia how she would react if she had a child who came out as gay, has been singled out by some commentators as emblematic of the episode's attitude of acceptance. Sophia responds:

I wouldn't love him one bit less; I would wish him every happiness in the world. Now keep your fat mouth shut so I can get some sleep.

== See also ==
- List of 1980s American television episodes with LGBT themes
