= Jonathan Schmock =

American actor

- Occupations: Actor, director, producer, writer, editorial cartoonist
- Years active: 1980–present

Jonathan Schmock is an American actor, television director, producer, writer, former stand-up comedian and editorial cartoonist.

He has worked on numerous film and television projects including Ferris Bueller's Day Off, where he played the maitre d' in a fancy restaurant. Television roles include Big Time Rush, Blossom, Double Trouble, Arrested Development, Star Trek: Enterprise, The Golden Girls and The Big Bang Theory. Additional film credits include Some Kind of Wonderful, City of Industry, and Surf Ninjas. He has also worked as a developer for Sabrina the Teenage Witch and as a writer on Real Time with Bill Maher, Dharma & Greg, Blossom and Brotherly Love, which he co-created with Jim Vallely.

== Filmography ==
- Ferris Bueller's Day Off (1986) - Chez Quis Maitre D'
- Shameless (2014) - Alan Kopchek
