= Tony Carreiro =

American actor

- Born: Anthony Carreiro; April 6, 1954 (age 72); Ithaca, New York, U.S.
- Education: Cornell University (BA); University of Washington (MFA)
- Spouse: Kathleen
- Children: 1

Anthony "Tony" Carreiro (born April 6, 1954) is an American actor and performing arts professor.

== Early life and education ==
Born in Ithaca, New York, Carreiro graduated from Ithaca High School. He earned his Bachelor of Arts at Cornell University in 1982 and a Master of Fine Arts from the Professional Actor Training Program at the University of Washington in 1985.

== Career ==
Carreiro works as a professor of acting courses at Long Beach City College. He is a certified sword fighter and a fighting choreographer for theatrical works and films, as well as stage combat courses in colleges.

=== Television ===
He played a gay English professor in the sitcom Doctor Doctor. He has had numerous notable guest-starring roles on several television series, including Charmed, Matlock, and especially sitcoms such as Caroline in the City, Home Improvement, Ellen, Wings, and The Golden Girls, where he played a waiter (twice) as well as a doctor. He also appeared as Daphne's boyfriend, Joe, in two episodes of Frasier, and as Ken, the eponymous “Relief Bartender”, in a season four episode of Cheers. He played Matt Sullivan, Tia and Tamera's biological father, in the sitcom Sister, Sister.

=== Film ===
He has also appeared in movies such as Lethal Weapon 2 (1989) and Liar Liar (1997).

== Personal life ==
He resides in Lake Balboa, California, with his wife Kathleen and daughter.

== Filmography ==
=== Film ===
Year	Title	Role	Notes
1988	The House on Carroll Street	Xanthias	
1989	Lethal Weapon 2	Marcelli	
1997	Liar Liar	Cop at Airport	
1999	The Dogwalker	Don	
2000	Lucky Numbers	Reporter	
2006	The Lost	Tom Wallace	

=== Television ===
Year	Title	Role	Notes
1985–1990	The Golden Girls	Various roles	3 episodes
1986	Cheers	Ken Charters	Episode: "Relief Bartender"
1986	Family Ties	Terry Bridgeman	Episode: "The Big Fix"
1986	Search for Tomorrow	Lt. Guardino	2 episodes
1987	L.A. Law	Stuart Conlin	Episode: "Goldilocks and the Three Barristers"
1988	Throb	Eric	Episode: "Men Without Lips"
1988	Hunter	Brad Lindquist	Episode: "Death Signs"
1988	Tour of Duty	Captain 173rd	Episode: "The Hill"
1988	Almost Grown	Billy	Episode: "Santa Claus Got Stuck in My Chimney"
1989–1991	Doctor Doctor	Richard Stratford	40 episodes
1991	Babes	Chef	Episode: "Babes, Lies, & Videotape"
1991, 1992	Homefront	Ben Mahoney	2 episodes
1992	Home Improvement	Dave	2 episodes
1993	Empty Nest	Mike	Episode: "Mom's the Word"
1994	Ellen	Jackson	Episode: "A Kiss Is Still a Kiss"
1994	Days of Our Lives	Dr. Burkhart	2 episodes
1994	Matlock	Frank Jefferies	Episode: "The Accused"
1995	Wings	Scott Tucker	Episode: "Have I Got a Couple for You"
1995	Thunder Alley	Peter Berlow	Episode: "Accidentally at First Sight"
1995	Women of the House	Lyle Fredericks	Episode: "Women in Film"
1995	Deadly Games	Harry Helstrom	2 episodes
1995	Land's End	Archie	Episode: "Parentnapping"
1995, 1996	Frasier	Joe DeCarlo	2 episodes
1996	ER	Brent Smythe	Episode: "Let the Games Begin"
1996	Brotherly Love	Jimmy	Episode: "Kernel of Truth"
1997	The Pretender	D.A. Mitch Meyers	Episode: "Baby Love"
1997	Caroline in the City	James Clark	Episode: "Caroline and the Novelist"
1997	Ned and Stacey	Jack Rossiter	Episode: "Best of Luck on Future Projects"
1998	Ask Harriet	Doctor	Episode: "Turn Your Head & Kafka"
1998	Born Free	Stuart	Episode: "Akilil & the Mouse"
1999	Sister, Sister	Matt Sullivan	2 episodes
1999	Locust Valley	Peter Shaw	Television film
2000	Charmed	Bill	Episode: "Once Upon a Time"
2000	Diagnosis: Murder	Mr. Santucci	Episode: "The Cradle Will Rock"
2001	Judging Amy	Alfred Faust	Episode: "Look Closer"
2002	Titus	Frank	Episode: "The Protector"
2003	The Agency	Bryan Magnuson	Episode: "Our Man in Korea"
