= Terry Hughes (director) =

British television director

- Born: United Kingdom
- Occupations: Director, producer

Terry Hughes is a British film and television director and producer.

He won the 1976 BAFTA Award for Best Entertainment Programme for The Two Ronnies, the 1985 Primetime Emmy Award for Outstanding Directing in a Variety or Music Program for Sweeney Todd: The Demon Barber of Fleet Street, and the 1987 Primetime Emmy Award for Outstanding Directing for a Comedy Series for The Golden Girls. He directed 108 episodes of The Golden Girls between 1985 and 1990.

== Career ==
Hughes has produced or directed BBC TV variety shows such as Val Doonican, Harry Secombe and Kenneth Williams and series such as Ripping Yarns. He is probably best known in the UK for being the producer and director of The Two Ronnies from 1971 to 1976. He earned six consecutive BAFTA nominations for his work on this show, winning once in 1976.

In 1985, as part of his work in America, Hughes won an Emmy for Outstanding Directing for a Variety or Music Program for directing the televised version of the musical Sweeney Todd: The Demon Barber of Fleet Street, starring George Hearn and Angela Lansbury.

He has also produced and directed episodes of shows such as 3rd Rock from the Sun and Friends. Hughes is perhaps best known in America for being the primary episodic director for The Golden Girls during its first five seasons, directing 108 of the first 126 episodes from 1985 to 1990. He won an Emmy for Outstanding Directing for a Comedy Series in 1987, for the season two episode "Isn't it Romantic?"

In 1972 he was the director for the Eurovision Song Contest, held in Edinburgh, Scotland.

Other than television Hughes has also directed films such as Monty Python Live at the Hollywood Bowl (which he co-directed with Ian MacNaughton) and The Butcher's Wife.

Hughes now lives in California.

Preceded by (Republic of Ireland) Tom McGrath	Eurovision Song Contest Director; 1972	Succeeded by (Luxembourg) Rene Konz
