= List of awards and nominations received by The Golden Girls =

The Golden Girls
Awards and nominations
Award	Wins	Nominations
American Comedy Awards	4	4
ASCAP Film and Television Music Awards	4	4
BMI Film & TV Awards	5	5
Directors Guild of America Award	2	3
Emmy Awards	11	68
Golden Globe Awards	4	21
TCA Awards	1	2
TV Land Award	2	4
Viewers for Quality Television	2	3
Writers Guild of America Award	1	5
Young Artist Award	1	3

Totals (Note: Certain award groups do not simply award one winner. They acknowledge several different recipients, have runners-up, and have third place. Since this is a specific recognition and is different from losing an award, runner-up mentions are considered wins in this award tally. For simplification and to avoid errors, each award in this list has been presumed to have had a prior nomination.)
- Wins: 37
- Nominations: 122

The Golden Girls is an American television sitcom created by Susan Harris and produced by Witt/Thomas/Harris Productions. The series focuses on four older women all sharing a home in Miami, Florida. Bea Arthur, Betty White, Rue McClanahan and Estelle Getty portray the four main characters Dorothy Zbornak, Rose Nylund, Blanche Devereaux and Sophia Petrillo. The Golden Girls aired on NBC from September 14, 1985, to May 9, 1992, broadcasting 180 episodes over seven seasons during its initial run.

During the series' run, The Golden Girls received nominations for a variety of different awards, including 68 Emmy Awards (with 11 wins), 21 Golden Globe Awards (with 4 wins), 5 American Comedy Awards (all wins), 3 Directors Guild of America Awards (with 2 wins), and 5 Writers Guild of America Awards (with one win). The lead actresses all won Emmy Awards — Arthur, McClanahan and White won the award for Outstanding Lead Actress in a Comedy Series and Getty won for Outstanding Supporting Actress in a Comedy Series. The cast were named Disney Legends in 2009.

== Awards and nominations ==
=== American Comedy Awards ===
Betty White won an American Comedy Award for Funniest Female Performer in a TV Series (Leading Role) Network, Cable or Syndication in 1987 and received a nomination for the award in 1990. In 1990, White also received the Lifetime Achievement Award in Comedy. Estelle Getty won the award for Funniest Supporting Female Performer in a TV Series in 1991 and 1992.

Year	Category	Nominee(s)	Result	Ref
1987	Funniest Female Performer in a TV Series (Leading Role) Network, Cable or Syndication	Betty White	Won	
1990	Funniest Female Performer in a TV Series (Leading Role) Network, Cable or Syndication	Betty White	Nominated	
1990	Lifetime Achievement Award in Comedy	Betty White	Won	
1991	Funniest Supporting Female Performer in a TV Series	Estelle Getty	Won	
1992	Funniest Supporting Female Performer in a TV Series	Estelle Getty	Won	

=== ASCAP Film and Television Music Awards ===
Year	Category	Nominee(s)	Result	Ref
1988	Top TV Series	George Aliceson Tipton	Won	
1989	Top TV Series	George Aliceson Tipton	Won	
1990	Top TV Series	George Aliceson Tipton	Won	
1991	Top TV Series	George Aliceson Tipton	Won	

=== BMI Film & TV Awards ===
Year	Category	Nominee(s)	Result	Ref
1987	Best TV Series	Andrew Gold	Won	
1988	Best TV Series	Andrew Gold	Won	
1989	Best TV Series	Andrew Gold	Won	
1990	Best TV Series	Andrew Gold	Won	
1991	Best TV Series	Andrew Gold	Won	

=== Directors Guild of America Awards ===
Director Jay Sandrich won a Directors Guild of America Award for Outstanding Directing – Comedy Series in 1985 for his work on the pilot episode "The Engagement". Terry Hughes, one of the series' most prominent directors, received the award the following year for his work on the second-season episode "Isn't it Romantic?". Hughes was also nominated for the same award in 1987, but lost to Will Mackenzie, for the Family Ties episode "My Name is Alex".

Year	Category	Nominee(s)	Result	Ref
1985	Outstanding Directing – Comedy Series	Jay Sandrich for "Pilot"	Won	
1986	Outstanding Directing – Comedy Series	Terry Hughes for "Isn't it Romantic?"	Won	
1987	Outstanding Directing – Comedy Series	Terry Hughes for "Old Friends"	Nominated	

=== Emmy Awards ===
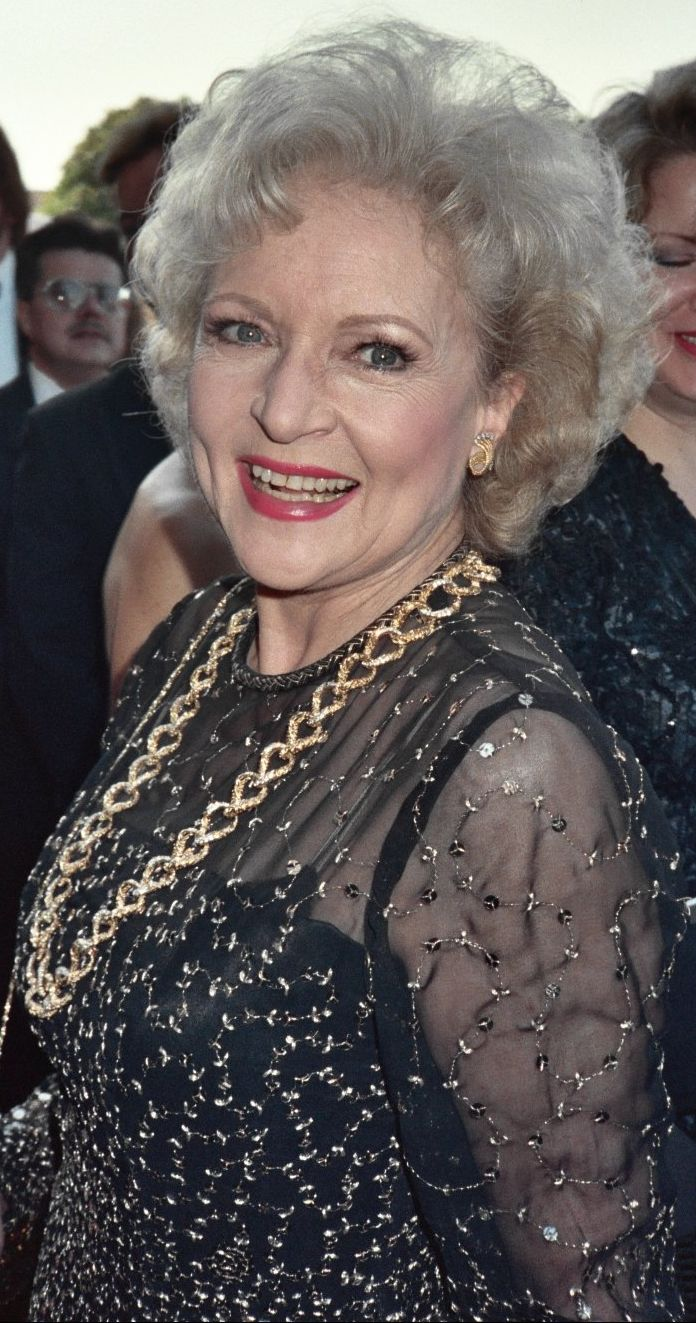
Betty White won an Emmy award for Outstanding Lead Actress in a Comedy Series in 1986 and was nominated in the category every year through the final season of The Golden Girls.

The Golden Girls received 58 Primetime Emmy Award nominations, with eleven wins — eight Primetime and three Creative Arts. The series won the award for Outstanding Comedy Series in 1986 and 1987. All four principal stars won an Emmy Award for their performances, a milestone that only three other series (All in the Family, Will & Grace, and Schitt’s Creek) have achieved; of these four series, it is the only one whose cast had actors competing against each other in the same category. Betty White won the award for Outstanding Lead Actress in a Comedy Series in 1986, with Rue McClanahan winning the award in 1987 and Bea Arthur winning in 1988. In 1988, Estelle Getty won the award for Outstanding Supporting Actress in a Comedy Series. Barry Fanaro and Mort Nathan won the Primetime Emmy Award for Outstanding Writing for a Comedy Series for the first-season episode "A Little Romance". Terry Hughes won the award for Outstanding Directing for a Comedy Series for the season two episode "Isn't It Romantic?". The three Creative Arts Emmy Awards the series won were for Outstanding Technical Direction/Electronic Camerawork/Video Control for a Series in 1986, 1988 and 1992.

==== Primetime Emmy Awards ====
Year	Category	Nominee(s)	Episodes(s)	Result	Ref
1986	Outstanding Comedy Series	Paul Bogart, Terry Grossman, Kathy Speer, Tony Thomas, Marsha Posner Williams, and Paul Junger Witt		Won	
1986	Outstanding Lead Actress in a Comedy Series	Bea Arthur as "Dorothy Zbornak"	for "The Triangle"	Nominated	
1986	Outstanding Lead Actress in a Comedy Series	Rue McClanahan as "Blanche Devereaux"	for "The Way We Met"	Nominated	
1986	Outstanding Lead Actress in a Comedy Series	Betty White as "Rose Nylund"	for "In a Bed of Rose's"	Won	
1986	Outstanding Supporting Actress in a Comedy Series	Estelle Getty as Sophia Petrillo		Nominated	
1986	Outstanding Directing for a Comedy Series	Jim Drake	for "The Heart Attack"	Nominated	
1986	Outstanding Directing for a Comedy Series	Terry Hughes	for "A Little Romance"	Nominated	
1986	Outstanding Writing for a Comedy Series	Barry Fanaro and Mort Nathan	for "A Little Romance"	Won	
1986	Outstanding Writing for a Comedy Series	Susan Harris	for "Pilot"	Nominated	
1987	Outstanding Comedy Series	Barry Fanaro, Terry Grossman, Susan Harris, Winifred Hervey, Mort Nathan, Kathy Speer, Tony Thomas, Marsha Posner Williams, and Paul Junger Witt		Won	
1987	Outstanding Lead Actress in a Comedy Series	Bea Arthur	for "The Stan Who Came to Dinner"	Nominated	
1987	Outstanding Lead Actress in a Comedy Series	Rue McClanahan	for "End of the Curse"	Won	
1987	Outstanding Lead Actress in a Comedy Series	Betty White	for "Isn't It Romantic?"	Nominated	
1987	Outstanding Supporting Actress in a Comedy Series	Estelle Getty		Nominated	
1987	Outstanding Directing for a Comedy Series	Terry Hughes	for "Isn't It Romantic?"	Won	
1987	Outstanding Writing for a Comedy Series	Jeffrey Duteil	for "Isn't It Romantic?"	Nominated	
1987	Outstanding Guest Actor in a Comedy Series	Herb Edelman as "Stan Zbornak"	for "The Stan Who Came to Dinner"	Nominated	
1987	Outstanding Guest Actor in a Comedy Series	Lois Nettleton as "Jean"	for "Isn't It Romantic?"	Nominated	
1987	Outstanding Guest Actor in a Comedy Series	Nancy Walker as "Angela"	for "Long Day's Journey Into Marinara"	Nominated	
1988	Outstanding Comedy Series	Jeffrey Ferro, Terry Grossman, Susan Harris, Winifred Hervey, Kathy Speer, Tony Thomas, Fredric Weiss, Marsha Posner Williams, and Paul Junger Witt		Nominated	
1988	Outstanding Lead Actress in a Comedy Series	Bea Arthur	for "My Brother, My Father"	Won	
1988	Outstanding Lead Actress in a Comedy Series	Rue McClanahan	for "Strange Bedfellows"	Nominated	
1988	Outstanding Lead Actress in a Comedy Series	Betty White	for "Bringing Up Baby"	Nominated	
1988	Outstanding Supporting Actress in a Comedy Series	Estelle Getty as Sophia Petrillo	for "Old Friends"	Won	
1988	Outstanding Directing for a Comedy Series	Terry Hughes	for "Old Friends"	Nominated	
1988	Outstanding Guest Actor in a Comedy Series	Herb Edelman as "Stan Zbornak"	for "The Audit"	Nominated	
1988	Outstanding Guest Actor in a Comedy Series	Geraldine Fitzgerald as "Anna"	for "Mother's Day"	Nominated	
1989	Outstanding Comedy Series	Paul Junger Witt, Tony Thomas, Susan Harris, Kathy Speer, Terry Grossman, Mort Nathan, Barry Fanaro, Eric Cohen, Martin Weiss, and Robert Bruce		Nominated	
1989	Outstanding Lead Actress in a Comedy Series	Bea Arthur	for "Love Me Tender"	Nominated	
1989	Outstanding Lead Actress in a Comedy Series	Rue McClanahan	for "Yes, We Have No Havanas"	Nominated	
1989	Outstanding Lead Actress in a Comedy Series	Betty White	for "High Anxiety"	Nominated	
1989	Outstanding Supporting Actress in a Comedy Series	Estelle Getty as Sophia Petrillo	for "Sophia's Wedding"	Nominated	
1989	Outstanding Directing for a Comedy Series	Terry Hughes	for "Brother Can You Spare That Jacket"	Nominated	
1989	Outstanding Guest Actor in a Comedy Series	Jack Gilford as "Max Weinstock"	for "Sophia's Wedding"	Nominated	
1990	Outstanding Comedy Series	Robert Bruce, Tracy Gamble, Susan Harris, Terry Hughes, Philip Jayson Lasker, Gail Parent, Marc Sotkin, Tony Thomas, Richard Vaczy, Martin Weiss, Tom Whedon, and Paul Junger Witt		Nominated	
1990	Outstanding Lead Actress in a Comedy Series	Betty White	for "Rose Fights Back"	Nominated	
1990	Outstanding Supporting Actress in a Comedy Series	Estelle Getty as Sophia Petrillo	for "Not Another Monday"	Nominated	
1990	Outstanding Directing for a Comedy Series	Terry Hughes	for "Triple Play"	Nominated	
1990	Outstanding Guest Actor in a Comedy Series	Jerry Orbach as "Glen O'Brien"	for "Cheaters"	Nominated	
1990	Outstanding Guest Actor in a Comedy Series	Dick Van Dyke as "Ken Whittingham"	for "Love Under the Big Top"	Nominated	
1991	Outstanding Comedy Series	Nina Feinberg, Tracy Gamble, Susan Harris, Paul Junger Witt, Philip Jayson Lasker, Gail Parent, Jerry Perzigian, Don Seigel, Marc Sotkin, Tony Thomas, Richard Vaczy, and Tom Whedon		Nominated	
1991	Outstanding Lead Actress in a Comedy Series	Betty White	for "Once, in St. Olaf"	Nominated	
1991	Outstanding Supporting Actress in a Comedy Series	Estelle Getty as Sophia Petrillo	for "Ebbtide's Revenge"	Nominated	
1991	Outstanding Guest Actor in a Comedy Series	Brenda Vaccaro as "Angela"	for "Ebbtide's Revenge"	Nominated	
1992	Outstanding Lead Actress in a Comedy Series	Betty White	for "Dateline: Miami"	Nominated	
1992	Outstanding Supporting Actress in a Comedy Series	Estelle Getty as Sophia Petrillo	for "One Flew Out the Cuckoo's Nest"	Nominated	

==== Creative Arts Emmy Awards ====
Year	Category	Nominee(s)	Episodes(s)	Result	Ref
1986	Outstanding Art Direction for a Series	Edward Stephenson	for "Pilot"	Nominated	
1986	Outstanding Achievement in Costuming for a Series	Judy Evans	for "Nice and Easy"	Nominated	
1986	Outstanding Editing for a Series (Multi-Camera Production)	Harold McKenzie	for "Pilot"	Nominated	
1986	Outstanding Lighting Direction (Electronic) for a Series	Alan Walker	for "On Golden Girls"	Nominated	
1986	Outstanding Sound Mixing for a Comedy Series or Special	Terri Lynn Fraser, Allen Patapoff, Craig Porter, and Ken Quale	for "Pilot"	Nominated	
1986	Outstanding Technical Direction/Electronic Camerawork/Video Control for a Series	Randy Baer, Victor Bagdadi, Gerry Bucci, Dale Carlson, Steve Jones, and Donna Quante	for "Pilot"	Won	
1987	Outstanding Editing for a Series (Multi-Camera Production)	Harold McKenzie	for "Twas the Nightmare Before Christmas"	Nominated	
1987	Outstanding Sound Mixing for a Comedy Series or Special	Richard Burns, Ed Epstein, Allen Patapoff and Craig Porter	for "Ladies of the Evening"	Nominated	
1987	Outstanding Sound Mixing for a Comedy Series or Special	Edward L. Moskowitz, John S. Orr, Allen Patapoff and Craig Porter	for "A Piece of Cake"	Nominated	
1987	Outstanding Technical Direction/Electronic Camerawork/Video Control for a Series	O. Tamburri, Jack Chisolm, Ritch Kennedy, Ken Tamburri, Carol Wetovich, and Bob Kaufman	for "Forgive Me Father"	Nominated	
1988	Outstanding Editing for a Series (Multi-Camera Production)	Jim McElroy	for "Old Friends"	Nominated	
1988	Outstanding Lighting Direction (Electronic) for a Series	Alan Walker	for "Old Friends"	Nominated	
1988	Outstanding Sound Mixing for a Comedy Series or Special	Edward L. Moskowitz, Allen Patapoff, and Craig Porter	for "Old Friends"	Nominated	
1988	Outstanding Technical Direction/Electronic Camerawork/Video Control for a Series	O. Tamburri, Jack Chisolm, Stephen A. Jones, Ritch Kenney, Ken Tamburri, and Bob Kaufman	for "Old Friends"	Won	
1989	Outstanding Lighting Direction (Electronic) for a Series	Alan Walker	for "Yokel Hero"	Nominated	
1989	Outstanding Sound Mixing for a Comedy Series or Special	Edward L. Moskowitz, Allen Patapoff, and Craig Porter	for "You Gotta Have Hope"	Nominated	
1989	Outstanding Technical Direction/Electronic Camerawork/Video Control for a Series	O. Tamburri, Ritch Kenney, Ken Tamburri, Chester Jackson, Stephen A. Jones, and John O'Brien	for "Brother, Can You Spare That Jacket"	Nominated	
1990	Outstanding Lighting Direction (Electronic) for a Series	Alan Walker	for "Ebb Tide"	Nominated	
1990	Outstanding Technical Direction/Electronic Camerawork/Video Control for a Series	O. Tamburri, Ritch Kennedy, Chester Jackson, Stephen A. Jones, Dave Heckman, Randy Johnson	for "Love Under The Big Top"	Nominated	
1991	Outstanding Lighting Direction (Electronic) for a Series	Alan Walker	for "The Bloom is Off the Rose"	Nominated	
1991	Outstanding Technical Direction/Electronic Camerawork/Video Control for a Series	Kenneth Tamburri, Ritch Kennedy, Chester Jackson, Stephen A. Jones, Dave Heckman, Randy Johnson	for "What a Difference a Date Makes"	Nominated	
1992	Outstanding Technical Direction/Electronic Camerawork/Video Control for a Series	Dave Heckman, Chester Jackson, Stephen A. Jones, Randy Johnson, Ritch Kennedy, Bob Keys, John O'Brien, Richard Steiner, and Kenneth Tamburri	for "One Flew Out the Cuckoo's Nest" Parts 1 and 2	Won	

=== Golden Globe Awards ===
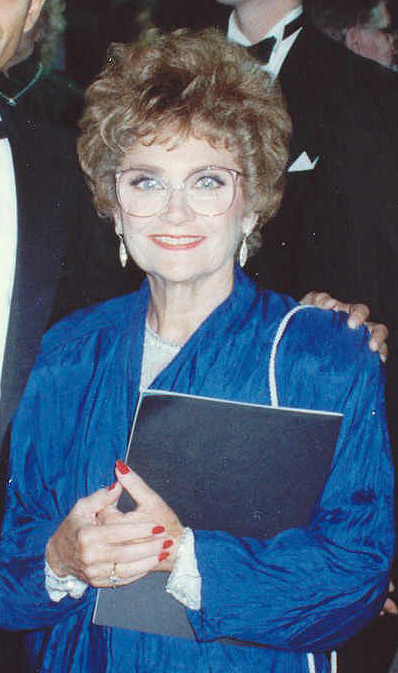
Estelle Getty is the only cast member to win a Golden Globe award.

The Golden Girls received 21 Golden Globe Award nominations during its tenure, with four wins — three for Best Television Series – Musical or Comedy in 1986, 1987, and 1988. Estelle Getty won the award for Best Actress – Television Series Musical or Comedy, tying with Moonlighting's Cybill Shepherd for the award.

Year	Category	Nominee(s)	Result	Ref
1986	Best Television Series – Musical or Comedy		Won	
1986	Best Actress – Television Series Musical or Comedy	Bea Arthur as Dorothy Zbornak	Nominated	
1986	Best Actress – Television Series Musical or Comedy	Estelle Getty as Sophia Petrillo	Won	
1986	Best Actress – Television Series Musical or Comedy	Rue McClanahan as Blanche Devereaux	Nominated	
1986	Best Actress – Television Series Musical or Comedy	Betty White as Rose Nylund	Nominated	
1987	Best Television Series – Musical or Comedy		Won	
1987	Best Actress – Television Series Musical or Comedy	Bea Arthur as Dorothy Zbornak	Nominated	
1987	Best Actress – Television Series Musical or Comedy	Estelle Getty as Sophia Petrillo	Nominated	
1987	Best Actress – Television Series Musical or Comedy	Rue McClanahan as Blanche Devereaux	Nominated	
1987	Best Actress – Television Series Musical or Comedy	Betty White as Rose Nylund	Nominated	
1988	Best Television Series – Musical or Comedy		Won	
1988	Best Actress – Television Series Musical or Comedy	Bea Arthur as Dorothy Zbornak	Nominated	
1988	Best Actress – Television Series Musical or Comedy	Rue McClanahan as Blanche Devereaux	Nominated	
1988	Best Actress – Television Series Musical or Comedy	Betty White as Rose Nylund	Nominated	
1989	Best Television Series – Musical or Comedy		Nominated	
1989	Best Actress – Television Series Musical or Comedy	Bea Arthur as Dorothy Zbornak	Nominated	
1989	Best Actress – Television Series Musical or Comedy	Betty White as Rose Nylund	Nominated	
1990	Best Television Series – Musical or Comedy		Nominated	
1991	Best Television Series – Musical or Comedy		Nominated	
1992	Best Television Series – Musical or Comedy		Nominated	
1992	Best Supporting Actress – Series, Miniseries or Television Film	Estelle Getty as Sophia Petrillo	Nominated	

=== TV Land Awards ===
Year	Category	Nominee(s)	Result	Ref
2003	Quintessential Non-Traditional Family	Bea Arthur, Estelle Getty, Rue McClanahan, and Betty White	Won	
2004	Favorite "Big, Bad Momma"	Estelle Getty	Nominated	
2007	Favorite Elvis Impersonation	Quentin Tarantino	Nominated	
2008	Pop Culture Award	Bea Arthur, Rue McClanahan and Betty White	Won	

=== Viewers for Quality Television Awards ===
Year	Category	Nominee(s)	Result	Ref
1987	Best Actress in a Quality Comedy Series	Betty White	Won	
1988	Best Actress in a Quality Comedy Series	Betty White	Won	
1988	Best Quality Comedy Series		Nominated	

=== Writers Guild of America (WGA) ===
Year	Category	Nominee(s)	Result	Ref
1987	Award for Television: Episodic Comedy	James Berg and Stan Zimmerman for "Blanche and the Younger Man"	Nominated	
1988	Award for Television: Episodic Comedy	Barry Fanaro and Mort Nathan for "'Twas the Nightmare Before Christmas"	Won	
1988	Award for Television: Episodic Comedy	Kathy Speer, Terry Grossman, Mort Nathan, and Barry Fanaro for "A Piece of Cake"	Nominated	
1989	Award for Television: Episodic Comedy	Kathy Speer and Terry Grossman for "Old Friends"	Nominated	
1992	Award for Television: Episodic Comedy	Marc Sotkin for "Ebbtide's Revenge"	Nominated	

=== Young Artist Awards ===
Year	Category	Nominee(s)	Result	Ref
1987	Exceptional Performance by a Young Actor, Guest Starring in a Television, Comedy or Drama Series	Billy Jayne	Won	
1989	Best Young Actress Guest Starring in a Drama or Comedy Series	Jenny Lewis	Nominated	
1992	Best Young Actress Guest Starring or Recurring Role in a TV Series	Alisan Porter	Nominated	

=== Other awards ===
Award	Date of ceremony	Category	Nominee(s)	Result	Ref
Bambi Awards	1992	TV Series International	Bea Arthur as Dorothy Zbornak	Won	
Online Film & Television Association Television Awards	2004	TV Hall of Fame — Television Programs		Won	
People's Choice Awards	March 13, 1986	Favorite New TV Comedy Program		Won	
Retirement Research Foundation Awards	1989	Television and Theatrical Film Fiction	Susan Harris, Paul Junger Witt, and Tony Thomas	Won	
TCA Awards	1986	Outstanding Achievement in Comedy		Nominated	
TCA Awards	2021	Heritage Award		Won	
TP de Oro	1989	Best Foreign Series (Mejor Serie Extranjera)		Won	
