= Pacific Station (TV series) =

- Genre: Sitcom police comedy
- Created by: Barry Fanaro; Mort Nathan; Kathy Speer; Terry Grossman
- Directed by: Art Dielhenn; James Burrows; Gary Brown
- Starring: Robert Guillaume; Richard Libertini; Ron Leibman; Joel Murray; Megan Gallagher; John Hancock
- Opening theme: "Rescue Me"
- Composers: Scott Gale; Rich Eames
- Country of origin: United States
- Original language: English
- No. of seasons: 1
- No. of episodes: 13 (2 unaired)

Production
- Running time: 30 minutes
- Production companies: KTMB Productions; Touchstone Television

Original release
- Network: NBC
- Release: September 15, 1991 – July 13, 1992

Pacific Station is an American sitcom television series starring Robert Guillaume and Richard Libertini that aired on NBC from September 15, 1991, to July 13, 1992. The series was created by the team of Barry Fanaro, Mort Nathan, Kathy Speer and Terry Grossman.

== Synopsis ==
Pacific Station centered around Detective Bob Ballard (Robert Guillaume), a wisecracking veteran cop who had been assigned to Pacific Station in Venice, California, apparently usually a dumping ground for eccentric and/or incompetent officers. Even more eccentric were the suspects the officers of Pacific Station brought in, as many were from nearby Venice Beach, a celebratedly off-center locale. The other officers of Pacific Station included Detective Richard Capparelli (Richard Libertini), fresh from treatment for his psychological problems, Detective Sandy Calloway (Megan Gallagher), and the brown-nosing Detective Al Burkhardt (Ron Leibman). In command of this hodgepodge was the recently promoted, immature, mother-fixated Captain Ken Epstein (Joel Murray), who had received the place which logic dictated should have gone to Bob. Frequently blustering his way through the station was Deputy Commissioner Hank Bishop (John Hancock), who never let anyone forget for a moment that he was a deputy commissioner.

Richard Libertini had just recently worked with creators/producers Fanaro, Nathan, Speer and Grossman on NBC's The Fanelli Boys the previous season.

== Cast ==
- Robert Guillaume as Det. Bob Ballard
- Richard Libertini as Det. Richard Capparelli
- Megan Gallagher as Det. Sandy Calloway
- Ron Leibman as Det. Al Burkhardt
- Joel Murray as Capt. Ken Epstein
- John Hancock as Dep. Commissioner Hank Bishop

== Scheduling ==
Pacific Station did not garner solid ratings, due to competition from ABC's America's Funniest People and CBS's Murder, She Wrote. It was put on hiatus in October 1991. Brought back in a new time slot in December, it was permanently cancelled in January 1992.

== Title sequence ==
The opening theme for Pacific Station was an in-house cover of Fontella Bass' "Rescue Me". The sequence began with shots of Venice Beach attractions, followed by the view of a police truck driving into the parking lot of the station as the title appeared on-screen. This proceeded into more videotaped scenes of the show and cast.

== Episodes ==
No.	Title	Directed by	Written by	Original release date
1	"Pilot"	James Burrows	Barry Fanaro & Mort Nathan & Kathy Speer & Terry Grossman	September 15, 1991
2	"Magnificent Obession"	Art Dielhenn	Martin Weiss & Robert Bruce	September 22, 1991
3	"A Man's Best Friend"	Art Dielhenn	Kathy Speer & Terry Grossman	September 29, 1991
4	"Love and Death"	Art Dielhenn	Mort Nathan & Barry Fanaro	October 6, 1991
5	"Friend of the Devil"	Art Dielhenn	Michael Davidoff & Bill Rosenthal	October 13, 1991
6	"Miata Es Su Ata"	Art Dielhenn	Tom Maxwell & Don Woodard	October 20, 1991
7	"Waiting for the Other Gumshoe to Drop"	Art Dielhenn	Stephen A. Miller	October 27, 1991
8	"Bob's Son"	Gary Brown	Teresa O'Neill	December 20, 1991
9	"Operation!"	Unknown	Unknown	December 27, 1991
10	"My Favorite Dad"	Art Dielhenn	Robert Bruce & Martin Weiss	January 3, 1992
11	"Whose Dad Is It Anyway?"	Unknown	Unknown	July 13, 1992
12	"The Last Angry Detective"	TBD	TBD	UNAIRED
13	"One for the Road"	TBD	TBD	UNAIRED
