= List of The Golden Girls episodes =

The Golden Girls is a television sitcom that ran on NBC from September 14, 1985, to May 9, 1992. A total of 180 episodes were produced, including 11 one-hour episodes.

== Series overview ==
| Season | Episodes | Originally released | | Rank | Rating | Viewers (millions) |
| Season | Episodes | First released | Last released | Rank | Rating | Viewers (millions) |
|---|---|---|---|---|---|---|
| 1 | 25 | September 14, 1985 | May 10, 1986 | 7 | 21.8 | —N/a |
| 2 | 26 | September 27, 1986 | May 16, 1987 | 5 | 24.5 | —N/a |
| 3 | 25 | September 19, 1987 | May 7, 1988 | 4 | 21.8 | —N/a |
| 4 | 26 | October 8, 1988 | May 13, 1989 | 6 | 21.4 | 33.1 |
| 5 | 26 | September 23, 1989 | May 5, 1990 | 6 | 20.1 | 30.8 |
| 6 | 26 | September 22, 1990 | May 4, 1991 | 10 | 16.5 | 24.6 |
| 7 | 26 | September 21, 1991 | May 9, 1992 | 30 | 13.1 | 19.2 |

== Episodes ==
=== Season 1 (1985–86) ===
| No. overall | No. in season | Title | Directed by | Written by | Original release date | Prod. code | Rating/share (households) |
|---|---|---|---|---|---|---|---|
| 1 | 1 | "The Engagement" | Jay Sandrich | Susan Harris | September 14, 1985 | 001 | 25.0/43 |
| 2 | 2 | "Guess Who's Coming to the Wedding?" | Paul Bogart | Winifred Hervey | September 21, 1985 | 004 | 22.5/40 |
| 3 | 3 | "Rose the Prude" | Jim Drake | Barry Fanaro and Mort Nathan | September 28, 1985 | 006 | 19.0/32 |
| 4 | 4 | "Transplant" | Paul Bogart | Susan Harris | October 5, 1985 | 005 | 21.8/37 |
| 5 | 5 | "The Triangle" | Jim Drake | Winifred Hervey | October 19, 1985 | 009 | 18.6/30 |
| 6 | 6 | "On Golden Girls" | Jim Drake | Liz Sage | October 26, 1985 | 007 | 18.6/31 |
| 7 | 7 | "The Competition" | Jim Drake | Barry Fanaro and Mort Nathan | November 2, 1985 | 010 | 19.6/31 |
| 8 | 8 | "Break-In" | Paul Bogart | Susan Harris | November 9, 1985 | 003 | 19.0/29 |
| 9 | 9 | "Blanche and the Younger Man" | Jim Drake | James Berg and Stan Zimmerman | November 16, 1985 | 011 | 23.2/36 |
| 10 | 10 | "The Heart Attack" | Jim Drake | Susan Harris | November 23, 1985 | 013 | 23.6/37 |
| 11 | 11 | "Stan's Return" | Jim Drake | Kathy Speer and Terry Grossman | November 30, 1985 | 012 | 23.2/37 |
| 12 | 12 | "The Custody Battle" | Terry Hughes | Winifred Hervey | December 7, 1985 | 014 | 20.3/33 |
| 13 | 13 | "A Little Romance" | Terry Hughes | Barry Fanaro and Mort Nathan | December 14, 1985 | 015 | 21.9/36 |
| 14 | 14 | "That Was No Lady" | Jim Drake | Liz Sage | December 21, 1985 | 008 | 19.3/33 |
| 15 | 15 | "In a Bed of Rose's" | Terry Hughes | Susan Harris | January 11, 1986 | 016 | 24.0/38 |
| 16 | 16 | "The Truth Will Out" | Terry Hughes | Susan Beavers | January 18, 1986 | 017 | 24.2/39 |
| 17 | 17 | "Nice and Easy" | Terry Hughes | Stuart Silverman | February 1, 1986 | 018 | 22.8/37 |
| 18 | 18 | "The Operation" | Terry Hughes | Winifred Hervey | February 8, 1986 | 019 | 21.5/34 |
| 19 | 19 | "Second Motherhood" | Gary Shimokawa | Christopher Lloyd | February 15, 1986 | 020 | 21.7/33 |
| 20 | 20 | "Adult Education" | Jack Shea | James Berg and Stan Zimmerman | February 22, 1986 | 021 | 25.2/41 |
| 21 | 21 | "The Flu" | Terry Hughes | James Berg and Stan Zimmerman | March 1, 1986 | 023 | 24.6/41 |
| 22 | 22 | "Job Hunting" | Paul Bogart | Kathy Speer and Terry Grossman | March 8, 1986 | 002 | 22.3/37 |
| 23 | 23 | "Blind Ambitions" | Terry Hughes | Bob Colleary | March 29, 1986 | 024 | 21.8/38 |
| 24 | 24 | "Big Daddy" | Terry Hughes | Barry Fanaro and Mort Nathan | May 3, 1986 | 022 | 21.7/39 |
| 25 | 25 | "The Way We Met" | Terry Hughes | Kathy Speer, Terry Grossman, Winifred Hervey, Mort Nathan, and Barry Fanaro | May 10, 1986 | 025 | 19.9/38 |

=== Season 2 (1986–87) ===
| No. overall | No. in season | Title | Directed by | Written by | Original release date | Prod. code | Rating/share (households) |
|---|---|---|---|---|---|---|---|
| 26 | 1 | "End of the Curse" | Terry Hughes | Susan Harris | September 27, 1986 | 026 | 25.6/45 |
| 27 | 2 | "Ladies of the Evening" | Terry Hughes | Barry Fanaro and Mort Nathan | October 4, 1986 | 027 | 27.3/47 |
| 28 | 3 | "Take Him, He's Mine" | Terry Hughes | Kathy Speer and Terry Grossman | October 11, 1986 | 028 | 24.6/40 |
| 29 | 4 | "It's a Miserable Life" | Terry Hughes | Barry Fanaro and Mort Nathan | November 1, 1986 | 034 | 25.0/43 |
| 30 | 5 | "Isn't It Romantic?" | Terry Hughes | Jeffrey Duteil | November 8, 1986 | 029 | 27.3/45 |
| 31 | 6 | "Big Daddy's Little Lady" | David Steinberg | Russell Marcus | November 15, 1986 | 035 | 25.3/42 |
| 32 | 7 | "Family Affair" | Terry Hughes | Winifred Hervey | November 22, 1986 | 036 | 26.8/43 |
| 33 | 8 | "Vacation" | Terry Hughes | Winifred Hervey | November 29, 1986 | 030 | 25.0/41 |
| 34 | 9 | "Joust Between Friends" | Terry Hughes | Scott Spencer Gordon | December 6, 1986 | 031 | 23.6/39 |
| 35 | 10 | "Love, Rose" | Terry Hughes | Kathy Speer and Terry Grossman | December 13, 1986 | 037 | 23.8/40 |
| 36 | 11 | "'Twas the Nightmare Before Christmas" | Terry Hughes | Barry Fanaro and Mort Nathan | December 20, 1986 | 038 | 23.5/41 |
| 37 | 12 | "The Sisters" | Terry Hughes | Christopher Lloyd | January 3, 1987 | 039 | 27.0/41 |
| 38 | 13 | "The Stan Who Came to Dinner" | Terry Hughes | Kathy Speer and Terry Grossman | January 10, 1987 | 041 | 26.6/41 |
| 39 | 14 | "The Actor" | Terry Hughes | Barry Fanaro and Mort Nathan | January 17, 1987 | 040 | 25.0/40 |
| 40 | 15 | "Before and After" | Terry Hughes | Bob Rosenfarb | January 24, 1987 | 032 | 26.4/42 |
| 41 | 16 | "And Then There Was One" | Terry Hughes | Russell Marcus | January 31, 1987 | 042 | 21.8/35 |
| 42 | 17 | "Bedtime Story" | Terry Hughes | Kathy Speer, Terry Grossman, Mort Nathan, and Barry Fanaro | February 7, 1987 | 043 | 24.1/39 |
| 43 | 18 | "Forgive Me, Father" | Terry Hughes | Kathy Speer and Terry Grossman | February 14, 1987 | 045 | 23.7/38 |
| 44 | 19 | "Long Day's Journey Into Marinara" | Terry Hughes | Barry Fanaro and Mort Nathan | February 21, 1987 | 046 | 24.5/41 |
| 45 | 20 | "Whose Face Is This, Anyway?" | Terry Hughes | Winifred Hervey | February 28, 1987 | 044 | 25.8/43 |
| 46 | 21 | "Dorothy's Prized Pupil" | Terry Hughes | Christopher Lloyd | March 14, 1987 | 033 | 23.8/38 |
| 47 | 22 | "Diamond in the Rough" | Terry Hughes | Jan Fischer and William Weidner | March 21, 1987 | 047 | 23.3/39 |
| 48 | 23 | "Son-in-Law Dearest" | Terry Hughes | Patt Shea and Harriet Weiss | April 11, 1987 | 048 | 23.0/38 |
| 49 | 24 | "To Catch a Neighbor" | Terry Hughes | Russell Marcus | May 2, 1987 | 049 | 19.5/36 |
| 50 | 25 | "A Piece of Cake" | Terry Hughes | Kathy Speer, Terry Grossman, Mort Nathan, and Barry Fanaro | May 9, 1987 | 050 | 19.2/37 |
| 51 | 26 | "Empty Nests" | Jay Sandrich | Susan Harris | May 16, 1987 | 051 | 17.8/34 |

=== Season 3 (1987–88) ===
| No. overall | No. in season | Title | Directed by | Written by | Original release date | Prod. code | Rating/share (households) |
|---|---|---|---|---|---|---|---|
| 52 | 1 | "Old Friends" | Terry Hughes | Kathy Speer and Terry Grossman | September 19, 1987 | 055 | 23.0/41 |
| 53 | 2 | "One for the Money" | Terry Hughes | Kathy Speer, Terry Grossman, Barry Fanaro, Mort Nathan, and Winifred Hervey Stallworth | September 26, 1987 | 057 | 22.3/40 |
| 54 | 3 | "Bringing Up Baby" | Terry Hughes | Barry Fanaro and Mort Nathan | October 3, 1987 | 052 | 24.4/44 |
| 55 | 4 | "The Housekeeper" | Terry Hughes | Winifred Hervey Stallworth | October 17, 1987 | 058 | 20.3/36 |
| 56 | 5 | "Nothing to Fear But Fear Itself" | Terry Hughes | Christopher Lloyd | October 24, 1987 | 056 | 24.2/43 |
| 57 | 6 | "Letter to Gorbachev" | Terry Hughes | Barry Fanaro and Mort Nathan | October 31, 1987 | 060 | 18.9/34 |
| 58 | 7 | "Strange Bedfellows" | Terry Hughes | Christopher Lloyd | November 7, 1987 | 054 | 23.1/41 |
| 59 | 8 | "Brotherly Love" | Terry Hughes | Jeffrey Ferro and Fredric Weiss | November 14, 1987 | 061 | 22.2/39 |
| 60 | 9 | "A Visit from Little Sven" | Terry Hughes | David Nichols | November 21, 1987 | 059 | 21.7/33 |
| 61 | 10 | "The Audit" | Terry Hughes | Winifred Hervey Stallworth | November 28, 1987 | 053 | 22.9/39 |
| 62 | 11 | "Three on a Couch" | Terry Hughes | Jeffrey Ferro and Fredric Weiss | December 5, 1987 | 064 | 23.7/41 |
| 63 | 12 | "Charlie's Buddy" | Terry Hughes | Kathy Speer and Terry Grossman | December 12, 1987 | 062 | 21.0/37 |
| 64 | 13 | "The Artist" | Terry Hughes | Christopher Lloyd | December 19, 1987 | 065 | 22.0/40 |
| 65 | 14 | "Blanche's Little Girl" | Terry Hughes | Kathy Speer and Terry Grossman | January 9, 1988 | 067 | 23.8/36 |
| 66 | 15 | "Dorothy's New Friend" | Terry Hughes | Robert Bruce and Martin Weiss | January 16, 1988 | 066 | 23.8/39 |
| 67 | 16 | "Grab That Dough" | Terry Hughes | Winifred Hervey Stallworth | January 23, 1988 | 063 | 21.9/36 |
| 68 | 17 | "My Brother, My Father" | Terry Hughes | Barry Fanaro and Mort Nathan | February 6, 1988 | 068 | 24.6/39 |
| 69 | 18 | "Golden Moments" | Terry Hughes | Story by : Kathy Speer and Terry Grossman; Teleplay by : Mort Nathan and Barry Fanaro | February 13, 1988 | 069 | 24.4/40 |
| 70 | 19 | "Golden Moments" | Terry Hughes | Story by : Kathy Speer and Terry Grossman; Teleplay by : Mort Nathan and Barry Fanaro | February 13, 1988 | 070 | 24.4/40 |
| 71 | 20 | "And Ma Makes Three" | Terry Hughes | Winifred Hervey Stallworth | February 20, 1988 | 071 | 18.0/28 |
| 72 | 21 | "Larceny and Old Lace" | Terry Hughes | Story by : Jeffrey Ferro and Fredric Weiss; Teleplay by : Robert Bruce and Martin Weiss | February 27, 1988 | 072 | 18.2/28 |
| 73 | 22 | "Rose's Big Adventure" | Terry Hughes | Jeff Abugov | March 12, 1988 | 075 | 21.4/36 |
| 74 | 23 | "Mixed Blessings" | Terry Hughes | Christopher Lloyd | March 19, 1988 | 073 | 22.5/38 |
| 75 | 24 | "Mister Terrific" | Terry Hughes | Kathy Speer and Terry Grossman | April 30, 1988 | 074 | 20.5/37 |
| 76 | 25 | "Mother's Day" | Terry Hughes | Story by : Kathy Speer and Terry Grossman; Teleplay by : Barry Fanaro and Mort Nathan | May 7, 1988 | 076 | 21.2/40 |

=== Season 4 (1988–89) ===
| No. overall | No. in season | Title | Directed by | Written by | Original release date | Prod. code | U.S. viewers (millions) |
|---|---|---|---|---|---|---|---|
| 77 | 1 | "Yes, We Have No Havanas" | Terry Hughes | Mort Nathan and Barry Fanaro | October 8, 1988 | 078 | 32.6 |
| 78 | 2 | "The Days and Nights of Sophia Petrillo" | Terry Hughes | Kathy Speer and Terry Grossman | October 22, 1988 | 077 | 28.7 |
| 79 | 3 | "The One That Got Away" | Terry Hughes | Christopher Lloyd | October 29, 1988 | 080 | 31.3 |
| 80 | 4 | "Yokel Hero" | Terry Hughes | Martin Weiss and Robert Bruce | November 5, 1988 | 081 | 34.5 |
| 81 | 5 | "Bang the Drum, Stanley" | Terry Hughes | Robert Bruce and Martin Weiss | November 12, 1988 | 079 | 33.1 |
| 82 | 6 | "Sophia's Wedding" | Terry Hughes | Barry Fanaro and Mort Nathan | November 19, 1988 | 082 | 35.7 |
| 83 | 7 | "Sophia's Wedding" | Terry Hughes | Barry Fanaro and Mort Nathan | November 26, 1988 | 083 | 38.2 |
| 84 | 8 | "Brother, Can You Spare That Jacket?" | Terry Hughes | Kathy Speer and Terry Grossman | December 3, 1988 | 084 | 34.5 |
| 85 | 9 | "Scared Straight" | Terry Hughes | Christopher Lloyd | December 10, 1988 | 086 | 34.2 |
| 86 | 10 | "Stan Takes a Wife" | Terry Hughes | Winifred Hervey-Stallworth | January 7, 1989 | 087 | 35.2 |
| 87 | 11 | "The Auction" | Terry Hughes | Eric Cohen | January 14, 1989 | 085 | 33.5 |
| 88 | 12 | "Blind Date" | Terry Hughes | Christopher Lloyd | January 28, 1989 | 089 | 32.8 |
| 89 | 13 | "The Impotence of Being Ernest" | Steve Zuckerman | Story by : Kevin Abbott; Teleplay by : Rick Copp and David A. Goodman | February 4, 1989 | 090 | 36.3 |
| 90 | 14 | "Love Me Tender" | Terry Hughes | Richard Vaczy and Tracy Gamble | February 6, 1989 | 088 | 34.8 |
| 91 | 15 | "Valentine's Day" | Terry Hughes | Kathy Speer, Terry Grossman, Barry Fanaro, and Mort Nathan | February 11, 1989 | 101 | 36.0 |
| 92 | 16 | "Two Rode Together" | Terry Hughes | Robert Bruce and Martin Weiss | February 18, 1989 | 091 | 34.9 |
| 93 | 17 | "You Gotta Have Hope" | Terry Hughes | Barry Fanaro and Mort Nathan | February 25, 1989 | 092 | 34.9 |
| 94 | 18 | "Fiddler on the Ropes" | Terry Hughes | Kathy Speer and Terry Grossman | March 4, 1989 | 093 | 35.9 |
| 95 | 19 | "Till Death Do We Volley" | Terry Hughes | Richard Vaczy and Tracy Gamble | March 18, 1989 | 096 | 30.8 |
| 96 | 20 | "High Anxiety" | Terry Hughes | Martin Weiss and Robert Bruce | March 25, 1989 | 097 | 31.1 |
| 97 | 21 | "Little Sister" | Terry Hughes | Christopher Lloyd | April 1, 1989 | 098 | 30.7 |
| 98 | 22 | "Sophia's Choice" | Terry Hughes | Richard Vaczy and Tracy Gamble | April 15, 1989 | 099 | 29.7 |
| 99 | 23 | "Rites of Spring" | Terry Hughes | Eric Cohen | April 29, 1989 | 102 | 27.8 |
| 100 | 24 | "Foreign Exchange" | Terry Hughes | Harriet B. Helberg and Sandy Helberg | May 6, 1989 | 100 | 29.3 |
| 101 | 25 | "We're Outta Here" | Terry Hughes | Barry Fanaro & Mort Nathan | May 13, 1989 | 094 | 30.2 |
| 102 | 26 | "We're Outta Here" | Terry Hughes | Kathy Speer & Terry Grossman | May 13, 1989 | 095 | 30.2 |

=== Season 5 (1989–90) ===
| No. overall | No. in season | Title | Directed by | Written by | Original release date | Prod. code | U.S. viewers (millions) |
|---|---|---|---|---|---|---|---|
| 103 | 1 | "Sick and Tired" | Terry Hughes | Susan Harris | September 23, 1989 | 103 | 34.8 |
| 104 | 2 | "Sick and Tired" | Terry Hughes | Susan Harris | September 30, 1989 | 104 | 34.8 |
| 105 | 3 | "Accurate Conception" | Terry Hughes | Gail Parent | October 14, 1989 | 105 | 28.4 |
| 106 | 4 | "Rose Fights Back" | Terry Hughes | Marc Sotkin | October 21, 1989 | 106 | 30.7 |
| 107 | 5 | "Love Under the Big Top" | Terry Hughes | Richard Vaczy and Tracy Gamble | October 28, 1989 | 108 | 28.8 |
| 108 | 6 | "Dancing in the Dark" | Terry Hughes | Phillip Jayson Lasker | November 4, 1989 | 110 | 31.0 |
| 109 | 7 | "Not Another Monday" | Terry Hughes | Gail Parent | November 11, 1989 | 109 | 32.2 |
| 110 | 8 | "That Old Feeling" | Terry Hughes | Tom Whedon | November 18, 1989 | 107 | 33.6 |
| 111 | 9 | "Comedy of Errors" | Terry Hughes | Don Reo | November 25, 1989 | 113 | 31.3 |
| 112 | 10 | "All That Jazz" | Terry Hughes | Robert Bruce and Martin Weiss | December 2, 1989 | 111 | 30.1 |
| 113 | 11 | "Ebb Tide" | Terry Hughes | Marc Sotkin | December 9, 1989 | 112 | 31.4 |
| 114 | 12 | "Have Yourself a Very Little Christmas" | Terry Hughes | Tom Whedon | December 16, 1989 | 115 | 31.2 |
| 115 | 13 | "Mary Has a Little Lamb" | Terry Hughes | Harold Apter | January 6, 1990 | 117 | 34.8 |
| 116 | 14 | "Great Expectations" | Terry Hughes | Robert Bruce and Martin Weiss | January 13, 1990 | 116 | 32.2 |
| 117 | 15 | "Triple Play" | Terry Hughes | Gail Parent | January 27, 1990 | 119 | 33.0 |
| 118 | 16 | "Clinton Avenue Memoirs" | Terry Hughes | Richard Vaczy & Tracy Gamble | February 3, 1990 | 114 | 32.4 |
| 119 | 17 | "Like the Beep Beep Beep of the Tom-Tom" | Terry Hughes | Phillip Jayson Lasker | February 10, 1990 | 120 | 31.0 |
| 120 | 18 | "An Illegitimate Concern" | Terry Hughes | Marc Cherry and Jamie Wooten | February 12, 1990 | 118 | 28.2 |
| 121 | 19 | "72 Hours" | Terry Hughes | Richard Vaczy and Tracy Gamble | February 17, 1990 | 121 | 31.3 |
| 122 | 20 | "Twice in a Lifetime" | Terry Hughes | Robert Bruce and Martin Weiss | February 24, 1990 | 122 | 32.1 |
| 123 | 21 | "Sisters and Other Strangers" | Terry Hughes | Marc Cherry and Jamie Wooten | March 3, 1990 | 123 | 31.0 |
| 124 | 22 | "Cheaters" | Terry Hughes | Tom Whedon | March 24, 1990 | 124 | 30.3 |
| 125 | 23 | "The Mangiacavallo Curse Makes a Lousy Wedding Present" | Terry Hughes | Phillip Jayson Lasker | March 31, 1990 | 125 | 30.0 |
| 126 | 24 | "All Bets Are Off" | Terry Hughes | Eugene B. Stein | April 28, 1990 | 126 | 22.4 |
| 127 | 25 | "The President's Coming! The President's Coming!" | Lex Passaris | Marc Sotkin, Gail Parent, Martin Weiss, Robert Bruce, Philip Jayson Lasker, Tom Whedon, Marc Cherry, and Jamie Wooten | May 5, 1990 | 127 | 24.1 |
| 128 | 26 | "The President's Coming! The President's Coming!" | Lex Passaris | Marc Sotkin, Gail Parent, Martin Weiss, Robert Bruce, Philip Jayson Lasker, Tom Whedon, Marc Cherry, and Jamie Wooten | May 5, 1990 | 128 | 24.1 |

=== Season 6 (1990–91) ===
| No. overall | No. in season | Title | Directed by | Written by | Original release date | Prod. code | U.S. viewers (millions) |
|---|---|---|---|---|---|---|---|
| 129 | 1 | "Blanche Delivers" | Matthew Diamond | Gail Parent and Jim Vallely | September 22, 1990 | 129 | 27.9 |
| 130 | 2 | "Once, in St. Olaf" | Matthew Diamond | Harold Apter | September 29, 1990 | 131 | 26.6 |
| 131 | 3 | "If At Last You Do Succeed" | Matthew Diamond | Robert Spina | October 6, 1990 | 132 | 25.4 |
| 132 | 4 | "Snap Out of It" | Matthew Diamond | Richard Vaczy and Tracy Gamble | October 13, 1990 | 130 | 24.5 |
| 133 | 5 | "Wham, Bam, Thank You, Mammy!" | Matthew Diamond | Marc Cherry and Jamie Wooten | October 20, 1990 | 133 | 21.7 |
| 134 | 6 | "Feelings" | Matthew Diamond | Don Seigel and Jerry Perzigian | October 27, 1990 | 134 | 24.6 |
| 135 | 7 | "Zborn Again" | Matthew Diamond | Mitchell Hurwitz | November 3, 1990 | 135 | 23.2 |
| 136 | 8 | "How Do You Solve a Problem Like Sophia?" | Matthew Diamond | Marc Cherry and Jamie Wooten | November 10, 1990 | 136 | 27.5 |
| 137 | 9 | "Mrs. George Devereaux" | Matthew Diamond | Richard Vaczy and Tracy Gamble | November 17, 1990 | 138 | 26.7 |
| 138 | 10 | "Girls Just Wanna Have Fun...Before They Die" | Matthew Diamond | Gail Parent and Jim Vallely | November 24, 1990 | 139 | 27.7 |
| 139 | 11 | "Stand By Your Man" | Matthew Diamond | Tom Whedon | December 1, 1990 | 137 | 23.1 |
| 140 | 12 | "Ebbtide's Revenge" | Matthew Diamond | Marc Sotkin | December 15, 1990 | 140 | 25.6 |
| 141 | 13 | "The Bloom Is Off the Rose" | Matthew Diamond | Phillip Jayson Lasker | January 5, 1991 | 142 | 27.2 |
| 142 | 14 | "Sister of the Bride" | Matthew Diamond | Marc Cherry and Jamie Wooten | January 12, 1991 | 141 | 29.8 |
| 143 | 15 | "Miles to Go" | Matthew Diamond | Don Seigel and Jerry Perzigian | January 19, 1991 | 145 | 23.3 |
| 144 | 16 | "There Goes the Bride" | Matthew Diamond | Story by : Gail Parent, Jim Vallely, and Mitchell Hurwitz; Teleplay by : Mitchell Hurwitz | February 2, 1991 | 143 | 26.3 |
| 145 | 17 | "There Goes the Bride" | Matthew Diamond | Gail Parent and Jim Vallely | February 9, 1991 | 144 | 26.4 |
| 146 | 18 | "Older and Wiser" | Matthew Diamond | Richard Vaczy and Tracy Gamble | February 16, 1991 | 146 | 17.4 |
| 147 | 19 | "Melodrama" | Matthew Diamond | Robert Spina | February 16, 1991 | 147 | 22.2 |
| 148 | 20 | "Even Grandmas Get the Blues" | Robert Berlinger | Gail Parent and Jim Vallely | March 2, 1991 | 149 | 23.8 |
| 149 | 21 | "Witness" | Zane Buzby | Mitchell Hurwitz | March 9, 1991 | 148 | 24.0 |
| 150 | 22 | "What a Difference a Date Makes" | Lex Passaris | Marc Cherry and Jamie Wooten | March 23, 1991 | 150 | 24.6 |
| 151 | 23 | "Love for Sale" | Peter D. Beyt | Don Seigel and Jerry Perzigian | April 6, 1991 | 151 | 22.0 |
| 152 | 24 | "Never Yell Fire in a Crowded Retirement Home" | Matthew Diamond | Story by : Gail Parent; Teleplay by : Tracy Gamble, Richard Vaczy, Tom Whedon, and Mitchell Hurwitz | April 27, 1991 | 153 | 21.0 |
| 153 | 25 | "Never Yell Fire in a Crowded Retirement Home" | Matthew Diamond | Story by : Jim Vallely; Teleplay by : Richard Vaczy, Tracy Gamble, Don Seigel, and Jerry Perzigian | April 27, 1991 | 154 | 21.0 |
| 154 | 26 | "Henny Penny — Straight, No Chaser" | Judy Pioli | Tom Whedon | May 4, 1991 | 152 | 22.0 |

=== Season 7 (1991–92) ===
| No. overall | No. in season | Title | Directed by | Written by | Original release date | Prod. code | U.S. viewers (millions) |
|---|---|---|---|---|---|---|---|
| 155 | 1 | "Hey, Look Me Over" | Lex Passaris | Mitchell Hurwitz | September 21, 1991 | 155 | 20.3 |
| 156 | 2 | "The Case of the Libertine Belle" | Lex Passaris | Tom Whedon | September 28, 1991 | 157 | 15.7 |
| 157 | 3 | "Beauty and the Beast" | Lex Passaris | Marc Cherry and Jamie Wooten | October 5, 1991 | 158 | 18.2 |
| 158 | 4 | "That's for Me to Know" | Lex Passaris | Kevin Abbott | October 12, 1991 | 159 | 19.2 |
| 159 | 5 | "Where's Charlie?" | Lex Passaris | Gail Parent and Jim Vallely | October 19, 1991 | 156 | 15.5 |
| 160 | 6 | "Mother Load" | Lex Passaris | Don Seigel and Jerry Perzigian | October 26, 1991 | 160 | 15.2 |
| 161 | 7 | "Dateline: Miami" | Peter D. Beyt | Marc Cherry and Jamie Wooten | November 2, 1991 | 163 | 18.7 |
| 162 | 8 | "The Monkey Show" | Lex Passaris | Mitchell Hurwitz and Marc Sotkin | November 9, 1991 | 161 | 24.7 |
| 163 | 9 | "The Monkey Show" | Lex Passaris | Mitchell Hurwitz and Marc Sotkin | November 9, 1991 | 162 | 24.7 |
| 164 | 10 | "Ro$e Love$ Mile$" | Lex Passaris | Don Seigel, Jerry Perzigian, Richard Vaczy, and Tracy Gamble | November 16, 1991 | 164 | 20.3 |
| 165 | 11 | "Room 7" | Peter D. Beyt | Tracy Gamble and Richard Vaczy | November 23, 1991 | 165 | 19.7 |
| 166 | 12 | "From Here to the Pharmacy" | Lex Passaris | Gail Parent and Jim Vallely | December 7, 1991 | 166 | 17.6 |
| 167 | 13 | "The Pope's Ring" | Lex Passaris | Kevin Abbott | December 14, 1991 | 167 | 16.6 |
| 168 | 14 | "Old Boyfriends" | Peter D. Beyt | Jamie Wooten and Marc Cherry | January 4, 1992 | 168 | 20.5 |
| 169 | 15 | "Goodbye, Mr. Gordon" | Lex Passaris | Gail Parent and Jim Vallely | January 11, 1992 | 169 | 19.8 |
| 170 | 16 | "The Commitments" | Lex Passaris | Tracy Gamble and Richard Vaczy | January 25, 1992 | 170 | 18.9 |
| 171 | 17 | "Questions and Answers" | Lex Passaris | Don Seigel and Jerry Perzigian | February 8, 1992 | 171 | 19.9 |
| 172 | 18 | "Ebbtide VI: The Wrath of Stan" | Lex Passaris | Marc Sotkin | February 15, 1992 | 172 | 16.0 |
| 173 | 19 | "Journey to the Center of Attention" | Lex Passaris | Jamie Wooten and Marc Cherry | February 22, 1992 | 173 | 17.8 |
| 174 | 20 | "A Midwinter Night's Dream" | Lex Passaris | Kevin Abbott | February 29, 1992 | 174 | 21.9 |
| 175 | 21 | "A Midwinter Night's Dream" | Lex Passaris | Tom Whedon | February 29, 1992 | 175 | 21.9 |
| 176 | 22 | "Rose: Portrait of a Woman" | Lex Passaris | Robert Spina | March 7, 1992 | 176 | 19.4 |
| 177 | 23 | "Home Again, Rose" | Peter D. Beyt | Gail Parent | April 25, 1992 | 177 | 17.7 |
| 178 | 24 | "Home Again, Rose" | Peter D. Beyt | Gail Parent | May 2, 1992 | 178 | 20.0 |
| 179 | 25 | "One Flew Out of the Cuckoo's Nest" | Lex Passaris | Don Seigel and Jerry Perzigian | May 9, 1992 | 179 | 27.2 |
| 180 | 26 | "One Flew Out of the Cuckoo's Nest" | Lex Passaris | Mitchell Hurwitz | May 9, 1992 | 180 | 27.2 |

== Television special ==
| Title | Directed by | Written by | Original release date |
|---|---|---|---|
| The Golden Girls: Their Greatest Moments | Andrew Solt | Andrew Solt, Greg Vines | June 2, 2003 |
Bea Arthur, Rue McClanahan and Betty White host a Golden Girls retrospective featuring a montage of clips from their favorite episodes and musical moments from the show, never-before-seen bloopers and outtakes, as well as interviews with executive producers Paul Junger Witt and Tony Thomas, and creator/writer Susan Harris. Estelle Getty was unable to participate due to failing health. This special aired not on NBC, but on the Lifetime cable channel, which was running reruns of the series at the time.

== Ratings ==
The Golden Girls : U.S. viewers per episode (millions)

| Season | Episode number | | | | | | | | | | | | | | | | | | | | | | | | | |
| Season | 1 | 2 | 3 | 4 | 5 | 6 | 7 | 8 | 9 | 10 | 11 | 12 | 13 | 14 | 15 | 16 | 17 | 18 | 19 | 20 | 21 | 22 | 23 | 24 | 25 | 26 |
|---|---|---|---|---|---|---|---|---|---|---|---|---|---|---|---|---|---|---|---|---|---|---|---|---|---|---|
| 1 | 25.0 | 22.5 | 19.0 | 21.8 | 18.6 | 18.6 | 19.6 | 19.0 | 23.2 | 23.6 | 23.2 | 20.3 | 21.9 | 19.3 | 24.0 | 24.2 | 22.8 | 21.5 | 21.7 | 25.2 | 24.6 | 22.3 | 21.8 | 21.7 | 19.9 | – |
| 2 | 25.6 | 27.3 | 24.6 | 25.0 | 27.3 | 25.3 | 26.8 | 25.0 | 23.6 | 23.8 | 23.5 | 27.0 | 26.6 | 25.0 | 26.4 | 21.8 | 24.1 | 23.7 | 24.5 | 25.8 | 23.8 | 23.3 | 23.0 | 19.5 | 19.2 | 17.8 |
| 3 | 23.0 | 22.3 | 24.4 | 20.3 | 24.2 | 18.9 | 23.1 | 22.2 | 21.7 | 22.9 | 23.7 | 21.0 | 22.0 | 23.8 | 23.8 | 21.9 | 24.6 | 24.4 | 24.4 | 18.0 | 18.2 | 21.4 | 22.5 | 20.5 | 21.2 | – |
| 4 | 32.6 | 28.7 | 31.3 | 34.5 | 33.1 | 35.7 | 38.2 | 34.5 | 34.2 | 35.2 | 33.5 | 32.8 | 36.3 | 34.8 | 36.0 | 34.9 | 34.9 | 35.9 | 30.8 | 31.1 | 30.7 | 29.7 | 27.8 | 29.3 | 30.2 | 30.2 |
| 5 | 34.8 | 34.8 | 28.4 | 30.7 | 28.8 | 31.0 | 32.2 | 33.6 | 31.3 | 30.1 | 31.4 | 31.2 | 34.8 | 32.2 | 33.0 | 32.4 | 31.0 | 28.2 | 31.3 | 32.1 | 31.0 | 30.3 | 30.0 | 22.4 | 24.1 | 24.1 |
| 6 | 27.9 | 26.6 | 25.4 | 24.5 | 21.7 | 24.6 | 23.2 | 27.5 | 26.7 | 27.7 | 23.1 | 25.6 | 27.2 | 29.8 | 23.3 | 26.3 | 26.4 | 17.4 | 22.2 | 23.8 | 24.0 | 24.6 | 22.0 | 21.0 | 21.0 | 22.0 |
| 7 | 20.3 | 15.7 | 18.2 | 19.2 | 15.5 | 15.2 | 18.7 | 24.7 | 24.7 | 20.3 | 19.7 | 17.6 | 16.6 | 20.5 | 19.8 | 18.9 | 19.9 | 16.0 | 17.8 | 21.9 | 21.9 | 19.4 | 17.7 | 20.0 | 27.2 | 27.2 |

Audience measurement performed by Nielsen Media Research
