= 10% solution =

10% solution may refer to:

- A solution (chemistry) with concentration 10%
- Northwest Territorial Imperative, white supremacist proposal
- The 10% Solution for a Healthy Life, 1993 book by Ray Kurzweil
