= Kingpin (1996 film) =

1996 US sports comedy film by Peter and Bobby Farrelly

- Theatrical release poster
- Directed by: Peter Farrelly; Bobby Farrelly
- Written by: Barry Fanaro; Mort Nathan
- Produced by: Brad Krevoy; Steve Stabler; Bradley Thomas
- Starring: Woody Harrelson; Randy Quaid; Vanessa Angel; Bill Murray
- Cinematography: Mark Irwin
- Edited by: Christopher Greenbury
- Music by: Freedy Johnston
- Production companies: Metro-Goldwyn-Mayer; Motion Picture Corporation of America; Rysher Entertainment
- Distributed by: MGM/UA Distribution Co.
- Release date: July 26, 1996
- Running time: 114 minutes
- Country: United States
- Language: English
- Budget: $25 million
- Box office: $32.2 million

Kingpin is a 1996 American sports comedy film directed by Peter Farrelly and Bobby Farrelly and written by Barry Fanaro and Mort Nathan. The film stars Woody Harrelson, Randy Quaid, Vanessa Angel, and Bill Murray. The film's plot follows Roy Munson (Harrelson), a former bowling prodigy whose career is cut short after he loses his hand, and his attempt to return to the sport by managing Ishmael (Quaid), a talented Amish bowler.

The film was shot primarily in and around Pittsburgh, which stood in for locations including Scranton, Pennsylvania Dutch Country, and Reno, Nevada.

Released by MGM/UA Distribution Co. on July 26, 1996, it grossed $32.2 million worldwide against a production budget of $25 million. Kingpin received mixed reviews from critics upon release, with criticism focused on its reliance on crude and mean-spirited comedy.

== Plot ==
In 1979, in Ocelot, Iowa, bowling prodigy Roy Munson leaves home to pursue a professional career. In his debut, he defeats narcissistic pro bowler Ernie McCracken. Seeking revenge, McCracken convinces Roy to help him hustle local amateur bowlers for extra cash. When their scheme is discovered, McCracken escapes, leaving Roy behind with their victims, who destroy Roy's bowling hand in a ball return, ending his career.

Seventeen years later, in Scranton, Pennsylvania, Roy is a cynical, scheming alcoholic who wears a prosthetic rubber hand, and whose surname has become synonymous with failure and squandered potential. At a bowling alley, Roy meets naive Ishmael Boorg, a member of the local Amish community. Roy immediately recognizes Ishmael's bowling talent and offers to help him turn professional, but Ishmael declines, as his community frowns on his hobby. After Roy is forced to have sex with his elderly landlady to pay his rent, he sees an advertisement for a bowling tournament in Reno, Nevada, offering a $1 million prize. Roy infiltrates Ishmael's community to convince him to enter the tournament—he agrees after learning his family's farm is going to be seized by the bank.

Under Roy's coaching, Ishmael improves rapidly, and the pair earn money through local tournaments and hustles, including defeating wealthy bowling enthusiast Stanley Osmanski. Stanley assaults his girlfriend, Claudia, after she mocks his loss, and threatens to kill Roy for using counterfeit money to bet on their game. Roy, Ishmael, and Claudia flee, journeying together towards Reno. Roy and Claudia develop a combative relationship, each accusing the other of exploiting Ishmael. Their hostility escalates into a fistfight, during which Ishmael runs away.

While searching for him, Roy and Claudia drive through Ocelot. The pair bond after Roy confesses that he never returned to his hometown—not even for his father's funeral—out of shame for failing to live up to his father's expectations. They eventually find Ishmael, rescuing him from forced servitude as an exotic dancer.

In Reno, the trio encounters McCracken, now a national bowling superstar. McCracken reveals a past relationship with Claudia and mocks Roy, provoking Ishmael, who breaks his bowling hand attempting to punch him. Later, Stanley confronts Claudia, and she leaves with him, taking all the money the trio earned during their journey. Ishmael convinces Roy to take his place in the tournament. Using his rubber hand, Roy gradually regains his confidence and wins the crowd's support, earning the nickname "The Rubber Man." He advances to the televised finals against McCracken, but Ishmael's brother arrives to take him home. Left alone, Roy is devastated when McCracken wins the tournament by a single pin.

Days later, Stanley confronts Roy, claiming that Claudia has run off with his money and has been calling McCracken repeatedly. Roy denies any involvement with McCracken, whom he had blamed for his failures, but now accepts that he is responsible for the loss of his hand and the state of his life. Stanley leaves to find McCracken.

Some time later, Roy has returned home and stopped drinking alcohol. Claudia arrives and explains that she left with Stanley to stop him from pursuing Roy and Ishmael, then led him after McCracken, hoping to get some revenge. She confesses her feelings for Roy, who reveals that although he lost the tournament, he earned $500,000 from an endorsement deal with Trojan condoms as "The Rubber Man." They visit Ishmael's family and recount the moral strength and decency he showed throughout their journey—qualities that helped change them for the better. Roy gifts his earnings to the Boorgs to save their farm before driving off with Claudia.

== Cast ==
- Woody Harrelson as Roy Munson, the 1979 Iowa State Amateur Bowling Champion and a bowling prodigy. Munson loses his right hand after being caught in a hustle and abandoned by Ernie McCracken. He spends the next seventeen years as a down-on-his-luck alcoholic before meeting Ishmael.
  - Will Rothhaar as young Roy
- Randy Quaid as Ishmael Boorg, an Amish man struggling to find his place among his people. He meets Roy after sneaking out to go bowling and decides to accompany Roy to Reno in a quest to save his home from foreclosure.
- Vanessa Angel as Claudia, a beautiful woman who was dating Stanley until he physically abused her. She joins Ishmael and Roy and helps them earn the money they need to travel to Reno.
- Bill Murray as Ernie "Big Ern" McCracken, Munson's arch-enemy. McCracken convinces the naive Munson to help him scam other bowlers but abandons Munson to face the consequences.
- Lin Shaye as Mrs. Dumars, Roy's elderly landlady.
- Rob Moran as Stanley Osmanski, Claudia's ex-boyfriend. He pursues Claudia, Roy, and Ishmael across the country trying to get revenge for losing Claudia.
- Chris Elliott as the gambler
- Chris Schenkel as himself
- Morganna, the Kissing Bandit as herself
- P. W. Evans as himself

Cast notes:

- Major league baseball pitcher Roger Clemens appears in a cameo as the character Skidmark during the restaurant scene.
- Professional bowlers Parker Bohn III, Randy Pedersen, Justin Hromek and Mark Roth appear as opponents that Roy Munson defeats on his way to the final match in Reno against McCracken.
- The film also features several musical acts. Jonathan Richman — who would play an even bigger musical role in the Farrelly brothers' next film There's Something About Mary — fronts the band performing in the restaurant scene. Urge Overkill performs the national anthem at the tournament in Reno, while John Popper appears as the master of ceremony. In the film's end credits, Popper and his band Blues Traveler perform their song "But Anyway" while dressed in traditional Amish clothing.
- According to the Farrelly brothers, Michael Keaton, Chris Farley and Charles Rocket were considered for the roles played by Harrelson, Quaid and Murray respectively. Jim Carrey was the first choice for the role of Ernie McCracken.

== Reception ==
=== Box office ===
Kingpin was released in the United States and Canada on July 26, 1996. During its opening weekend it grossed a total of $5.6 million from 1,956 theaters—an average of $2,853 per theater—making it the fifth-highest grossing film of the weekend, behind Courage Under Fire ($5.7 million) in its third week of release, and ahead of Supercop ($5.5 million) in its first. In its second weekend, Kingpin fell to the number 6 position with a $4.5 million gross—a 19.3% drop from the previous week—placing it behind Phenomenon ($5.1 million), in its fifth weekend, and ahead of Courage Under Fire ($4.45 million). In its third weekend, Kingpin fell to the number 10 position with a $2.86 million gross, placing it behind The Nutty Professor ($2.9 million), in its seventh weekend, and ahead of Twister ($1.6 million), in its fourteenth. Kingpin left the top ten highest-grossing films by its fourth weekend.

In total, Kingpin grossed $25 million in the United States and Canada, making it the 72nd-highest-grossing film of 1996. Outside of the United States and Canada, Kingpin is estimated to have grossed a further $7.2 million, giving it a worldwide gross of $32.2 million, and making it the 65th-highest-grossing film of the year.

=== Critical response ===
On the review aggregator website Rotten Tomatoes, 53% of 40 critics' reviews are positive, with an average rating of 5.8/10. The website's consensus reads: "Kingpin has its moments, but they're often offset by an eagerness to descend into vulgar mean-spiritedness." Metacritic, which uses a weighted average, assigned the film a score of 43 out of 100, based on 14 critics, indicating "mixed or average" reviews. Audiences polled by CinemaScore gave the film a grade of "B−" on a scale of A+ to F.

Roger Ebert of The Chicago Sun-Times had one of the more noteworthy positive reviews, giving Kingpin three and a half stars out of a possible four. He wrote that not all the jokes worked, but those that did were exceptionally funny because "you can’t see a lot of the laughs coming." Gene Siskel of The Chicago Tribune also endorsed the film, putting it on his list of the ten best films for 1996.

Nancy Gerstman mentioned the film as one of the nine most underrated films in the 1990s.

In 2018, Vulture.com listed it at #2 on a list of Woody Harrelson's best films.

== Home media ==
When released on DVD, Kingpin came in its original PG-13 theatrical version (113 minutes) and an extended, R-rated version (117 minutes).

Both versions are available on the Blu-ray disc issued by Paramount Pictures on October 14, 2014.

Kino Lorber released the 4K Ultra HD Blu-ray on May 27, 2025.
