= The Secret Diary of Desmond Pfeiffer =

American sitcom

- From left to right: Nibblet, Desmond Pfeiffer, Abraham Lincoln, Mary Todd Lincoln
- Genre: Sitcom
- Created by: Barry Fanaro; Mort Nathan
- Written by: Marc Abrams; Mike Benson; Bill Boulware; Barry Fanaro; Jim Gerkin; Mort Nathan; Brian Pollack; Mert Rich
- Directed by: Matthew Diamond
- Starring: Chi McBride; Dann Florek; Christine Estabrook; Max Baker; Kelly Connell
- Composers: Rich Eames; Scott Gale
- Country of origin: United States
- Original language: English
- No. of seasons: 1
- No. of episodes: 9 (5 unaired)

Production
- Executive producers: Barry Fanaro; Mort Nathan
- Producer: Marica Govons
- Cinematography: George La Fountaine Sr.
- Editor: Mike Wilcox
- Running time: 22–24 minutes
- Production companies: Fanaro-Nathan Productions; Paramount Television

Original release
- Network: UPN
- Release: October 5 – October 26, 1998

The Secret Diary of Desmond Pfeiffer (/pəˈfaɪfər/ pə-FY-fər) is an American sitcom that aired on UPN from October 5 to October 26, 1998. Before it even debuted, the series set off a storm of controversy because of a perceived light-hearted take on the issue of American slavery.

== Story ==
A Black English nobleman named Desmond Pfeiffer, chased out of the United Kingdom due to gambling debts, becomes President Abraham Lincoln's valet. In the show, he serves as the intelligent and erudite backbone of a Civil War-era White House populated by louts and drunkards.

== Cast ==
- Chi McBride as Desmond Pfeiffer, Black English gentleman serving as President Lincoln's butler
- Dann Florek as Abraham Lincoln, 16th President of the United States
- Christine Estabrook as Mary Todd Lincoln, President Lincoln's wife
- Max Baker as Nibblet, Pfeiffer's assistant
- Kelly Connell as Ulysses S. Grant, general of the United States Army

== Controversy ==
Before the series' premiere, several African-American activist groups, including the Los Angeles Chapter of the NAACP, protested against the premise of the series. On September 24, 1998, a protest against the series was held outside Paramount Studios. Five days later, UPN released a statement regarding the controversy and stated that the network planned on delaying the controversial pilot episode (which never aired) and would instead air an alternate episode in its place.

== Ratings ==
The first episode of the series aired on October 5, 1998, ranking 116th out of 125 television programs for that week. Desmond Pfeiffer was removed from UPN's schedule on October 24, and after airing one episode two days after being removed from UPN's lineup, was cancelled, thus hastening the demise of UPN president Dean Valentine's career.

== Reception ==
David Hofstede rated the show one of the "100 Dumbest Events in Television History", but pointed out that despite the protests, the show did not portray slaves and did not employ racial humor. Instead, it was intended as a critique of Bill Clinton and the Monica Lewinsky scandal, with the sexual world of the Oval Office played for laughs. Hofstede considered the sexual humor juvenile, but found the racially sensitive backlash even "dumber."

It was ranked #5 on Entertainment Weekly's Top 50 TV Bombs.

== In popular culture ==
The series was alluded to in the unaired pilot episode of Clerks: The Animated Series, "Leonardo Leonardo Returns and Dante Has an Important Decision to Make," which featured Dante and Randal encountering a Haunted Mansion-like ride inspired by The Secret Diary of Desmond Pfeiffer.

== Episodes ==
No.	Title	Directed by	Written by	Original release date	US viewers (millions)
1	"A.O.L.: Abe On-Line"	Matthew Diamond	Jim Gerkin	October 5, 1998	2.06
Lincoln engages in "telegraph sex" with a woman he's never seen.
2	"Up, Up and Away"	Matthew Diamond	Marc Abrams & Michael Benson	October 12, 1998	1.89
Desmond, Nibblet, and the President wind up trapped behind enemy lines after a freak accident with an observation balloon, and President Lincoln must dress in drag to escape Confederate territory. Meanwhile, General Grant tries sobriety. Guest stars: Curtis Armstrong and Sherman Hemsley
3	"Saving Mr. Lincoln"	Matthew Diamond	Brian Pollack & Mert Rich	October 19, 1998	1.58
When Lincoln falls ill before a meeting with Queen Victoria, Mary Todd decides to hire a body double to impersonate the president. Little does the body double know that she's got another use in mind for him.
4	"Once Upon a Mistress"	Matthew Diamond	Bill Boulware	October 26, 1998	1.68
When foreign dignitaries bring their mistresses to visit, President Lincoln finds temptation in a gift from a foreign dignitary. Meanwhile, Nibblet concocts a tonic for Mary's migraines.
5	"Pilot"	N/A	N/A	Unaired	N/A
After managing to get himself hired as President Lincoln's butler, Desmond Pfeiffer schemes to return to his native England.
6	"Pigeon English"	N/A	N/A	Unaired	N/A
7	"Kidnapped"	N/A	N/A	Unaired	N/A
When Confederate soldiers kidnap Mrs. Lincoln, Grant retaliates by kidnapping Robert E. Lee's wife.
8	"School Daze"	N/A	N/A	Unaired	N/A
9	"Guess Who's Coming to Dinner"	N/A	N/A	Unaired	N/A

== See also ==
- Abraham Lincoln cultural depictions
- 1998 in television
