= Platypus Man =

1995 American sitcom TV series

- Genre: Sitcom
- Created by: Barry Fanaro; Mort Nathan
- Directed by: Dick Brown; Andy Cadiff
- Starring: Richard Jeni; Ron Orbach; Denise Miller; David Dundara
- Composers: Rich Eames; Scott Gale
- Country of origin: United States
- Original language: English
- No. of seasons: 1
- No. of episodes: 13

Production
- Executive producers: Barry Fanaro; Mort Nathan
- Producers: Michael Davidoff; Marica Govons; Bill Rosenthal; Michael Rotenberg
- Cinematography: Frank Raymond
- Editors: Robert Bramwell; Richard Rodono
- Running time: 30 mins. (approx)
- Production companies: Fanaro-Nathan Productions; Paramount Television

Original release
- Network: UPN
- Release: January 23 – May 15, 1995

Platypus Man is an American sitcom that aired on UPN from January 23 to May 15, 1995, during the network's first season. Starring comedian Richard Jeni, the television series was based on an hour-long HBO special of Jeni's filmed in 1992. The series lasted one season, with a total of thirteen episodes.

Platypus Man premiered January 23, 1995. The concept of a "Platypus Man" (a solitary male, like the male platypus), the concept of a "cooking show for guys" and the scenes involving the main character's social life were drawn from Jeni's stand-up routines.

The show, paired with Pig Sty, followed Star Trek: Voyager on UPN's Monday schedule. Both Pig Sty and Platypus Man were canceled in July 1995.

== Origin ==
In the early 1990s, Jeni developed a comedy routine where he watched a National Geographic special on the platypus. In the routine, Jeni went on to describe how he found himself relating to the TV show, and the concept of a "platypus man" was expanded to become the theme behind Jeni's 1992 HBO comedy special.

The HBO special was taped in 1992 at the Park West Theater in Chicago, Illinois and covered topics such as news ("the bad news"), sports (including Jeni's "NFL Football Referee" routine), politics, music and sex. Executive producers on the project were Richard Jeni and Michael Rotenberg, it was produced by Tom Bull and Sandy Chandley, and post-production was handled by Steve Sharp and Juniper Recording Studios.

The set design for the special was created by Norm Dodge and included a checkered tile floor, a backdrop with painted-on palm trees, a refrigerator and microwave at one end of the stage (provided by Aronson Furniture, for a comedic bit entitled "Bill the Belching Gourmet"), and a black sofa at the other end of the stage. This design was reproduced in clay for the opening sequence of Platypus Man, in which art director Rick Toone of D&K Group/Claymagic used the process of claymation to introduce the show with the help of a duck-billed clay version of Richard Jeni and footage from the platypus exhibit at Taronga Zoo in Sydney.

The live-action portions of the opening sequence were shot inside and outside of Jeni's house in the Hollywood Hills (in the bedroom, bathroom, hallway, driveway, balcony and pool area) and on the streets of West Hollywood, California. The song "Platypus Man" that opened and closed the special was created with the combined efforts of Scott May, Richard Jeni, and fellow comedian Rondell Sheridan and sung in a blues-like voice by Jeni.

== Synopsis ==
In the series, Jeni played a fictitious version of himself and was host of a cooking show called Cooking with the Platypus Man. Ron Orbach played Lou, executive producer of his cooking show and his best friend since childhood. Denise Miller played Paige, his sportswriter neighbor. David Dundara played Tommy, his bartending younger brother.

== Cast ==
- Richard Jeni as Himself
- David Dundara as Tommy Jeni
- Denise Miller as Paige McAllister
- Ron Orbach as Lou Golembiewski

== Episodes ==
No.	Title	Directed by	Written by	Original release date	Prod. code
1	"Pilot"	Andy Cadiff	Barry Fanaro and Mort Nathan	January 23, 1995	001
2	"9½ Days"	Gary Brown	Michael Davidoff and Bill Rosenthal	January 30, 1995	002
3	"The Apartment Show"	Gary Brown	Marc Sotkin	February 6, 1995	003
4	"NYPD Nude"	Andy Cadiff	Barry Fanaro and Mort Nathan	February 13, 1995	004
5	"Sweet Denial"	Gary Brown	Gail Parent	February 20, 1995	005
6	"New York on $2,000 a Day"	Gary Brown	Michael Davidoff and Bill Rosenthal	February 27, 1995	006
7	"Lou's the Boss"	Gary Brown	Jonathan Aibel and Glenn Berger	March 6, 1995	008
8	"The Crush"	Gary Brown	Mary Ann Barnes and Sheila Barnes	March 13, 1995	009
9	"Both Sides Now"	Gary Brown	Danny Smith	March 20, 1995	010
10	"Without a Hitch"	Gary Brown	Jonathan Aibel and Glenn Berger	April 10, 1995	007
11	"Lower East Side Story"	Gary Brown	Bill Prady	May 1, 1995	011
12	"Out of the Mouths of Babes"	Gary Brown	Billiam Coronel and Robert Bruce	May 8, 1995	012
13	"Dying to Live"	Gary Brown	Marc Sotkin and Gail Parent	May 15, 1995	013
