= Picket Fences =

American family drama television series (1992–1996)

- Genre: Family drama Legal drama
- Created by: David E. Kelley
- Starring: Tom Skerritt; Kathy Baker; Costas Mandylor; Lauren Holly; Holly Marie Combs; Justin Shenkarow; Adam Wylie; Zelda Rubinstein; Fyvush Finkel; Ray Walston; Kelly Connell; Don Cheadle
- Opening theme: "Picket Fences" by Stewart Levin
- Country of origin: United States
- Original language: English
- No. of seasons: 4
- No. of episodes: 89 (list of episodes)

Production
- Executive producers: David E. Kelley (seasons 1–3); Alice West
- Running time: 42 minutes
- Production companies: David E. Kelley Productions; 20th Century Fox Television (Note: Known as 20th Television from 1992 to 1994.)

Original release
- Network: CBS
- Release: September 18, 1992 – June 26, 1996

Related
- Chicago Hope

Picket Fences is an American family drama television series about the residents of the town of Rome, Wisconsin, created and produced by David E. Kelley. The show ran from September 18, 1992, to June 26, 1996, on CBS in the United States. It occasionally struggled to maintain a stable primetime audience and had fluctuating ratings, due in part to its Friday night death slot. In its first season on the air, it placed 63rd in prime-time Nielsen ratings and in its second season it moved to 61st. Nonetheless, the show won critical acclaim and was a major awards winner, winning 14 Primetime Emmy Awards during its run, and is now regarded as a cult classic. The show's exteriors were shot in the Los Angeles suburb of Monrovia, California.

== Overview ==
The series follows the lives of the residents of the small town of Rome, Wisconsin, where weird things happen, including cows' udders exploding and people turning up dead in freezers. The show dealt with unusual topics for the primetime television of the period, such as abortion, incest, homophobia and LGBT adoption, transsexuality, racism, belief in God, ethics in medicine, polygamy, polyamory, adolescent sexuality, date rape, cryonics, the Holocaust, shoe fetishism, masturbation, animal sacrifice, spontaneous human combustion, and constitutional rights. Illustrative of the subject matter is that the regular cast included a judge, two lawyers, and a medical examiner. Religious issues were frequently discussed, and the town's Catholic and Episcopal priests were frequently recurring characters, as well as lawyer Douglas Wambaugh's relationships in his local Jewish temple.

Struggling to maintain order in the community is Sheriff Jimmy Brock (Tom Skerritt). Sheriff Brock is 52 years old, married to the town doctor, Jill (Kathy Baker), his second wife. They raise their three children, Kimberly (Holly Marie Combs) from Jimmy's first marriage to Lydia Brock (Cristine Rose), Matthew (Justin Shenkarow) and Zachary (Adam Wylie).

Maxine 'Max' Stewart (Lauren Holly) and Kenny Lacos (Costas Mandylor) are impulsive and slightly immature sheriff's deputies. Kelly Connell played medical examiner Carter Pike (who regularly begged to be deputized) and Zelda Rubinstein portrayed police dispatcher Ginny Weedon.

Bombastic lawyer Douglas Wambaugh (Fyvush Finkel) usually irritated Judge Henry Bone (Ray Walston). Wambaugh refused to hear any confessions of guilt from his clients as he feared that it would only stand in the way of adequately defending them in court; and Bone's rulings seemed to be directed more by his own moral compass than by points of law, though his decisions were almost never reversed. After several prosecutors came and went, Don Cheadle joined the cast as John Littleton.

Other actors who were in the cast included Marlee Matlin as Mayor Laurie Bey / The Dancing Bandit, Richard Masur as Ed Lawson, Roy Brocksmith as elementary school principal Michael Oslo, Jack Murdock as ethically challenged city councilman Harold Lundstrom, Roy Dotrice as Father Gary Barrett, a Catholic priest, and Dabbs Greer as the Reverend Henry Novotny, priest of the local Episcopal church.

== Cast ==
Actor	Character	Seasons			
Actor	Character	1	2	3	4
Main characters
Tom Skerritt	Jimmy Brock	Main	Main	Main	Main
Kathy Baker	Jill Brock	Main	Main	Main	Main
Lauren Holly	Maxine Stewart	Main	Main	Main	Main
Costas Mandylor	Kenny Lacos	Main	Main	Main	Main
Holly Marie Combs	Kimberly Brock	Main	Main	Main	Main
Justin Shenkarow	Matthew Brock	Main	Main	Main	Main
Adam Wylie	Zachary Brock	Main	Main	Main	Main
Fyvush Finkel	Douglas Wambaugh	Recurring	Main	Main	Main
Kelly Connell	Carter Pike	Recurring	Main	Main	Main
Zelda Rubinstein	Ginny Weedon	Main	Main		
Don Cheadle	John Littleton		Recurring	Main	Main
Marlee Matlin	Laurie Bey		Guest	Main	Main
Ray Walston	Henry Bone	Recurring	Main	Main	Main
Recurring characters
Dabbs Greer	Reverend Henry Novotny	Recurring	Recurring	Recurring	Recurring
Roy Dotrice	Father Gary Barrett	Recurring	Recurring	Recurring	Recurring
Roy Brocksmith	Michael Oslo	Recurring	Recurring	Recurring	Recurring
Denis Arndt	Franklin Dell	Recurring	Recurring	Recurring	Recurring
Sam Anderson	Donald Morrell	Recurring	Recurring	Recurring	
Michael Keenan	Bill Pugen	Recurring	Recurring		
Robert Cornthwaite	Howard Buss	Recurring	Recurring		
Elisabeth Moss	Cynthia Parks	Recurring	Recurring	Recurring	
Leigh Taylor-Young	Rachel Harris		Recurring	Recurring	
Paul Eiding	Jason Steinberg		Recurring	Recurring	
Richard Masur	Ed Lawson		Guest	Recurring	
Amy Aquino	Joanna Diamond				Recurring
Matthew Glave	Bud Skeeter				Recurring

== Episodes ==
=== Series overview ===
Season	Episodes	Originally released	
Season	Episodes	First released	Last released
1	23	September 18, 1992	May 6, 1993
2	22	October 22, 1993	May 13, 1994
3	22	September 23, 1994	May 12, 1995
4	22	September 22, 1995	June 26, 1996

=== Crossovers ===
The series has two crossover episodes with another David E. Kelley series, Chicago Hope, one occurring in each series. In the first, on Picket Fences, Dr. Jill Brock accompanies Douglas Wambaugh to Chicago Hope Hospital over concerns of his heart. In the second, Wambaugh is back at Chicago Hope Hospital causing trouble for the doctors.

Lauren Holly later joined the cast of Chicago Hope as Dr. Jeremy Hanlon and Tom Skerritt and Kathy Baker appeared in different roles as guest stars.

Show	Episode #	Episode Name	Airdate
Picket Fences	3–7	"Rebels with Causes"	November 11, 1994
Chicago Hope	1–13	"Small Sacrifices"	January 23, 1995

David E. Kelley and Chris Carter (creator of The X-Files) were talking in a parking lot on the Fox lot one day and thought it might be interesting to have Mulder and Scully visit Rome, Wisconsin for an X-Files episode. Originally, the two shows would be shot with different viewpoints – one from the X-Files perspective and the other from Picket Fences'. The official approval was never given by Fox and CBS, so the only remnants remaining of this effort are the X-Files episode "Red Museum" and the Picket Fences episode "Away in the Manger" having similar plotlines involving cows. Every reference to Picket Fences has been purged from the X-Files episode, but there still are some small details left in the Picket Fences episode referring to the happenings at The X-Files and some minor characters there.

== Ratings ==
Season		U.S. ratings	Network	Rank
1	1992-93	9.49 million	CBS	#63
2	1993-94	9.49 million	CBS	#61
3	1994-95	9.50 million	CBS	#64
4	1995-96	7.00 million	CBS	#98

== Adaptation ==
The series was adapted in India in Hindi language and aired on StarPlus as Kehta Hai Dil from 2002 to 2005 produced by UTV Software Communications. However, the Indian version in between deviated entirely from the story of Picket Fences.

== Home media ==
On June 19, 2007, 20th Century Fox Home Entertainment released the first season of Picket Fences on DVD in Region 1. In the United States, the entire series was available to stream on Hulu from Thanksgiving 2021 to Thanksgiving 2023. On August 20, 2014, Season 1 was released in Australia. Season 2 was released in Australia in December 2014. Season 3 was released in Australia in March 2016.

== Awards and nominations ==
Picket Fences won fourteen Emmy Awards (including "Outstanding Drama Series" twice) and one Golden Globe Award in its four-year run. In 1997, the episode "Heart of Saturday Night" was ranked #96 on TV Guide's 100 Greatest Episodes of All-Time. In 2002, the character of Douglas Wambaugh was ranked 47th on TV Guide's 50 Greatest Television Characters of All Time list.
