= John Bishop (screenwriter) =

American playwright and screenwriter

- Born: May 3, 1929; Mansfield, Ohio
- Died: December 20, 2006 (aged 77); Bad Heilbrunn, Germany
- Occupation: Writer

John Bishop (May 3, 1929 – December 20, 2006), was an American playwright and screenwriter who achieved limited success on both Broadway and in Hollywood.

Bishop was born in Mansfield, Ohio. He majored in theatre at Carnegie Mellon University in Pittsburgh and began his career as an actor at the Cleveland Play House in Cleveland. Although his stage career led into directing, his first success on Broadway came from writing the play The Trip Back Down, which played for two months at the Longacre Theatre in early 1977. In 1987, he made it back to Broadway by writing and directing The Musical Comedy Murders of 1940, which ran for almost four months, again at the Longacre. During this time, Bishop was also a member of the acclaimed off-Broadway Circle Repertory Company. Mr. Bishop moved west after the dissolution of Circle Repertory Company in 1997 and founded Circle West, which carried on many of the artistic missions of the original Circle Repertory Company. Bishop served as artistic director until his death. Among the plays the company produced was Mr. Bishop's Legacies, a police-detective drama.

After Broadway, Bishop began writing for Hollywood. He wrote the screenplay for The Package, a 1989 action thriller starring Gene Hackman. Although The Package earned poorly at the box office, the film was well regarded by some critics, including Roger Ebert, who gave it three stars out of four. Rotten Tomatoes gave the film a rating of 64% based on 14 reviews.

Bishop also did writing work for Paramount Studios, where he used his knowledge of and interest in male behaviour and police procedures to do rewrites for big-budget thrillers such as Clear and Present Danger and Beverly Hills Cop III.

Bishop fathered three children, named Matthew, Michael, and Christopher. Although a resident of Encino, he died at a clinic in Bad Heilbrunn, Germany at the age of 77 and was survived by his wife Lisa.

== Film and TV ==
- Comedy Zone (TV series) 1984
- The Package (written by) 1989
- Sliver (rewrite) 1993
- Drop Zone (screenplay) 1994
- Clear and Present Danger (rewrite) 1994
- Beverly Hills Cop III (rewrite) 1994
- Primal Fear (rewrite) 1996

== Theatre ==
- The Trip Back Down
- The Musical Comedy Murders of 1940
- Borderlines
- The Great Grandson of Jedediah Kohler
- The Harvesting
- The Beaver Coat (directed)
- El Salvador (directed)
- Florida Crackers (directed)
- Empty Hearts (written and directed)
