= More Fire! Productions =

More Fire! Productions was a women's theatre collective active in New York City from 1980 to 1988. It was founded by Robin Epstein and Dorothy Cantwell and based in the East Village section of Lower Manhattan, New York City. More Fire! Productions created and produced eight full-length plays between 1980 and 1988, becoming known as "one of the city's leading women's theatre groups" for its contributions to the downtown, experimental theatre, and women's and lesbian theatre scenes of the 1980s. Epstein and Cantwell co-wrote, produced, and performed in the company's first three plays: As the Burger Broils (1980), The Exorcism of Cheryl (1981), and Junk Love (1981), which had numerous runs and became a neighborhood cult classic, "the longest running show on Avenue A." Epstein then wrote and produced The Godmother (1983). Novelist and writer Sarah Schulman joined the company in 1983 and collaborated on the writing and performing of three later plays: Art Failures (1983), Whining and Dining (1984), and Epstein on the Beach (1985). The final play, Beyond Bedlam (1987), was written and produced by Epstein, who was the only person involved in all More Fire! plays.

== Early history ==
Along with Epstein and Cantwell, another founding member of More Fire! was Stephanie Doba, who collaborated on and performed in six More Fire! plays. In the mid-1970s, Doba was working at The Kosciuszko Foundation, a Polish-American non-profit organization having its headquarters in New York City. She was asked by Polish theatre director Jerzy Grotowski to help facilitate the participation of Americans in the "Tree of People", a new project of his Polish Laboratory Theatre. Grotowski's work at that time embodied a search for authentic expression through improvisation and interaction among participants, rather than performance for audiences. Cantwell and Doba met as participants in the Tree of People project in Wrocław, Poland, in the winter of 1979.

Grotowski's focus on improvisatory expression matched and nurtured a strong interest in movement improvisation in the downtown community of the East Village in the late 1970s. Open Movement, the weekly participatory event held at Performance Space 122 (also known as P.S. 122), became a regular meeting ground for New York and European dancers, actors and other artists, a number of whom had taken part in Grotowski's projects. Cantwell, Doba, and Epstein were all regular participants in Open Movement. Cantwell and Doba began collaborating with Epstein, who was then primarily a painter, to create an avant-garde, experimental theatre style.

Another founding member was Marianne Willtorp, now a member of the Swedish Film Institute (Svenska Filminstitutet). Willtorp collaborated on and performed in The Exorcism of Cheryl, Junk Love, and The Godmother. Willtorp's 1981 documentary film More Fire! explores the making of the collective's first original experimental play, As the Burger Broils, which used the movement and physicality of restaurant work to create theatre. The film shows the company's improvisational use of restaurant movement and language, and its real-life context in Epstein and Cantwell's lives as busy East Village artists and actresses who earned their livings as waitresses.

As co-founders of More Fire! Productions, Epstein and Cantwell shared a joint vision and aesthetic. Cantwell's writing and acting abilities were crucial to the company's early success. Her primary interest was in creating a passionate, funny, excessive style of acting, using characters and situations drawn with broad strokes and shameless exaggeration. Cantwell's ability to improvise and understanding of theatre inspired and shaped Epstein's own theatrical vision, which also developed out of her work as a painter, interest in popular film, and background as a working-class Jewish New Yorker. More Fire! used the superficial appearance of autobiography––particularly Epstein's––as a framework for the satirical exploration of a variety of themes and genres, including the confessional style of some East Village performance art. The company's style developed through collaborative improvising and writing, with lesbians and straight women working together to create and sustain an avant-garde, alternative theatre company.

== Later history ==
In 1983, Cantwell began to perform with Good Medicine and Company, founded by Carlos Ricardo Martinez and downtown actor/playwright Jeff Weiss. She performed in carlos ricardo martinez's Teddy and the Social Worker and Art the Rat. She starred with Jeff Weiss in his long-running, episodic show, . . . and That's How the Rent Gets Paid (Part IV). Cantwell also performed with Weiss and members of the Wooster Group, including Ron Vawter and Willem Dafoe, at the Performing Garage. In 1987, Cantwell debuted on Broadway (at the Longacre Theatre) in Circle Repertory Company's production of John Bishop's The Musical Comedy Murders of 1940.

Epstein, who has been called the "lesbian equivalent of Woody Allen," continued as the central creative and organizing force behind More Fire! until she decided to disband the company in 1988. She was involved in every aspect of the production end as well as the artistic creation and design. She wrote, often in collaboration with others, all eight More Fire! experimental plays, performed in them, designed sets and painted scenery, created popular music soundtracks, and wrote songs.

Epstein's later work with More Fire! includes Beyond Bedlam and three plays written in collaboration with Sarah Schulman: Art Failures, Whining and Dining, and Epstein on the Beach. Other downtown performers appeared with the company, including Stephanie Skura in the title role in The Godmother, Jennifer Miller in Whining and Dining and Epstein on the Beach, and Holly Hughes in Whining and Dining. Writer and performer Deb Margolin contributed monologues for The Godmother and Beyond Bedlam, and a guest appearance in Junk Love. Some productions (Junk Love and Epstein on the Beach) also included male actors, such as actor/playwright Paul Walker and comic Jerry Turner.

== Audience and critics ==
More Fire! Productions developed a following among East Village theatre audiences. East Village, women's, and New York gay and lesbian publications commented on the company's energy, inventiveness, broad humor, and satire of the downtown arts scene. Other Stages described Junk Love as "savagely witty" and praised the company's "original and daring performers." The New York Native called Whining and Dining "theater as carnival." The Flue, published by Franklin Furnace, an avant-garde art and performance space, noted that "the business is fast and funny, ferociously local." The East Village Eye wrote of Art Failures: "Perhaps Epstein and Schulman's greatest achievement was their ability to crystalize the contradictions at the heart of the theatre/performance world. . . . Along the way Epstein and Schulman knowingly poke fun at themselves and lots of other talented individuals."

Performances by More Fire! received mixed reviews in The New York Times and The Village Voice. Stephen Holden of The New York Times wrote: "Obviously, ensembles like More Fire!, which has earned a loyal cult following, are determined to remain outside of the mainstream." C. Carr of The Village Voice wrote of Epstein on the Beach: "Parts of the show were quite funny––especially a parody of Quarry which managed to recreate and mock many of the visual high points of Meredith Monk's classic within a few minutes. But the gist of the story––that 'hypocrisy is the spice of life' and lesbians will sell out as fast as the next person––made it . . . cynical." The harshest commentary came from Alisa Solomon, also of The Village Voice, who reviewed Art Failures after audience members sent hundreds of postcards demanding a review. Although the postcards were part of the performance, Solomon saw them as a "cry for reviews" and described the play as "politically irresponsible. . . . Instead of taking potshots from a fortress of self-indulgence, why not seriously engage issues of capitalist patriarchy?"

== Performance venues ==
Most productions were performed at the University of the Streets, located on Seventh Street and Avenue A in the East Village. As the Burger Broils previewed at P.S. 122's Avant-Garde-Arama and then became the first full-length public play or performance ever to be presented in P.S. 122, in October 1980. In 1981, More Fire! participated in the Second Women's One World (WOW) Festival of women's and lesbian theatre, in New York City, where the company performed The Exorcism of Cheryl and an excerpt from Junk Love. The Exorcism of Cheryl was also performed at the 1981 Boston Women's Theatre Festival. In 1986, The Performing Garage hosted a More Fire! Productions retrospective that included performances of Junk Love and Epstein on the Beach.

== Plays ==
In April 2008, the More Fire! Productions archive, including scripts, photographs, reviews, production notes, and videos, was donated to NYC's Lincoln Center Library for the Performing Arts.

- As the Burger Broils (Oct. 1980)
- The Exorcism of Cheryl (April–June 1980; Feb. 1982)
- Junk Love (Nov. 1981, Feb. 1982, April 1982, May 1985, Sept. 1986)
- The Godmother (April 1983)
- Art Failures (Dec. 1983, April 1984)
- Whining and Dining (Dec. 1984-Jan. 1985)
- Epstein on the Beach (Nov. 1985, Sept. 1986)
- Beyond Bedlam (April–May 1987)
