= The Package (1989 film) =

1989 film by Andrew Davis

- Theatrical release poster
- Directed by: Andrew Davis
- Written by: John Bishop
- Produced by: Beverly Camhe; Tobie Haggerty
- Starring: Gene Hackman; Joanna Cassidy; Tommy Lee Jones; John Heard; Dennis Franz; Reni Santoni
- Cinematography: Frank Tidy
- Edited by: Billy Weber; Don Zimmerman
- Music by: James Newton Howard
- Distributed by: Orion Pictures
- Release date: August 25, 1989
- Running time: 108 min
- Country: United States
- Language: English
- Budget: $16 million
- Box office: $10.6 million

The Package is a 1989 American political action thriller film directed by Andrew Davis and written by John Bishop. It stars Gene Hackman, Joanna Cassidy, Tommy Lee Jones, with John Heard, Dennis Franz, and Reni Santoni in supporting roles.

Set during the Cold War, the film depicts the U.S. and Soviet governments as they are about to sign a disarmament treaty, to completely eliminate nuclear weapons. However, elements within each country's military are vehemently opposed to such a plan and determined to stop it at all costs.

== Plot ==
U.S. Army Special Forces Master Sergeant Johnny Gallagher is part of a unit patrolling outside a chalet in West Berlin, where the U.S. president and the Soviet General Secretary are beginning talks for mutual nuclear disarmament. In another section of the chalet, high-ranking generals from the U.S. and Soviet militaries secretly agree to sabotage the talks. When U.S. General Carlson refuses to go along with the plot, he is assassinated outside the chalet by killers posing as West German hikers – who slipped through the chalet's perimeter.

Gallagher is blamed for the disaster and assigned, as punishment, to escort an Army sergeant, named Walter Henke, back to the United States for court martial. After landing at Dulles International Airport, Gallagher is ambushed by an undercover team, who spirit Henke away. Gallagher tracks down Henke's wife and is surprised when she shows a photo of a different man as her husband. Gallagher realizes that the man he brought into the country is an imposter. After he leaves, the same undercover team kills Mrs. Henke and phones in an anonymous tip, identifying Gallagher as the killer, who is then detained. Meanwhile, the real Walter Henke is approached in West Germany by Colonel Glen Whitacre, who tasks him with a top-secret assignment to infiltrate a Neo-Nazi gang in his hometown of Chicago, who they believe are plotting to assassinate the President.

With the help of his ex-wife, Lt. Colonel Eileen Gallagher, and her assistant, Lt. Ruth Butler, Gallagher identifies the man he brought back from West Germany as Thomas Boyette, a long-service Army veteran with a history of covert operations. The trio deduces that impersonating a prisoner allowed Boyette to enter the country without a passport, meaning there is no record of his entry and no way to track his movements.

When the same undercover team kills Butler and attacks Eileen, Johnny rescues her and escapes the base with the help of his Army buddy, Sgt. Marth. The Gallaghers investigate the conspiracy on their own, starting with trying to find the real Walter Henke in Chicago, where the next phase of the planned peace talks will take place. Johnny approaches his military friend, Chicago Police Detective Milan Delich, who allows the Gallaghers to take shelter at his house. At a diner, the same undercover team attempts to kill Delich, leaving him wounded in the ensuing shootout and the team is killed with Gallagher's contact. As Delich is taken away by ambulance, conspirators dressed as cops capture Johnny, who is then held in the basement of the safe house where Boyette is staying.

After Boyette leaves for his assignment, Gallagher escapes and speeds toward downtown Chicago, using Boyette's surveillance photos from the basement as a guide to the planned assassination site. Meanwhile, the real Walter Henke is lured into an office building overlooking the site and killed by Boyette, the intention being to frame Henke for the assassination and make it look like he was killed later. Delich also kills one of Boyette's colleagues, Karl Richards, realizing of his collaboration to the scheme.

Following a hotel luncheon, the Soviet Press Secretary, one of the conspirators, convinces the General Secretary to make an unplanned stop just outside the hotel's garage for a photo op with émigré Russian families. Before the US Secret Service can secure the site, Boyette takes aim at the General Secretary with a sniper rifle, but Gallagher bursts into the room and shoots Boyette dead.

Outside the room where he found Boyette, Gallagher confronts Whitacre and accuses him of trying to start a war for no reason. Angrily, Whitacre says that nuclear weapons are the only thing preventing war, and he and his Soviet counterparts are just smart enough to realize that mutual disarmament would be disastrous for both countries. Gallagher promises to expose the conspiracy and storms off, ignoring Whitacre's threats. On the street, Gallagher reunites with Eileen and hugs her gratefully.

After his confrontation with Gallagher, Whitacre enters a limousine with his Soviet counterpart, who asks him what their next step is. Before he can answer, their driver pulls over the car and executes both of the colonels, thus ensuring that any blame will fall on them and the remaining conspirators will not be exposed.

== Cast ==
- Gene Hackman as Master Sergeant Johnny Gallagher
- Joanna Cassidy as Lt. Colonel Eileen Gallagher
- Tommy Lee Jones as Thomas Boyette / "Sgt. Walter Henke"
- John Heard as Colonel Glen Whitacre
- Dennis Franz as Lt. Milan Delich
- Reni Santoni as a Chicago Police Lieutenant
- Pam Grier as Lt. Ruth Butler
- Chelcie Ross as General Hopkins
- Ron Dean as Karl Richards
- Kevin Crowley as Sgt. Walter Henke
- Thalmus Rasulala as Secret Service Agent
- Marco St. John as Marth

== Production notes ==
Although the story takes place in West Germany, Washington, D.C., Arlington, Virginia, and ends with numerous Chicago settings, the closing credits reveal the film was shot entirely in Chicago and other Illinois locations, with the exception of the opening credits sequence filmed at the Soviet War Memorial in Tiergarten of the West German territory of West Berlin.

== Reception ==
=== Critical response ===
The Package holds a 68% rating on Rotten Tomatoes, based on 19 reviews.

Roger Ebert awarded the film three stars out of four, calling it "smarter than most thrillers".

=== Box office ===
In the United States and Canada, The Package grossed $10.6 million at the box office, a net loss against its budget of $16 million.
