= Kelly Connell =

American film, stage and television actor

- Born: June 9, 1956 (age 70); Seneca Falls, New York, U.S.
- Occupations: Film, stage and television actor
- Years active: 1982–present

Kelly Connell (born June 9, 1956) is an American film, stage and television actor. He is best known for playing Dr. Carter Pike in the American family drama television series Picket Fences.

== Life and career ==
Connell was born in Seneca Falls, New York. He attended Cayuga Community College. He began his acting career in 1982, appearing in the stage play The Butter and Egg Man. He appeared in such other plays as The Musical Comedy Murders of 1940, Love Labour's Lost, Neon Psalms and Caligula.

Later in his career, Connell appeared in numerous television programs including The Practice, Wings, Buffy the Vampire Slayer, Murphy Brown, Chicago Hope, Night Court and The Fresh Prince of Bel-Air. He also appeared in numerous films such as Cocktail (as a guy in a bar), Thirteen Days, Hot Shots!, Hot Shots! Part Deux, Longtime Companion and Jack the Bear.

In 1992, Connell starred in the ABC family drama television series Picket Fences, playing Dr. Carter Pike. After the series ended in 1996, he made a voice appearance in the Nickelodeon series Aaahh!!! Real Monsters. In 1998, he played President Ulysses S. Grant in the UPN miniseries The Secret Diary of Desmond Pfeiffer.
