= Richard Libertini =

American actor (1933–2016)

- Born: Richard Joseph Libertini; May 21, 1933; Cambridge, Massachusetts, U.S.
- Died: January 7, 2016 (aged 82); Venice, California, U.S.
- Education: Emerson College
- Occupation: Actor
- Years active: 1966–2013
- Spouse: Melinda Dillon (m. 1963; div. 1978)
- Children: 1

Richard Joseph Libertini (May 21, 1933 – January 7, 2016) was an American stage, film and television actor.

He was known for playing character roles and his ability to speak in numerous accents. His films include Catch-22 (1970), The In-Laws (1979), Popeye (1980), Sharky's Machine (1981), All of Me (1984), Fletch (1985), Fletch Lives (1989), Awakenings (1990), Lethal Weapon 4 (1998), and Dolphin Tale (2011), which was his final film role.

== Early life ==
Libertini was born in Cambridge, Massachusetts, and graduated from Emerson College in Boston. During his early years, Libertini worked in New York City and in Chicago. He moved to Los Angeles to pursue an acting career during the 1960s.

== Career ==
He was an original cast member of The Mad Show, a 1966 Off-Broadway musical-comedy produced by Mad magazine. His first film appearances were in The Night They Raided Minsky's (1968), Don't Drink the Water (1969) and Catch-22 (1970).

Two of his more memorable film roles came in the comedies Fletch (1985), in which he played Chevy Chase's character's doubting editor, a role he repeated in the 1989 sequel Fletch Lives, and The In-Laws (1979), in which he played General Garcia, an insane Latin American dictator whose closest advisor was a cartoon face drawn on his own hand a la Señor Wences. He portrayed Nosh, an electronics expert who is a childhood best friend of Burt Reynolds's character, in Sharky's Machine (1981).

He also played a traveling vaudevillian in Terrence Malick's Days of Heaven (1978), the greengrocer George W. Geezil in Robert Altman's Popeye (1980), a Hispanic priest in Best Friends (1982), the servant Giuseppe in Unfaithfully Yours (1984), spiritual advisor Prahka Lasa ("Back in Bowl!") in All of Me (1984), the bandit Dijon in Disney's animated feature film DuckTales the Movie: Treasure of the Lost Lamp (1990), and a rabbi in Lethal Weapon 4 (1998).

On television, Libertini was a series regular in the first season of Soap as the Godfather. He appeared as three different characters in episodes of Barney Miller. He also appeared in Evaluation (1978) and Middle Age (1979). He guest starred in the Star Trek: Deep Space Nine episode "Accession" as a Bajoran named Akorem Laan, and in the Sonny with a Chance episode "Dakota's Revenge" as Izzy, an insane mechanic. He also voiced Wally Llama on Animaniacs, and starred in three short-lived sitcoms: Family Man (1988), in which he played a middle-aged comedy writer who married a much younger woman and became a father late in life; The Fanelli Boys (1990–1991), in which he played an Italian priest; and Pacific Station (1991–1992), in which he played a police detective.

Libertini appeared on the TV show Supernatural. His final film role was that of a fisherman in the 2011 film Dolphin Tale. From October 2011 through January 2012, Libertini appeared on Broadway as a rabbi in "Honeymoon Motel", the Woody Allen-penned segment of Relatively Speaking.

== Personal life and death ==
Libertini married actress Melinda Dillon on September 30, 1963; he had one child with her, Richard. They divorced in 1978.

Libertini died at the age of 82 in Venice, California, on January 7, 2016, from cancer. He had been diagnosed two years prior.

== Selected filmography ==
=== Film ===
Year	Title	Role	Notes
1968	The Night They Raided Minsky's	Pockets	
1969	Don't Drink the Water	Father Drobney	
1970	The Out-of-Towners	Baggage Man in Boston	
1970	Catch-22	Brother John	
1971	Lady Liberty	Tim	Uncredited
1975	I Wonder Who's Killing Her Now?	Café Waiter, Jack Kirsten	
1977	Fire Sale	Painter	
1978	Days of Heaven	Vaudeville Leader	
1979	The In-Laws	General Garcia	
1980	Popeye	Geezil	
1981	Sharky's Machine	Nosh	
1982	Soup for One	Angelo	
1982	Best Friends	Jorge Mendina	
1983	Going Berserk	Sun Yi Day	
1983	Deal of the Century	Masaggi	
1984	Unfaithfully Yours	Giuseppe	
1984	All of Me	Prahka Lasa	
1985	Fletch	Frank Walker	
1986	Big Trouble	Dr. Lopez	
1988	Betrayed	Sam Kraus	
1989	Fletch Lives	Frank Walker	
1989	Animal Behavior	Doctor Parrish	
1990	The Lemon Sisters	Nicholas Panas	
1990	DuckTales the Movie: Treasure of the Lost Lamp	Dijon (voice)	
1990	Awakenings	Sidney	
1990	The Bonfire of the Vanities	Ed Rifkin	
1994	Nell	Alexander Paley	
1994	Cultivating Charlie	Glosser	
1998	Lethal Weapon 4	Rabbi Gelb	Uncredited
1998	Telling You	Mr. P	
2002	The 4th Tenor	Vincenzo	
2006	Grilled	Rabbi Silver	
2007	Everybody Wants to Be Italian	Aldo Tempesti	
2011	Dolphin Tale	Fisherman	
2014	How to Become an Outlaw	Judge Volpay	Documentary

=== Television ===
Year	Title	Role	Notes
1977	The Bob Newhart Show	Dr. Pitt	Season 5 Episode 17
1977	The Bob Newhart Show	Mr. Twillmer	Season 6 Episode 9
1978	Alice	Ben, an Arab Sheik	Episode: "Florence of Arabia"
1985	The Greatest Adventure: Stories from the Bible	Apple Merchant (voice)	Episode: "The Creation"
1990	DuckTales	Dijon (voice)	3 episodes
1990–1991	The Fanelli Boys	Angelo Lombardi	Recurring role
1993	Animaniacs	Wally Llama (voice)	Episode: "Wally Llama"
1995	Pinky and the Brain	Talleyrand (voice)	Episode: "Napoleon Brainaparte"
1996	The Real Adventures of Jonny Quest	Commissioner (voice)	Episode: "Bloodlines"
1996	Star Trek: Deep Space Nine	Akorem Laan	Episode: "Accession"
1998	Columbo	Sheik Yarami	Episode: "Ashes to Ashes"
2002	Static Shock	Ragtag (voice)	Episode: "Power Play"
2002	The Zeta Project	Dr. Myrell (voice)	Episode: "The Wrong Morph"
2005	Monk	Dr. David Sobin	Episode: "Mr. Monk Gets Drunk"
2007	A Grandpa for Christmas	Karl Sugarman	Television film
2009	Supernatural	Vernon Haskell	Episode: "Criss Angel is a Douche Bag"
