= The Crew (2000 film) =

2000 film by Michael Dinner

- Theatrical release poster
- Directed by: Michael Dinner
- Written by: Barry Fanaro
- Produced by: Barry Sonnenfeld; Barry Josephson
- Starring: Richard Dreyfuss; Burt Reynolds; Dan Hedaya; Seymour Cassel; Carrie-Anne Moss; Jennifer Tilly; Lainie Kazan; Jeremy Piven
- Cinematography: Juan Ruiz Anchía
- Edited by: Nicholas C. Smith
- Music by: Steve Bartek
- Production companies: Touchstone Pictures; Sonnenfeld Josephson Worldwide Entertainment
- Distributed by: Buena Vista Pictures Distribution
- Release date: August 25, 2000
- Running time: 87 minutes
- Country: United States
- Language: English
- Budget: $38 million
- Box office: $13.1 million

The Crew is a 2000 American black comedy crime film directed by Michael Dinner, and starring Burt Reynolds, Seymour Cassel, Richard Dreyfuss, Dan Hedaya, Carrie-Anne Moss, Jeremy Piven and Jennifer Tilly. Barry Sonnenfeld was one of the film's producers. The film is about four retired mobsters doing one last crime against a drug lord. It was released on August 25, 2000. The Crew garnered negative reviews and was a box-office bomb, grossing $13.1 million against a $38 million budget.

== Plot ==
Four retired mobsters: Bobby Bartellemeo - the no-nonsense leader, Bats Pistella - a cantankerous man with a short fuse and a pacemaker, Mouth Donato - a silent ladies' man many years past his prime, and Brick Donatelli - a man who still sends Christmas cards to everyone he has ever worked with, are worried they will no longer be able to afford their South Beach apartment when rents go up due to it becoming a hot spot for young affluent couples. The four plan to stage a murder in the lobby of their building, hoping to make the apartment building undesirable to new tenants, and steal a corpse from the mortuary to use as the "victim." Unknown to them, the body is that of Luis Ventanna, the senile father of Raoul Ventanna, head of a Colombian drug smuggling ring. As a result of the "murder," many of the young renters leave and the four men are given cash and a rent discount by the complex to keep living there.

Bobby has been paying a private detective to find his daughter, Olivia, whom he hasn't seen since she was a child, but the others spend their shares of the windfall recklessly. Mouth begins frequenting a strip club and paying attention to a young dancer named Ferris Lowenstein. Mouth, who becomes talkative after intimacy with a woman, reveals to Ferris that he and his friends staged the murder. In return for her silence, Ferris asks them to kill her stepmother, Pepper. They agree, but kidnap Pepper instead, planning to fake her death by setting fire to her mansion. In the process, they burn down the mansion next door, which belongs to Ventanna.

Believing that someone is trying to usurp his power, Ventanna offers $100,000 to anyone who brings him the head of the man responsible. This results in a confrontation at the apartment, leading to the capture of Mouth, Ferris, Pepper and Detectives Olivia Neal and Steve Menteer, the police officers who have been investigating the original "murder." The other wiseguys escape this conflict, and follow the kidnappers to the docks where the prisoners are being held.

Brick calls all of their still-living former associates and they lay siege to the ship. During the rescue, Detective Menteer is revealed to be on Ventanna's payroll and Bobby recognizes Detective Neal as his now-grown daughter. The wiseguys then turn the ship, the drug smugglers, and the dirty cop over to the police, along with a shipment of drugs. A truckload of Cuban cigars is taken by the four friends and used to make their apartment complex into "a retirement home for old wiseguys who are down on their luck."

== Cast ==
- Richard Dreyfuss as Bobby Bartellemeo
  - Casey Siemaszko as Young Bobby Bartellemeo
- Burt Reynolds as Joey "Bats" Pistella
  - Matthew Borlenghi as Young Joey "Bats" Pistella
- Dan Hedaya as Mike "The Brick" Donatelli
  - Jeremy Ratchford as Young Mike "The Brick" Donatelli
- Seymour Cassel as Tony "Mouth" Donato
  - Billy Jayne as Young Tony "Mouth" Donato
- Carrie-Anne Moss as Detective Olivia Neal
  - Samantha Kurzman as Young Olivia Neal
- Jennifer Tilly as Maureen "Ferris" Lowenstein
- Lainie Kazan as Pepper Lowenstein
- Miguel Sandoval as Raul Ventana
- Jeremy Piven as Detective Steve Menteer
- Mike Moroff as Jorge
- José Zúñiga as Escobar
- Carlos Gomez as Miguel
- Louis Guss as Jerry "The Hammer" Fungo
- Joseph Rigano as Frankie "Rash" Decuello
- Ron Karabatsos as Fat Pauly
- Frank Vincent as Marty
- Marc Macaulay as Driver
- Cullen Douglas as Young Man
- Louis Lombardi as Jimmy "Whistles"
- Lorri Bagley as Sofa Girl
- Antoni Corone as Officer
- Fyvush Finkel as Sol Lowenstein
- Christa Campbell as Nurse
- Allan F. Nicholls as Wiseguy

== Reception ==
The Crew received negative reviews upon release, and was mostly noted for its similarities to Space Cowboys, which also involved four retirees who return for one last job (in that case, to go back into space). On the review aggregator website Rotten Tomatoes, 20% of 85 critics' reviews are positive, with an average rating of 3.8/10. The website's consensus reads: "Though the four actors are good together, the jokes are stale and not funny." Metacritic, which uses a weighted average, assigned the film a score of 37 out of 100, based on 28 critics, indicating "generally unfavorable" reviews.

Roger Ebert criticized the film for having an unbelievable premise with "desperate" slapstick and aggression, and characters that lack chemistry and individualism compared to the "heft and dimension" the main cast of Space Cowboys had, saying that "The Crew unfolds as a construction, not a series of surprises and delights." A. O. Scott of The New York Times commended Richard Dreyfuss and Dan Hedaya for their performances and Barry Fanaro's script for having an "inspired set piece" and "pretty funny" jabs at "ethnic stereotypes", but wrote that: "The Crew is cobbled together in desperate obedience to the widespread Hollywood fallacy that the more plot a movie has, the more people will like it." Entertainment Weekly's Lisa Schwarzbaum gave the film a D grade, highlighting the script's "stereotyping" of its main leads, saying that "each man's shtick swells into a frenzy of overacting in the name of aging that should have died with The Golden Girls."

The film was a box office flop, grossing only US$13 million off an estimated $38 million budget.
