= The Fanelli Boys =

- Genre: Sitcom
- Created by: Barry Fanaro; Terry Grossman; Mort Nathan; Kathy Speer
- Starring: Ann Morgan Guilbert; Ned Eisenberg; Joe Pantoliano; Christopher Meloni; Andy Hirsch; Richard Libertini; Vera Lockwood
- Opening theme: "Why Should I Worry?"
- Composer: Thomas Pasatieri
- Country of origin: United States
- Original language: English
- No. of seasons: 1
- No. of episodes: 19

Production
- Cinematography: Vincent Contarino
- Running time: 30 minutes
- Production companies: KTMB Productions; Touchstone Television

Original release
- Network: NBC
- Release: September 8, 1990 – February 16, 1991

The Fanelli Boys is an American sitcom television series that aired on NBC from September 8, 1990, to February 16, 1991, as part of its 1990–91 prime time schedule. The series was created by the team of Barry Fanaro, Mort Nathan, Kathy Speer, and Terry Grossman, all of whom previously worked on The Golden Girls.

== Synopsis ==
Following the death of her husband, Theresa Fanelli (Ann Morgan Guilbert) is prepared to sell the family business (a funeral home) to her son Anthony (Ned Eisenberg) and move from Brooklyn to Florida. Thwarting her plans are the arrival of her younger sons Ronnie (Andy Hirsch), who had just dropped out of school, and Frankie (Chris Meloni), whose engagement has just been broken. Another brother, the slightly disreputable Dom (Joe Pantoliano), is between hustles. Anthony learns that the funeral home is about $25,000 in debt, which he had not counted on. Soon, all of the boys are back at home with their mom, just like the old days. Advising the family, somewhat dubiously, are Theresa's brother, a Catholic priest known as "Father Angelo" (Richard Libertini), and fortune teller Philomena (Vera Lockwood). The Fanelli Boys showed fairly strong Italian-American ethnic stereotyping; there was even an Italian flag in the program's logo.

The series garnered low ratings; in an October 5, 1990, interview, NBC executive Warren Littlefield said it could be cancelled as soon as the ratings for episode 5 came in. He added that the show is in "good shape creatively but we need to market it better. What we don't want to do is panic and say too quickly that it's not working and say goodbye to a Cheers or Family Ties," referring to NBC sitcoms that started slowly but became long-running hits. The Fanelli Boys was cancelled in February 1991 after airing nineteen episodes.

== Cast ==
- Joe Pantoliano.....Dom Fanelli
- Ann Morgan Guilbert.....Theresa Fanelli
- Ned Eisenberg.....Anthony Fanelli
- Christopher Meloni.....Frankie Fanelli
- Andy Hirsch.....Ronnie Fanelli
- Richard Libertini.....Father Angelo
- Vera Lockwood.....Philomena

== Title sequence ==
The show's original opening sequence was filmed footage of a dining room table (presumably the Fanellis') as it was set by its family, followed by them sitting down and serving pasta and wine, which culminated in everyone toasting. Only the family's hands were seen during the entire sequence. This was accompanied by an instrumental, old-world Italian tune.

In January 1991, a month before The Fanelli Boys was cancelled, the opening changed to featuring videotaped scenes from the show with the cast, along with an in-house rendition of Billy Joel's "Why Should I Worry?" as the new lyrical theme.

== Episodes ==
| No. | Title | Directed by | Written by | Original release date |
|---|---|---|---|---|
| 1 | "Pilot" | James Burrows | Barry Fanaro & Mort Nathan and Kathy Speer & Terry Grossman | September 8, 1990 |
| 2 | "You Can Go Home Again" | Unknown | Unknown | September 12, 1990 |
| 3 | "Pursued" | David Steinberg | Robert Bruce & Martin Weiss | September 19, 1990 |
| 4 | "The Hex" | Unknown | Unknown | September 26, 1990 |
| 5 | "Heart Attack" | Unknown | Unknown | October 3, 1990 |
| 6 | "Take My Ex-Wife, Please" | J.D. Lobue | Unknown | October 10, 1990 |
| 7 | "Poetic Justice" | Unknown | Unknown | October 24, 1990 |
| 8 | "Father Smoke" | Gary Brown | Unknown | October 31, 1990 |
| 9 | "Tarnished Angel" | Jim Drake | Robert Bruce & Martin Weiss | November 7, 1990 |
| 10 | "The Two Doms" | Unknown | Unknown | November 14, 1990 |
| 11 | "An Italian-American Gigolo" | Unknown | Unknown | December 1, 1990 |
| 12 | "A Fanelli Christmas" | Jim Drake | Barry Fanaro & Mort Nathan and Kathy Speer & Terry Grossman | December 8, 1990 |
| 13 | "Oh My Papas" | Unknown | Unknown | December 15, 1990 |
| 14 | "Accidents Will Happen" | Unknown | Unknown | January 5, 1991 |
| 15 | "Doctor, Doctor" | Andrew D. Weyman | Tom Maxwell & Don Woodard | January 12, 1991 |
| 16 | "Rope a Dope" | Unknown | Unknown | January 19, 1991 |
| 17 | "The Undergraduate" | Unknown | Unknown | February 2, 1991 |
| 18 | "The Wedding: Part 1" | Unknown | Unknown | February 9, 1991 |
| 19 | "The Wedding: Part 2" | Unknown | Unknown | February 16, 1991 |
