= The Musical Comedy Murders of 1940 =

Play by John Bishop

- Written by: John Bishop
- Genre: Comedy

Premiere
- Date: January 7, 1987
- Place: Circle Repertory Company; New York City

The Musical Comedy Murders of 1940 is a comedy by John Bishop. The play was first performed at the Circle Repertory Company in their theatre at 99 Seventh Avenue South in New York City, later moving to Broadway, opening on April 6, 1987, in The Longacre Theatre. Both productions were directed by the playwright and shared the same cast. The play is said to have been based on several 1940s mystery movies, including The Cat and the Canary, one of Bob Hope's first films.

== Plot ==
The play takes place in a mansion in Chappaqua, New York in December 1940, specifically, the library. The mansion is owned by Elsa Von Grossenknueten, who is there with her maid, Helsa Wenzel.

In the opening scene, we see Helsa is killed by a masked figure. We also see Elsa talking to a police officer, Michael Kelly, about some sort of undercover scheme. Both are unaware of the maid's murder.

The next morning, we see Helsa again, and her personality seems to have changed. The guests Elsa has invited soon begin to arrive. They have been invited for a backer's audition to the Musical White House Merry-Go-Round.

The first of the invited guests is an Irish tenor named Patrick O'Reilly. He's quickly followed by a bombastic theatre director named Ken De La Maize, and a beautiful young singer/dancer named Nikki Crandall. Nikki is followed in by a young (and bad) comedian named Eddie McCuen, who takes an instant liking to Nikki.

While talking with Nikki, Eddie realizes that everyone (including Marjorie Baverstock, the producer, and Roger Hopewell and Bernice Roth, the writers) were all part of the creative team that made Manhattan Holiday, in which The Stage Door Slasher murdered three women. Eddie instantly wants to leave, and tells Nikki that she should leave as well, but he decides to stay after Marjorie and Elsa enter and woo him into staying. Roger Hopewell and Bernice Roth arrive and meet the performers, and the group gets started with their work.

After things get underway, Marjorie is murdered and the body of Helsa is discovered. After a series of dizzy conversations, multiple trips through secret doorways leading to a labyrinth of hidden passageways, a power outage in the mansion, multiple crimes, and criminals are revealed. Eventually after much murderous mayhem the Stage Door Slasher is revealed and captured through deciphering Bebe's coded notebook.

== Main characters ==
=== Helsa Wenzel ===
Helsa is the maid of the Grossenknueten estate. She is killed in the first scene of the play, only to be impersonated by her homicidal twin brother, Dieter. The actress who plays Helsa also appears at the end of the play as "Katrina, the cook from Koblenz."

=== Elsa Von Grossenknueten ===
Elsa is the eccentric owner of the mansion and is the financial backer of many musicals. Elsa summons the group together in an attempt to find out who murdered her "friend" Bebe McAllister. She is extremely eccentric, and thinks that the idea of chasing after a killer is great fun. Her grandfather was a spy, and she claims that espionage runs in her blood.

=== Michael Kelly ===
Kelly is an undercover cop. Elsa appeals to him to help solve the mystery of the Stage Door Slasher, and Kelly at first pretends to be her butler. Kelly's tough, no-nonsense attitude puts him at odds with Elsa and the dramatic types that visit. He eventually reveals his identity as a New York police officer, much to Elsa's dismay. In the second act, he is kidnapped by an unseen figure and disappears into a secret passage, and is later found with his hands tied and a gag in his mouth. Willie C. Carpenter was the first to play him.

=== Patrick O'Reilly ===
O'Reilly claims to be an Irish tenor, but he is very suspicious, especially with regard to the mysterious Helsa. The two engage in a physical brawl. Eventually, O'Reilly claims to be "Tony Garibaldi", an undercover cop with a Bronx accent-only to reveal himself as a Gestapo Agent named Klaus Stansdorff, sent to find German defectors. Nikki confronts him, but before he can reveal the truth, Helsa stabs him through a copy of Moby-Dick in the second act, killing him. The original O'Reilly was played by Nicholas Wyman.

=== Ken De La Maize ===
First played by Michael Ayr. Ken is a "typical" director, speaking of theater as a "pure art." He also has an annoying habit of name-dropping, constantly citing the various celebrities he has worked with over the years. Everyone always claims to have seen the films he makes, only for him to reveal that they have not yet been released. Ken is eventually revealed as the Stage Door Slasher, and explains that his hatred of ballet dancers stems from his father, who ran off with one and abandoned his mother. He attempts to kill Nikki, along with Elsa, Roger and Bernice. Eddie ends up thwarting him, and he is taken away to prison, rambling about how he knows Louella Parsons.

=== Nikki Crandall ===
Originally played by Dorothy Cantwell. Nikki is considered a typical chorus girl-but she is eventually revealed to be Ensign Nicole Crandall, of United States Naval Intelligence. Her secret mission was to find the Germans who were sent over to sabotage the American war efforts. She is also interested in solving the mystery of the Stage Door Slasher, and helps to break the code in Bebe's notebook. Ken almost kills her, followed quickly by Dieter Wenzel. Eddie saves her twice, prompting the two to fall in love at the end.

=== Eddie McCuen ===
Directly based on Bob Hope, Eddie is the out of work comedian that ties the different story lines together, and goes from being cowardly at the beginning of the play to heroic at the end. He is attracted to Nikki, but fumbles when he tries to talk to her. He was a replacement for an actor, and thus has no connection to Manhattan Holiday. He is the one who realizes the connection between the Slasher case and the party, and later helps to defeat Ken and Dieter, both by knocking them out with a cognac bottle. These brave actions unite him with Nikki. He has an obvious attraction to Nikki throughout the whole play, and ultimately ends up saving the day and getting the girl. First played by Kelly Connell.

=== Marjorie Baverstock ===
Marjorie is a Broadway producer. She constantly flatters everyone around her, and speaks in elevated language; her "new word" is "divoon." She is accidentally killed by Dieter at the end of the first act (in the dark he thought she was Elsa); strangely, no one seems to notice, despite the fact that there is an enormous sword through her back. Eddie, Ken and Kelly bury her dead body in a snowdrift in the beginning of the second act. Marjorie was first played by Pamela Dunlap.

=== Roger Hopewell ===
Originally played by Richard Seff. Roger is the composer for "White House Merry-Go-Round", and Bernice's partner; the two have had a string of Broadway hits. Roger enjoys teasing Ken about his artistic ways, and makes snide remarks throughout the play, but flares up whenever someone insults his musical style. He also knows how to deal with Bernice's many quirks. Towards the end of the play, Roger reveals a surprising knowledge of ciphers, and helps Nikki and Bernice break the code in Bebe's notebook.

=== Bernice Roth ===
The perpetually thirsty lyricist, she is Roger's partner. Bernice is very odd and emotional, frequently losing her composure and screaming. When Marjorie fails to respond to the second act opening number of "White House Merry-Go-Round", Bernice is hugely offended, despite the fact that Marjorie was dead at the time. She spends the entire second act attempting to "fix" the play, even when she is held hostage by Ken, O'Reilly, and Dieter. In the finale, she is struck with inspiration toward a new work that takes place in the heartland of America – a cowboy play called Nebraska. This is a spoof on the play Oklahoma!. Bobo Lewis originated the role.
