= The 10% Solution for a Healthy Life =

1993 non-fiction book by Ray Kurzweil

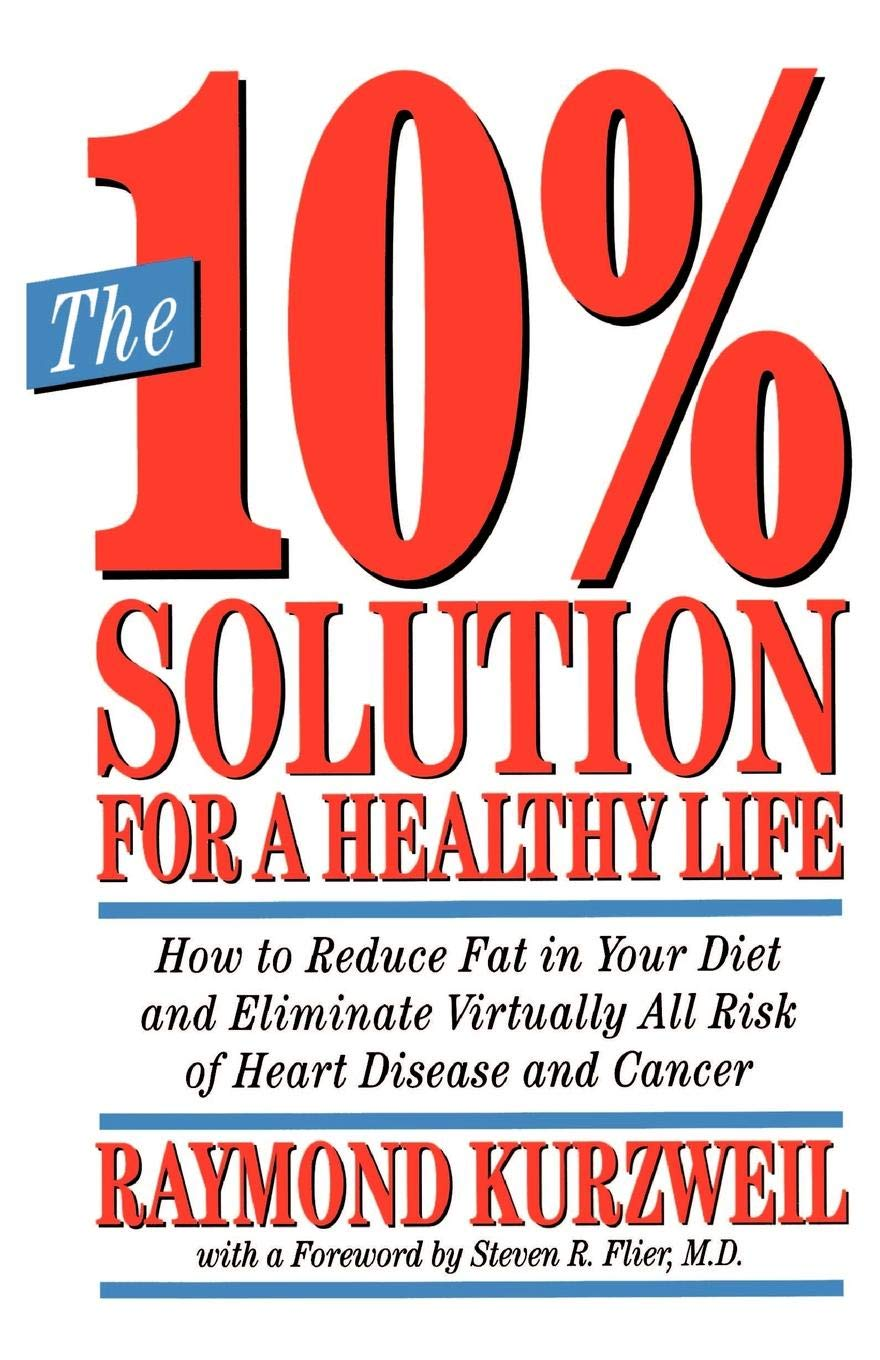
- Author: Raymond Kurzweil
- Language: English
- Subject: Low-fat diet
- Publisher: Three Rivers Press
- Publication date: January 1993
- Publication place: United States
- Media type: Print (hardcover)
- Pages: 357 pp
- ISBN: 0-517-88301-5
- OCLC: 299209237
- Followed by: Fantastic Voyage: Live Long Enough to Live Forever

The 10% Solution for a Healthy Life (ISBN 0-517-88301-5, paperback, 1993) is a health book written by computer scientist Ray Kurzweil and published in 1993. In the book, he explains to readers "How to Reduce Fat in Your Diet and Eliminate Virtually All Risk of Heart Disease and Cancer". Some of his recommendations have been updated and revised in subsequent years, particularly in his newer books: Fantastic Voyage: Live Long Enough to Live Forever and Transcend: Nine Steps to Living Well Forever.

== Summary ==
Atherosclerosis is a disease which is characterized by a progressive buildup of rigid material inside artery walls and channels. Eventually, they become so clogged that blood flow is stopped and the victim suffers a heart attack. This disease is caused by excess cholesterol in the bloodstream and afflicts approximately ninety percent of Americans, though it is a gradual process and may not even be detectable until later life.

Kurzweil cites various studies showing that increased levels of atherosclerosis in the U.S. and other western countries are linked to high levels of caloric fat intake. In much of Asia, fat intake is around ten percent of total food energy consumed, and heart disease there is almost nonexistent. Kurzweil goes on to show that in America, closer to forty percent of caloric intake is from fat.

Numerous agencies such as the American Dietetic Association, American Heart Association and Surgeon General of the United States advocate thirty percent of caloric intake from fat. However, Kurzweil says this causes a comparatively slight reduction in atherosclerosis levels. He says that he thinks these agencies use an artificially high figure because they assume that nobody would even attempt to attain a lower level if it were recommended.

Kurzweil advocates, based on his findings, only ten percent caloric intake be from fat. Hence, The 10% Solution. He says that these levels not only prevent Atherosclerosis but cause its reversal in existing cases. This also apparently lowers the chance of other diseases including cancer, strokes, hypertension and type 2 diabetes. He believes that eating a diet that is very low in fat reduces the risk of most major cancers by 90 percent or more. Kurzweil also claims it increases energy and leads to a generally happier life. Further he gives advice for exercise, suggesting walking, because it is low-impact, and easy for anyone to do.

== Foods to avoid ==
- High-sugar jams
- High-fat cheese
- Sweets (high in fat)
- Butter and margarine
- Eggs (high in cholesterol)
- Oil-based dressings (better: balsamic vinegar)
- Cakey muffins and croissant-type pastries (full of butter)
- Too much meat (particularly red meat), organ meats (like liver, brain)
- Vitamin and mineral supplements that include iron, and so-called "fortified" foods which have added iron.
- Hamburgers (a typical fast-food hamburger is around 50 percent fat by calories)
