= Fantastic Voyage: Live Long Enough to Live Forever =

2004 non-fiction book by Ray Kurzweil and Terry Grossman

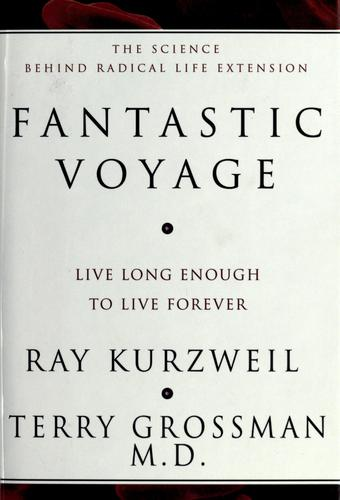
- Author: Ray Kurzweil; Terry Grossman
- Language: English
- Subject: Life extension
- Publisher: Rodale, Inc.
- Publication date: October 2004
- Publication place: United States
- Media type: Print (hardcover)
- Pages: 400 pp
- ISBN: 1-57954-954-3
- OCLC: 56011093
- Dewey Decimal: 612.6/8 22
- LC Class: RA776.75 .K875 2004
- Preceded by: The 10% Solution for a Healthy Life
- Followed by: Transcend: Nine Steps to Living Well Forever

Fantastic Voyage: Live Long Enough to Live Forever (Rodale Books, ISBN 1-57954-954-3) is a book authored by Ray Kurzweil and Terry Grossman published in 2004. The basic premise of the book is that if middle aged people can live long enough, until approximately 120 years, they will be able to live forever—as humanity overcomes all diseases and old age itself. This might also be considered a break-even scenario where developments made during a year increase life expectancy by more than one year. Biogerontologist Aubrey de Grey called this the "Longevity escape velocity" in a 2005 TED talk.

The book focuses primarily on health topics such as heart disease, cancer, and type 2 diabetes. It promotes lifestyle changes such as a low glycemic index diet, calorie restriction, exercise, drinking green tea and alkalinized water, and other changes to daily living. They also promote aggressive supplementation to make up for nutrient deficiencies they believe are common in Western society. In contrast to his previous book The 10% Solution for a Healthy Life, in which he recommended a diet with 10% of calories from fat, in this book, Kurzweil recommends consuming less than one third of calories from carbohydrates (and less than one sixth of calories in his low-carbohydrate diet) and consuming 25% of calories from fat.

The book states that the purpose of these changes is to obtain and maintain idyllic health so that an individual can extend their life as long as possible. The authors believe that within the next 20 to 50 years technology will advance to the point where much of the aging process will be conquered, and degenerative diseases eliminated. The book is peppered with side notes on these futuristic topics, showing how current research is leading us toward life extension, and explaining how future technologies such as nanotechnology and bioengineering might change the way humans live their lives. Ray Kurzweil discusses these topics at further length in his 2005 book The Singularity Is Near.

A follow-up on Fantastic Voyage, Transcend: Nine Steps to Living Well Forever, was released on April 28, 2009.

== Organization ==
- Chapter 1: You can live long enough to live forever
- Chapter 2: The bridges to come
- Chapter 3: Our personal journeys
- Chapter 4: Food and water
- Chapter 5: Carbohydrates and the glycemic load
- Chapter 6: Fat and protein
- Chapter 7: You are what you digest
- Chapter 8: Change your weight for life in one day
- Chapter 9: The problem with sugar (and insulin)
- Chapter 10: Ray's personal program
- Chapter 11: The promise of genomics
- Chapter 12: Inflammation—the latest "smoking gun"
- Chapter 13: Methylation—critically important to your health
- Chapter 14: Cleaning up the mess: Toxins and detoxification
- Chapter 15: The real cause of heart disease and how to prevent it
- Chapter 16: The prevention and early detection of cancer
- Chapter 17: Terry's personal program
- Chapter 18: Your brain: The power of thinking...and of ideas
- Chapter 19: Hormones and aging, hormones of youth
- Chapter 20: Other hormones of youth: Sex hormones
- Chapter 21: Aggressive supplementation
- Chapter 22: Keep moving: The power of exercise
- Chapter 23: Stress and balance
- Epilogue

== Criticisms ==
One claim in the book has been called pseudoscientific. Dr. Stephen Lower, retired Professor of Chemistry at Simon Fraser University, disputes some of the book's statements about alkaline water, claiming that "Ionized water" is nothing more than sales fiction; the term is meaningless to chemists." Kurzweil and Grossman counter this specific criticism directly in their Reader Q&A.

== See also ==
- Ending Aging
- Nutrition
- Simulated reality
- Technological singularity
- Millions Now Living Will Never Die
