= Barry Fanaro =

American screenwriter

- Born: United States
- Occupation: Screenwriter

Barry Fanaro is an American screenwriter of television and feature films. He has taught screenwriting seminars at USC, UCSB, AFI and Mercer University.

== Early life ==
Fanaro graduated magna cum laude with a dual major from Mercer University, Macon Georgia. He also has an MFA from NYU's Tisch Graduate School of Film and Television. In the early 80s he was a performing member of The Groundling's Improv Theater Group.

== Career ==
Fanaro wrote and produced over 250 episodes, pilots and original series for network television. He is best known for serving as writer/executive producer of The Golden Girls during its first four seasons. He was nominated for four Emmys and won two Emmys for Outstanding Writing and Best Comedy Show, Producer. Fanaro was also nominated for two Writers Guild of America Awards and won for Best Writer in 1987. He has three Golden Globes for Best Comedy/Variety Show. In 1989, both Fanaro, along with partner Mort Nathan, and two alums from The Golden Girls, Kathy Speer and Terry Grossman had started KTMB Productions with a deal at Walt Disney Studios. Both Fanaro and Nathan moved to Paramount Television in 1992 to start Fanaro/Nathan Productions.

In the 1990s Fanaro turned his attention to feature films. His credits include Kingpin, The Crew, Men in Black II and I Now Pronounce You Chuck and Larry. He was also a sought after script doctor and selected production re-writes include Analyze This, Big Trouble, What's The Worst That Could Happen? From 2009–present he sold four original feature film scripts which are currently in development.

== Filmography ==
=== Film ===
Year	Title	Role	Note(s)
1996	Kingpin	Writer	
2000	The Crew	Writer	
2002	Men in Black II	Screenplay	
2007	I Now Pronounce You Chuck and Larry	Screenplay	

=== Television ===
Year	Title	Role	Note(s)
1985	Hail to the Chief	Writer/Executive Script Consultant	4 episodes
1985-89	The Golden Girls	Writer/Producer/Supervising Producer/Co-Executive Producer/Executive Script Consultant	125 episodes
1990-91	The Fanelli Boys	Creator/Executive Producer	19 episodes
1991-92	Pacific Station	Creator/Executive Producer	5 episodes
1995	Platypus Man	Creator/Executive Producer	13 episodes
1998	The Secret Diary of Desmond Pfeiffer	Creator/Executive Producer	9 episodes
