= Mort Nathan =

American producer, writer, and director

- Born: United States
- Occupations: Screenwriter, film director, producer
- Notable work: The Golden Girls

Mort Nathan is an American television producer, screenwriter and film director. He was one of the co-producers and head writers of the comedy show The Golden Girls. Nathan won two Emmy awards, two Golden Globes, and a Writers Guild of America award for his work on the series. He has written and produced over 150 hours of prime time television shows and directed the feature films Boat Trip, Van Wilder 2: The Rise of Taj, and National Lampoon's Bag Boy.

In 1989, he started KTMB Productions with Barry Fanaro, and two alums from The Golden Girls, Kathy Speer and Terry Grossman, with a deal at Touchstone Television. Both Fanaro and Nathan subsequently moved to Paramount Television in 1992 to start out Fanaro/Nathan Productions.
