= 2nd Youth in Film Awards =

1980 US media awards ceremony

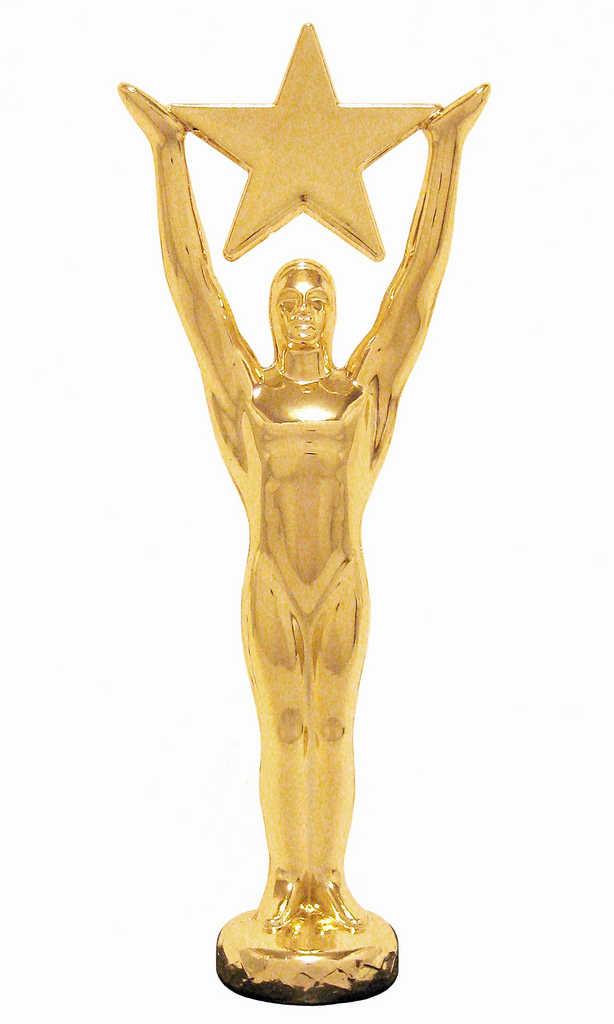
- Awarded for: Achievement in the 1979—1980 season
- Date: October 18, 1980
- Site: Sheraton Universal Hotel; Universal City, California
- Hosted by: Jodie Foster

The 2nd Youth in Film Awards ceremony (now known as the Young Artist Awards), presented by the Youth in Film Association, honored outstanding youth performers in the fields of film, television and music for the 1979–1980 season, and took place on October 18, 1980, at the Sheraton Universal Hotel in Universal City, California, United States.

Established in 1978 by long-standing Hollywood Foreign Press Association member, Maureen Dragone, the Youth in Film Association was the first organization to establish an awards ceremony specifically set to recognize and award the contributions of performers under the age of 18 in the fields of film, television, theater, and music.

== Categories ==
★ Bold indicates the winner in each category.

== Best Young Performer in a Feature Film ==
=== Best Young Actor in a Major Motion Picture ===
★ Justin Henry - Kramer vs. Kramer as Billy Kramer

- Christopher Atkins - The Blue Lagoon as Richard Lestrange
- Matt Dillon - My Bodyguard as Melvin Moody
- Paul McCrane - Fame as Montgomery MacNeil
- Barry Miller - Fame as Ralph Garci/Raul Garcia
- Ricky Schroder - The Last Flight of Noah's Ark as Bobby

=== Best Young Actress in a Major Motion Picture ===
★ Diane Lane - Touched by Love as Karen Brown

- Jodie Foster - Foxes as Jeanie
- Kristy McNichol - Little Darlings as Angel Bright
- Brooke Shields - The Blue Lagoon as Emmeline Lestrange

== Best Young Performer in a Television Special ==
=== Best Young Actor - TV Special ===
★ Michael Sharrett - Harvest - Faith For Today

- Rossie Harris - Amber Waves - ABC as Dougie Burkhardt
- Evan H. Miranda - ABC Afterschool Special: The Seven Wishes of a Rich Kid - ABC as Tommy
- Robbie Rist - ABC Weekend Special: The Big Hex of Little Lulu - ABC as Iggie

=== Best Young Actress - TV Special ===
★ Danielle Brisebois - Mom, the Wolfman and Me - Time-Life Television as Jenny Bergman

- Tonya Crowe - Joshua's World - ABC as Thorpe Torrance
- Kristy McNichol - My Old Man - CBS as Jo Butler
- Melissa Michaelsen - Orphan Train - ABC as J.P.

== Best Young Performer in a Television Series ==
=== Best Young Actor in a Television Series ===
★ Adam Rich - Eight is Enough - ABC as Nicholas Bradford

- Ira Angustain - The White Shadow - CBS as Ricardo "Go-Go" Gomez
- Gary Coleman - Diff'rent Strokes - NBC as Arnold Jackson
- Philip McKeon - Alice - CBS as Tommy Hyatt
- Harold Pruett - The Tim Conway Show - CBS as Self

=== Best Young Actress in a Television Series ===
★ Quinn Cummings - Family - ABC as Annie Cooper

- Danielle Brisebois - Archie Bunker's Place - CBS as Stephanie Mills
- Missy Gold - Benson - ABC as Katie Gatling
- Melissa Michaelsen - Me and Maxx - ABC as Maxx Davis
- Dana Plato - Diff'rent Strokes - NBC as Kimberly Drummond
- Natasha Ryan - Here's Boomer - NBC as Molly

=== Best Young Actor - Daytime TV Series ===
★ Philip Tanzini - General Hospital - ABC as Jeremy Hewitt

- John E. Dunn - All My Children - ABC as Tad Martin
- Jeremy Schoenberg - Days of Our Lives - NBC as Johnny Stockton

=== Best Young Actress - Daytime TV Series ===
★ Genie Francis - General Hospital - ABC as Laura Spencer

- Tracey Bregman - Days of Our Lives - NBC as Donna Temple Craig
- Andrea Evans - One Life to Live - ABC as Tina Lord
- Dana Kimmell - Texas - NBC as Dawn Marshall
- Stacey Moran - Search for Tomorrow - CBS as Suzi Martin Wyatt

== Best Young Comedy Performer ==
=== Best Young Comedian ===
★ Gary Coleman - Diff'rent Strokes - NBC as Arnold Jackson

- Scott Baio - Happy Days - ABC as Chachi Arcola
- Rossie Harris - Airplane! - Paramount as Joey Hammen
- Adam Rich - Eight is Enough - ABC as Nicholas Bradford

=== Best Young Comedienne ===
★ Kim Fields - The Facts of Life - NBC as Dorothy "Tootie" Ramsey

- Alison Arngrim - Little House on the Prairie - NBC as Nellie Oleson
- Valerie Bertinelli - One Day at a Time - CBS as Barbara Cooper Royer
- Melissa Michaelsen - Me and Maxx - NBC as Maxx Davis
- Jill Whelan - Airplane! - Paramount as Lisa Davis

== Best Young Musical Recording Artist ==
=== Best Young Disc Artist - Male ===
★ Christopher Cross - Ride Like the Wind - W.B.

- Shaun Cassidy - Wasp - W.B.
- Leif Garrett - Surfin' USA - Atlantic
- Paul McCrane - Fame - M.G.M.
- Rex Smith - You Take My Breath Away - Columbia

=== Best Young Disc Artist - Female ===
★ Irene Cara - Fame - M.G.M.

- Debby Boone - I'll Never Say Goodbye - W.B.
- Rickie Lee Jones - Chuck E.'s In Love - W.B.
- Dara Sedaka - In The Pocket

== Best Family Entertainment ==
=== Best Major Motion Picture for Family Entertainment ===
★ Touched by Love - Columbia

- Little Miss Marker - Universal
- The Blue Lagoon - Columbia
- The Last Flight of Noah's Ark - Disney
- Xanadu - Universal

=== Best TV Special for Family Entertainment ===
★ Harvest - Faith for Today

- Amber Waves - ABC
- Goldie and the Boxer - NBC
- The Long Days of Summer - ABC
- Solid Gold - Channel 13

=== Best TV Series for Family Entertainment ===
★ Eight is Enough - ABC

- Diff'rent Strokes - NBC
- Here's Boomer - NBC
- Kids Are People Too - ABC
- The Muppet Show - ITV

=== Best After School Television Special ===
★ NBC Special Treat: A Little Bit Different - NBC

- ABC Afterschool Special: The Seven Wishes of a Rich Kid - ABC
- ABC Weekend Special: The Big Hex of Little Lulu - ABC
- End of a Dream

=== Best Family Music Album ===
★ Fame - MGM

- Foxes - United Artists
- Can't Stop the Music - Casablanca
- Xanadu - Universal

== Special Award ==
=== Greatest Contribution to Youth Through Entertainment Media ===
★ Carol Johnston
