= Orphan Train (film) =

- Genre: Drama
- Written by: Millard Lampell
- Story by: Dorothea G. Petrie
- Directed by: William A. Graham
- Starring: Jill Eikenberry; Kevin Dobson; Linda Manz; Melissa Michaelsen
- Music by: Laurence Rosenthal
- Country of origin: United States
- Original language: English

Production
- Producers: Tony Converse; Roger Gimbel; Dorothea G. Petrie; Marian Rees
- Production locations: Black Hills of South Dakota; Savannah, Georgia
- Cinematography: Terry K. Meade
- Editor: Aaron Stell
- Running time: 153 minutes
- Production company: EMI Television

Original release
- Network: CBS
- Release: December 22, 1979

Orphan Train is an American TV movie directed by William Graham which was broadcast on CBS on December 22, 1979. It is based on the Orphan Train Movement, associated with the early days of Children's Aid and similar organizations.

== Plot ==
Emma Simms, niece of the late Reverend Simms, witnesses the execution by hanging of a teenage boy for theft and assaulting a policeman. Miss Simms is horrified that the city would kill someone that young and remembers her uncle's dream to take such children out west for a better life. She decides that she will raise the funds and take the children herself. She acquires a train car with the help of Frank Carlin, a reporter who wants to travel with them and chronicle the story of the orphan train.

The children traveling include Ben and Tony, Liverpool, JP (who is in fact a girl named Josephine), Sara, Mouse, Bruce, Annie, and Dutch, a young boy who speaks no English. As the train travels, they are delighted to see the mountains and hills, but Mr. Carlin informs them that the west will not be the fantasy life they dreamed it would be.

The train approaches its first stop of Kilgore, only to find that the Reverend Miss Simms wrote to about the children has left the area and there are no families waiting.

The next day, the train reaches the next train station, at which many people are gathered to see the children. Mouse, Dutch, and Bruce find homes. Meanwhile, JP seems uninterested in looking for a family, preferring to help Mr. Carlin take more photographs. She is disappointed that he will be going to California soon and hints that she would like to come with him. That night, Sara talks to Miss Simms, who reveals that her parents are dead, and Sara concludes that she is an orphan just like the children on the train.

The train reaches its next stop, Clayhorn, where a line of townspeople awaits their arrival, but before they can get off the train, Mr. Jed Clayhorn states that none of the children will be welcome in his town. He tells the townspeople that the children are beggars and troublemakers.

At the next stop, Deer Creek, Illinois, the town is having a celebration of their arrival with music, food, and dancing. Several more children are adopted, including Annie. Liverpool and Sara agree that they should both try to find families until they are grown up. A family wants to take Ben, but he will not leave Tony. Mr. Carlin gives JP a dress to wear and nicknames her Josie. The visit ends with a town square dance. Mr. Carlin leaves to take a stage to St Louis, promising to write a good story with a happy ending and saying a tearful goodbye to JP.

Soon after the train pulls away, a thunderstorm begins. Ahead, the tracks are severely damaged, and the conductor tells Miss Simms that a key part of the train is broken, and help may not arrive for days. The town of Mildred is only fifteen miles ahead. Miss Simms and the remaining children walk there for one last chance to get a family and get help. The townspeople hurry to meet them, embracing the children and welcoming them into their town.

== Cast and characters ==
- Jill Eikenberry as Emma Simms: A young woman who runs the New York City Children's Rescue Mission after her uncle, who originally ran the program, passes away. She decides to follow his plan to take city orphans on a train to the west to find loving homes and families for them. Throughout the journey, she faces many challenges, but never gives up.
- Kevin Dobson as Frank Carlin: A journalist and photographer who travels with the children in exchange for writing a story about their journey, He forms a special bond with JP.
- Linda Manz as Sarah: A young teenager who lives with Madam Flora. Miss. Simms buys her freedom and she travels on the train to the west and is adopted at the last stop.
- Graham Fletcher-Cook as Donald Liverpool: A young orphaned teenager who speaks with a Cockney accent. He is very independent and has a hard shell around him, but eventually warms up to the idea of being part of a loving family.
- Melissa Michaelsen as J.P.: A young girl who pretends to be a boy in order to sell newspapers. After her mother leaves town to travel with a man, she rides the orphan train and develops a special bond with Mr. Carlin.
- Charlie Fields as Mouse: A young boy who looks up to both Liverpool and Miss Simms. He is adopted early in the journey.
- Peter Neuman as Ben: A young Italian orphan who fears becoming separated from his brother, Tony
- John Femia as Tony: Ben's logical older brother
- Sara Inglis as Annie: A young girl with a limp who is afraid her disability will prevent people from wanting to adopt her
- Andreas Manske as Dutch: A German orphan who speaks no English. He is adopted by a German couple.
- Glenn Close as Jessica Martin: Miss. Simms's close friend who supports the journey by donating her jewelry for the cause
- Morgan Farley as Mr. McGarrity: An elderly gentleman who runs the mission with Miss. Simms
- Severn Darden as Mr. Barrington: A railroad man who reluctantly supplies a train car who the children to use
- Scott Rogers as Bruce: A strong teenage orphan who is taken in as a farmhand
- Justine Johnston as Mrs. Comstock
- Sue Ann Gilfillan as Mrs. Gardner
- Hallie Foote as Nellie (as Barbara Hallie-Foote)
- Mike Hammett as Danny: A fifteen-year-old boy and friend of Liverpool who is publicly hanged for stealing

== Production ==
The film's budget was $2.85 million. It was filmed on location in Georgia and South Dakota.
