= Can You Hear the Laughter? The Story of Freddie Prinze =

1979 American TV film

- Genre: Drama
- Based on: "Good Night Sweet Prinze" by Peter S. Greenberg
- Written by: Dalene Young
- Directed by: Burt Brinckerhoff
- Starring: Ira Angustain; Kevin Hooks; Randee Heller; Julie Carmen
- Music by: Peter Matz
- Country of origin: United States
- Original language: English

Production
- Executive producers: Roger Gimbel; Tony Converse
- Producer: Peter S. Greenberg
- Cinematography: Robert Caramico
- Editor: Aaron Stell
- Running time: 100 minutes
- Production companies: EMI Television; Roger Gimbel Productions

Original release
- Network: CBS
- Release: September 11, 1979

Can You Hear the Laughter? The Story of Freddie Prinze is a 1979 American made-for-television biographical drama film of the life of stand-up comedian and actor Freddie Prinze (portrayed by Ira Angustain). The teleplay by Dalene Young is based on a Playboy magazine article entitled "Good Night Sweet Prinze" by Peter S. Greenberg. The film was made without the cooperation of Prinze's mother or widow.

== Plot ==
At 19, Freddie Prinze (Ira Angustain) exploded on the entertainment scene. With the help of his friend, comedian David Brenner (Ken Sylk), Freddie's career catapulted from second-rate clubs in Manhattan to a prime time stardom on the 1970s television sitcom Chico and the Man as well as sell-out crowds in Las Vegas.

Although Freddie had fame, fortune, women, the leap into overnight stardom also brought with it a new set of problems. Freddie looked for love and approval in any way he could, but happiness and satisfaction eluded him. Finding no one to understand him, he turned inward and deeper into drugs.

== Cast ==
- Ira Angustain as Freddie Prinze
- Kevin Hooks as Nat Blake
- Randee Heller as Carol
- Julie Carmen as Rose
- Ken Sylk as David Brenner
- Devon Ericson as Kathy
- Stephen Elliott as Jonas
- James Callahan as Producer
- Mike Binder as Alan Bursky
- Annette Charles as Billy

== Production ==
The budget was $1.3 million.
