= List of Ultraman Orb episodes =

Cover of the first volume of Ultraman Orb Blu-ray release.

This is the episode list of Ultraman Orb (ウルトラマンオーブ, Urutoraman Ōbu), a Japanese tokusatsu television series produced by Tsuburaya Productions and aired on TV Tokyo. The series is slated to have 25 episodes in total and aired on TV Tokyo starting from July 9, 2016. Similar to its preceding series, Ultraman X, Orb is also simulcasted in North America via Crunchyroll site and APPs. A week after the end of Shin Ultraman Retsuden and before the premier of Ultraman Orb, a prologue special released on July 2, 2016.

At the end of each episode, a minisode called Gai's Ultra Hero Great Research (ガイのウルトラヒーロー大研究, Gai no Urutora Hīrō Dai-Kenkyū) aired and featuring Gai described the Ultra Fusion Card and the Monster Card of that episode. In accordance, the official website of Ultraman Orb would reveal each episode's references, easter eggs and in-jokes to past series in a segment called Find the Subtitle! (サブタイを探せ！, Sabutai o Sagase!).

The first episode aired on July 9, 2016, and the date is exactly 50 years after Birth of Ultraman (ウルトラマン誕生, Urutoraman Tanjō), the pre-premiere special of Ultraman which recorded on July 9, 1966, and later aired on Tokyo Broadcasting System (the Ultra Series' original network before TV Tokyo) the next day in 7:00 pm.

On July 1, 2016, Tsuburaya plans on releasing another batch of Blu-ray release of Ultra Series. Among the sets are Ultraman Ace, Ultraman Orb, Ultraman Zearth movies, Ultraman: Towards the Future and Ultraman: The Ultimate Hero. Ultraman Orb's Blu-ray is set to contain 26 episodes and would be separated into two volumes, with each volume contains three discs separately: the first volume will be sold on November 25, 2016, and the second and last volume will be sold at February 24, 2017. Both volumes costed around 22,000 Yen.

== Episodes ==
No.	Title (Note: English titles are taken from Crunchyroll. "King Demon Beast" that Crunchyroll used is replaced with "Lord Monster", the official translation of Maō-jū (魔王獣).)	Written by	Original release date
SP	"Ultraman Orb Preview Special"; Transliteration: "Urutoraman Ōbu Chokuzen Supesharu" (Japanese: ウルトラマンオーブ直前スペシャル)	Junichiro Ashiki	July 2, 2016
A brief description of the series narrated by Gai Kurenai. During the whole episode, Gai briefs in through the series' casts and story, before he moves on to Ultraman Orb's first three forms: Spacium Zeperion, Burnmite and Hurricane Slash by reviewing the Ultra Warriors used for each forms, while viewing through the Ultra Series' past media, including an original scene of Jack fighting against Alien Nackle. The whole episode ended with scenes of future episodes and Ultraman Orb's new form while the show's main opening song played.
1	"The Sunset Wanderer"; Transliteration: "Yūhi no Fūraibō" (Japanese: 夕陽の風来坊)	Takao Nakano	July 9, 2016
Sometime in the past, a strange giant of light fight against Maga-Zetton and ended the battle but the ensuing battle burned an entire forest and claimed the life of an eyewitness in an explosion. In the present day, SSP investigates a strange typhoon that responsible for the butterfly effect, which appeared alongside a mysterious giant bird. As they went investigating, their patrol car was caught in a cyclone and witnessed the monster Maga-Basser fighting against another giant before the latter saved their car. The next day, while SSP members went investigating again, Naomi was caught in a huge tornado until she was saved by Gai Kurenai. After handing her to Captain Shibukawa, Gai transformed into Ultraman Orb and defeated Maga-Basser before time runs out. Gai soon received Ultraman Mebius' card from Maga-Basser's crystal and walked away while Jugglus claimed the monster's card, asking of Orb is either the light of hope or the start of a darkness. This episode's segment for Gai's Ultra Hero Great Research features the cards of Ultraman Mebius and Maga-Basser. For the Find the Subtitle! segment, this episode is a tribute to Ultra Q episode 12, I Saw a Bird.
2	"The Lord of Earth (Note: The initial title is "The Earthen King Demon", as stated from this episode's preview in Crunchyroll's subtitle. Ironically, the new title features the word "Beast", despite the Japanese kanji for "beast" (獣, jū) is nowhere to be seen.)" Transliteration: "Tsuchikure no Maō" (Japanese: 土塊(つちくれ)の魔王)	Yuji Kobayashi	July 16, 2016
With viewer ratings of the SSP's official websites has no changes due to other media sites plagiarising them, the group decided to get a bigger scoop. Naomi entrusts the job to Jetta and Shin while she works on a part time job. Meanwhile, a giant sinkhole appears in the city, which was revealed to be the job of a Lord Monster of Earth. Gai faces against Jugglus, who uses Monster Cards to neutralise the Fusion Card that has been keeping the monster asleep before the latter escapes. As two more sinkholes appear, Shin discovers that the sinkholes are related to a feng shui system that was used by a past giant warrior to seal a giant monster below the city. If the fourth sinkhole appeared, then the qi that was made to seal it would be interrupted. Naomi tails Jugglus and was almost captured if it weren't for Gai's timely arrival but Jugglus sent the fourth Monster Card, which finally awaken Maga-Grand King from its sleep and destroyed all of the qi system used to seal it. After saving Naomi, Orb faces the monster but is at a great disadvantage due to its thick armor and laser beam until the giant used the monster's beam to penetrate its armor before launching Sperion Ray to finish it. While Gai claims Ultraman Taro's Ultra Fusion Card, Jugglus claimed the destroyed monster's card as well. Sometime later, the SSP bumps into Gai again and although telling them that knowing about him only brings great danger, the wanderer willingly reveals them his full name. This episode's segment for Gai's Ultra Hero Great Research features the cards of Ultraman Taro and Maga-Grand King. For the Find the Subtitle! segment, this episode is a tribute to Ultraman Max episode 21, Challenge from Underground.
3	"Monstrous Waters"; Transliteration: "Kaijū Suiiki" (Japanese: 怪獣水域)	Sotaro Hayashi	July 23, 2016
The whole town's supply of water suddenly polluted with foul stench. Shibukawa was forced to temporarily join the SSP after the VTL Squad gain no progress in their research. Gai tracks the source, which was revealed to be Maga-Jappa and had a brief scuffle with Jugglus Juggler. With the monster revealed to be the source, SSP and Shibukawa concluded that Maga-Jappa needed to be stop before it polluted the world's water supply. Using Shin's freezer gun, Shibukawa slowed down the monster but seemingly killed in its attack. Gai transforms into Ultraman Orb but with the monster's thick skin and foul stench, he changed into his new form Burnmite to counter it and finally put an end to the monster. Gai claims Ultraman Jack's card while Jugglus claimed Maga-Jappa, telling that he needed one more card to complete before Shibukawa reappeared unharmed from the attack. SSP and Gai soon went to the public bath after the battle ended. This episode's segment for Gai's Ultra Hero Great Research features the cards of Ultraman Jack and Maga-Jappa. For the Find the Subtitle! segment, this episode is a tribute to Ultra Seven episode 3, The Secret of the Lake.
4	"Beware of Fire in the Midsummer Sky"; Transliteration: "Manatsu no Sora ni Hinoyōjin" (Japanese: 真夏の空に火の用心)	Akio Miyoshi	July 30, 2016
A heatwave of the temperature of 40 degree Celsius plagued the whole city. During that time, a mysterious fireball appeared in the sky, which was made by the Lord Monster of Fire, Maga-Pandon. After failing to put out the fireball, Orb pushed it away from the outer space before his time runs out and return to his human form. He was quickly treated by SSP in their base, and is advised to stay in bed due to his high fever. VTL Squad attacked the fireball with freezing missiles but to no avail and Maga-Pandon started to return to Earth. Inspired by Naomi's words, Gai/Orb uses Burnmite and created an explosion to cancel Maga-Pandon's fireball before defeating it with Sperion Ray. Gai claimed Ultraman Zero's card while Jugglus claim Maga-Pandon and commences that his collection is complete. This episode's segment for Gai's Ultra Hero Great Research features the cards of Ultraman Zero and Maga-Pandon. For the Find the Subtitle! segment, this episode is a tribute to Ultraman Gaia episode 28, The Advent of Heatwave.
5	"A Heart That Won't Run Away"; Transliteration: "Nigenai Kokoro" (Japanese: 逃げない心)	Hirotoshi Kobayashi	August 6, 2016
Alien Zetton Maddock kidnapped Naomi by disguising as a school girl and lured her after finishing a part time job. At the SSP base, Gai simultaneously received this news and rescued her in a factory. As Hyper Zetton Deathscythe appear and Orb discover it possessing knowledge of his past forms, Orb assumed Hurricane Slash and finally destroyed the monster with Big Bang Thrust. Gai defeated Maddock by repelling his own attack and the latter revealed that killing Gai would earn him a reputation before dying from his injuries. Naomi offered Gai a refuge in SSP Base, which he accepted. This episode's segment for Gai's Ultra Hero Great Research features the cards of Ultraman X and Gomora. For the Find the Subtitle! segment, this episode is a tribute to Ultraman episode 31, Who Goes There?.
6	"The Forbidden Forest"; Transliteration: "Hairazu no Mori" (Japanese: 入らずの森)	Takao Nakano	August 13, 2016
Jugglus Juggler introduced himself to a group of invading aliens called Planetary Invasion Syndicate and proposes an alliance. Meanwhile, Shibukawa seeks the help from SSP of reports of a UFO sightings in a forbidden forest, which was stated in an urban legend that nobody has ever get out survived. While wandering in the forest, SSP and Shibukawa are under attacked by Alien Nackle Nagus, who brought along two other henchmen as they trapped the entire forest into a dimensional subspace and planned to kill them for intruding their hideout. Although escaped thanks to the Princess Tamayura, SSP and Shibukawa are still targeted until Gai arrives and rescue them. Jugglus summons Aribunta for the Planetary Invasion Syndicate to escape while said Super Beast was killed by Ultraman Orb. After the battle, while Jugglus take his leave, the syndicate's leader, Don Nostra, plans to betray Jugglus and claim his possession of Lord Monster Monster Cards while holding an Ultraman Belial Ultra Fusion Card. Jugglus simply watched the group's saucer departing and is well aware of their leader's treacherous plot on him. This episode's segment for Gai's Ultra Hero Great Research features the cards of Ultraman Ginga and Alien Mefilas. For the Find the Subtitle! segment, this episode is a tribute to Ultra Seven episode 6, Dark Zone.
7	"A Future Shrouded in Fog"; Transliteration: "Kiri no Naka no Ashita" (Japanese: 霧の中の明日)	Yuji Kobayashi	August 20, 2016
SSP called Haruka Kirishima, a woman with precognition abilities for an interview and wished to her abilities to use but refused due to it being a burden since her childhood. Gai visited her (who knows of his identity as Ultraman Orb) and advise her to move on, as well as revealing his own past. She predicted of a monster named Hoe attacking the city and Gai/Ultraman Orb defeated from its attack. The next day during Hoe's attack, Haruka prevented Gai from transforming but was soon revealed that Hoe is in fact her own creation from the sorrows of her abilities. While Ultraman Orb was fighting the monster, Naomi and Gais words made Haruka moving on and saved Orb from his fated defeat, therefore weakening Hoe long enough for the Ultra Warrior to finish him. The next day, she thanked Naomi and Gai before revealing to the latter of an "ominous" dream she had on him. This episode's segment for Gai's Ultra Hero Great Research features the cards of Ultraman Victory and Hoe. For the Find the Subtitle! segment, this episode is a tribute to Ultra Seven episode 23, Find Tomorrow.
8	"The Urban Merman"; Transliteration: "Tokai no Hangyojin" (Japanese: 都会の半魚人)	Hirotoshi Kobayashi	August 27, 2016
A parent-child pair Ragon was sheltered in the shop of a fishmonger named Genzaburo, who took care of them after the fish suppky on the sea depleted. When the Ragon pair were sighted by several local civilians, Genzaburo decided to bring them away to sea safely after VTL Squad gets involved with the case too. By chance, SSP also offered them their help until the appearance of Gubila threatened them, wanting to eat the Ragon family. When the Ragon child was eaten, Ultraman Orb appeared and saved it before bringing Gubila far away from the city. In the end, SSP and Shibukawa accompanied Genzaburo to bring the Ragon family back to the sea. This episode's segment for Gai's Ultra Hero Great Research features the cards of Ultraman Dyna and Gubila. For the Find the Subtitle! segment, this episode is a tribute to Ultraman episode 6, The Coast Guard Command.
9	"The Impostor Blues"; Transliteration: "Nisemono no Burūsu" (Japanese: ニセモノのブルース)	Takao Nakano	September 3, 2016
The Planetary Invasion Syndicate has called upon Alien Babarue Babaryu to impersonate Ultraman Orb and ruin his reputation as Earth's savior. But while Babaryu tried to do so, the spontaneous appearance of a Telesdon ruined the plan and left Babaryu to fend for himself. During that time, he accidentally shielded the children from Telesdon before the monster got away and him retreating in his human. By mistake, Jetta believed him as the real Orb and had him played with several children. When the Planetary Invasion Syndicate ordered Babaryu to resume his activity, he refused due to his time as a human gave him a change of heart and fought a Cherubim summoned by Jugglus before the real Orb appeared and destroy it. Although exposed as an impostor, Babaryu was thanked by Jetta and several children before he disappeared and was revealed to have restart his new life as a cleaner. This episode's segment for Gai's Ultra Hero Great Research features the cards of Ultraman Cosmos and Cherubim. For the Find the Subtitle! segment, this episode is a tribute to Ultra Q episode 21, Space Directive M774.
10	"Juggler Dies!"; Transliteration: "Jagurā Shisu!" (Japanese: ジャグラー死す！)	Yuji Kobayashi	September 10, 2016
Nostra strikes a deal with Jugglus to defeat Ultraman Orb and took his Ultra Fusion Cards in exchange of Belial's card. Jugglus challenged Gai in a one-on-one match the next day and summoned Black King to fight Orb before he was killed by Nagus, who was revealed to have sent by Nostra to assassinate Jugglus for his Monster Cards. Orb quickly finished Black King after that and while the Planetary Invasion Syndicate celebrated their victory, Jugglus revealed to have survived via Bemstar's card and quickly killed Nagus, later Nostra in his true form. Now in possession of Belial's card, Jugglus laughs as he now has a complete collection. This episode's segment for Gai's Ultra Hero Great Research features the cards of Ultraman Max and Jugglus Juggler. For the Find the Subtitle! segment, this episode is a tribute to The Return of Ultraman episode 1, All Monsters Attack.
11	"Trouble! Mama Is Here!"; Transliteration: "Taihen! Mama ga Kita!" (Japanese: 大変！ママが来た！)	Hisako Kurosawa	September 17, 2016
Naomi asked for Gai's help to pretend to be her boyfriend in a meeting with her mother. During that time, Jugglus appeared as well to reveal the Lord Monster Monster Cards he had and thanked Gai for his "help" with Princess Tamayura appeared as well to warn Gai of a new threat. When rushing towards the forbidden forest, Gai had a short scuffle with Jugglus before the latter used his Lord Monster and Belial's cards to awaken Maga-Orochi. Ultraman Orb tries to stop the monster in all of his forms but was defeated. With Gai laid unconscious, Jugglus took his Ultra Fusion Cards and gloated over his victory. This episode's segment for Gai's Ultra Hero Great Research features the cards of Zoffy and Maga-Orochi. For the Find the Subtitle! segment, this episode is a tribute to Ultraman episode 19, Demons Rise Again.
12	"The Dark King's Blessing"; Transliteration: "Kuroki Ō no Shukufuku" (Japanese: 黒き王の祝福)	Hisako Kurosawa	September 24, 2016
With Gai's possession of Ultra Fusion Cards being stolen, he is left defenseless with Maga-Orochi, who was previously sleeping awakens and tries to continue rampaging the urban area. Accompanied by Naomi's mother, SSP rushed to the forbidden forest and re-combine the previously shattered headstone of Tamayura. The princess emerged from Keiko's plant and rushes to Gai, providing him with Zoffy and Belial's cards. With Gai unable to use Belial, she purposely lower her defenses and for Maga-Orochi to eliminate her, causing Belial to finally cooperate with a vengeful Gai and transforms into Ultraman Orb. As Thunder Breastar, Orb violently attacked Maga-Orochi before defeating it with Zettium Ray. Jugglus, who was enraged that Gai won again reluctantly return his cards and warns the wanderer that the two of them are no longer different. This episode's segment for Gai's Ultra Hero Great Research features the cards of Ultraman Belial and Black King. For the Find the Subtitle! segment, this episode is a tribute to Ultraman episode 8, The Lawless Monster Zone.
13	"Cleanup of the Heart"; Transliteration: "Kokoro no Ōsōji" (Japanese: 心の大掃除)	Junichiro Ashiki	October 1, 2016
SSP cleans up their office and recalled events from past episodes. Gai and Shibukawa eventually joined them, with Tarude, the last surviving member of Planetary Invasion Syndicate recalled of how Jugglus killed Nostra and Nagus in hopes of using Belial's card, which eventually fall into Gai's possession. He soon cursed Jugglus for killing his comrades. Before the episode ended, Gai witnessing Shibukawa and SSP taking a rest after their work and remembers of how Naomi offered him a refuge in their office. For the Find the Subtitle! segment, this episode is a tribute to The Ultraman episode 1, Birth of a New Hero.
14	"Justice Out of Control"; Transliteration: "Bōsō Suru Seigi" (Japanese: 暴走する正義)	Sotaro Hayashi	October 8, 2016
Gai was forced to take the job of SSP's cameraman after Shin went off in his part time job at the Kofune Manufacturing. While its workers were taking a break, a strange robot (later named Galactron by Naomi) fell from the sky. The workers and VTL Squad decided to analyze the robot but the next day, it awakened and captured Naomi as it went on a rampaging spree to cleanse the Earth from its errors. Orb tries to fight the robot and save Naomi but was quickly defeated. This episode's segment for Gai's Ultra Hero Great Research features the cards of Ultraseven and Maga-Zetton. For the Find the Subtitle! segment, this episode is a tribute to Ultraman episode 34, A Gift from the Sky.
15	"Never Say Never"; Transliteration: "Nebā Sei Nebā" (Japanese: ネバー・セイ・ネバー)	Hirotoshi Kobayashi	October 15, 2016
Following Orb's defeat by Galactron, the robot warned the Ultra not to interfere with its job before he reduced to his human form Gai. With means of negotiations being useless, VTL Squad start to take on countermeasures. Seeing how destructive Galactron has become, Gai had no choice but to use Thunder Breastar again. The Ultraman not only take a brutal payback towards Galactron but also attacked a nearby Z-VTOL and had almost killed Naomi after destroying it. With Naomi hospitalized, Gai rushed to her side and commenced that he and the rest of her friends would never forgive Orb for his actions. As Shin fells into depression, Soichi advises him not to let his depression over him and to move on. Picking up Belial's card, Gai wonders if he is worthy of such power. This episode's segment for Gai's Ultra Hero Great Research features the cards of Ultraman Tiga and Galactron. For the Find the Subtitle! segment, this episode is a tribute to Ultraman Great episode 13, An Eternal Hero.
16	"A Unforgettable Place"; Transliteration: "Wasurerarenai Basho" (Japanese: 忘れられない場所)	Uiko Miura	October 22, 2016
Sometime later, Naomi slowly recovers from her injuries but the news of her being Galactron's victim caught the attention of multiple newscaster. Apart from that, Orb's notoriety in both knocking out a Z-VTOL and inability to save Naomi earn him a notoriety in the public. While visiting Naomi, Jetta and Shin revealed her of a footage from a mysterious explosion in Rusalka 108 years ago from a mysterious explosion, hinting that aside from Orb, other Ultraman existed. It was also then where Keiko revealed to Naomi of her great-great-grandmother originated from Rusalka before migrating to Japan. Gai visited Rusalka and recollected the events from 108 years prior where he was saved by Natasha, a girl he soon befriended until she died in a crossfire between Ultraman Orb and Maga-Zetton. Juggler expected Gai's arrival and revealed Maga-Orochi's tail that Orb as Thunder Breastar yanked off a long time ago to combine it with the cards of Zetton and Pandon, forming Zeppandon. Orb faced this monster but to no avail as Juggler coerce him to use Belial's power again. Still refusing Thunder Breastar's power, he used Burnmite's Stobium Dynamite and escape the battle, meeting Natasha's spirit, who transformed into Naomi's look-alike to give Gai a blank card before leaving. Meanwhile in Japan, Juggler made his way to Naomi's ward. This episode's segment for Gai's Ultra Hero Great Research features the cards of Ultraman Gaia and Lord Monsters. For the Find the Subtitle! segment, this episode is a tribute to Ultra Seven episode 47, Who Are You?.
17	"The Holy Sword, Restored"; Transliteration: "Fukkatsu no Seiken" (Japanese: 復活の聖剣)	Yuji Kobayashi	October 29, 2016
Gai was able to save Naomi moments before Jugglus assassinate her. Taking shelter in a warehouse, Gai discovers from Naomi's salvaged matryoshka that Natasha survived the explosion in Rusalka and moved to Japan, with Naomi was revealed to be her descendant. While VTL Squad labels Orb as a public enemy, Juggler brought Zeppandon and challenged Gai again. Having no longer fear of darkness, Gai utilizes Thunder Breastar in full control and fought Zeppandon despite being targets of Z-VTOL squadron. Naomi bravely approached Orb and declared that she has no fear for him and thanks the giant for saving her before. As Zeppandon open fires at Orb, the Ultra shielded the SSP members, allowing him to regain his reputation. Naomi hums Gai's melody for him to regain faith on himself and finally helping Orb regains his true form, Orb Origin. Zeppandon was defeated by the Ultraman's new strength and caused Juggler to lose his Dark Ring. This episode's segment for Gai's Ultra Hero Great Research features the cards of Orb Origin and Zeppandon. For the Find the Subtitle! segment, this episode is a tribute to Ultraman episode 39, Farewell, Ultraman.
18	"Hard-Boiled River"; Transliteration: "Hādoboirudo Ribā" (Japanese: ハードボイルドリバー)	Daiki Seto	November 5, 2016
To help Shibukawa mend his relationship with his daughter Tetsuko, SSP brought her along to spy on Shibukawa's work. Seeing Shibukawa facing her boyfriend Takahiro, Tetsuko emerged and lashed her father before the man revealed himself as Alien Shaplay and stole her energies to empower his Bemular. Gai as Orb faced the monster while Shibukawa faced Shaplay and wins by luring him into oil canister to blow him. In the end, it seemed that Shibukawa's relation with his daughter improved and Alien Shaplay survived the explosion before he was killed by Juggler. This episode's segment for Gai's Ultra Hero Great Research features the cards of Ultraman Agul and Bemular. For the Find the Subtitle! segment, this episode is a tribute to Ultra Seven episode 22, The Human Ranch.
19	"The Demon Inside of Me"; Transliteration: "Watashi no Naka no Oni" (Japanese: 私の中の鬼)	Uiko Miura	November 12, 2016
After being humiliated by several guests at Yoko's engagement ceremony, Naomi accidentally awakened Renki with her jealousy over her own friend. Realising what she had done, Naomi, SSP and Shibukawa tried to cancel her wedding and it took Renki's own arrival to convince the guests. As Orb fought the giant ghost, Naomi spoke with Renki, allowing him to surrender himself and peacefully disappeared. This episode's segment for Gai's Ultra Hero Great Research features the cards of Ultraman Ace and Renki. For the Find the Subtitle! segment, this episode is a tribute to The Return of Ultraman episode 50, Invitation From Hell.
20	"Revenge's Trigger"; Transliteration: "Fukushū no Hikigane" (Japanese: 復讐の引き金)	Hiroki Uchida	November 19, 2016
In hopes of avenging the Planetary Invasion Syndicate, Tarude attacked Juggler before Gai's intervention allowed his nemesis to get away, being tended by Naomi when the two bumped to each others by chance. His saucer caught the attention of SSP and Shibukawa to investigate it and Tarude warned Gai not to interfere in his conquest for vengeance again but the latter refused when Naomi's life also put in danger. This caused Tarude and Orb to battle at the city's dusk skyline and trading blows with each others before the giant hero killed the alien. Juggler left Naomi after he reclaimed his stolen Katana and mentioned that a great darkness is sleeping beneath the Earth. This episode's segment for Gai's Ultra Hero Great Research features the cards of Ultraman Hikari and Alien Metron. For the Find the Subtitle! segment, this episode is a tribute to Ultra Seven episode 45, The Boy Who Cried Flying Saucer.
21	"The Girl with the Blue Ribbon"; Transliteration: "Aoi Ribon no Shōjo" (Japanese: 青いリボンの少女)	Sachio Yanai	November 26, 2016
Ever since the last months, the sightings of Hyper Zetton Deathscythe and a mysterious blue-ribboned girl circulates around the internet. Tracking their current location to the elderly Iwaki couple household, SSP soon discovered Hyper Zetton on the city's skyline and spotted the same girl fighting with Gai again before she loses consciousness and the monster disappeared. While mysterious girl Maya returned to the Iwaki household, SSP and Shibukawa learns of their connection quickly and Gai visited their house again. During that time, she attacked Gai and revealed herself to be artificial life form made from Alien Zetton Maddock, but the alien's consciousness were overloaded with memories of Gai and Naomi causing Maya's original self to continuously rebelling his will. While Ultraman Orb fought against Deathscythe, Maya destroyed Maddock and her controller bracelet at the cost of her own memories. This allows Deathscythe to be weakened for Orb Thunder Breastar to destroy it. After the battle, Maya was reawakened with no memories of her encounter with the Iwake couple and decided to travel around the world while promising to return someday. This episode's segment for Gai's Ultra Hero Great Research features the cards of Ultraman Tiga Sky Type and Hyper Zetton Deathscythe. For the Find the Subtitle! segment, this episode is a tribute to Ultraman Leo episode 45, The Phantom Girl.
22	"The Unmarked Café"; Transliteration: "Chizu ni Nai Kafe" (Japanese: 地図にないカフェ)	Kyoko Katsuya	December 3, 2016
When news of the mysterious Café Black Star reach SSP, they decided to investigate it but was forced to exit when they tried to investigate more about it. Later it was revealed that the café was solely meant for non-human beings, and that Gai and Juggler were among his regular customers. When its owner Manager Black closed it and tried to peacefully leave the Earth, his partner Nova refused to let go of their unfulfilled ambition to invade the Earth and rampaged across the city, with Manager Black joined in, revealed to be the Black Directive. Orb fought Nova and destroyed it, leaving Black Directive as the sole survivor until Gai console his grief over Nova's loss, telling that he still has his customers that liked him. It was soon revealed that he opened a Ramen business, which attract the attention of Shibukawa and SSP once more. This episode's segment for Gai's Ultra Hero Great Research features the cards of Ultraman Leo and Zetton. For the Find the Subtitle! segment, this episode is a tribute to The Return of Ultraman episode 44, To the Starry Sky With Love.
23	"The Blade of Darkness"; Transliteration: "Yami no Yaiba" (Japanese: 闇の刃)	Shuji Yuki	December 10, 2016
Juggler spent more time perfecting his killer move by delivering slash attacks to the building. Still wanting to prove himself greater than Gai, he eventually revealed his attack in the public and release the darkness from beneath the Earth to become giant. Gai faced Juggler as Ultraman Orb, using Thunder Breastar and later Orb Origin to engage in a sword combat. As Juggler seemingly won, Orb rises again and defeated him with a single blow, claiming that his strength comes from the need to protect others. While Gai reunites with SSP, Juggler on the other hand was captured by the VTL Squad led by Shibukawa and a fleet of Z-VTOL. This episode's segment for Gai's Ultra Hero Great Research features the cards of Ultraman and Jugglus Juggler. For the Find the Subtitle! segment, this episode is a tribute to The Return of Ultraman episode 27, Go to Hell With This One Blow.
24	"The Ultimate Lord Monster Strikes Back"; Transliteration: "Gyakushū no Chō Dai Maō-jū" (Japanese: 逆襲の超大魔王獣)	Yuji Kobayashi	December 17, 2016
Strange incidents happen in Tokyo, such as the immediate rise and death of three monsters, an intense heatwave during December and sea monsters and aliens departing from Japan. Jetta and Shin visited the Kishine residence, who entrusted them with the original copy of Pacific Records, believing them as the book's true owners. Meanwhile, Juggler confessed to the VTL Squad Japan's executives that Maga-Orochi, the monster which was thought be dead had its spirit descended to the Earth's crust and that it will arise as Magatano-Orochi, consuming the entire Earth in its rampaging spree. With two hours left for preparation, an evacuation was ordered in Japan and Juggler told them that the only way to stop the monster's revival is to destroy its chrysalis. The team does so by launching their ICBM Spiner R-1 but realises too late that they were tricked and the missile was used to accelerate the revival process, bringing Magatano-Orochi towards the surface. Gai/Orb faced the monster but was overpowered and Jetta and Shin was caught in the battle's explosion when they try to come closer to find its weakness. With Juggler escaped his confinement, he approaches Gai and slain Naomi in front of the wanderer's own eyes. For the Find the Subtitle! segment, this episode is a tribute to Ultra Seven episode 38, The Courageous Battle.
25	"The Wandering Sun"; Transliteration: "Sasurai no Taiyō" (Japanese: さすらいの太陽)	Takao Nakano	December 24, 2016
Naomi was held captive by Juggler, who proceed to kill her in front of Gai. When he was hesitating to do so after she willingly took responsibility of her own death, Juggler rescued her from a crashed Z-VTOL, revealing himself to be Natasha's rescuer in the past. Jetta and Shin discover that Magatano-Orochi is actually imperfect due to part of its energy was blocked by the sacred tree that Maga-Orochi trampled sometime ago. After being rescued, they relay this info to Shibukawa and Orb, as Z-VTOL fleet attacked the monster's weak-spot, followed by Juggler holding Magatano-Orochi for Orb to decimate with the power of past Ultra Warriors. After the battle, Gai left to parts unknown while assuring Naomi (who already knew his true identity from the start) that he would return when the time needed. For the Find the Subtitle! segment, this episode is a tribute to Ultra Q episode 28, Open Up!.
