= Estelle Getty =

American actress (1923–2008)

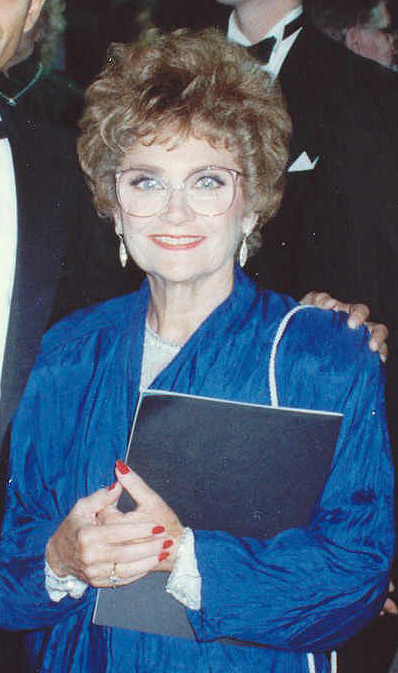
- Getty in 1989
- Born: Estelle Scher; July 25, 1923; New York City, U.S.
- Died: July 22, 2008 (aged 84); Los Angeles, California, U.S.
- Resting place: Hollywood Forever Cemetery
- Occupations: Actress; comedian
- Years active: 1940s–2001
- Notable work: The Golden Girls; The Golden Palace; Empty Nest; Mannequin
- Spouse: Arthur Gettleman (m. 1947; died 2004)
- Children: 2

Estelle Gettleman (née Scher; July 25, 1923 – July 22, 2008), known professionally as Estelle Getty, was an American actress and comedian. She was best known for her portrayal of Sophia Petrillo on The Golden Girls (1985–1992), for which she won a Golden Globe Award for Best Actress – Television Series Musical or Comedy and a Primetime Emmy Award for Outstanding Supporting Actress in a Comedy Series. She reprised the role in Empty Nest (1993–1995), The Golden Palace (1992–1993), Blossom (1990–1995), and Nurses (1991–1994).

Notable films in which she appeared include Mask (1985), a semibiographical film in which she played the grandmother of Roy L. Dennis, Mannequin (1987), and Stuart Little (1999). She retired from acting in 2001 due to failing health, and died in 2008 from dementia with Lewy bodies.

== Early life, family and education ==
Getty was born Estelle Scher in New York City on July 25, 1923, to Charles Scher (Yiddish: טשאַרלס שער) and Sarah (née Lacher; Yiddish: שרה לאַכער שער), Jewish immigrants from Poland, at the family's apartment at 257 East 2nd Street on the Lower East Side, which also served as the storefront for the family's glass business. She had a sister Rosilyn "Roz" Scher Howard, and a brother Samuel "David" Scher. As a child, she was known as Etty, a nickname that stemmed from her sister's inability to pronounce "Estelle" correctly, and it stuck with her throughout her life. Her father owned and operated his own business, installing glass windows into automobiles and trucks, and her mother was a homemaker. As a weekly treat, every Friday night, her father would take their family to the Academy of Music on 14th Street to watch a film and a live vaudeville performance, and while watching those performances, Getty decided she wanted to become an actor.

She graduated from Seward Park High School.

== Career ==
After graduating from high school, Estelle continued to live at home with her parents. Her father was doubtful she would be able to forge a successful career in acting. She worked as a secretary, as the hours allowed for her to attend auditions in the late afternoon and evening while having an income.

For years, Getty won roles in the New York theater circuit, while simultaneously holding a job and raising her two sons, but she struggled to gain notice for her talent. Finally, in 1982, nearing 60 years old, she found her breakthrough role as Mrs. Beckoff in the Broadway production of Torch Song Trilogy, a character that playwright Harvey Fierstein had created specifically with her in mind. She received widespread praise for her appearance in the play—including a Drama Desk Award nomination—and went on to reprise the role in both Broadway and off-Broadway productions for four years. In 1985, the role heavily influenced Witt/Thomas/Harris Productions to cast Getty for the role of Sophia Petrillo on NBC's new sitcom, The Golden Girls. Getty relied on wigs, clothing, and heavy makeup to age herself to look the part of a mother in her 80s. In reality, she was a year younger than her television daughter, Bea Arthur, who played Dorothy Zbornak. In 1988, Getty won her most notable award, the Primetime Emmy Award for Outstanding Supporting Actress in a Comedy Series, for her work on the show.

The Golden Girls ended in 1992 after seven seasons (six of the seven seasons in the top 10 of the Nielsen ratings) due to Arthur wishing to explore new projects. That fall, Getty, McClanahan, and White starred in the show's spin-off, The Golden Palace, for one season before its cancellation. Getty then appeared in Empty Nest, Nurses, Blossom, Touched by an Angel, Mad About You, and The Nanny. Her other television and film appearances prior to and during the filming of The Golden Girls included the TV series Fantasy Island, Cagney & Lacey and Newhart, and the films Tootsie (1982), Mask (1985) and Mannequin (1987), and a starring role in Stop! Or My Mom Will Shoot (1992). Her final film role was Stuart Little (1999).

During her time on The Golden Girls, Getty wrote her autobiography, If I Knew Then, What I Know Now... So What?, with the help of Steve Delsohn, published by Contemporary Books in 1988. She also released an exercise video for senior citizens in 1993.

== Personal life ==
=== Family ===
Getty was introduced to Arthur Gettleman, whose last name she later used as the basis for her stage name, at a party by her friends from the New York theater circuit. The two married nine months later on December 21, 1947. They had two sons together, and remained married until his death on September 24, 2004, at the age of 85. After they married, the two lived in the Bronx for a time, and, after the births of their children, moved to Oakland Gardens, Queens, living in a liberal-minded cooperative built for Jewish veterans of World War II called Bell Park Gardens, while Arthur ran her father's glass installation company in New York, and later Miami. The two had a "commuter marriage" for some time from the mid-1980s to mid-1990s, as Getty moved to California to work on The Golden Girls.

=== HIV/AIDS activism ===
Getty was said by friends Harvey Fierstein and Rosie O'Donnell, both notable members of the LGBT community, to have been heavily involved in HIV/AIDS activism and had lost close friends and family to the disease, among them her nephew Steven Scher (1962–1992), whom she cared for after he was diagnosed with HIV/AIDS, and her Torch Song Trilogy co-star Court Miller (1952–1986).

== Death ==
Getty died in the early morning of July 22, 2008, at her home in Los Angeles, aged 84, from the result of Lewy body dementia, according to her family. She was buried in Hollywood Forever Cemetery, her headstone inscribed with the words "With Love and Laughter" and a Star of David to indicate her Jewish faith. Bea Arthur, Betty White, and Rue McClanahan, her co-stars from The Golden Girls were saddened by her loss; previously in a 2004 interview, they said that her disease had progressed to the point where she was not able to hold conversations with them or recognize them. Ultimately, they didn't attend her funeral. She had reportedly started to show signs of dementia during the filming of the television series, when, despite more than three decades of theater work, she began to struggle to remember her lines, and in later seasons of the show, had to rely on cue cards. Getty also suffered from osteoporosis, and was also thought to have Parkinson's disease. This diagnosis was ultimately changed to dementia with Lewy bodies.

== Filmography ==
=== Film ===
Year	Title	Role	Notes
1978	Team-Mates	Teacher	
1982	Tootsie	Middle Aged Woman	
1983	Deadly Force	Gussie	
1984	No Man's Land	Eurol Miller	TV movie
1984	Victims for Victims: The Theresa Saldana Story		TV movie
1985	Mask	Evelyn Steinberg	
1985	Copacabana	Bella Stern	TV movie
1987	Mannequin	Mrs. Claire Timkin	
1992	Stop! Or My Mom Will Shoot	Mrs. Tutti Bomowski	Razzie Award for Worst Supporting Actress
1997	A Match Made in Heaven	Betty Weston	TV movie
1999	The Sissy Duckling	Mrs. Hennypecker	Voice, TV movie
1999	Stuart Little	Grandma Estelle	Final film role

=== Television ===
Year	Title	Role	Notes
1981	Nurse	Sadie Mandler	Episode: "Equal Opportunity"
1982	Baker's Dozen	Mrs. Locasale	Episode: "Dear John"
1984	Fantasy Island	Money Lady	Episode: "The Match Maker"
1984	Cagney & Lacey	Mrs. Rosenmeyer	Episode: "Baby Broker"
1984	Hotel	Roberta Abrams	Episode: "Intimate Strangers"
1985	Newhart	Miriam the Librarian	Episode: "What Makes Dick Run"
1985–1992	The Golden Girls	Sophia Petrillo	180 episodes American Comedy Award for Funniest Supporting Female in a Television Series (1991, 1992); Golden Globe Award for Best Actress – Television Series Musical or Comedy (1986); Primetime Emmy Award for Outstanding Supporting Actress in a Comedy Series (1988); Nominated—Golden Globe Award for Best Actress – Television Series Musical or Comedy (1987); Nominated—Golden Globe Award for Best Supporting Actress – Series, Miniseries or Television Film (1992); Nominated—Primetime Emmy Award for Outstanding Supporting Actress in a Comedy Series (1986–87, 1989–92)
1987	Roomies	Mama	Episode: "Mid-Term Fever"
1990	City	Helen Rutledge	Episode: "Seems Like Old Times"
1990	The Earth Day Special	Sophia Petrillo	TV special
1991	The Fanelli Boys	Dr. Newman	Episode: "Doctor, Doctor"
1991	Blossom	Sophia Petrillo	Episode: "I Ain't Got No Buddy"
1992–1993	The Golden Palace	Sophia Petrillo	24 episodes
1993	Nurses	Sophia Petrillo	Episode: "Temporary Setbacks"
1988–1995	Empty Nest	Sophia Petrillo	52 episodes
1996	Touched by an Angel	Dottie	Episode: "The Sky Is Falling"
1996	Brotherly Love	Myrna Burwell	Episode: "Motherly Love"
1997	Mad About You	Paul's Aunt Ida	Episode: "The Birth: Part 1"
1997	Duckman	Aunt Jane	Voice, Episode: "Westward, No!"
1998	The Nanny	Herself	Episode: "Making Whoopi"
2000	Ladies Man	Sophia Gates	Episode: "Romance"
2000	It's Like, You Know...	Herself	Episode: "Lust for Life" (unaired)
2001	Intimate Portrait	Herself	Episode: "Estelle Getty" (final appearance)

=== Theater ===
Year	Title	Role	Notes
1982	Torch Song Trilogy	Mrs. Beckoff	

=== Exercise video ===
Year	Title	Role
1993	Young at Heart: Body Conditioning with Estelle	Herself

== Book ==
- Getty, Estelle (with Steve Delsohn). (1988) If I Knew Then What I Know Now ... So What. Chicago: Contemporary Books. ISBN 0-8092-4474-8
