= Broken Promise (1981 film) =

- Genre: Drama
- Written by: Stephen Kandel
- Directed by: Don Taylor
- Starring: Chris Sarandon; Melissa Michaelsen; George Coe; David Haskell
- Music by: Fred Karlin
- Country of origin: United States
- Original language: English

Production
- Executive producers: Tony Converse; Roger Gimbel
- Producers: Joe Boston; Don Taylor
- Cinematography: Robert C. Jessup
- Editor: David Berlatsky
- Running time: 96 minutes
- Production companies: EMI Television; Roger Gimbel Productions

Original release
- Network: CBS
- Release: May 5, 1981

Broken Promise is a 1981 American made-for-television drama film starring Chris Sarandon.

== Cast ==
- Chris Sarandon as Bud Griggs
- Melissa Michaelsen as Patty Clawson
- George Coe as George Mathews
- McKee Anderson as Nancy Sloan
- David Haskell as Tom Parks
- Sondra West as Alice Parks
- Marc Alaimo as Joe Clawson
