= Grace Parr =

Grace Parr may refer to:

- Grace Parr (1905–1989), American Australian radio entrepreneur, executive and producer, also known as Grace Gibson
- Grace Parr (actress), Australian film and television actress
