= Ruth Dyer =

American engineer

Ruth A. Dyer is a retired American engineer and academic administrator, formerly the senior vice provost for academic affairs and senior vice president of Kansas State University. Her publications have included works on the use of Hadamard transforms in spectrometry, and on the mentorship of women in engineering.

== Education and career ==
Dyer was a student of biochemistry at Kansas State University. After earning bachelor's and master's degrees in 1973 and 1975 respectively, and starting a doctoral program, she left Kansas State when her husband, computer engineer Stephen A. Dyer, became a faculty member at Georgetown College in Kentucky. Her previous work could not be transferred to the University of Kentucky, so instead she changed fields, earning a Ph.D. in mechanical engineering there in 1980.

By this time, her husband had moved to the University of Kentucky, and she took a part-time position there as an instructor in electrical engineering. In 1983, the Dyers solved their two-body problem by returning to Kansas State in the college of engineering. Ruth Dyer joined the Eepartment of Electrical and Computer Engineering, becoming the only woman in the college to hold a Ph.D. in engineering. In 1997, she was promoted to full professor. She became assistant provost in 2000, associate provost in 2004, interim provost and vice president for academic affairs in 2009, and senior vice provost in 2010.

As 2016–2017 president of the IEEE Instrumentation and Measurement Society, Dyer worked "intentionally, strategically, and systematically" to encourage greater diversity within the society. Following this term she became director of IEEE Division II, which encompasses six of IEEE's member societies.

She retired in 2018, to become a professor emeritus.

== Recognition ==
Dyer became a Fellow of the Association for Women in Science in 2006, and was named an IEEE Fellow in 2008, "for contributions to diversity in science and engineering education, and Hadamard-transform spectrometers".

The IEEE Instrumentation and Measurement Society gave Dyer their 2011 Distinguished Service Award. In 2013 she was inducted into the University of Kentucky College of Engineering Hall of Distinction.
