= Boomer the dog =

Boomer the dog may refer to:

- the mascot of Port Vale F.C.
- a character in the American TV show Here's Boomer
