= Robyn Bliley =

1972American television and film producer and director

Robyn Bliley is an American television and film producer and award-winning director.

== Career ==
In 2002, Robyn co-founded Progressive Productions with cinematographer Chad Wilson. Her critically acclaimed first documentary feature, "Circus Rosaire" won numerous festival awards. She was Creator & Executive Producer of pilots for Discovery / Animal Planet and 20th Century Fox Television. She has produced and directed numerous commercials, branded content, and web series for AOL, Walmart, Verizon, Lexus and others. Additionally, Robyn has directed hundreds of multi-camera live music programs with major recording artists such as Taylor Swift, Green Day, Gwen Stefani, Coldplay and Stevie Wonder.

Robyn started her career as an actress in Hollywood, with lead and guest-starring roles in more than two dozen television shows and movies.

== Filmography ==
- Ultraman: The Ultimate Hero - Julie Young
