= Two-body problem (career) =

Dilemma for life partners in academia

The two-body problem is a dilemma for life partners (e.g. spouses or any other couple) often referred to in academia, relating to the difficulty of both spouses obtaining jobs at the same university, narrow specialism, or within a reasonable commuting distance from each other.

The inability of one partner to accommodate the other produces this central dilemma, which is a no-win situation in which if the couple wishes to stay together one of them may be forced to abandon an academic career, or if both wish to pursue academic careers the relationship may falter due to the spouses being constantly separated. The term two-body problem has been used in the context of working couples since at least the mid-1990s. It alludes to the two-body problem in classical mechanics.

More than 70 percent of academic faculty in the United States are in a relationship where both partners work, and more than a third of faculty have a partner who also works in academia.

Traditionally, this problem was solved by wives who supported their husbands' careers by interrupting their own, often combined with an academic advancement system that actively discriminated against women and especially married women. Some past overt sexism has been ameliorated, and many universities have instituted spousal hiring programs or other creative approaches to the problem. Nevertheless, gendered pressure to compromise persists and causes a disproportionate number of women to leave the academic workforce.

== See also ==
- Academic mobility
- Dual-career commuter couples
- Opportunity trap
- Shared earning/shared parenting marriage
