= Melissa Michaelsen =

American actress

Melissa Michaelsen is an American actress best known for her roles in the 1979 television film Orphan Train and as the title character in the sitcom Me and Maxx.

== Family ==
Michaelsen's father, Alwin Michaelsen, is a financial consultant who graduated from Princeton in 1954.

Gail was the one who initially took the children around to auditions. Michaelsen's four siblings all acted as children, most notably Peter Billingsley and, to a lesser extent, Neil, who began playing Danny Walton on the daytime soap opera Search for Tomorrow in 1975.

== Career ==
She appeared in many television commercials and guest starred in many television shows including Code Red, Here's Boomer, The Young Riders, and Seven Brides for Seven Brothers.

Michaelsen starred in several made-for-TV movies such as Orphan Train, Broken Promise, and Goldie and the Boxer films.

Michaelsen's played the title role, Maxx Davis, on the sitcom Me and Maxx in 1980. She was picked for the role when a commercial starring Joe Santos aired during one of Michaelsen's early projects. NBC president Fred Silverman saw the commercial while watching Michaelsen's TV-movie and reportedly said "I want that guy with that girl." This was Michaelsen's second attempt at a network series. In an interview about Goldie and the Boxer, her co-star and producer, O. J. Simpson, mentioned that he first saw Michaelsen in an unaired ABC pilot a few days before the film was to begin shooting.

Michaelsen received favorable reviews from both critics and her costars. The New York Times singled her out in their review of Memories Never Die in which she co-starred opposite Lindsay Wagner: "The entire supporting cast is uncommonly good, but special notice might be taken of young Miss Michaelsen. Her pouting, sulking, resentful Kathy is in startling contrast to the sunny Shirley Temple type she has played in such television movies as Goldie and the Boxer. Like Miss Wagner, she, too, is proceeding nicely with her career." Television writer Jerry Buck quoted Michaelsen's co-star Joe Santos as saying that "She's a terrific actress and a wonderful human being", as he went on to praise her work ethic.

Michaelsen made two more attempts at series television. In 1981, she filmed a pilot for CBS. The show was an attempt to bring the film Little Darlings to television. It never aired. In 1984, Michaelsen made another pilot with a role as Stella Stevens' youngest daughter in the western No Man's Land. The two other sisters were played by Terri Garber and Donna Dixon. The show was not picked up, but the pilot was broadcast as a two-hour TV-movie. Aside from acting, she has done public speaking during her youth; in 1983 she was one of the keynote speakers at a conference on Indian unity.

== Later life ==
Following her acting career, Michaelsen spent some time as a representative for New York's Morgans Hotel Group.
