= No Man's Land (1984 film) =

1984 film

- Written by: Juanita Bartlett
- Directed by: Rod Holcomb
- Starring: Marc Alaimo; Donna Dixon; Terri Garber; Jack Garner; Estelle Getty; Sam J. Jones; Janis Paige; Stella Stevens
- Music by: Pete Carpenter; Mike Post
- Country of origin: United States
- Original language: English

Production
- Executive producer: Juanita Bartlett
- Producers: Rod Holcomb; Christopher Nelson
- Cinematography: Ted Voigtlander
- Editor: Seymour Masters
- Running time: 104 minutes
- Production company: Jadda Productions

Original release
- Network: NBC
- Release: May 24, 1984

No Man's Land is a 1984 American made-for-television Western film. The film featured Marc Alaimo, Donna Dixon, Terri Garber, Jack Garner, Estelle Getty, Sam J. Jones, Janis Paige, and Stella Stevens. It was directed by Rod Holcomb and written by Juanita Bartlett.

== Plot ==
The sheriff of a western town has three daughters by different men. Each has inherited: skills...magic, gambling & tomboy/cowboy. Together they help their mother catch a band of outlaws.

== Cast ==
- Marc Alaimo as Clay Allison
- Wil Albert as Wilmot
- Frank Bonner as Deputy Thad Prouty
- Donna Dixon as Sarah Wilder
- Terri Garber as Brianne Wilder
- Jack Garner as Simon Claypool
- Estelle Getty as Eurol Muller
- Sam J. Jones as Eli Howe
- Bryan Michael McGuire as Dandy Wallace
- Ralph Michael as Doc Havilland
- Melissa Michaelsen as Missy Wilder
- Janis Paige as Maggie Hodiak
- John Quade as Henry Lambert
- Eldon Quick as Everett Vanders
- Dack Rambo as Connell
- John Rhys-Davies as Grimshaw
- D. Hampton Rice as Pecos Rankin
- Jeremy Ross as Pratt
- Stella Stevens as Nellie Wilder
- Billy Streater as Holden
- Tony Swartz as Monroe
- Buck Taylor as Feeny
- Robert Webber as Will Blackfield
- Roz Witt as Harriet Claypool
