= Me and Maxx =

- Joe Santos as Norman Davis and Melissa Michaelsen as Maxx Davis
- Genre: Comedy
- Created by: James Komack
- Written by: Neil Rosen; George Tricker; Stan Cutler; James Komack
- Directed by: Herbert Kenwith (1 episode)
- Starring: Melissa Michaelsen; Joe Santos; Jenny Sullivan; Jim Weston; Denny Evans
- Theme music composer: Michael Lloyd; James Komack
- Opening theme: "Is It Because of Love" by Leonore O'Malley
- Composer: Michael Lloyd
- Country of origin: United States
- Original language: English
- No. of seasons: 1
- No. of episodes: 10

Production
- Executive producer: James Komack
- Producers: Don Van Atta; George Tricker; Neil Rosen; Stan Cutler
- Running time: 30 minutes
- Production companies: James Komack Company, Inc.

Original release
- Network: NBC
- Release: March 22 – July 25, 1980

Me and Maxx is an American television sitcom that aired on NBC from March 22 to July 25, 1980. The plot involved a young girl, Maxx (Melissa Michaelsen), moving in with her father, Norman (Joe Santos), who had created a life for himself as a swinging bachelor.

== Cast ==
- Joe Santos as Norman Davis
- Melissa Michaelsen as Maxx Davis
- Jenny Sullivan as Barbara
- Denny Evans as Gary
- Jim Weston as Mitch

== Casting ==
Michaelsen and Santos were picked for the roles when a commercial starring Santos aired during one of Michaelsen's early projects. NBC president Fred Silverman saw the commercial while watching Michaelsen's TV-movie and reportedly said "I want that guy with that girl." Another source gives credit for the role to the daughter of the producer, James Komack. Maxine (nicknamed "Maxx") Komack, whom the main character was named after, walked in on the screen tests and saw Michaelsen playing the role. She supposedly blurted out, "That's her. The little blonde girl. That's Maxx!"

== Episodes ==
No.	Title	Directed by	Written by	Original release date
1	"Pilot"	Herbert Kenwith	James Komack	March 22, 1980
Maxx's mother abandons her at the door of her swinging divorced father.
2	"Lunch at the Plaza"	Unknown	George Tricker & Neil Rosen	March 29, 1980
Filled with high hopes of meeting her mother at the Plaza Hotel for her birthday lunch, Maxx ventures to the posh New York hotel, but it's her father who shows up to cheer the waiting 11-year-old.
3	"Maxx's Friend"	Unknown	George Tricker & Neil Rosen	April 5, 1980
Norman plans for a romantic dinner date with a beautiful neighbor are cut short when he begins worrying about Maxx and a male sleep-over guest. Guest star: Ronnie Scribner.
4	"Sparrow"	Unknown	George Tricker & Neil Rosen	April 16, 1980
When an injured sparrow that Maxx has been nursing dies in his care, Norman wonders what to tell his daughter.
5	"Robert"	Unknown	Andy Guerdat & Steve Kreinberg	May 30, 1980
All wrapped up in his work, Norman is angry when he learns that Maxx's constant companion, Robert, is an imaginary "perfect" father and substitute for him.
6	"The Negotiation"	Unknown	George Tricker & Neil Rosen	June 6, 1980
Maxx holds off on household chores until her father agrees to settle her strike for the same necessities of life that her friend Karen has - a stereo, bicycle, and telephone. Guest star: Mindy Cohn as Karen.
7	"4"	Unknown	Mike Marmer	June 13, 1980
Maxx catches her father reading her diary.
8	"The Commitment"	Unknown	Stan Cutler	June 20, 1980
Norman wants his partnership with Barbara (Jenny Sullivan) to go beyond business, but she won't agree to rekindle their romance until he pledges fidelity.
9	"Dad's Day"	Unknown	Terry Hart	June 27, 1980
When Norman learns of the death of his father, whom he hadn't seen for years, he forgoes a baseball game to attend Dad's Day at Maxx's school.
10	"Some Are Savers"	Unknown	Stan Cutler	July 25, 1980
When Norman absent-mindedly throws out a drawing Maxx gave him, she counters by tossing out some of the things he gave her.
