= Long-distance relationship =

Relations between persons on different geographical locations

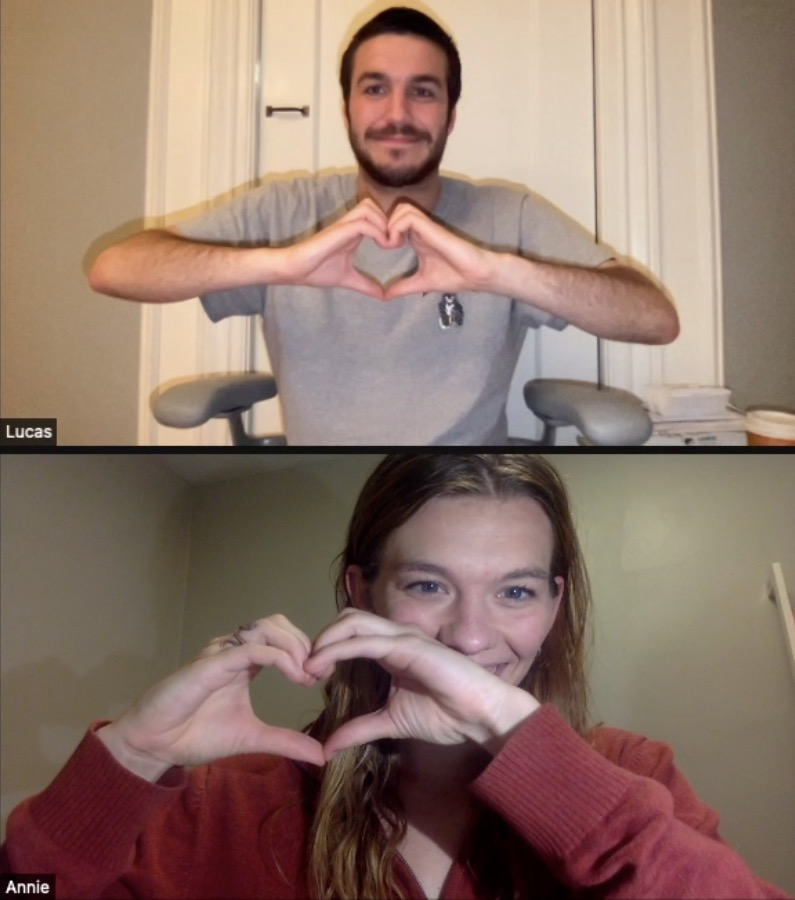
Partners in LDRs typically use frequent telecommunications (such as videotelephony in the image above) to maintain their relationship

A long-distance relationship (LDR) or long-distance romantic relationship is an intimate relationship between partners who are geographically separated from one another. Partners in LDRs face geographic separation and lack of face-to-face contact. LDRs are particularly prevalent among college students, constituting 25% to 50% of all relationships. Even though scholars have reported a significant number of LDRs in undergraduate populations, long-distance relationships continue to be an understudied phenomenon.

== Characteristics ==
LDRs are qualitatively different from geographically close relationships; that is, relationships in which the partners are able to see each other, face-to-face, most days. According to Rohlfing (1995) he suggests the following unique challenges for those in long-distance relationships:

- Increased financial burdens to maintain relationships
- Difficulty maintaining geographically close friendships while in long-distance romantic relationships
- Difficulty judging the state of a relationship from a distance
- High expectations by partners for the quality of limited face-to-face meetings in the relationship

== LDRs with friends and family ==
Not all long-distance relationships are romantic. When individuals go away to school, their relationships with family and friends also become long-distance. Pew Internet (2004) asserts that 79% of adult respondents from the United States reported using the Internet for communication with family and friends. Also, Pew Internet (2002a) states that because of new technologies, college students will have greater social ties with their friends than their family members. Therefore, examining email among college students helps explore how the Internet is affecting college students emotionally and socially.

Under the great influence of globalization, together with the advancement in transportation and communication technologies, migration has gradually become a feature of contemporary society. As a result, transnational families have become increasingly common in which family members live in different regions and countries, yet hold a sense of collective unity across national borders. For instance, children choose to leave home to study abroad, parents decide to leave home for better prospects and salaries, or siblings pursue different life paths around the world.

=== Sustaining family relationships ===
A qualitative study that conducted 50 interviews with adult migrant children in Australia and their parents in Italy, Ireland, and the Netherlands found that geographically separated family members generally exchanged all types of care and support that proximate families did, including financial, practical, personal, accommodation, and emotional or moral support. According to Loretta Baldassar, a closely related ethnographic analysis of 30 transnational families between grown-up migrant children living in Australia and their parents in Italy from the 1950s to 2000s illustrated that the exchange of emotional and moral support between parents and children was the fundamental factor for sustaining and staying committed to family relationships in transnational families. The prevalence of Internet technologies has facilitated remote family members' emotional exchange, and provided them with the opportunity of accessible and affordable long-distance communication on a daily basis for sustaining relationships.

Cao (2013) conducted a series of interviews with 14 individuals who constantly communicated with family members living in different time zones, namely the UK, US, Canada, and China. Analysis revealed that among a variety of communication methods, including synchronous means such as telephone and Internet audio/video call (e.g., Skype) and asynchronous methods such as email or text messaging, remote family members relied heavily on synchronous methods for virtual contact. The real-time interactivity from synchronous communication provides a sense of presence, connectedness, and dedication between family members, which is regarded by Cao as an essential component of emotional support. However, it is worth noting that the Internet technologies have not replaced the use of older, less useful forms of communication, in which transnational families still use letters, cards, gifts, and photographs, etc. for showing their care and love.

Research has shown that people sustain close relationships using different communication patterns with different family members. While people usually communicate heavily with immediate family members such as parents or children, they tend to communicate less frequently and regularly with other family members including siblings across time zones. It is suggested that siblings feel less obligated to communicate dedicatedly with each other, especially for the younger generation, and they prefer ad hoc communication such as through instant messages to update each other's status.

=== The effects of geographical separation on children's well-being ===
Globally, there is a considerable number of parents who travel to another country in search of work, leaving behind their children in their home country. These parents hope to provide their children with better future life chances. The impacts of parents' migration for work on left-behind children's growth are mixed, depending on various factors and the outcomes of transnational living arrangements on children's well-being vary. For instance, through surveying a sample of 755 Mexican households with at least one family member who had migrated to the US, researchers reported that left-behind children might benefit economically from the remittances their parents sent home while suffering emotionally from long-term separation. Similar results were found by Lahaie, Hayes, Piper, and Heymann (2009), a correlational study investigating the relationship between parental migration and children's mental health outcomes using a representative sample of transnational families in Mexico and the US.

In addition, whether the mother or father migrates for work also plays a role. Based on the interviews and observations with Filipina transnational families, children tended to experience more emotional problems from transnational motherhood than fatherhood, taking the traditional family gender roles into account. The impacts of parent migration on children's psychological well-being are also distinctive in different countries. With reference to the data collected from the cross-sectional baseline study of Children Health and Migrant Parents in Southeast Asia (CHMPSEA), Graham and Jordan (2011) showed that children of migrant fathers in Indonesia and Thailand were more likely to suffer from poor psychological health when compared to children in non-migrant families, while the findings did not replicate in children from Philippine and Vietnam.

Special care arrangement for left-behind children, such as asking the extended family members for help to take on caregiving tasks, affects children's growth substantially. Lahaie et al. (2009) revealed that children who took care of themselves had a higher probability to exhibit behavioral and academic problems when compared to other children with care arrangements. The feeling of being abandoned by parents is proposed to be one of the reasons that the children commit to undesirable behaviors such as quitting school or gang involvement as retaliation.

== Military long-distance relationship ==
The partners of military personnel deployed abroad experience a significant amount of stress, before and during the deployment. The difference between a military LDR and a regular LDR lies within the restricted access to regular communication. Phone calls may be controlled by military regulations, or there may not be much time to talk. Because of the communication restrictions and the overall process of deployment, this may leave the partner back home feeling lonely, and stressing on how to keep a strong relationship moving forward. Other stressors that add to the emotional situation are the realization that the service member is being deployed to a combat zone where their life is threatened. Through all the stages of the deployment the partner may exhibit emotional problems, such as anxiety, loss, denial, anger, depression, and acceptance.

== Statistics in the US ==
In 2005 a survey suggested that in the United States, 14 to 15 million people considered themselves to be in a long-distance relationship. By 2015, this number remained at about 14 million. About 32.5% of college relationships are long-distance. The average amount of distance in a long-distance relationship is 125 miles. Couples in a long-distance relationship call each other every 2.7 days. On average, couples in long-distance relationships will visit each other 1.5 times a month. Also couples in long-distance relationships expect to live together around 14 months into the relationship. About 40% of couples in long-distance relationships break up; around 4.5 months into the relationship is the time when couples most commonly start having problems. 70% of couples in a long-distance relationship break up due to unplanned circumstances and events. 75% of all engaged couples have, at some point, been in a long-distance relationship, and around 10% of couples continue to maintain a long-distance relationship after marriage. About 3.75 million married couples are in a long-distance relationship in the US alone.

== Means of staying in contact ==
New communication technologies such as cellular phone plans make communication among individuals at a distance easier than in the past. Before the popularity of internet dating, long-distance relationships were not as common, as the primary forms of communication between the romance lovers usually involved either telephone conversations or corresponding via mail. According to Pew Internet in 2008, American citizens were asked how often they used the Internet on a typical day, they reported 56% sending or reading email, 10% reported sending instant messages, and 9% reported using an online social network such as Facebook or Twitter. However, with the advent of the Internet, long-distance relationships have exploded in popularity as they become less challenging to sustain with the use of modern technology. Ultimately, communicating and setting realistic goals can help prevent disconnection and the loss of touch.

The increase in long-distance relationships is matched by an increasing number of technologies designed specifically to support intimate couples living apart. In particular there have been a host of devices which have attempted to mimic co-located behaviors at a distance including hugging, kissing, and even sex. One example is app-connected intimacy devices like Lovense, which allow partners to interact in real time across physical distance. The success of these technologies has, so far, been limited.

Couples who have routine, strategic relational maintenance behaviors, and take advantage of social media can help maintain a long-distance relationship. Having positivity (making interactions cheerful and pleasant), openness (directly discussing the relationship and one's feelings), assurances (reassuring the partner about the relationship and the future), network (relying on support and love of others), shared tasks (performing common tasks) and conflict management (giving the partner advice) are some of the routine and strategic relation maintenance behaviors.

== Relationship maintenance behaviors ==
Intimate relationship partners constantly work to improve their relationship. There are many ways in which they can make their partner happy and strengthen the overall relationship. The ways in which individuals behave have a major effect on the satisfaction and the durability of the relationship. Researchers have found systems of maintenance behaviors between intimate partners. Maintenance behaviors can be separated into seven categories: assurances in relation to love and commitment in the relationship, openness in sharing their feelings, conflict management, positive interactions, sharing tasks, giving advice to their partner, and using social networks for support (Dainton, 2000; Stafford, Dainton, & Haas, 2000).

Dindia and Emmers-Sommer (2006) identified three categories of maintaining behaviors that are used by partners to deal with separation. "Prospective behaviors, such as telling the partner goodbye, which addresses anticipated separation; introspective behaviors, which is communication when the partners are apart; and retrospective behaviors which are basically talking to each other face to face, which reaffirms connection after separation." (Dindia, & Emmers-Sommer, 2006). These are known as the relationship continuity constructional units (RCCUs). Maintenance behaviors as well as the RCCUs are correlated with an increase in relationship satisfaction, as well as, commitment (Pistole et al., 2010).

== Research ==
In a study of jealousy experience, expression, in LDRs, 114 individuals who were in LDRs indicated how much face-to-face contact they had in a typical week. Thirty-three percent of participants reported no face-to-face contact, whereas 67% reported periodic face-to-face contact with a mean of one to two days. The researchers compared LDRs to GCRs (geographically close relationships) and discovered that those in LDRs with no face-to-face contact experience more jealousy than those with periodic face-to-face contact or those in GCRs. Furthermore, those without periodic face-to-face contact were more likely to use the internet to communicate with their partner. They found that the presence of periodic face-to-face contact is a crucial factor in the satisfaction, commitment, and trust of LDR partners. Those who do not experience periodic face-to-face contact reported significantly lower levels of satisfaction, commitment, and trust.

Another study generated a sample of 180 undergraduate students who were in LDRs and became geographically close. Of the reunited couples, 66 individuals terminated their relationships after moving to the same location, whereas 114 continued their relationship.

A study done by Stafford, Merolla, and Castle (2006) reported that the transition from being separated geographically to proximal increased partner interference. Based on the Communicative Interdependence Perspective, it was found that when partners switched from technologically mediated communication (TMC) to face-to-face (FtF) or vice versa, they experienced certain levels of discomfort. The transition from FtF to TMC communication can make it difficult to express one's emotions and can be easier to cause miscommunication. It is believed to be plausible that transitions can be a risk factor towards long-distance dating relationships.

Based on the analysis of the open-ended responses, 97% of respondents noted some type of relationship change associated with the LD-GC (geographically close) transition. When the respondents were asked about having the ability to have more face-to-face time when GC and the enjoyment of increased time spent together most comments were positive. For example, "We finally got to do all the 'little' things we'd been wanting to do for so long; we get to hold each other, wake up next to each other, eat together, etc." Many Individuals reported a loss of autonomy, following reunion. For example, many individuals liked and missed the "freedom" or "privacy" the distance allowed. Reports of "nagging", demanding or expecting "too much" were also frequent responses. Several individuals reported more conflict and "fighting" in their relationship after it became geographically close. Many said they felt the conflict in their relationship was not only more frequent but also more difficult to resolve. For example, one individual stated that, when his/her relationship was long-distance, they "fought less and if we did fight, problems were solved in a shorter amount of time." For some individuals living in the same location led to increased feelings of jealousy. After witnessing their partner's behavior, some participants said that they became increasingly concerned that their partners were currently "cheating" on them or had "cheated on them in the past." Reunion allowed the discovery of positive as well as negative characteristics about their partner, feeling that the partner had changed in some way since the relationship was long-distance.

== See also ==
- Living apart together
- Dual-career commuter couples
