= Dual-career commuter couples =

Intimitate partners who live apart while both pursuing careers

Commuter couples are a subset of dual-career couples who live apart in separate residences while both partners pursue careers.

Gilbert and Rachlin address the difference between dual-earner families and dual-career families, distinguishing that dual-earner couples are those in which both spouses are earning for the family, but one or both of them consider their occupational involvement as a job. Jobs are unlike careers in that they do not require extensive training or commitment. In dual-earner couples, one spouse's work is generally considered secondary. Dual-career couples are families in which "both heads of household pursue careers and at the same time maintain a family life together". Both have high degrees of commitment to their careers, and neither partner's career is thought to be more important than that of the other.

== Historical background ==
=== Statistics ===
In the United States, statistics from as early as 1989 report that 53% of married households were dual-earner couples. By 1996, the percent of dual-earner couples grew to 61%. According to data from 1989, approximately 7 million employees (15% to 20% of all dual-earner marriages) were classified as dual-career couples. By 2003, U.S. workers take more than 400 million long-distance business trips (i.e., trips over 50 miles) each year. Commuter marriages are on the rise, with recent estimates indicating that as many as 3 million Americans reside in different locations from their spouses. Research on this phenomenon has generally focused on heterosexual couples.

=== Formation of commuter couples ===
The increase in women's career opportunities also increases the problems of couples pursuing two careers in the same place, and can cause conflict regarding which spouse's career should take precedence. One major concern for dual-career couples is finding employment in the same geographic location. One partner usually compromises by taking a less desirable job so that the other can take a position that might further his or her career. However, if this compromise cannot be reached, the option of commuting can be the result, where both spouses enjoy highly desirable jobs at the sacrifice of maintaining separate residences.

In the definition of dual-career commuter couples, the work pursued by each member of the couple requires 1) a high degree of commitment and special training with increasing degrees of responsibility (this includes students pursuing an advanced educational degree) and 2) that the couple maintain homes in separate geographic locations. Traveling sales or business workers, military personnel, migrant workers, and construction and trade workers who leave home for various lengths of time are not included in the definition. When couples share a home and one or both members commute long distances to work each day or couples immigrating at separate times, they are also not included in this definition.

The dyad of commuter couples is typically composed of the "commuter", who moves to a secondary residence for work, and the "noncommuter", who stays at the primary residence. Other terms for the lifestyle are married-singles, commuter marriages, commuter families, commuter lifestyle, and commuter relationships.

=== Characteristics ===
Research reveals that most commuter couples have a high level of education and that both partners have professional or executive careers. Most are between the ages of 25 and 65, the mean age being mid- to late thirties. Forty to 50% of commuter couples have children, and more than 50% have been married for more than 9 years. Most of commuter couples are with advanced degrees and are heavily involved in their careers. The most attractive factor of a job for commuter couples is the job-education match. Lindemann has found that factors making dual-career commuter relationships more likely include financial security, self-reliance, a lack of children, and adaptability.

=== Advantages ===
Advantages of the commuting lifestyle are identified as 1) increased career opportunities, 2) professional autonomy, 3) increased independence, 4) increased appreciation of time together, 5) decreased focus on disagreements, and 6) decreased frequency of arguments.

=== Disadvantages ===
Disadvantages of being commuting couples are 1) financial problems; 2) loneliness; 3) lack of personal and professional support system due to a lack of time to build and maintain these relationships; 4) negative attitudes from friends, family, coworkers, and society; 5) increased tension in marriage and the family; 6) decreased satisfaction with sex life; 7) missed important family moments and day-to-day experiences; and 8) lack of social life, hobbies, and individual projects.

== Contributing factors ==
=== Role conflict ===
There has been inconsistent evidence in relation to role conflict in dual-career commuter couples. Role conflict, according to Biddle, is “the concurrent appearance of two or more incompatible expectations for the behavior of a person”, and when a person experiences role conflict, it can have negative effects on multiple aspects of their lives, including decreased job performance and decreased commitment to an organization. In contrast to that definition, findings have shown that many commuters find their lifestyle beneficial in that it allows them to pursue their careers without having to deal with daily family distractions, and also gives them a sense of autonomy. This ability to compartmentalize the roles the individual plays may lead to more work life satisfaction, supported by findings that commuter couples generally had more work life satisfaction than dual-career couples in a single residence. However, there are still challenges faced by commuter couples in their different roles. It would seem that such great compartmentalization can lead some individuals to struggle with balancing both their work and family roles and the responsibilities for each; almost half of commuter couples studied by Anderson reported that they rarely felt that they had a good balance between job and family. Also, families who are commuters are thought to become more competent in their performance of all family-related tasks, suggesting that there is a less traditional division of labor between women and men. However, Anderson and Spruill found that even in commuter couples, most traditional household tasks were still performed by women, while tasks such as household maintenance and lawn-mowing were performed by men. These findings suggest that commuter couples may still be relatively traditional in their role divisions from a gender perspective.

=== Social comparison ===
According to Festinger (1954) and Social Comparison Theory, when there is no “objective” assessment for one's abilities or opinions, one will compare themselves to others who are seen to be similar. It is also said that when others have a difference in abilities or opinions, one who is comparing themselves will almost always move their idea of what abilities or opinions are appropriate closer to the comparison others’. In line with this theory, it makes sense that commuter couples would try to compare themselves to other married couples, but it will often pose problems for them because their relationships do differ in many ways. When commuter couples compare themselves to “traditional marriages”, it can cause them a lot of discomfort. This is also true for society's expectations of a commuter couple; if society compares them to “traditional couples”, they refrain from addressing important aspects of the relationship, and consequently lack a solid understanding. It was found that partners who felt that their peers thought that the commuting lifestyle was the beginning of a divorce experienced more stress.

=== Adjusting versus established couples ===
"Adjusting" couples are generally younger with few or no children, and they experience the separation earlier in their relationship. It seems that younger women generally struggle more with the guilt that their male partners are disadvantaged in some way, and young men tend to feel a sense of loss in comparison to a traditional male partner. These couples often experience more stress over the conflict of whose career is “more important” than the stress of being apart.

"Established" couples are generally older, have been married longer, and have children. With these couples, much of the stress comes from childcare. Generally, in heterosexual marriages, husbands will feel some resentment in the increase in responsibilities for the children, while the wives feel guilty about their lessened involvement in their children's lives.

== Becoming a commuter couple ==
=== Attachment theory and perceived relationship quality ===
==== Attachment theory ====
In important romantic relationships, attachment refers to strong emotional bonding and the feeling of being secure. To maintain the security feelings, individuals stay in a comfortable range of proximity to their partner. Under certain circumstances, even separation due to planned travel evokes concerns of the partner's inaccessibility. This inaccessibility may be associated with anxiety, loneliness, and yearning for the partner. Through psychological (e.g., internal representation), symbolic (e.g., pictures), or physical proximity gaining accessibility, individuals calm down and restore security.

Three different attachment styles are identified by attachment researchers: secure, avoidant, and anxiety attached. Those who are securely attached have positive views of the self and their partner, and are confident when seeking proximity to the partner. Avoidant individuals, with two subtypes, generally suppress desires of seeking for partners. Specifically, dismissing-avoidant individuals have a positive self-worth, but have a negative view of the partner, and prefer low emotional involvement. Fearful-avoidants have negative views of both the self and the partner and fear rejection. In contrast, individuals with anxiety attachment styles are hyperactive, continuously seeking and attempting to maintain partner proximity. Those who have anxious attachment styles have negative self-views, and the partner is considered essential to self-worth but insufficiently accessible. The Relationship Questionnaire by Bartholomew and Horowitz (1991) and Experience in Close Relationship Scale by Brennan, Clark, and Shaver (1998) are two commonly used measurements for attachment style. The Relationship Questionnaire assess attachment style by crossing the positive or negative view of self and partner. This questionnaire provides the categorical data, that means to categorize participants into four attachment styles without any scores. The Experience in Close Relationship Scale on the other hand, measures on a seven-point scale. People with lower scores are toward the attachment avoidance end, and people with higher scores are more likely to be attachment anxious style. This scale provides quantitative information about attachment style. Though the two scales can be used separately, they make up the categorical and interval part for each other. Thus, it is recommended to use both of them. The combination of both scales have been proven valid in measuring attachment styles.

==== Perceived long-distance relationship quality ====
Secure attachment is related to positive relationship qualities (e.g., satisfaction; commitment). Although it may seem counter-intuitive, long-distance relationships between securely attached individuals are perceived to be similar in relationship quality to relationships of securely attached individuals who are geographically close. Avoidant and anxious attachment style individuals who are involved in long-distance relationships perceive their relationship as lower quality than avoidant and anxious individuals in geographically close relationships. Commuter couples’ relationship quality are expected to differ based on the individuals’ attachment styles. Recently, research found that commuter couples who meet on a monthly base (i.e., meet more than once a month) relationship quality was influenced by the separation.

==== Decision-making processes ====
Some studies report that many couples do not go through an evaluation of the commuting lifestyle before they engage in it. Although the dual-career commuter couples are generally a highly educated and sophisticated group of people, the majority of the couples studied did not use a systematic decision-making process. The commuter couples did not collect information, talk to other commuting couples, or review other alternatives in making their decision to commute. Instead, the couples simply accepted that commuting was necessary and then discussed what the details of the impending separation would entail. In addition, two thirds of the couples made no plans to reevaluate the effectiveness of their decision to commute. Despite these findings, there are couples who do go through a decision-making process. They are reported to have higher relationship satisfaction than those who did not go through a systematic decision-making process.

== Practical implications ==
For the individual, there are a few suggestions to be made in regard to becoming a dual-career couple based on implications of past research. First, the division of labor should be discussed and made clear to both spouses, so it each individual's expectations are apparent. The stability of the relationship should also be considered, as well as the possible reactions each individual might have in response to societal views. The expenses of traveling and each spouse's history of being alone (i.e., their attachment styles) should be considered as well. Finally, couples should consider discussing the decision with other commuter couples to gain first-hand knowledge. Organization, frequent communication, and rituals have been found to be three of the most important aspects of successfully maintaining a commuting lifestyle.

Weekly organized meetings can provide an opportunity for the couple to practice communication, improve organization, take care of household responsibilities, and keep in touch about past and future events. Developing a set of rituals and schedules can help commuter couples ease the stress of departing and reuniting with each other. Rituals such as daily phone calls, sharing dinner while talking on the phone, regular dependable visitation times, a predictable routine for reuniting and departing, special dinner dates for their first nights together, and leaving intimate messages and signs of affection have been found to be helpful for many commuter couples. These rituals help the couple establish a shared history that they can draw on during lonely moments.

== See also ==
- Attachment theory
- Social comparison theory
- Work-life balance
- Long-distance relationship
- Shared earning/shared parenting marriage
