= Angelo Loukakis =

Australian author

- Born: 1951 (age 74–75); Sydney, New South Wales
- Occupations: Novelist and short story writer
- Writing career
- Language: English
- Years active: 1976-
- Notable work: For the Patriarch

Angelo Loukakis (1951-) is an Australian author. He was born in Sydney, Australia, attended Fort Street High School, studied English literature at the University of New South Wales, and acquired a Dip. Ed. from Sydney Teachers College and a doctorate in creative arts from the University of Technology, Sydney. He has worked as a teacher, editor, publisher and scriptwriter.

== Writing career ==
Loukakis is the author of three novels; two collections of short stories, as well as non-fiction work, such as a children's book on Greeks in Australia, a book on ancestry based on the Australian version of the television series Who Do You Think You Are? and a travel book on Norfolk Island.

Loukakis’s parents came from the island of Crete, Greece and his novel, The Memory of Tides, which has as a backdrop the Battle of Crete, honours their generation. Of that novel he has said:

I wanted to show the extraordinary and positive relationships that were formed between Greeks and Aussies at a time of profound crisis. There were many instances of cross-cultural revelation during the Greek campaign. For humble, frightened village people an awakening and relief—they could scarcely believe that complete strangers would come from across the world to try to protect them from the Nazi tyrants. For Aussie boys, an awareness of a culture that had given birth to the very things they were fighting for—freedom and democracy.

His collection of short stories For the Patriarch received an award at the 1981 NSW Premier's Awards and was set on the NSW HSC syllabus between 1986 and 2001. He was the script writer for the 1980 film Dancing, directed by George Whaley and produced by David Elfick, which was shown at the Melbourne International Film Festival. He was writer of the SBS television series drama The Girl from Steel City, screened 1987-88 The Girl from Steel City.

Angelo Loukakis was a member of the Literature Board of the Australia Council (1985–87), founding Chair of the NSW Writers' Centre (1991), and Executive Director of the Australian Society of Authors (2010–16).

== Bibliography ==
=== Novels ===
- Messenger (1992)
- The Memory of Tides (2006)
- Houdini's Flight (2010)

=== Short story collections ===
- For the Patriarch (1981)
- Vernacular Dreams (1986)

=== Children's ===
- The Greeks (1981) (non-fiction)
