= The Girl from Steel City =

- Starring: Elli Hart
- Country of origin: Australia
- No. of seasons: 2
- No. of episodes: 23

Production
- Running time: 30 mins

Original release
- Network: SBS
- Release: March 20, 1986 – 1988

The Girl from Steel City is an Australian television series which first screened on SBS in 1986.The series was the first continuing drama series created by SBS.

== Synopsis ==
The Girl From Steel City told the story of Stacey Maniatis, a Greek-Australian girl living in Wollongong, who was determined to have a career as a singer. The second series saw Stacey move from Wollongong to Sydney to further her career as a singer but then became an investigative journalist.

== Production ==
The series was mostly in English but contained some Greek dialogue with English subtitles. It was written by Angelo Loukakis, directed by Peter Andrikidis and produced by John Martin and Colin Baker. Music was produced by Tony Karras. The first season consisted of 15 episodes and the second season consisted of 8 episodes.

== Reception ==
Lisa Wallace of the Canberra Times called it "a breath of fresh air in television drama series, and again strengthens the argument for local product before soppy American and British pap."

== Cast ==
- Elli Hart as Stacey
- Jim Spyridopoulos as Vag
- Michael Garifalakis as Yannis
- Nancy Caruana as Katerina
- Stan Kouros as Con
- Grace Parr as Helen
- Eric Oldfield
- Raina Mckeon
- Sheree Da Costa
- Thalia Caruana

== See also ==
- List of Australian television series
