= A Match Made in Heaven =

- Cast of A Match Made in Heaven
- Written by: Susan Rice
- Directed by: Paul Wendkos
- Starring: Olympia Dukakis; John Stamos; Kelly Rowan; Della Reese; Estelle Getty
- Music by: Don Davis
- Country of origin: United States
- Original language: English

Production
- Cinematography: Chuck Arnold
- Running time: 120 minutes

Original release
- Network: CBS
- Release: April 27, 1997

A Match Made in Heaven is a 1997 television film inspired by actual events. It is about a dying widow who plays matchmaker to her 32-year-old unmarried son and sets him up with a nurse that she meets. The film stars Olympia Dukakis, John Stamos and Kelly Rowan.

== Plot ==
Tom Rosner is a successful divorce lawyer, whose elderly mother Helen obsesses over his unmarried status. Helen, in remission from cancer, visits the hospital for a check-up and encounters her doctor's new nurse Jane Cronin, a single woman who is hesitant to meet someone new after getting out of a five-year relationship. Helen is struck by Jane's beauty, compassion, intelligence and sense of humor, and decides she is the one for her son to the chagrin of her longtime caretaker Katie Beale.

Tom and Jane humor Helen by going on a date, but they describe the experience to Helen in vastly different ways. Tom is convinced Jane liked him while Jane described the date as "the worst social experience since the dawn of man." Helen convinces Jane to go on a second date, which goes better, but Tom senses he isn't the kind of man Jane's looking for.

Helen uses jelousy to convince Tom to see Jane again and the relationship develops. When her cancer returns, Helen determines to get Tom to finally settle down. Katie tells her she is meddling too much in her son's life and that he's capable of forging his own path. Tom, upset by Helen's new diagnosis, goes out drinking and gets dragged onto a dance floor. The woman him to take her home, but he turns her down. Jane unexpectedly arrives. Also upset at the diagnosis, she had left concerned messages for him all day. The sight of Tom with the girl drives her to flee, driving Tom deeper into depression.

As Helen's condition worsens, she comes to understand she can't manage her son's life forever. Jane supports Helen as she nears the end, but refuses to talk to Tom about their relationship. At Helen's funeral, Tom tries again to talk to Jane, but she's whisked away. In a fit of depression he's knocked down crossing a street without looking first. Katie calls Jane, who hurries back to see him, then leaves when she's assured he's not hurt. Tom pursues her, apologizing and declaring his love.

At the wedding of Tom and Jane, Helen gleefully watches from afar.

== Cast ==
- Olympia Dukakis as Helen Rosner
- John Stamos as Thomas "Tom" Rosner
- Kelly Rowan as Jane Cronin
- Della Reese as Katie Beale
- Mitchell Whitfield as Gordon Rosner
- Stephanie Erb as Allyce Rosner
- Karen Ludwig as Priest
- Renée Taylor as Isobel Slotkin
- Liz Sheridan as Ruthie Klein
- Estelle Getty as Betty Weston
- Lance E. Nichols as Mort Paulson
- Gene Wolande as Husband
- Dale Raoul as Geraldine Burke
- Kevin Spirtas as Bruce
- William Bassett as Sam Landry

== Reception ==
The film has been described as an "(i)nspirational drama, inspired by actual events". The film holds a 78% approval rate on Rotten Tomatoes.
