= Ultraman: The Ultimate Hero =

- Also known as: Ultraman Powered
- Genre: Tokusatsu; Science fiction; Superhero; Kaiju
- Written by: Todd Gilbert; Tim Lennane; Walter A. Doty III; John Douglas; Stephen Karandy; Bud Robertson
- Directed by: King Wilder
- Starring: Kane Kosugi; Harrison Page; Robyn Bliley; Julie Young; Rob Roy Fitzgerald; Scott Rogers
- Composer: Toshihiko Sahashi
- Countries of origin: Japan; United States
- Original languages: Japanese; English
- No. of seasons: 1
- No. of episodes: 13

Production
- Executive producer: Noboru Tsuburaya
- Producers: King Wilder; Kazuo Tsuburaya; Shigeru Watanabe; Juliet Avola
- Cinematography: Don E. FauntLeRoy; Carlos González
- Editors: King Wilder; Vanick Moradian; Nina Gilberti
- Running time: 25 minutes
- Production company: Tsuburaya Productions

Original release
- Network: Syndication; VHS; Blu-Ray
- Release: December 16, 1993 – August 25, 1994

Related
- Ultraman: Towards the Future; Ultraman Tiga

Ultraman: The Ultimate Hero, also known as Ultraman Powered (ウルトラマンパワード, Urutoraman Pawādo), is a Japanese–American tokusatsu science fiction television series produced as a co-production between Major Havoc Entertainment (later renamed Steppin Stone Entertainment) and Tsuburaya Productions. It is the 11th entry to the Ultra Series and also the fourth and last foreign production in the franchise after Ultraman: Towards the Future, there wouldn’t be another International Production in the Ultra Series for 30 years until Ultraman: Rising. First released on Home Video in North America and later Japan on December 17, 1993, it later aired in Japan on TBS from April 8 to July 1, 1995, with a total of 13 episodes. The series was released on Blu-ray in Japan on March 24, 2017.

However, despite being produced in America, the show was never broadcast there. Although having impressive costume designs, the action was quite weak compared to other installments of the Ultra Series, due to the limited fighting space of the raised miniature sets and the fragile nature of the suits, often resulting in subdued fight scenes compared to other entries in the franchise. After this series, Tsuburaya has since focused on domestic productions.

== Premise ==
The members of WINR (pronounced "Winner") respond when members of the alien Baltan race attack Earth, but the Alien Baltans are only fended off when a gigantic alien, Ultraman Powered, joins with WINR member Kenichi Kai and gives him the power to metamorphose into Ultraman Powered in times of danger. At the end of the first episode Ultraman declares that the Alien Baltans were not completely defeated and that he will remain on Earth to continue the fight.

WINR and Ultraman Powered destroy numerous other monsters, but WINR learns that the Alien Baltans were arranging all the battles to learn Ultraman Powered's strengths and weaknesses. They also learn Kai's secret identity when Ultraman Powered is injured by Dorako and Kai sports an identical wound. In the finale the Psycho Baltan unleash their most powerful monster, Zetton. Ultraman Powered separates from Kai and takes on Zetton, but is overwhelmed. Ultraman Powered's color timer is flashing more and more rapidly as he tries to blast Zetton, only to have Zetton easily withstand the blasts. He then summons more energy despite the risk to fire a shot at Zetton's ship. This causes the shot to bounce off it towards Zetton's back, but he turns and blocks the shot. However this gives Ultraman Powered an opening and he summons the last of his energy for one final blast that hits Zetton in the back, destroying him. Ultraman Powered then falls over backwards as his energy is completely drained. Before he can perish completely, other members of the Ultra race, appearing as balls of light, arrive and convert Ultraman Powered into a red ball of light so that he can return home.

== Cast ==
- Harrison Page as Captain Russell Edlund
- Kane Kosugi as Kenichi Kai
- Rob Roy Fitzgerald as Rick Sanders
- Sandra Guibord as Theresa Beck
- Robyn Bliley as Julie Young
- Scott Rogers as Ultraman Powered

== Production ==
In the 1990s, the Australian-produced Ultraman: Towards the Future received positive reviews in Japan. The production committee model proved to be very effective in securing the production budget. Tsuburaya Productions initially planned to advance the second season of the series with the same character setup as Towards the Future, under the direction of Kiyoshi Suzuki. Juliet Avola and King Wilder who had previously served as producers on Puppet Master II were approached by Ken Iyadomi of Tsuburaya to lead the American side of production with Avola serving as producer while Wilder would serve as series director. Unlike other television series where each show is handled individually, Avola and Wilder shot all 13 episodes at the same time. According to Wilder, the reason a Japanese television series was being filmed in the United States was because of a longstanding desire by series creator Eiji Tsuburaya to have Ultraman produced in Hollywood due to Tsuburaya's admiration for the quality of series coming from there, but was unable to realize this ambition prior to his death.

Given the immense response to Ultraman: Towards the Future produced in Australia, there was a plan to expand and shift the project to Hollywood. This situation led Kazuo Tsuburaya, who was in charge of Tsuburaya Productions' business at the time, to collaborate with Bandai in 1991 to develop a new Ultraman project. Compared to the reboot of Towards the Future, the new Ultraman series focused on reconstructing the world and characters from the 1966 series Ultraman, incorporating Hollywood techniques with the aim of creating popular monsters. This concept became the guide for determining the direction of the next overseas expansion.

Ultraman: Towards the Future was broadcast in the United States in 1992 and achieved higher ratings. This trend significantly boosted Bandai America's product sales, leading to the introduction of the new Ultraman series in the U.S. This movement received approval from all relevant parties. In the summer of 1992, Japan's Gonzo production team collaborated with Bandai on the Ultraman: The Ultimate Hero project. The entire script and design for the series were completed in Japan by January 1993.

The series' filming was a collaboration with Major Havoc Entertainment in the United States. The American side, led by director King Wilder, was responsible for translating the script into English. He and other American writers then rewrote the script locally, taking budget constraints into account. Production and filming took place from the summer to the fall of 1993. The special effects scenes were primarily shot on open sets constructed in northern Los Angeles. The fight scenes were mainly filmed on these sets and other outdoor locations. Initially, the plan was to use the original designs of Ultraman and the monsters, but to ensure the uniqueness of the characters and for merchandise development, redesigns were made, incorporating more advanced special effects technology than what was available in Japan.

Although the costume designs are vastly considered impressive, the action was quite downplayed compared to other installments of the Ultraman Series and consisted mostly of the actors nudging each other and using attacks involving special effects with minimal physical contact, due to the costumes being fragile and fear by the production staff of damaging them after the hard work put into crafting them. Since Hollywood bore most of the production costs, the production control and rights were held by Hollywood. Tsuburaya Productions' rights were limited to merchandise sales within Japan.
