= Snip (TV series) =

1976 television series

- Genre: Sitcom
- Created by: James Komack
- Starring: David Brenner; Lesley Ann Warren; Walter Wanderman; Bebe Drake-Hooks; Hope Summers
- Country of origin: United States
- Original language: English
- No. of seasons: 1
- No. of episodes: 7 (5 aired, 2 unfinished)

Production
- Producer: Stan Cutler
- Running time: 24 minutes

Original release
- Network: NBC (intended)
- Release: 1976 (intended)

Snip is a 1976 comedy television series starring David Brenner about a hairdresser living in Cape Cod, Massachusetts, who has his ex-wife, daughter and former aunt living with him in his apartment. He and his ex-wife are both in the same hairdressing business under their boss and friend who is an openly gay man (played by Walter Wanderman). It was a take-off of the movie Shampoo and was created by James Komack, the creator of Chico and the Man and Welcome Back Kotter. Stan Cutler served as the developer.

Pre-broadcast reports about the series noted that it would include an openly gay character as a regular on the show, which was highly controversial at the time. The series was to premiere September 30, 1976, on NBC, but was shelved at the last minute and was never broadcast in the United States. The cancellation was so abrupt, bumpers promoting the show continued to be shown until just a few days prior to the canceled air date. TV Guide listed the show in its "Fall Preview" issue for that year. The show was featured as a full-page Thursday entry, but never made it to the Prime Time network grid. Seven episodes were filmed, but two were never edited. The five which were completed aired only in Australia. Variety later called this "the oddest case of a shelved show" and "one of the most infamous last-minute yanks" and David Brenner said that the show was cancelled because the network feared reaction to the gay character.

== See also ==
- List of television series canceled before airing an episode
