= Grace Parr (actress) =

Australian actress

- Born: Manila, Philippines
- Occupation: Actress
- Years active: 1987-2012

Grace Parr is an Australian actress. She co-starred in Prejudice for which she was nominated for the 1989 Australian Film Institute Award for Best Lead Actress in a Telefeature. Parr's other featured roles include the Japanese–Australian TV series Ultraman: Towards the Future, SBS TV's first continuing drama series The Girl from Steel City and the mini-series Vietnam.
