= Ira Angustain =

American actor

- Born: August 6, 1958 (age 67); Glendale, California, USA
- Occupations: Ordained minister, screenwriter, former actor
- Years active: 1969-1986

Ira Angustain (born August 6, 1958, in Glendale, California) is an American actor best known for his roles as Ricardo "Go Go" Gomez on The White Shadow and as Freddie Prinze in the made-for-TV movie Can You Hear the Laughter? The Story of Freddie Prinze. Angustain left acting shortly thereafter and became vice-president for a maintenance company and part-time screenwriter.

Today, Angustain is an ordained minister in Orange County, California.

== Filmography ==
Film and Television
Year	Title	Role	Notes
1969	80 Steps to Jonah	Pepe	Feature film
1969	A Time for Dying	Pepe	Feature film
1970	The Bold Ones: The Protectors	Julio Mendez	Episode: "The Carrier"
1970	Lancer	Johnny Crow	Episode: "Lamp in the Wilderness"
1977	Quincy, M.E.	Student at Protest	Episode: "...The Thigh Bone's Connected to the Knee Bone..."
1977	Billy Jack Goes to Washington	Meeting Attendee	Feature film
1977	Panic in Echo Park		Television film
1977	CHiPs	Rebel Student	Episode: "Career Day"
1978–1981	The White Shadow	Ricardo "Go-Go" Gomez	40 episodes
1979	Can You Hear the Laughter? The Story of Freddie Prinze	Freddie Prinze	Television film
1984	Whiz Kids	Miguel	Episode: "Maid in the USA"
1984	ABC Afterschool Special	Ramone	Episode: "The Hero Who Couldn't Read"
1986	Hill Street Blues	Limon	Episode: "I Come on My Knees"
