= Herbert Kenwith =

American television writer, director and producer (1917–2008)

- Born: July 14, 1917; New Jersey, U.S.
- Died: January 30, 2008 (aged 90); Los Angeles, California, U.S.
- Occupations: Writer, director, producer

Herbert Kenwith (July 14, 1917 – January 30, 2008) was an American television writer, director and producer.

Born in New Jersey. He directed several dozen episodes of many American television series, working often with Norman Lear. They include 9 to 5 (1986), Gimme a Break! (1981), Private Benjamin (1981), Bosom Buddies (1980), Diff'rent Strokes (1978), Me and Maxx (1980), Good Times (1974), Sanford and Son (1972), The Mary Tyler Moore Show (1970), Love, American Style (1969), and Star Trek (1969). He began his television career directing soap operas, including the first episode of The Young and the Restless.

Kenwith began his career appearing in Broadway shows, including “I Remember Mama” (with Marlon Brando, in his Broadway debut), later becoming a theater director and producer. According to his obituary, he was "Broadway’s youngest producer", earning praise for “Me and Molly”. For six years, Kenwith also helmed dozens of shows at McCarter Theatre for the summer stock program at Princeton University, directing many well-known actors.

He died from complications of prostate cancer at his home in Los Angeles.
