= Ultraman: Towards the Future =

Japanese–Australian television series

- Title card for the original English version
- Also known as: Ultraman Great
- Genre: Tokusatsu; Superhero; Kaiju; Science fiction
- Screenplay by: Terry Larsen
- Story by: Shō Aikawa; Hidenori Miyazawa; Chiaki Konaka; Akinori Endo; Satoshi Suzuki
- Directed by: Andrew Prowse
- Starring: Dore Kraus; Ralph Cotterill; Gia Carides; Rick Adams; Lloyd Morris; Grace Parr
- Composer: Shinsuke Kazato
- Countries of origin: Japan; Australia
- Original language: English
- No. of seasons: 1
- No. of episodes: 13

Production
- Executive producer: Noboru Tsuburaya
- Producers: Kiyoshi Suzuki; Sue Wild
- Production locations: South Australia, Australia
- Cinematography: Paul Dallwitz
- Editors: Richard Hindley; Nicholas Holmes
- Running time: 25 minutes
- Production companies: Tsuburaya Productions; South Australian Film Corporation

Original release
- Network: Syndication
- Release: January 4 – March 28, 1992

Related
- Ultraman: The Ultimate Hero

Ultraman: Towards the Future, released in Japan as Ultraman Great (ウルトラマンG(グレート), Urutoraman Gurēto), is an English-language tokusatsu science fiction television series produced by Japanese company Tsuburaya in partnership with the South Australian Film Corporation (SAFC). It is the tenth instalment in the Ultra Series, the first series to be produced during Japan's Heisei period and the second English-language production in the franchise after Ultraman: The Adventure Begins.

Despite being filmed in South Australia, the series did not initially air in Australia and instead was released direct to video and LaserDisc in Japan on 25 September 1990. The series aired in Japan in 1991 (rerun in 1995), and in the United States in 1992. The success of the series in the U.S. would inspire the creation of a follow-up production filmed there, Ultraman: The Ultimate Hero.

== Premise ==
Jack Shindo and Stanley Haggard are members of the first crewed expedition to Mars, and on the red planet find a giant sluglike monster, Gudis. Suddenly the alien giant, Ultraman Great, arrives and fights Gudis, but is knocked down for a period. Shindo is pinned by a rockslide and Haggard tries to escape in their ship, but it is blown up by Gudis. It is then that Ultraman Great gets up and when he is on the verge of victory, Gudis metamorphoses into a virus and travels to Earth, where it plans on corrupting all life, mutating other creatures into monsters and awakening existing ones. Needing a human host to survive on Earth, Ultraman Great joins with Jack, allowing him to become the colossal alien when all seems lost. He joins the Universal Multipurpose Agency, or UMA, in order to help them battle the monsters.

Halfway through the series Super Gudis reappears, more powerful than before. It imprisons Ultraman Great, but Jack distracts it by ultimately showing it the futility of its mission. Even if it does manage to corrupt all life, eventually there will be nothing else left to corrupt. The distraction allows Ultraman Great to break free and destroy Super Gudis once and for all. For the rest of the series, the environmental themes are stronger and the monsters usually arise from human pollution.

In the series finale, a doomsday scenario begins with the appearance of two powerful monsters, Kilazee and Kodalar, both of which try to wipe out the human race for abusing it. Ultraman Great is defeated by Kodalar, but Jack survives. Ultimately the humans use an ancient disc to destroy Kodalar by reflecting its own power at it, Ultraman Great defeats Kilazee and carries it into space, separating Jack from him and restoring him on Earth as a normal human. The victory is seen as another chance for the human race.

== Cast ==
- Dore Kraus as Jack Shindo / Ultraman Great
- Ralph Cotterill as Captain Arthur Grant
- Lloyd Morris as Charles Morgan
- Gia Carides as Jean Echo
- Rick Adams III as Lloyd Wilder
- Grace Parr as Kim Shaomin
- Ernie Dingo as Mudjudi
- David Grybowski as Ike
- Jay Hackett as Stanley Haggard
- Peter Raymond Powell as Lieutenant Brewster
- John Bonney as The Narrator
- Matthew O'Sullivan as Ultraman Great (voice)
- Steve Apps as Ultraman Great
- Robert Simper as Ultraman Great
- Michael Read as The Monsters
- Johnny Hallyday as The Monsters

== Episode list ==
No.	Title	Directed by	Written by	Original release date
1	"Signs of Life"	Andrew Prowse	Terry Larsen	January 4, 1992
2	"The Hibernator"	Andrew Prowse	Terry Larsen; Noboru Aikawa	January 11, 1992
3	"The Child's Dream"	Andrew Prowse	Terry Larsen; Hidenori Miyazawa	January 18, 1992
4	"The Storm Hunter"	Andrew Prowse	Terry Larsen; Chikai J. Konaka	January 25, 1992
5	"Blast from the Past"	Andrew Prowse	Terry Larsen; Akinori Endo	February 1, 1992
6	"The Showdown"	Andrew Prowse	Terry Larsen; Noboru Aikawa	February 8, 1992
7	"The Forest Guardian"	Andrew Prowse	Terry Larsen; Hidenori Miyazawa	February 15, 1992
8	"Bitter Harvest"	Andrew Prowse	Terry Larsen; Hidenori Miyazawa	February 22, 1992
9	"The Biospherians"	Andrew Prowse	Terry Larsen; Satoshi Suzuki	February 29, 1992
10	"Tourists from the Stars"	Andrew Prowse	Terry Larsen; Akinori Endo	March 7, 1992
11	"The Survivalists"	Andrew Prowse; Chikaki J. Konaka	Terry Larsen	March 14, 1992
12	"The Age of Plagues"	Andrew Prowse	Terry Larsen; Noboru Aikawa	March 21, 1992
13	"Nemesis"	Andrew Prowse	Terry Larsen; Noboru Aikawa	March 28, 1992

== Production ==
The series was produced by Japanese company Tsuburaya Productions in partnership with the SAFC. It was filmed in South Australia. Principal photography lasted for four months.

Terry Larsen provided the environmental and ecological themes for the show. Unlike previous instalments, spandex was used for Ultraman instead of a rubber suit. Director Andrew Prowse stated that the decision to employ spandex instead of the traditional rubber suit was made so that the "actor could move in it" and "reduce the risk of heat exhaustion" however, the suit actor passed out one day in the spandex suit. Steve Apps and Robert Simper performed the Ultraman suitmation sequences. Vicky Kite constructed the suits while Andrew Blaxland oversaw the production design.

== Release ==
The series did not initially air in Australia, instead being released direct to video and LaserDisc in Japan on 25 September 1990. The series aired in Japan in 1991 (rerun in 1995), and in the United States in 1992.

== Merchandising ==
=== Soundtrack ===
The music was composed by Shinsuke Kazato and performed by the Adelaide Symphony Orchestra. Most of the melodies and motifs are based on very similar music used in the 1987 anime Ultraman USA (a.k.a. Ultraman: The Adventure Begins), which was also scored by Shinsuke Kazato.

The Ultraman G soundtrack was first released by Nippon Columbia Co., Ltd in 1992 as stock number COCC-9745. It was re-released in 2007 as part of Nippon Columbia's "ANIMEX2000" series of inexpensive album reissues, under stock number COCC-72238. As of 2016, this version is still available for order from Japanese record stores.

=== Toy line ===
The series also received an equally short-lived toyline from DreamWorks toys. The figures were 10" tall and included Ultraman, who came with a mini Jack Shindo, as well as his enemies Bogun, Barrangas, Majaba, Gerukadon and Kilazee. Also released was a toy of the Hummer vehicle which included a mini figure of Charlie Morgan. A toy of the Saltop was advertised on the back of all boxes, though it was never released or produced according to a Bandai representative. Despite their unique size, the toys were not without their problems. Jack, Charlie and the Hummer were well out of scale with the other toys, while the Ultraman figure lacked articulation. Also, despite being the main villain for the first story arc, neither version of Gudis was released as a toy in the DreamWorks line (although one did appear in Bandai's Japanese vinyl Ultraman line).

=== Video game ===
A video game based on the series was released for Super Nintendo Entertainment System/Super Famicom. It is thought to have awkward controls and an unfairly high level of difficulty by many. It was based around the same engine as a Japanese Ultraman game based on the original series. In the game Ultraman fights Gudis, Bogun, Deganja, Barrangas, Super Gudis, Gazebo, Majaba, Kodalar, and Kilazee.

=== Comic book ===
A comic book retelling of/sequel to the show was published in the United States by Harvey Comics, kicked off in early 1993 under the "Ultracomics" label by a 3-issue miniseries written by Dwayne McDuffie, penciled by Ernie Colon, inked by Alfredo Alcala, and with cover art by Ken Steacy. The miniseries was followed in 1994 by an ongoing series, now published under Harvey's "Nemesis" label, written by Larry Yakata (with interior art still by Colon and Alcala). However, the comic treats Ultraman Great as the same Ultraman from the original 1966 series. The comic has also been known to confuse Ultraman: Towards the Future with the subsequent American-produced series, Ultraman: The Ultimate Hero (which was released as Ultraman Powered in Japan), of which the comic had included plenty of full-color publicity pictures in many issues to generate interest. After three issues of the miniseries and five issues (including a "Negative One") of the ongoing, the series was cancelled when Harvey ceased publishing comics entirely in mid-1994. Most of the issues had different collectible cover variants.

== Media ==
=== Other appearances ===
- Ultraman vs. Kamen Rider: This movie used Great's stock footage in the original series.
- Mega Monster Battle: Ultra Galaxy: Ultraman Great, along with other M78 Ultra Warriors, fights against the evil Ultraman Belial. However, this series does not reference other Ultramen that came to Earth and Great is not a member of the "Ultra Brothers".
- Ultra Galaxy Fight: The Absolute Conspiracy: Great appeared alongside fellow internationally-produced Ultraman, Ultraman Powered, in this 2020 YouTube miniseries, training fellow internationally-produced Ultraman, Ultraman Ribut. Great and Powered would then join Ribut in rescuing Ultraman Max.

=== International broadcast ===
In Thailand, this series aired on Channel 9 (is currently Channel 9 MCOT HD) in 1993 on Saturdays and Sundays late in the day. Sachs Family Entertainment distributed the show for American television via weekly syndication between 4 January 1992 and 28 March 1992. In Australia, this series aired on NWS9 in December 1993. In Spain, this series aired on TVE-1 (is currently La 1) alongside several other Ultramen shows, under the collective title of Ultraman. In Colombia, this series aired on Canal A in 1993, and in Chile, it aired on Chilevisión in 1994. In the United Kingdom, this series aired on Nickelodeon in 1994, referred to as just Ultraman.
