= Here's Boomer =

- Genre: Children/Family; Adventure/Drama
- Created by: Don Balluck; A. C. Lyles; Leon Tokatyan; Diana Bell Tokatyan
- Written by: Lowell Ganz; Edward Pomerantz; Arthur Silver; Sandy Veith
- Directed by: Claudio Guzmán; Herbert Kenwith; Paul Leaf; Victor Lobl; Sigmund Neufeld, Jr.
- Theme music composer: Edward Leonetti; Zoey Wilson
- Opening theme: "Boomer's Theme Song"
- Ending theme: "Boomer's Theme Song" (shortened)
- Composer: David Michael Frank
- Country of origin: United States
- Original language: English
- No. of seasons: 2
- No. of episodes: 24

Production
- Executive producers: A. C. Lyles; Daniel Wilson
- Producer: Fran Sears
- Running time: 22–24 minutes
- Production companies: A. C. Lyles Productions; Daniel Wilson Productions; Paramount Television

Original release
- Network: NBC
- Release: March 14, 1980 – August 14, 1982

Related
- A Christmas for Boomer; The Red Hand Gang

Here's Boomer is an American adventure/drama television series produced by Paramount Television that premiered on the NBC network on March 14, 1980. A television film called A Christmas for Boomer aired on December 6, 1979, and served as the pilot. A spin-off of the live-action series The Red Hand Gang, the show follows the adventures of the titular stray dog, "Boomer" and ran for two seasons, ending its run on August 14, 1982, with the final original episode, "Flatfoots," airing on July 3 of that year.

== Synopsis ==
The series followed the adventures of Boomer, a stray dog that traveled around helping people in trouble. The part of Boomer in all of the shows was played by a four-year-old mongrel named Johnny, who was trained by Ray Berwick. One early title considered for the series was Here's Johnny, after the dog who played the part, but was rejected owing to the use of that catch-phrase on The Tonight Show Starring Johnny Carson.

Johnny reportedly earned $3,500 a week while appearing on the series, and had a stunt dog who stood in for him on some of his more difficult tricks.

When the series was set to return in the fall of 1980, viewers were to hear Boomer's thoughts the same way viewers had heard Jackie Cooper's dog's thoughts on The People's Choice in the 1950s. However, Boomer's thoughts were only heard in one episode aired as a special on December 7, 1980. When the series returned with new episodes in 1981 the gimmick was dropped and viewers could no longer hear Boomer.

The premise of Here's Boomer was similar to that of the Benji films and television specials of the 1970s and 1980s. In real life, both Johnny and Higgins, the dog who first played Benji, were abandoned or lost mixed-breed dogs who were adopted from animal shelters by animal trainers in California. On screen, both played the parts of stray dogs who were smart, friendly, and loving of their human and animal friends.

The show bore a similarity to the Canadian TV series The Littlest Hobo, which was running at the same time on CTV Television Network in Canada and in syndication in the U.S. Both series are about a vagabond dog who helps people in trouble only to go on his way at the end of the episode, and both series even used similar title sequences involving split screens. The only significant difference between the shows was the breed of the dog in each show (London, the star of The Littlest Hobo, was a German Shepherd).

== Cast ==
The series featured a different cast each week. Guest stars include:

- John Amos
- Rosanna Arquette
- Scott Baio
- Kaye Ballard
- Tom Bosley
- Todd Bridges
- Dean Butler
- Patrick Cassidy
- Bill Dana
- Moosie Drier
- Jack Elam
- Michael J. Fox
- Jonathan Frakes
- Tracey Gold
- Rance Howard
- Ken Kercheval
- Matthew Laborteaux
- Tammy Lauren
- John Lawlor
- Meadowlark Lemon
- Rue McClanahan
- Roddy McDowall
- Stuart Pankin
- Gene Rayburn
- John Reilly
- Doris Roberts
- Natalie Schafer
- Charles Siebert
- Ron Silver

== Accolades ==
Year	Award	Category	Recipient	Result	Ref.
1980	Young Artist Award	Best TV Series for Family Entertainment	Here's Boomer	Nominated	
1980	Young Artist Award	Best Young Actress in a Television Series	Natasha Ryan	Nominated	

== Home media ==
On March 15, 2019, CBS Home Entertainment released both seasons on DVD in Region 1.
