= Peter Greenberg =

American travel journalist

Peter S. Greenberg
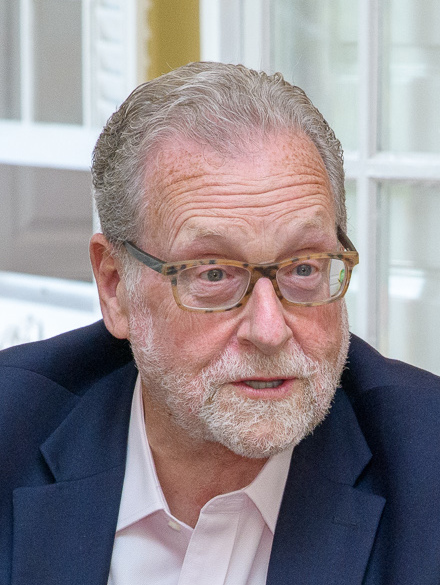
- Greenberg in 2021
- Occupation: Journalist

Peter S. Greenberg (born January 20, 1950) is an American journalist. He is the CBS News Travel Editor, reporting regularly on The Early Show, its replacement CBS This Morning, and the CBS Evening News. He may be best known as the Travel Editor for NBC's Today, CNBC and MSNBC from 1995 until 2009. Previous to NBC, Peter was Travel correspondent for ABC's Good Morning America from 1988 to 1995. Greenberg is an Emmy Award-winning journalist and television producer in his own right.

Also known as the "Travel Detective"—he has published several books with that moniker—Greenberg was brought to NBC's Today by Jeff Zucker. Previously, Greenberg was the West Coast correspondent for Newsweek, among other publications. In addition to his television duties, Greenberg produces a radio show, Eye on Travel, for CBS Radio; and an online travel site, PeterGreenberg.com. He also produces television specials, such as the highly rated "Inside American Airlines: A Week in the Life" and "Cruise Inc."

He also produces and hosts a television series called The Royal Tour which airs on PBS. The series features various heads of state giving Greenberg and viewers a personal tour of their country. It has featured a number of world leaders including New Zealand's Helen Clark, Israel's Benjamin Netanyahu, Abdullah II of Jordan, Peru's Alejandro Toledo, Mexico's Felipe Calderón, Rwanda's Paul Kagame, Poland's Mateusz Morawiecki and Tanzania's Samia Suluhu Hassan. Greenberg was previously the Travel Channel's chief correspondent.

Greenberg also produces and hosts The Travel Detective TV series on public television stations.

== Biography ==
Greenberg was born to a Jewish family. Before his current CBS Radio Show, he served as a talk show host on 790 KABC in Los Angeles. Greenberg served as Vice-President of television development for Paramount, where he helped develop such shows as MacGyver. At MGM, he ran the creative team that developed thirtysomething for ABC.

In 2012, Greenberg was inducted into the U.S. Travel Hall of Leaders, an award presented by the U.S. Travel Association.

== Books ==
His books include "The Best Places for Everything", "New Rules of the Road", and "Don't Go There: The Travel Detective's Essential Guide to the Must-Miss Places of the World".

Greenberg graduated from the University of Wisconsin–Madison.
