= Opportunity trap =

The opportunity trap is the social congestion in the competition for jobs when the number of applicants outstrips the demand for a particular group of workers – in particular, graduate school degree-holding applicants. It is distinct from an opportunity gap, which is a lack of equal opportunity. An example of fields where the number of applicants far outstrips the available opportunities includes humanities professors. Large numbers of graduate students complete PhD programs in English literature, history and music history, but there are only a handful of openings for professor positions. The PhD graduates who cannot find professorships may struggle with underemployment, for instance, by working at a job which does not require their education.

Many commentators, including human capital theorists and proponents of positional consensus theory, assert that there is a tightening relationship between education, jobs and rewards, and that in general, the more qualifications one has, the more employable one becomes. These ideas have informed policies to widen access to educational opportunities with the goal of promoting equality and maximising efficiency according to meritocratic ideals. However, it can be argued that this perspective fails to take into account the positional nature of qualifications–that is, an individual’s chances of getting a certain job are dependent both on their own skills and qualifications, and the skills and qualifications of the other applicants and on the number of other qualified applicants. Qualifications have both an absolute and a relative value–which diminishes the more people hold them. For example, in a society where 50% of the working population hold university degrees, they will be less valuable than in a society where only 5% hold them.

== Academic inflation ==
Taking this relative quality of qualifications into account, it can be argued that widening participation in higher education and qualifications will not necessarily deliver the rewards that human capital theorists have suggested, if the number of graduate degree-requiring jobs does not increase accordingly, and will instead lead to academic inflation:

‘If only a few adopt the same tactics to get ahead, such as intensifying efforts to get into a top university, do volunteer work to add value to one’s resume, or work late to impress the boss, it stands a chance of success. But if everyone adopts the same tactics, then no one gets ahead; it simply raises the entry bar or increases the number of hurdles’

According to this perspective, if everyone holds the same credentials no one gets ahead and the result is a kind of social congestion around sought-after jobs. Brown describes this as an "opportunity trap" since few individuals are able to opt out of the competition for jobs and most are compelled to strive for credentials in order to be considered employable. It is also argued that in this context of an increasing pool of graduate applicants, employers have been propelled to a stronger position of power as they are increasingly able to demand more from potential employees in a reverse auction. It has also been argued that this process has been exacerbated by offshoring and practices of Digital Taylorism in the workplace.

Despite the official U.S. unemployment rate staying at a low 4.3 percent through May 2026, many job seekers with advanced degrees are still reportedly having a hard time finding jobs. Years of declining job openings and tougher competition are behind this. The situation has been made even worse by major workforce cuts in sectors like the federal government, which have only added more candidates to an already crowded field.
