= Stan Cutler (screenwriter) =

American screenwriter

- Born: March 5, 1925; Newark, New Jersey, U.S.
- Died: January 25, 2019 (aged 93)
- Occupation: Screenwriter
- Years active: 1957–1994

Stan Cutler (March 5, 1925 – January 25, 2019) was an American screenwriter.

Cutler was born in Newark, New Jersey. He began writing for the NBC Matinee Theater in 1957. Then he wrote episodes for television programs including That Girl, The Partridge Family, Occasional Wife, The Second Hundred Years, 9 to 5, and The Courtship of Eddie's Father. He wrote 26 episodes of the sitcom The Farmer's Daughter. In 1976 he was developer for the new NBC sitcom Snip. His last screenwriting credit was in Small Wonder. After retiring, he wrote books for the Mark Bradley and Rayford Goodman series which was published by E. P. Dutton.

Cutler lived in Los Angeles with his wife. He died on January 25, 2019, at the age of 93.
