= Living apart together =

Living arrangement for couples

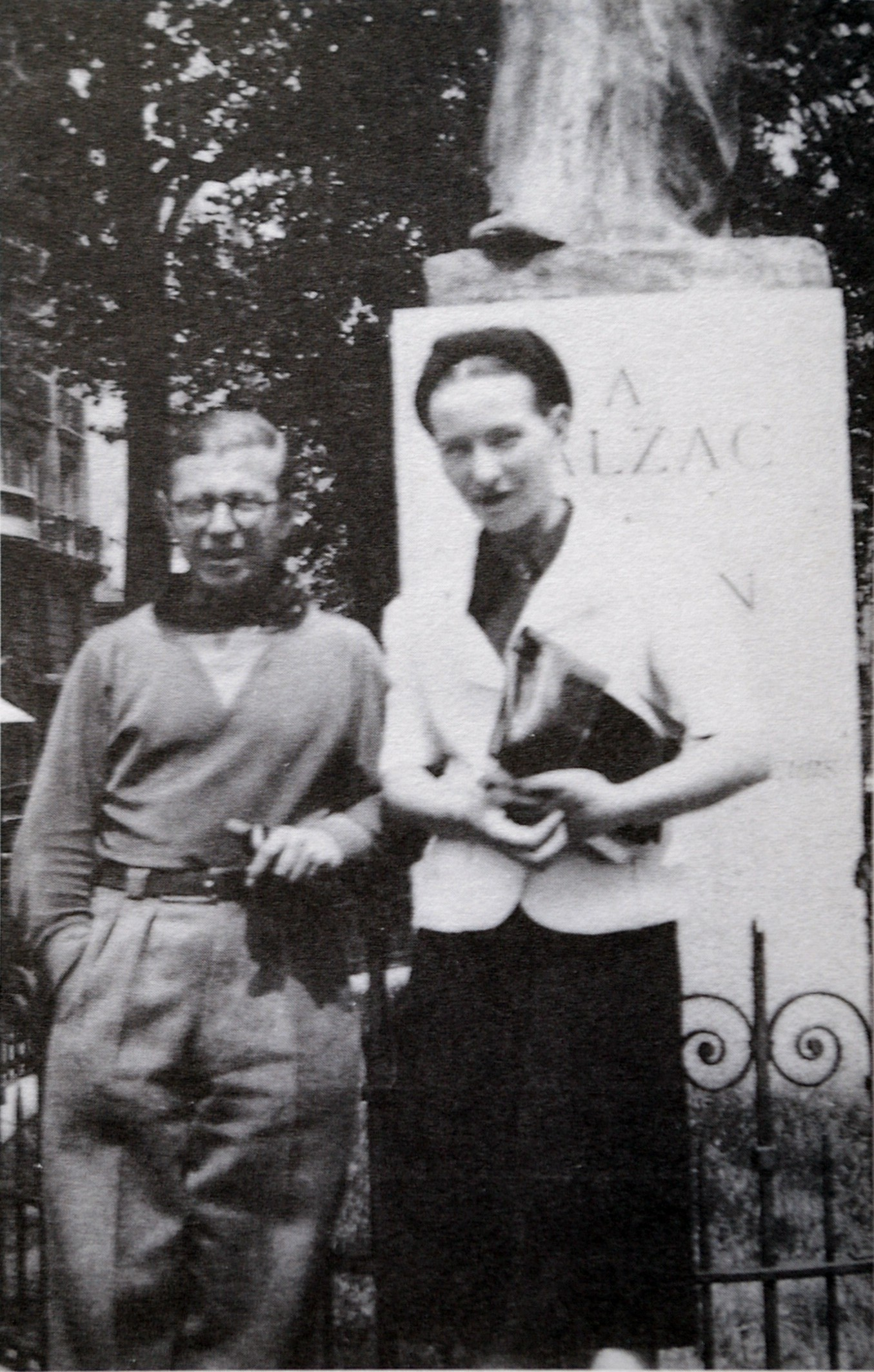
Jean-Paul Sartre and Simone de Beauvoir had a "living apart together" relationship.

Couples living apart together (LAT) have an intimate relationship but live at separate addresses. It includes couples who wish to live together but are not yet able to, as well as couples who prefer to (or must) live apart, for various reasons.

The term lat-relation became popular in the 1970s in the Netherlands, due to the movie Frank en Eva by Pim de la Parra, which had Living Apart Together as a tagline (and was internationally released as Living Apart Together).

In the early 2000s, LAT couples account for around 10% of adults in Britain (excluding those who live with family), and over a quarter of all those not married or cohabiting. Similar figures are recorded for other countries in northern Europe, including Belgium, France, Germany, the Netherlands, Norway and Sweden. Research suggests similar or even higher rates in southern Europe, although there LAT couples often remain in parental households. In Australia, Canada and the US representative surveys indicate that between 6% and 9% of unmarried adults has a partner who lives elsewhere. LAT is also increasingly understood and accepted publicly, is seen by most as good enough for partnering, and subject to the same expectations about commitment and fidelity as marriage or cohabitation.

Within Asia, "walking marriages" have been increasingly common in Beijing. Guo Jianmei, director of the center for women's studies at Beijing University, told a Newsday correspondent, "Walking marriages reflect sweeping changes in Chinese society." A "walking marriage" refers to a type of temporary marriage formed by the Mosuo of China, in which male partners live elsewhere and make nightly visits. A similar arrangement in Islam, called misyar marriage, also involves the husband and wife living separately but meeting regularly.

== Research ==
Some researchers have seen living apart together as a historically new family form. From this perspective LAT couples can pursue both the intimacy of being in a couple and at the same time preserve autonomy. Some LAT couples may even de-prioritize couple relationships and place more importance on friendship. Alternatively, others see LAT as just a 'stage' on the way to possible cohabitation and marriage. In this view LATs are not radical pioneers moving beyond the family, rather they are cautious and conservative, and simply show a lack of commitment. In addition many may simply be modern versions of 'steady' or long term boy/girlfriends.

Research using more comprehensive data suggests LAT couples are a heterogeneous social category with varying motivations for living apart. About a third see their relationship as too early for cohabitation, while others are prevented from living together, although they wish to do so, because of constraints like housing costs or (more rarely) job location. Many, however, prefer not to live together even though they have a long term relationship and could do so if they wanted. In practice motivations are often complex, for example one partner might wish to preserve the family home for existing children while the other might welcome autonomous time and space. Sometimes 'preference' can have a defensive motivation, for example the emotional desire to avoid the recurrence of a failed or unpleasant cohabiting relationship. Overall, LAT couples may be 'gladly apart'; 'regretfully apart' or, for many, undecided and ambivalent where they experience both advantages and disadvantages.

== Demographics ==
People living apart from their partner can be found in all age groups, although they are on average younger than cohabiting and married couples. In Britain almost 50% of LAT couples are in the youngest age group (18–24) although significant proportions are found in the 25–55 age group. Non-parents (those without current dependent children) are significantly more likely than parents to live apart from their partner. LAT couples are also found in all socio-economic groups, and in Britain show little difference to the class profile of the population as a whole.

According to the Census Bureau's "America's Families and Living Arrangements" data, the percentage of married couples living apart rose by 25% between 2000 and 2019. As of 2022, 3.89 million Americans were living apart from their spouses, a figure that represented nearly 3% of married Americans.

== In the life course ==
Living in LAT relationships means different things at different stages of the life course. Many LAT relationships among young adults and among adults with co-resident, dependent children are temporary and involuntary. However, Living Apart Together in Later Life (LLAT) are generally a stable alternative to living with a partner. Among older persons, priorities shift as the responsibilities of raising children and paid work diminish and a limited future increases a preference for effectively rich relationships. LLAT is well suited to this process. The low level of organization of LLAT relationships and the absence of many of the commitments and ties that characterize marriage put the focus on the emotional side of the relationship. Gender also shapes the appeal of LLAT. Swedish research showed that older women were significantly more motivated to live apart together to secure independence and avoid a traditional gendered division of labor. A segment of the middle-aged and empty nest population also values the independence and autonomy offered by LAT relationships. These couples may have previously been married, experienced negative outcomes from cohabitation, or are challenging traditional social norms.

== Attitudes ==
Living apart as a couple is increasingly understood and accepted. By 2006, in Britain, a majority (54 per cent) agreed that "a couple do not need to live together to have a strong relationship", with only 25 per cent disagreeing. By 2000 about one fifth of people aged 16–44 in Britain described 'living together apart' as their 'ideal relationship', compared to over 40 per cent for exclusive marriage and just under 20 per cent for unmarried cohabitation.

Attitudinally, LATs couples themselves resemble cohabitants in a 'young partners' group, as opposed to a more conservative 'older married' majority. Controlling for age LATs appear to be somewhat more liberal than other relationship categories for issues that directly affect them, for example about the effect of independence in relationships. However, for other controversial 'family' issues (like acceptance of same-sex partnership or of single motherhood) being a LAT in itself makes little difference, rather it is the relative traditionality of older married people that stands out compared to generally younger, and more liberal, unmarried cohabitants and LAT couples.

== Examples of couples ==
Famous and celebrity couples have been cited from the 19th century to the 21st century. For example, a 2007 Times article names Woody Allen and Mia Farrow (then living either side of Central Park, New York City), Margaret Drabble and Michael Holroyd (married 36 years as of 2018, separate homes), Helena Bonham Carter and Tim Burton and their two children (two houses next door to each other in Hampstead, London; separated in 2014), and Booker Prize winner Arundhati Roy and husband Pradip Krishen (with separate homes in Delhi, India).

In the 1840s, the famous composer Frédéric Chopin and the female novelist George Sand had an "unusual" relation that would be called LAT nowadays. The LAT relationship between philosopher Jean-Paul Sartre (1905–1980) and the feminist writer Simone de Beauvoir (1908–1986) is often cited (although was exceptional in that they also had other contemporaneous, if temporary, relationships). It is important to remember, however, that it is not just the rich and famous who live apart together, LAT is common amongst ordinary people in all social groups. The documentary Two's a Crowd documents a New York City couple that was forced to give up a LAT relationship because of the economic downturn of the late 2000s. The film depicts how the couple tries to set up two separate "apartments" within one, after they are forced to move in with each other.

== See also ==
- Long-distance relationship
- Singleton (lifestyle)
