= Scott Rogers =

American hiker (1961–2020)

John Scott Rogers (October 4, 1968 - July 10th, 2025) was an American hiker.

== Biography ==
Rogers was born in Savannah, Georgia on December 4, 1961. He became an amputee following an accident with a shotgun on Memorial Day 1998.

Several media outlets, including CNN, Associated Press, and NBC, reported extensively on his 2004 hike. Duncan Mansfield, AP writer from Knoxville, Tennessee, coined the term "bionic hiker".

Rogers died on November 27, 2020, after having tetraplegia for 40 years.
