= Tony Converse =

Tony Converse (born August 7, 1935) is a television and film producer who began his professional career in New York in 1957 upon graduation from Yale University (BA Drama).

== Early career ==
Having been President of the Yale Dramat (undergraduate theater) and Drama Critic for the Yale Daily News ( in a time when each week brought a new show heading for Broadway to New Haven ) helped in getting a job at CBS at a time when there were no TV schools and almost everyone involved in TV in New York came from a Theater background.

While employed as a production assistant at CBS TV, Converse also worked as an actor, stage manager and director in the legitimate theater, interrupted by two years in the army, where he became the program director for the Armed Forces Radio Network in Europe. On returning to the United States, he was assistant to the artistic directors of the American Shakespeare Festival at Stratford, Connecticut and the Williamstown (Mass.) Theater Festival.

== Secret Storm & Dick Cavett ==
In 1963 he returned to television as Producer of the daytime serial Secret Storm, producing well over 1000 episodes until 1969 when he left to produce The Dick Cavett Show. He created both the Emmy Award nominated summer prime time and late night Cavett formats and was responsible for many notable shows, such as "The Lunts and Noel Coward", "The Woodstock Rock Festival", and one-man shows with Groucho Marx and Jack Benny, as well as many highly controversial evenings on political topics during that volatile time.

== CBS Television ==
In 1971 Converse joined CBS Television as Program Executive and was responsible for the CBS Daytime 90's, a unit he created for the production of 90-minute tape dramas, developing over 60 original teleplays and executive producing 12. He received an Emmy nomination for this program.

Appointed Vice President for Special Programs at CBS in 1974, he was responsible for the development and supervised the production of such films as Minstrel Man, Circle of Children, The Defection of Simas Kudirka, In This House of Brede, The Secret Life of Chapman, Goldenrod, The Deadliest Season and The Amazing Howard Hughes. He was also instrumental in the development of and supervised for the network such shows as Sills and Burnett at the Met, The Body Human, The Chuck Jones Animated Specials and The Carter Inaugural Gala.

== EMI Television ==
In 1977 Converse joined Roger Gimbel's recently formed EMI Television Programs, Inc. as Vice President and Executive Producer. He has executive produced with Gimbel the TV films Forever, Deadman's Curve, Special Olympics, (Humanitas Award, Monte Carlo Film Festival Award, Christopher Award), Betrayal, The Cracker Factory, The Dark Side of Love, Survival of Dana, Can You Hear the Laughter, Orphan Train (Christopher Award), The Legend of Walks Far Woman, The Killing of Randy Webster (Monte Carlo Film Festival Nominee), Broken Promise (Film Advisory Board Award), A Question of Honor, The Manions of America, A Piano for Mrs. Cimino (Film Advisory Board Award, Monte Carlo Film Festival Award), Packin' It In, Deadly Encounter, Sessions, and Aurora.

== Symphony in the Glen ==
In 1994 he co-founded, with composer/conductor Arthur B. Rubinstein, Symphony in the Glen, a non-profit organization presenting free Chamber Symphony concerts in Los Angeles parks.

For several years he served as a Dramaturg at the National Playwright's Conference at the Eugene O'Neill Theater Center in Waterford CT.

== Legitimate Theater ==
In a return to his roots in the legitimate theater Converse, in 1998, co-produced Over the River and Through the Woods which ran 820 performances at the John Houseman Theater in New York and the musical The Thing About Men at the Promenade Theater which won the Outer Critics Circle Award as Best Musical of 2003- 2004 season .

He served for 15 years as a Board Member of the O'Neill Theater Center and, from its inception, Symphony in the Glen; he is also a member of the Caucus for Writers, Producers and Directors and past Governor of the Academy of Television Arts and Sciences.
