= List of Blossom characters =

The following is a list of characters for the American sitcom Blossom which aired for five seasons on NBC. It debuted as a pilot preview on July 5, 1990, and premiered as a mid-season replacement on January 3, 1991. The series finale episode was broadcast on May 22, 1995. Don Reo created the series, which starred Mayim Bialik as Blossom Russo, a teenager living with her father and two elder brothers. It was produced by Reo's Impact Zone Productions and Witt/Thomas Productions in association with Touchstone Television.

== Main characters ==
Character	Actor	Season				
Character	Actor	1	2	3	4	5
Blossom Russo	Mayim Bialik	Main	Main	Main	Main	Main
Joey Russo	Joey Lawrence	Main	Main	Main	Main	Main
Tony Russo	Michael Stoyanov	Main	Main	Main	Main	Main
Nick Russo	Ted Wass	Main	Main	Main	Main	Main
Six LeMuere	Jenna von Oÿ	Guest	Main	Main	Main	Main
Buzz Richman	Barnard Hughes		Main	Recurring	Recurring	
Vinnie Bonitardi	David Lascher		Guest	Main	Main	Guest
Rhonda Applegate	Portia Dawson			Main	Main	
Carol Russo	Finola Hughes				Recurring	Main
Kennedy Russo	Courtney Chase					Main

=== Blossom Ruby Russo ===
Blossom (Mayim Bialik) is the titular character and youngest child and only daughter of Nick and Maddy Russo. She is also the best friend of Six LeMuere and on-again off-again girlfriend of Vinnie Bonitardi. Blossom learns many hard lessons from the lives of herself, her family and Six, including about abuse, alcohol, drugs, divorce, and many more. Blossom is especially close to her family (including maternal grandfather, Buzz) and develops a strong relationship with her father and two brothers (partially due to the abandonment of her mother). In later seasons, after Nick remarries, Blossom resents but eventually grows to respect her stepmother Carol and new step-sister, Kennedy.

In one episode, Blossom learns from Nick that she was named after jazz singer Blossom Dearie.

=== Joseph "Joey" Russo ===
Joey (Joey Lawrence) is the middle child of the Russo family. He is a not-so-smart baseball player and ladies' man. Joey once questions his paternity after believing that there was a mixup at the hospital at the time of his birth (with Blossom and Tony joking that he lacks the Russo "nose"). He can be sweet and smart when he puts in the effort. Despite his dopiness, Joey gets accepted into Arizona State University, but decides to play professional baseball after graduating from high school. His catch phrase is "Whoa!”

Lawrence's real-life brothers, Matthew and Andrew, played younger versions of his character in several episodes of the series.

The character was called "Donnie" in the original pilot episode.

=== Anthony "Tony" Russo ===
Tony (Michael Stoyanov) is the eldest child of the Russo family. A recovering drug addict and alcoholic, he has difficulty remembering four years of his life, but still remembers his addictions well enough to warn Joey and Blossom of what happened, marijuana and alcohol having been crutches for the pressures of school life and their parents' separation. He works at a doughnut shop for a period before becoming a paramedic. He is very close to Blossom, who often comes to him for advice. He has a long-term relationship with a Playboy bunny, Rhonda, but later marries Shelly in Las Vegas, after a night of debauchery. Despite the suddenness of their wedding, they decide to give the relationship a try and ultimately decide to stay together. Tony and Shelly welcome a son, Nash Metropolitan Russo, in November 1994. In a crossover with The Fresh Prince of Bel-Air, Hilary Banks goes on a date with Tony after winning a charity auction.

The character was named after the show's executive producer Tony Thomas.

=== Nicholas "Nick" Russo ===
Nick (Ted Wass) is the father of Blossom, Joey and Tony and is the main caregiver for the Russo family after his wife, Maddy, leaves. He works as a piano player, playing various gigs with a wide range of bands. He and Carol eventually get married, making him the stepfather to Carol's daughter, Kennedy, and he later becomes the grandfather to Tony's child. Nick also treats Blossom's friend, Six, as his own daughter. Because of Tony's alcoholism and drug addiction, he has become overprotective of Joey and Blossom, and has developed a somewhat conservative attitude to parenting.

In the pilot, the father was named Terry Russo (played by Richard Masur), who worked as an accountant.

=== Six Dorothy LeMuere ===
Six (Jenna von Oÿ) is Blossom's best friend. Her parents are divorced. In the pilot, she alludes to the fact that she was named Six because of the number of beers her father drank in order to get her mother pregnant. A later explanation is that she was the sixth child in her family, although none of her siblings are ever seen. Six goes through many hard times including becoming an alcoholic, dating a married older man, and a pregnancy scare. She thinks of the Russo family as her own and talks rapidly when she is happy, angry, or nervous. She also has a crush on Joey.

Melissa Joan Hart said she was offered the role of Six but chose the lead role on Clarissa Explains It All instead. Don Reo contends he never considered anyone else for Six's role other than Jenna von Oÿ. For season 1 of Blossom, von Oÿ is credited in the pilot's opening sequence, but is listed in the closing credits as a "guest star". Between the shooting of the Blossom pilot and its pick-up as a regular series, von Oÿ had earned a part on the CBS sitcom Lenny (also from Witt/Thomas and Don Reo). With the cancellation of Lenny by March 1991, von Oÿ had reclaimed her originally intended status as a regular Blossom cast member and moved back to the opening credits in season two.

=== Frances "Buzz" Richman ===
Buzz (Barnard Hughes) is the father of Maddy and the grandfather of Blossom, Joey, and Tony. Buzz is a war veteran and has been married multiple times, but Ruby was his first and Maddy's mother. He loves women, cigars, jokes, and alcohol and moves into the Russo household for a while.

=== Vincent "Vinnie" Bonitardi ===
Vinnie (David Lascher) is Blossom's on-again, off-again boyfriend. Nick does not always like him, but their relationship improves over time. Vinnie gets along with Blossom's family for the most part and though he projects a tough-guy image, can be quite sweet at times.

=== Rhonda Jo Applegate ===
Rhonda (Portia Dawson) is Tony's former on-again, off-again girlfriend. Rhonda is a pin-up model on whom Joey also has a crush.

=== Carol Russo ===
Carol (Finola Hughes) is an Englishwoman with a daughter named Kennedy who eventually marries Nick, becoming the stepmother to his three children. She and Kennedy's father are divorced, but maintain an amicable relationship. In the penultimate episode of the series, Carol realizes that she is pregnant with Nick's child.

=== Kennedy Russo ===
Kennedy (Doren Fein [season 4 episode 21] & Courtney Chase) is Carol's daughter with Graham, Carol's Scottish ex-husband. She is a young, precocious English girl about age eight. She has puppy love for Joey for a period and after a while, bonds with Tony and Blossom.

== Supporting characters ==
=== Madeline "Maddy" Richman Russo ===
Maddy (Melissa Manchester) is the ex-wife of Nick and mother of Blossom, Joey and Tony who left the family to have her own life. She moves to Paris to pursue a singing career and returns a few years later in an attempt to reconnect, making her first appearance in the series in the season 3 episode "The Thrill is Gone."

In the pilot, the mother was named Barbara Russo (played by Barrie Youngfellow) and had not left the family.

=== Sharon LeMuere ===
Sharon (Gail Edwards) is the mother of Six who is divorced and dated Nick at one time. Sharon tries to be a good mother, although Six gets in some trouble at times. She is almost identical to her daughter in several ways, including her habit of talking very fast when nervous, upset, or happy. She and her daughter have been known to mirror each other on several occasions.

=== Shelly Lewis Russo ===
Shelly (Samaria Graham) is the wife of Tony and mother of Nash. She is an illustrator who planned to marry her boyfriend Roscoe in Las Vegas when she instead marries Tony in an impulse wedding. Despite their quick union, the couple falls in love and gives their relationship a try. With the aid of Blossom, Shelly gives birth to son Nash in the front seat of a vintage Nash Metropolitan during a freeway traffic jam, while Tony is in an ambulance being held at gun point.

=== Agnes ===
Agnes (Eileen Brennan) is Blossom's neighbor and confidant during the show's first season.

=== Mrs. Peterson ===
Mrs. Peterson (Phyllis Diller) is an elderly paramedic who is paired up with Tony when he joins the profession. She has a habit of smoking, which annoys Tony.

=== Carl Lewis ===
Carl (Ivory Ocean) is Shelly Lewis' father. A police officer, it is humorously revealed he once arrested Nick.

=== Frank ===
Frank (Kevin Jamal Woods) is Kennedy's friend who befriends her in the season 5 episode titled "The Wedding.”

== Guest appearances ==
=== Cameos ===
Throughout the series, there were a number of cameos and guest appearances from musicians, comedians, actors, actresses, and TV personalities.

- Ian Abercrombie as Mr. Winters
- ALF (as performed by Paul Fusco) as Himself
- Stephanie Beacham as Mrs. Robinson
- Richard Blackwell as Himself
- Sonny Bono as Himself
- Terry Bradshaw as Coach Morton
- Jere Burns as Himself
- C+C Music Factory as Themselves
- Tisha Campbell-Martin as Toni
- Jack Carter as Himself
- David Cassidy as Himself
- Dick Clark as Himself
- Robert Clivillés as Himself
- Bill Dana as Himself
- Zelma Davis as Herself
- Phyllis Diller Mrs. Peterson/herself
- Phil Donahue as Himself
- Dreyfuss the Dog as Himself
- Fabian as Himself
- David Faustino as Himself
- Lee Garlington as Samy
- Estelle Getty as Sophia Petrillo
- Omar Gooding as Brad/Tyler
- Mark-Paul Gosselaar as Kevin
- Arsenio Hall as Himself
- Mary Hart as Herself
- Neil Patrick Harris as "The Charming" Derek Slade
- Hugh Hefner as Himself
- B.B. King as Himself
- Don King as Himself
- Reggie Jackson as Himself
- Eric Allan Kramer as Wildman Boyette
- Timothy Leary as Himself
- Jane Leeves as Sheila
- David Leisure as Himself
- Little Richard as Himself
- Warren Littlefield as Himself
- Dinah Manoff as Herself
- Dick Martin as Frosty the Clown
- Sam McMurray as Sergio
- Keith Morrison as Himself
- Joel Murray as Doug LeMuere
- Karyn Parsons as Hilary Banks
- Mr. T as Himself
- Tommy Newsom as Himself
- The Party (Albert Fields, Tiffini Hale, Chasen Hampton, Deedee Magno, Damon Pampolina) as Themselves
- Rhea Perlman as The Fairy Godmother
- Wolfgang Puck as Himself
- Martha Quinn as Herself
- Phylicia Rashad as Blossom's Dream Mom
- John Ratzenberger as Himself
- Fred Roggin as Himself
- Salt-N-Pepa as Themselves
- Talia Shire as Herself
- Kent Shocknek as Himself
- Will Smith as The Fresh Prince (uncredited)
- Tori Spelling as Herself
- Robert Stack as Himself
- Parker Stevenson as Jim/Scott Alexander
- Todd Susman as Todd/Steve
- Tiffani-Amber Thiessen as Ricki
- Alex Trebek as Himself
- Jimmie Walker as Himself
- Slappy White as Himself

=== Other notable guests ===
Actors who would become famous later in their careers also appeared as guests:

- David Arquette as David Slackmeir
- Christopher Daniel Barnes as Steve/Farnsworth/Terry
- Abraham Benrubi as Francis
- Jonathan Brandis as Stevie
- Stephen Dorff as Bobby
- David DeLuise as Randy
- Brian George as Shakir
- Joely Fisher as Bambi
- Johnny Galecki as Jason
- Tobey Maguire as Boy
- James Marsden as Josh
- Jason Marsden as Eddie Warwick/Jimmy
- Lochlyn Munro as Evan Henderson
- Brittany Murphy as Wendy
- Leah Remini as Ellen
- Giovanni Ribisi as Mitchell
- Stephen Root as Louie
- Debra Jo Rupp as Lucy Robinson
- David Schwimmer as Sonny Catalano
- Brenda Strong as Diane
- Christine Taylor as Patti
- Scott Wolf as Gordon "Gordo" McCain
- Justin Whalin as William Zimmerman/Jordan Taylor/Jimmy
