= List of Blossom episodes =

The following is a list of episodes for the sitcom Blossom. The pilot episode premiered on NBC on July 5, 1990 before airing as a regular series from January 3, 1991 to May 22, 1995. A total of 114 episodes were produced spanning 5 seasons.

== Series overview ==
At present, the first two seasons have been released in one DVD box set by Shout! Factory.

Season	Episodes	Originally released		Rank	Rating	Viewers (millions)
Season	Episodes	First released	Last released	Rank	Rating	Viewers (millions)
1	14	July 5, 1990	April 29, 1991	46	12.1	19.0
2	24	September 16, 1991	May 4, 1992	33	12.9	20.4
3	26	August 10, 1992	May 17, 1993	27	13.5	21.0
4	28	September 24, 1993	May 23, 1994	32	12.2	18.5
5	22	September 26, 1994	May 22, 1995	55	10.4	15.6

== Episodes ==
=== Season 1 (1990–91) ===
No. overall	No. in season	Title	Directed by	Written by	Original release date	Prod. code	Viewers (millions)
1	1	"Pilot"	Terry Hughes	Don Reo	July 5, 1990	000	21.0
Blossom hears her parents arguing, they tell Blossom they have an appointment with a lawyer. Blossom dreams about what it will be like if her parents divorce.
2	2	"Blossom Blossoms"	Zane Buzby	Racelle Rossett Schaefer	January 3, 1991	002	32.2
When Blossom starts her period she tries to find a way to talk to her dad without being embarrassed. Guest star: Phylicia Rashad
3	3	"My Sister's Keeper"	Zane Buzby	Bill Richmond	January 7, 1991	007	20.3
Blossom is going out on her first prom date with Joey's friend Bobby (Stephen Dorff). Nick does not want her to go out with him after Joey warns him about his reputation as a ladies man.
4	4	"Dad's Girlfriend"	Zane Buzby	Judith D. Allison	January 14, 1991	006	19.7
Blossom has problems with her dad's new girlfriend (Debra Engle). Rhea Perlman appears in a dream sequence as her fairy godmother.
5	5	"Who's in Charge Here?"	Zane Buzby	Paul Perlove	January 21, 1991	003	17.0
When Blossom is in charge of the home for one night, while her father performs on a cruise ship, she sees Tony's new girlfriend (Nile Lanning) stealing a family heirloom. Guest star: Little Richard.
6	6	"Sex, Lies and Teenagers"	Zane Buzby	Paul Perlove	February 4, 1991	009	18.7
Blossom sneaks off to a make-out party. Phil Donahue appears as a fictionalized version of himself in a cameo. Blossom's date at the make-out party (Johnny Galecki), would later become Mayim's future co-star on The Big Bang Theory. Guest star: Brenda Strong as Diane and Johnny Galecki as Jason
7	7	"I Ain't Got No Buddy"	Zane Buzby	David Landsberg	February 11, 1991	005	16.3
Six befriends a new student (Aimee Brooks), and Blossom feels left out. Guest star: Estelle Getty as Sophia Petrillo
8	8	"Thanks for the Memorex"	Zane Buzby	Racelle Rossett Schaefer	February 18, 1991	010	20.4
Inspired by old home movies Blossom transferred to video, the family goes to the cabin by the lake.
9	9	"The Geek"	Zane Buzby	Brenda Hampton & William C. Kenny	February 25, 1991	004	17.3
When she gets tricked to go to the homecoming dance with a school geek (Chris Demetral), Blossom blames herself. Joey wants to get his driver's license. Guest star: ALF
10	10	"Tough Love"	Zane Buzby	Josh Goldstein & Jonathan Prince	March 4, 1991	008	16.0
Tony gets an ultimatum from his dad: get a job or get out of the house. Guest star: Sonny Bono
11	11	"Such a Night"	Zane Buzby	Judith D. Allison & Don Reo	March 11, 1991	011	16.7
Blossom asks for help from Six, when calling a boy for a date. Tony helps a friend (Billy Morrissette) stay sober. Joey is given a hard lesson in mathematics.
12	12	"School Daze"	Zane Buzby	Don Reo	March 25, 1991	001	16.6
Blossom plans to drop out of her private school and go to a public school. Joey schemes to pass a history test.
13	13	"Papa's Little Dividend"	Zane Buzby	Nancy Beverly	April 8, 1991	012	15.7
A woman (Megan Gallagher) claims that Nick is the father of her child. Tony prepares for a blind date.
14	14	"Love Stinks!"	Zane Buzby	Racelle Rossett Schaefer	April 29, 1991	013	18.4
Blossom gets her heart broken, when a guy (Joshua Hoffman) tells her that he has found somebody else.

=== Season 2 (1991–92) ===
No. overall	No. in season	Title	Directed by	Written by	Original release date	Prod. code	Viewers (millions)
15	1	"Second Base"	Zane Buzby	Racelle Rossett Schaefer	September 16, 1991	015	16.5
Blossom does not know if she wants Jimmy to go to second base. Tony prepares for an earthquake. Guest star: Reggie Jackson appears in a cameo
16	2	"Here Comes the Buzz!"	Zane Buzby	Bill Richmond	September 23, 1991	014	20.2
Nick's control is undermined when his ex-father-in-law (Barnard Hughes) comes for a visit. Guest star: Tisha Campbell-Martin as Toni
17	3	"The Joint"	Zane Buzby	Judith D. Allison	September 30, 1991	016	17.7
Nick finds a marijuana cigarette in the house.
18	4	"I'm with the Band"	Zane Buzby	Josh Goldstein & Jonathan Prince	October 7, 1991	017	18.5
Blossom is on a school band trip, and Nick fears Anthony is messing around. Guest star: Will Smith (The Fresh Prince of Bel-Air) under his rap stage name, The Fresh Prince
19	5	"Honor?"	Zane Buzby	J.J. Wall	October 14, 1991	018	18.5
Joey cheats and gets into the advanced English class. An old friend of Blossom's (Chris Demetral in a different role from "The Geek") spreads a rumor that she is a "naughty girl".
20	6	"To Tell the Truth"	Zane Buzby	Glen Merzer	October 21, 1991	020	19.4
Blossom gets a crush on a boy (Jonathan Brandis), who is interested in Six. Tony worries that his past drug problems will ruin his job interview. Guest star: Tisha Campbell-Martin guest stars as Toni
21	7	"Intervention"	Zane Buzby	Judith D. Allison & Don Reo	November 4, 1991	021	20.4
Tony thinks his friend might be getting hooked (Matt Levin). Nick misses an important phone call.
22	8	"Run for the Border"	Zane Buzby	Brenda Hampton	November 11, 1991	022	21.7
Joey falls for a colleague (Karla Montana) who can only speak Spanish. Six is worried that her parents are getting a divorce. Tony saves a famous photographer's life (Sam McMurray).
23	9	"Rockumentary"	Zane Buzby	Judith D. Allison & Don Reo	November 18, 1991	023	19.9
Confined to bed with a cold, Blossom dreams she is a famous singer when she falls asleep while watching Madonna: Truth or Dare. Guest stars: Don King as himself, David Faustino as himself, Neil Patrick Harris as Derek Slade, and Richard Blackwell as himself
24	10	"Expectations"	Zane Buzby	Don Reo & Judith D. Allison	November 25, 1991	019	21.5
When Nick brings home a new love interest (Susan Anton), everyone has bizarre fantasies about her.
25	11	"You Can't Go Home"	Zane Buzby	Portian Iversen	December 2, 1991	024	21.7
Six and Blossom hope their single parents will fall in love.
26	12	"This Old House"	Zane Buzby	Racelle Rossett Schaefer	December 9, 1991	025	18.4
Nick considers selling the house, when he cannot make the payments.
27	13	"It's a Marginal Life"	Zane Buzby	Don Reo	December 16, 1991	026	18.3
The musicians' strike forces Nick to take a job in a mall organ store during the holidays.
28	14	"The Test"	Zane Buzby	Susan Tenney	January 6, 1992	027	21.0
Blossom suffers from nerves while taking the PSAT. Tony goes to the horse track with Buzz.
29	15	"Hot for Teacher"	Zane Buzby	Josh Goldstein & Jonathan Prince	January 13, 1992	028	22.1
Blossom has a crush on her happily married substitute teacher (Parker Stevenson).
30	16	"Three O'Clock and All Is Hell"	Zane Buzby	Brenda Hampton	January 20, 1992	029	22.0
During a household management class exercise, Blossom is paired with a tough guy (Danny Nucci), and gets targeted by his girlfriend. Nick is interviewed by his old high school newspaper. Tony is afraid of falling off the wagon when he takes drugs for a toothache. Guest star: Debra Jo Rupp as Lucy Robinson
31	17	"Losers Win"	Zane Buzby	J.J. Wall	February 10, 1992	031	19.7
Blossom has a problem with public speaking. Miss June's life is saved by Tony. Nick practices for appearing in a Paula Abdul video.
32	18	"The Letter"	Zane Buzby	Don Reo & Judith D. Allison	February 17, 1992	033	21.9
Mom's 40th birthday is coming up, and the family makes a video birthday card. Guest stars: Salt-N-Pepa as themselves
33	19	"Wake Up Little Susie"	Ted Wass	Portia Iversen	February 24, 1992	034	23.5
An older girl (Brooke Theiss) uses Blossom as a cover one night when she wants to go on a date. Guest star: Karyn Parsons (The Fresh Prince of Bel-Air) as her Fresh Prince character, Hilary Banks.
34	20	"You Must Remember This"	Zane Buzby	Eve Needleman	March 2, 1992	035	23.7
Blossom and Six wait in line for C+C Music Factory tickets. Joey gets a job as a babysitter. A female co-worker is hostile against Anthony. Guest stars: Debra Jo Rupp as Lucy Robinson and Leah Remini as Ellen
35	21	"House Guests"	Zane Buzby	Glen Merzer	March 23, 1992	032	22.6
Six and her mother stay at the Russo house while their house is being sprayed by an exterminator. A 12-year-old boy (James Madio) has a crush on Blossom. Guest stars: Brenda Strong as Diane and Joel Murray as Doug LeMeure
36	22	"Whines and Misdemeanors"	Zane Buzby	Jonathan Schmock	April 6, 1992	030	19.9
The Russo clan is caught in various lies as Blossom being late to class and lying to the vice-principal (Jonathan Prince) gets her detention while Nick spends the night with a country singer. Guest star: Abraham Benrubi as Francis
37	23	"Driver's Education"	Zane Buzby	Shelley Karol	April 27, 1992	036	19.6
Blossom cries to pass her driver's test. Joey is being sexually harassed by his boss (Tiffani Thiessen).
38	24	"Spring Fever"	Zane Buzby	Brenda Hampton	May 4, 1992	037	20.5
Joey and Six are the only ones without a date.

=== Season 3 (1992–93) ===
No. overall	No. in season	Title	Directed by	Written by	Original release date	Prod. code	Viewers (millions)
39	1	"Runaway"	Bill Bixby	Don Reo	August 10, 1992	038	18.7
Nick finds out that Blossom has run away with Vinnie.
40	2	"Dear Mom"	Bill Bixby	Don Reo	August 17, 1992	039	17.1
Blossom writes to her mom about Vinnie and the family.
41	3	"No Cure for Love"	Ted Wass	Glen Merzer	August 24, 1992	042	19.2
Tony gets depressed when he splits up with Rhonda. Vinnie suggests that he and Blossom should see other people. A girl Joey breaks up (Lisa Rieffel) with is in an accident, and he thinks it is his fault.
42	4	"What Price Love?"	Bill Bixby	Eve Needleman	September 14, 1992	041	20.2
Joey contacts an escort service (Cathryn de Prume). Blossom's friendship with Six is threatened by a new romance.
43	5	"The Joey Chronicles"	Bill Bixby	Don Reo	September 21, 1992	040	20.5
Joey writes a story about himself, but is distracted by fantasies of beautiful women. Vinnie wants to go out with his ex-girlfriend.
44	6	"Kids"	Bill Bixby	Don Reo	September 28, 1992	043	21.6
Vinnie is in a coma after a motorcycle accident.
45	7	"Only When I Laugh"	Bill Bixby	Bill Richmond	October 5, 1992	045	20.8
Blossom and Six want to get fake ID's to get into a club. Tony wants to have the funeral for a patient in the house.
46	8	"I Killed Chico Barranca"	Bill Bixby	J.J. Wall	October 12, 1992	046	23.3
Stolen items turn up in their garage sale, and Blossom and Six are arrested. A baseball scout visits Joey.
47	9	"All Hallows Eve"	Bill Bixby	Brenda Hampton	October 26, 1992	048	22.9
Joey is grounded on Halloween. Nick, Tony and Buzz, dressed as Wilson Phillips, have their car break down outside a very macho bar.
48	10	"The Making of the President"	Bill Bixby	George Tricker	November 9, 1992	044	20.4
Blossom and the popular Eddie Warwick run for president of the student council. Guest star: Timothy Leary appears in a cameo
49	11	"My Girl"	Bill Bixby	Shelley Karol	November 16, 1992	049	21.2
Blossom films her family. Joey thinks he was switched at birth.
50	12	"The Frat Party"	Bill Bixby	J.J. Wall	November 23, 1992	052	21.3
Blossom and Six attend a frat party. Blossom later wakes up half nude in a frat boy's (Christopher Daniel Barnes) bed when it turned out that she drank spiked punch. Rhonda's apartment is getting fumigated, so she moves in with Tony. Joey falls for his math tutor (Brooke Alexander).
51	13	"Losing Your... Religion"	Bill Bixby	Josh Goldstein & Jonathan Prince	December 7, 1992	047	22.4
Six is considering having sex with her new boyfriend (Mark-Paul Gosselaar). Blossom seeks information about Judaism from a wisecracking rabbi, played by Guest star Alan King. Joey and Anthony buy a car together.
52	14	"Ruby"	Bill Bixby	Bill Richmond	December 21, 1992	051	18.8
Buzz encourages Blossom to go to Harvard by telling her about his World War II era romance.
53	15	"The Last Laugh"	Ted Wass	Susan Tenney	January 4, 1993	054	22.0
Nick dates a stand up comic (Carol Barbee), but is upset when she makes fun of him on The Arsenio Hall Show. Joey falls in love with Rhonda's niece (Gina Philips). Blossom and Six makes a video about safe sex, but it gets turned down by the vice principal (Steven Gilborn).
54	16	"Time"	Bill Bixby	Don Reo	January 11, 1993	053	21.8
Joey receives a college letter of acceptance, but is too nervous to open it. Blossom and Six ponder the passage of time. Tony pops the question to Rhonda.
55	17	"Car Wrecks and Marriage"	Ted Wass	J.J. Wall	January 18, 1993	056	24.5
Blossom accompanies Six on a practice drive. Buzz gets married. Two beautiful models (Monia Lauren & April Storms) visit Joey, but no one believes him.
56	18	"Mystery Train"	Bill Bixby	Don Reo	February 1, 1993	057	22.7
Nick gets a visit from an old friend (Keith Allison). Vinnie asks Blossom out on a prom date. Joey and Tony have a close encounter with a UFO.
57	19	"Best Laid Plans of Mice and Men"	Bill Bixby	Jonathan Schmock	February 8, 1993	059	22.9
Nick gets a Disneyland job as an Elvis impersonator. Blossom sees Vinnie with his cousin.
58	20	"Student Films"	Jonathan Prince	Josh Goldstein & Jonathan Prince	February 15, 1993	058	24.4
The family watch the student films they have made.
59	21	"All Dressed Up"	Bill Bixby	Brenda Hampton	February 22, 1993	060	23.6
Blossom finds out that Vinnie is not a virgin. Joey dates a pregnant girl (Ashlee Levitch).
60	22	"The Thrill Is Gone"	Ted Wass	Don Reo	March 1, 1993	055	21.0
Blossom's mother (Melissa Manchester) reflects on her breakup with Nick. Guest star: B.B. King.
61	23	"You Did What?"	Bill Bixby	Judith D. Allison	April 12, 1993	062	18.7
The kids help Nick with his money problems. Joey speculates in baseball cards. Tony tries to sell cosmetics by phone.
62	24	"Sitcom"	Bill Bixby	Don Reo	May 3, 1993	050	18.4
Nick and a friend pitch a sitcom to the network based on the Russo family, but Six gets cast as Blossom.
63	25	"Hunger"	Bill Bixby	Glen Merzer	May 10, 1993	061	18.2
Blossom thinks Six may be bulimic. Guest star: Stephanie Beacham as Mrs. Robinson
64	26	"Paris"	Bill Bixby	David Reo	May 17, 1993	063	18.9
Blossom wants to visit her mother in Paris.

=== Season 4 (1993–94) ===
No. overall	No. in season	Title	Directed by	Written by	Original release date	Prod. code	Viewers (millions)
65	1	"Blossom in Paris"	John Whitesell	Judith D. Allison & Don Reo	September 24, 1993	064	10.1
66	2	"Blossom in Paris"	John Whitesell	Judith D. Allison & Don Reo	September 24, 1993	065	10.1
67	3	"Blossom in Paris"	John Whitesell	Judith D. Allison & Don Reo	September 24, 1993	066	10.1
68	4	"Blossom in Paris"	John Whitesell	Judith D. Allison & Don Reo	September 24, 1993	067	10.1
Blossom arrives in Paris to visit her mother. Joey and Tony take jobs as air couriers to Paris. Blossom finds a new boyfriend in Paris. Vinnie visits Blossom in Paris. Tony and Joey are followed by a mysterious person. Nick spends the night with Six's mother. Blossom must decide whether to stay in Paris with her mother or to go back home to L.A.
69	5	"Transitions"	Bill Bixby	Judith D. Allison & Don Reo	September 27, 1993	068	22.6
Joey and his dad go fishing together. Blossom finds out that Six is abusing alcohol.
70	6	"Kiss and Tell"	Bill Bixby	Brenda Hampton	October 4, 1993	069	21.3
Maddy returns with the intention of staying. Six rides along with Tony and a cranky EMT.
71	7	"Six and Sonny"	Bill Bixby	J.J. Wall	October 11, 1993	072	20.3
Six dates a married ex-con named Sonny (David Schwimmer) ten years older than she is. The President writes a letter to Joey, asking for his advice. Vinnie and Tony set up an illegal cable hookup.
72	8	"Blossom's Dilemma"	Bill Bixby	J.J. Wall	October 18, 1993	073	20.4
Six runs off to Vegas with Sonny.
73	9	".38 Special"	Ted Wass	David Reo	October 25, 1993	071	19.3
Blossom sees a gun at school and struggles to decide whether or not to report the student (Devon Gummersall) who brought it. Joey meets an alcoholic clown. Guest star: Dick Martin as "Frosty the Clown." David Reo (writer) has a cameo as one of the musicians.
74	10	"The Fifty-Minute Hour"	Bill Bixby	Josh Goldstein & Jonathan Prince	November 1, 1993	070	21.4
Nick is in a psychiatrist's (Richard Roat) office in the near future and remembers the good old days.
75	11	"True Romance"	Bill Bixby	Rob LaZebnik	November 8, 1993	075	21.4
Tony and Joey visit The Playboy Mansion. Blossom writes a romance novel to pay for her college education.
76	12	"Let's Talk About Sex"	Bill Bixby	Bill Richmond	November 15, 1993	074	23.2
Blossom feels Vinnie is no longer interested in her. Six tries to seduce Joey. Nick finds out that his date (Blaire Baron) has had sex with Tony. Note: This episode was the last to air before director Bill Bixby's death from prostate cancer. The day this episode aired, Bixby collapsed on the set while directing the episode "Meat" and died six days later.
77	13	"Big Doings: Part 1"	Ted Wass	J.J. Wall	November 22, 1993	076	18.5
While in Las Vegas, Tony starts drinking again. The family tries to accept Nick's new girlfriend (Finola Hughes). Meanwhile, Six thinks she might be pregnant.
78	14	"Big Doings: Part 2"	Ted Wass	J.J. Wall	November 29, 1993	077	26.3
After a night of drinking, Tony finds out he is married. Vinnie proposes to Blossom. Six takes a pregnancy test.
79	15	"Copycat"	Ted Wass	Glen Merzer	December 13, 1993	081	18.8
A new student (Ellen Blain) imitates Blossom. Tony resembles a character in Shelley's book.
80	16	"Getting Lucky"	Bill Bixby	Brenda Hampton	January 10, 1994	078	22.1
Blossom realizes that Nick is in love with Carol. Joey worries that sex will ruin the relationship with his new girlfriend. Note: This was the last episode Bill Bixby completed directing.
81	17	"Meat"	Bill Bixby & Selig Frank	Glen Merzer	January 24, 1994	079	21.1
Blossom and her supervisor (Lochlyn Munro) are at a homeless shelter. Nick becomes a vegetarian. Tony cannot stand a waiter's (Marty Pollio) racial slurs. Note: Selig Frank finished directing this episode after Bill Bixby collapsed on the set.
82	18	"Double Date"	Joe Bergen	Glen Merzer	January 31, 1994	080	24.0
Six's date Gordon "Gordo" McCain (Scott Wolf) makes a pass at Blossom. A gay teammate (Paul Wittenburg) turns out to be Joey's secret admirer. Tony's father-in-law discovers that he arrested Nick in the 1970s.
83	19	"Beach Blanket Blossom: Part 1"	Peter Baldwin	Jonathan Schmock	February 14, 1994	084	18.6
A spoof of 60s beach movies.
84	20	"Beach Blanket Blossom: Part 2"	Peter Baldwin	Jonathan Schmock	February 21, 1994	085	16.6
Fabian, Phyllis Diller and Jimmie Walker join Blossom's beach party fantasy.
85	21	"A Little Help from My Friends"	Peter Baldwin	Jonathan Schmock	February 28, 1994	083	18.6
A teammate (David DeLuise) is using steroids, and Joey turns to a childhood imaginary friend Mr. T for help. Blossom babysits Carol's daughter, but is invited to a concert.
86	22	"Our Favorite Scenes"	Peter Baldwin	Judith D. Allison	March 14, 1994	091	15.5
Clip show featuring cast members introducing their favorite clips.
87	23	"Blue Blossom"	Peter Baldwin	Brenda Hampton	March 19, 1994	087	11.0
Blossom feels blue when her 17th birthday comes up. Joey writes a letter to Hillary Clinton. Carol's ex (Alastair Duncan) has an odd proposal for Nick. Shelly has not told her cousin (Michole Briana White) that Tony is white.
88	24	"Sex, Lies and Mrs. Peterson"	Peter Baldwin	Roger Garrett	April 2, 1994	082	9.9
Blossom and Tony try to fix up Buzz with the cranky Mrs. Peterson.
89	25	"Seven Deadly Sins"	Peter Baldwin	Glenn Merzer	April 9, 1994	089	8.7
Two aliens in a flying saucer (voiced by Joey Lawrence and Michael Stoyanov) choose the Russo home for their observations of human behavior.
90	26	"Night of Reckoning"	Joe Bergen	Brenda Hampton	May 2, 1994	086	15.7
Joey recalls his mom's history of broken promises. Rhonda returns unexpectedly. Nick takes Blossom and Six to the drive-in.
91	27	"Last Tango"	Peter Baldwin	Jonathan Schmock	May 9, 1994	088	18.7
Vinnie is accepted to an Ivy League school. Six is escorted to the prom by a nerdy foreign student with a hidden talent (Jonathan Del Arco). Nick and Carol act like teenagers in love.
92	28	"Graduation"	Peter Baldwin	Glen Merzer & Jonathan Schmock	May 23, 1994	090	17.6
Vinnie wants to announce his engagement to Blossom, but Blossom loses the ring. Joey is drafted by a professional baseball team.

=== Season 5 (1994–95) ===
No. overall	No. in season	Title	Directed by	Written by	Original release date	Prod. code	Viewers (millions)
93	1	"A New Life: Part 1"	Gil Junger	Judith D. Allison & Don Reo	September 26, 1994	092	16.3
Carol and Kennedy move in. Tony and Shelley move out. Joey goes on the road with the baseball team.
94	2	"A New Life: Part 2"	Gil Junger	Judith D. Allison & Don Reo	October 3, 1994	093	17.5
Blossom runs away to join Joey.
95	3	"Puppy Love"	Gil Junger	Allan Katz	October 10, 1994	094	14.4
Joey refuses to set Blossom up on a date with his teammate Richie (Philip Angelotti). Kennedy finds a lost bulldog. Shelley keeps picking on Tony.
96	4	"Your New Planet"	Gil Junger	Jonathan Schmock	October 17, 1994	095	16.2
Blossom makes a video for Tony and Shelly's unborn baby. Joey is given the rookie treatment.
97	5	"The Wedding"	Gil Junger	Judith D. Allison & Don Reo	October 24, 1994	098	17.1
Nick and Carol's wedding day arrives.
98	6	"Writing the Wrongs"	Ted Wass	Susan Seeger	October 31, 1994	097	14.1
Blossom struggles with a school assignment in which she can express herself in any way she chooses.
99	7	"Dirty Rotten Scoundrel"	Gil Junger	Dan Cohen & F.J. Pratt	November 7, 1994	096	16.8
Blossom babysits Kennedy and her friend. Joey is approached by a baseball groupie.
100	8	"The Game You Play Tomorrow"	Gil Junger	Jonathan Schmock	November 14, 1994	099	16.2
Blossom and Six are not accepted at the same college. Joey faces his first batting slump. Shelley is starting labor contractions.
101	9	"Blossom Gump"	Ted Wass	Allan Katz	November 21, 1994	101	15.2
Blossom gives advice to Madonna and Michael Jackson as Blossom Gump.
102	10	"Oh, Baby"	Ted Wass	Brenda Hampton	November 28, 1994	100	17.4
Blossom, Six and Joey try to get Shelley to the hospital. Tony is being held at gunpoint in his ambulance.
103	11	"Mating Rituals"	Ted Wass	Susan Seeger	January 9, 1995	104	16.7
Blossom sneaks off to a party.
104	12	"Hi Diddly Dee"	Gil Junger	Dan Cohen & F.J. Pratt	January 16, 1995	102	12.1
Blossom auditions for a famous stage director (Ian Abercrombie).
105	13	"A Kiss Is Just a Kiss"	Ted Wass	Allan Katz	January 23, 1995	105	15.4
Blossom tries to get time alone with her new boyfriend (Christopher Daniel Barnes in a different role from "The Frat Party").
106	14	"Who's Not on First"	Ted Wass	Brian Herskowitz	February 6, 1995	106	18.6
Nick hurts his back and Six tries to help him out. Joey fantasizes he is on Jeopardy! against Blossom and Albert Einstein. NOTE: In March 2021, Bialik was named an interim host, and in August 2021, primary host of Jeopardy! herself, hosting 207 episodes from May 2021 until June 2023 (10 episodes as a guest in season 37, 115 episodes in season 38 syndicated, nine episodes of an ABC college tournament in February 2022, 60 episodes in season 39 syndicated, and 13 episodes of an ABC celebrity tournament that season). Bialik was terminated during the 2023 Hollywood labor disputes.
107	15	"It Happened One Night"	Ted Wass	Dorie D'Amore	February 13, 1995	107	17.6
Blossom agrees to go out with the son of Nick's old friend (Charlie Heath). Joey and Six get trapped by a flash flood.
108	16	"A Mind with a Heart of Its Own"	Gil Junger	Dan Cohen & F.J. Pratt	February 20, 1995	108	16.1
Vinnie wants to transfer to UCLA because he misses Blossom. Joey's new girlfriend (Holly Fields) spoils him.
109	17	"The Date"	Allan Katz	Allan Katz	February 27, 1995	109	19.8
Blossom is assaulted by her date (James Marsden).
110	18	"The Departure"	Gil Junger	Judith D. Allison & Don Reo	March 6, 1995	103	15.4
Tony finally moves out of the house. He, Shelley and Nash move back east.
111	19	"A Star Is Bared"	Gil Junger	Brian Herskowitz	March 13, 1995	110	13.1
Blossom is asked to play the lead in a movie directed by Talia Shire, but she has to appear nude. Joey teaches people to clear their mind at his job.
112	20	"You Say Tomato"	Gil Junger	Dorie D'Amore	March 20, 1995	111	14.3
Blossom gets a grade lower than the one she thinks she deserves and refuses to accept it.
113	21	"So Many Milestones, So Little Time"	Ted Wass	Susan Seeger	May 22, 1995	112	10.8
114	22	"Goodbye"	Ted Wass	Judith D. Allison & Don Reo	May 22, 1995	113	12.1
Joey proposes to Melanie. Nick decides to sell the house. Carol discovers she is pregnant. Blossom gets her first real job. Blossom, Joey, and Six do not want possible buyers to buy the house.
