= Lenny (TV series) =

- Genre: Sitcom
- Created by: Don Reo
- Written by: Judith D. Allison; Josh Goldstein; Brenda Hampton; William C. Kenny; David Landsberg; Jonathan Prince; Don Reo; Bill Richman; Racelle Rosett Schaefer; J.J. Wall
- Directed by: Andy Cadiff; Terry Hughes
- Starring: Lenny Clarke; Lee Garlington; Peter Dobson; Alice Drummond; Jenna Von Oy; Alexis Caldwell; Eugene Roche
- Country of origin: United States
- Original language: English
- No. of seasons: 1
- No. of episodes: 17 (1 unaired pilot, 1 unaired ep.)

Production
- Executive producers: Don Reo; Tony Thomas; Paul Junger Witt
- Producers: Judith D. Allison; Gil Junger; Bill Richman; Racelle Rosett Schaefer
- Running time: 30 minutes
- Production companies: Impact Zone Productions; Witt/Thomas Productions; Touchstone Television

Original release
- Network: CBS
- Release: September 10, 1990 – March 9, 1991

Lenny is an American sitcom that originally aired on CBS from September 10, 1990, to March 9, 1991. The series, a starring vehicle conceived for comedian Lenny Clarke, was created by Don Reo and produced by Reo's Impact Zone Productions, Witt/Thomas Productions, and Touchstone Television.

== Synopsis ==
Lenny starred long-time Boston stand-up comedian Lenny Clarke as Lenny Callahan, a working-class Bostonian who held down two jobs, a daytime one as laborer for the local electric utility and an evening one as a doorman at a posh hotel. His wife, Shelley (Lee Garlington) was a full-time homemaker and the couple had three children (presumably the reason Lenny needed to keep two jobs). One of their daughters, Kelly, was played by Jenna von Oÿ. Daughter Tracy was played by Alexis Caldwell. Other characters included Lenny's brother Eddie (Peter Dobson), a get-rich-quick schemer, and their parents, Pat (Eugene Roche) and Mary (Alice Drummond).

Initially scheduled against two established programs, the Top 30 show The Wonder Years on ABC and the Top 20 hit Unsolved Mysteries on NBC, Lenny was a ratings failure and put on hiatus in October, as part of CBS' programming realignment that also involves the switch of The Flash, the delay of Sons and Daughters, and the cancellation of another sci-fi show E.A.R.T.H. Force, and the newsmagazine 48 Hours replaced the program. It was brought back in a new time slot in December, but cancelled permanently in March 1991.

== Cast ==
- Lenny Clarke as Lenny Callahan
- Lee Garlington as Shelly Callahan, Lenny's wife
- Peter Dobson as Eddie Callahan, Lenny's younger brother
- Jenna von Oÿ as Kelly Callahan, Lenny & Shelly's first daughter
- Alice Drummond as Mary Callahan, Lenny's mother
- Alexis Caldwell as Tracy Callahan, Lenny & Shelly's second daughter
- Eugene Roche as Pat Callahan, Lenny's father

== Episodes ==
No.	Title	Directed by	Written by	Original release date	Viewers (millions)
0	Unaired Pilot	Unknown	Unknown	Unaired	N/A
1	"Lenny"	Terry Hughes	Don Reo	September 10, 1990	18.2
2	"Three Men and Three Babies"	Andy Cadiff	Judith D. Allison	September 19, 1990	10.4
3	"Opportunity Knocks Out"	Andy Cadiff	David Landsberg	September 26, 1990	9.2
4	"The Loan Ranger"	Andy Cadiff	Bill Richmond	October 3, 1990	9.5
5	"Yes, Virginity, There is a God"	Andy Cadiff	Racelle Rosett Schaefer	December 15, 1990	10.8
6	"Career Day"	Andy Cadiff	Brenda Hampton & Bill Kenny	December 22, 1990	8.9
7	"New York Stories"	Andy Cadiff	Don Reo	December 29, 1990	7.3
8	"My Boyfriend's Black and There Gonna Be Trouble"	Andy Cadiff	Racelle Rosett Schaefer	January 5, 1991	10.1
9	"G.I. Joe"	Andy Cadiff	David Landsberg	January 12, 1991	9.5
10	"Lenny Get Your Gun"	Andy Cadiff	David Landsberg	January 26, 1991	8.9
11	"The Gas Man Cometh"	Andy Cadiff	Josh Goldstein & Jonathan Prince	February 2, 1991	9.5
12	"A Fine Romance"	Andy Cadiff	Bill Richmond	February 9, 1991	8.0
13	"Cold"	Patrick Maloney	J.J. Wall	February 16, 1991	9.8
14	"Family Matters"	Andy Cadiff	Don Reo	March 2, 1991	7.9
15	"It Ain't the Heat"	Andy Cadiff	Josh Goldstein & Jonathan Prince	March 9, 1991	6.3
16	"One of Our Hubbys is Missing"	Andy Cadiff	N/A	Unaired	N/A
