= Call Me Kat =

American television sitcom (2021–2023)

- Genre: Sitcom
- Based on: Miranda by Miranda Hart
- Developed by: Darlene Hunt
- Starring: Mayim Bialik; Swoosie Kurtz; Leslie Jordan; Kyla Pratt; Julian Gant; Cheyenne Jackson; Christopher Rivas
- Music by: Anna Waronker
- Opening theme: Call Me Kat Theme (season 1) "Me, Oh My!" performed by Theel featuring Brittany Pfantz (season 2–3)
- Country of origin: United States
- Original language: English
- No. of seasons: 3
- No. of episodes: 53

Production
- Executive producers: Darlene Hunt; Mayim Bialik; Jim Parsons; Todd Spiewak; Miranda Hart; Angie Stephenson; Beth McCarthy-Miller; Alissa Neubauer; Jim Patterson; Maria Ferrari; Warren Bell
- Producers: Eric Norsoph; Alison Mo Massey; Mackenzie Gabriel-Vaught; Kelly-Anne Lee; Adam Faberman; Howard Jordan, Jr.
- Cinematography: Patti Lee; Antar Abderrahman; Clifford Jones
- Editor: Pamela Marshall
- Camera setup: Multi-camera
- Running time: 21–22 minutes
- Production companies: Farm Kid (season 1); BBC Studios America; That's Wonderful Productions; Sad Clown Productions; Fox Entertainment; Warner Bros. Television

Original release
- Network: Fox
- Release: January 3, 2021 – May 4, 2023

Related
- Miranda

Call Me Kat is an American television sitcom that aired on Fox from January 3, 2021, to May 4, 2023. The series stars Mayim Bialik as Kat, and includes Cheyenne Jackson, Kyla Pratt, Julian Gant, and Swoosie Kurtz. Leslie Jordan was also featured until his death on October 24, 2022. The series is largely based on the British sitcom Miranda by Miranda Hart, and was developed by Darlene Hunt. In May 2023, the show was canceled after three seasons.

== Premise ==
Call Me Kat follows a 39-year-old woman named Kat, "who struggles every day against society and her mother to prove that you cannot have everything you want – and still be happy". After leaving her job as a professor at the University of Louisville, she spends the money her parents set aside for her wedding to open a cat café in Louisville.

== Cast ==
=== Main ===
- Mayim Bialik as Kat, a 39-year-old woman who runs a cat café in Louisville and struggles to find a balance between her fulfilling new career and her constant sense of loneliness. She frequently breaks the fourth wall in the series.
- Swoosie Kurtz as Sheila, Kat's overbearing mother who cannot understand why her daughter chooses to be single and constantly tries to get her to meet new men.
- Leslie Jordan as Phil (seasons 1–2), a gay man who works as the head baker at Kat's café. It was later revealed that he was actually named Philliam. As stated, his name was supposed to be William but his father was really drunk when he named him. After Jordan's death during production of season three, Phil was written out of the show by marrying Jalen and moving to Tahiti with him.
- Kyla Pratt as Randi, a waitress at the café who becomes Kat's business partner in the third season.
- Julian Gant as Carter, the owner of The Middle C, a piano bar next to Kat's café, and Randi's boyfriend.
- Cheyenne Jackson as Max, Kat's friend and later boyfriend who works at Carter's bar after returning home from years of traveling abroad.
- Christopher Rivas as Oscar (season 2; recurring season 1), a package delivery man and briefly Kat's fiancé.

=== Recurring ===
- Tim Bagley as Wyatt, a regular customer at Kat's café
- Lamorne Morris as Daniel (season 1), a customer at Kat's café who refuses to tip on social and political grounds and also had a relationship with Randi
- Vanessa Lachey as Tara Barnett (season 1), Kat's best friend since childhood who is married with three kids
- Schuyler Helford as Brigitte (season 1, guest season 3), Max's ex-girlfriend
- Andy Favreau as Nick (season 2), owner of a sandwich shop near Kat's café who becomes Kat's landlord
- Laura Bell Bundy as Nicole (season 2), Max's girlfriend
- John Griffin as Jalen/Queen Dicktoria (season 3), a drag performer and Phil's love interest
- Jack McBrayer as Gideon (season 3), an Amish baker that Kat hires to replace Phil
- Jay Linzy as Darren (season 3; guest season 2), Carter's cousin that ends up working at Carter's bar The Middle C
- Margie Mays as Zoey (season 3)
- David Anthony Higgins as Jeff (season 3)

=== Guests ===
- Chad Doreck as Kyle ("Gym")
- Joey Lawrence as himself ("Call Me Kerfuffled")
- Jenna von Oÿ as herself ("Call Me Kerfuffled")
- Michael Stoyanov as himself ("Call Me Kerfuffled")
- Robin Thicke as himself ("Call Me Flatch")
- Chelsea Holmes as Kelly Mallet ("Call Me Flatch")
- Sam Straley as Lloyd "Shrub" Mallet ("Call Me Flatch")
- Ted Wass as Harley, Kat's deceased father ("Call Me Shellfish", "Call Me Dame Booty Clench")
- Ken Jennings as himself ("Call Me Ken Jennings")
- Parker Young as Donor 457/Brian ("Call Me Donor Four-Five-Seven")
- Kevin Sussman as Zac ("Call Me Donor Four-Five-Seven", "Call Me Chrismukkah")
- George Takei as himself ("Call Me Chrismukkah")
- Vicki Lawrence as Lurlene 'Mama' Crumpler, Phil's mother who shows up at Kat's café to replace him as a baker while he is out of town ("Call Me Philliam")
- Dolly Parton as herself pre-recorded ("Call Me Philliam")
- Margaret Cho as Val, a snobby cat lover Kat competes against at the Pretty Kitty Cat show ("Call Me Pretty Kitty")
- Russell Dickerson as himself ("Call Me A Donut Wall")

== Episodes ==
=== Series overview ===
Season	Episodes	Originally released	
Season	Episodes	First released	Last released
1	13	January 3, 2021	March 25, 2021
2	18	January 9, 2022	May 5, 2022
3	22	September 29, 2022	May 4, 2023

=== Season 1 (2021) ===
No. overall	No. in season	Title	Directed by	Written by	Original release date	Prod. code	U.S. viewers (millions)
1	1	"Plus One"	Beth McCarthy-Miller	Story by : Miranda Hart; Teleplay by : Darlene Hunt	January 3, 2021	T12.16551	5.63
Kat Silver, a single, 39-year-old woman who recently quit her job as a college professor after her father died, uses the money that was supposed to be spent on her wedding to pursue her dream of opening a cat café. When her childhood friend Tara invites her to attend her renewal-of-vows ceremony, Kat is ecstatic to learn that she can bring a guest and chooses her friend and employee Phil. However, Tara insists that Kat only bring someone she is romantically involved with, and when Kat ignores her and brings Phil anyway, it damages their friendship. Kat patches things up, but then her mother angrily confronts her for calling Phil her boyfriend in front of her friends. Kat brushes her off, insisting that she does not need to be in love to be happy, without admitting that she does feel something is missing in her life. When Max, her old college friend, asks her out to dinner, Kat happily accepts his offer and then accidentally kicks him in the face.
2	2	"Double Date"	Anthony Rich	Darlene Hunt	January 7, 2021	T12.16552	3.30
Sheila sets Kat up with Brandon, who works as an announcer at Churchill Downs. Their date is set for the same night that Kat is performing at Carter's talent competition with Max; believing that Max is into her, Kat chooses to stand Brandon up only to realize her mistake when Max admits he still has feelings for his ex-girlfriend Brigitte. Kat visits Brandon to ask for a second chance, but then learns he is actually married and only wanted to meet with her for advice on starting his own business. Kat swears off ever letting her mother set her up again, but then immediately relents when Sheila arrives and offers to set her up with another man who drives a Zamboni for a living. Randi confronts a customer named Daniel for never tipping, for which he explains the complicated but passionate reasons for why he does not. He does, however, gift her an expensive roll of camera film and flirts with her at the café.
3	3	"Vacation"	Mark Cendrowski	David Holden	January 14, 2021	T12.16553	2.84
Kat wins a vacation for two to Puerto Rico in a radio contest, and offers to take Tara given that everyone else is busy. However, Tara has a last-minute emergency, and Kat tells her mother and friends that she is going on the trip alone; secretly, she books a room in a hotel right in Louisville. Unfortunately, Max and Carter visit the hotel to attend a whiskey convention, where Kat has been impersonating a whiskey aficionado for free food and gets drunk while doing a tasting. While running home for her mouth-guard, Kat overhears her mother lamenting how much she fears for her daughter's safety. Saddened, Kat goes out onto the hotel roof alone with Max and reveals her fear of traveling alone. She ends up briefly fantasizing about Max proposing to her.
4	4	"Therapy"	Richie Keen	Darlene Hunt	January 21, 2021	T12.16556	2.53
When Sheila temporarily moves in with Kat and quickly wears out her welcome, the two are convinced to attend couples' therapy in an attempt to sort out their differences. The therapy session goes poorly until Kat and Sheila have a breakthrough when they start discussing Kat's father's death. Sheila admits that she let her grief for her husband's death keep her from helping Kat with hers, and the two reconcile. Phil and Randi go across state lines to obtain marijuana-infused oil for Phil's nearly blind mother, but when Phil accidentally eats one of the sticky buns he made with the oil, he becomes incredibly high and Randi barely stops him from stripping naked in Carter's bar.
5	5	"Cake"	Anthony Rich	David Holden	January 28, 2021	T12.16557	2.48
Kat has a dream about kissing Max; when she reveals it to him, he kisses her for real. Phil is asked to bake a wedding cake for a man named Lane, but when Phil realizes that Lane is the man his ex Marty left him for, he refuses. Lane, mistakenly believing he was denied service on account of his sexuality, posts a review that leads to the café losing customers and facing the threat of a boycott. Phil is convinced to bake the cake when Kat reminds him that he is doing it for her, Randi, and everyone else who loves him. Kat learns that Max does not see her as a potential romantic partner, and when she confronts him about it, he explains that he chooses not to date her because he has had bad experiences with dating before and is afraid of losing her as a friend. Unbeknownst to her, he has also been dreaming of kissing her.
6	6	"Gym"	Victor Gonzalez	Laura Krafft	February 4, 2021	T12.16555	2.55
Kat has an interview for Louisville's annual "Twenty Under 40" list; thinking she will ace the interview, she joins a local gym to work on her body. Unfortunately, the interview goes poorly as her social awkwardness gives the interviewer a bad impression; after a failed attempt to make up for it, Kat becomes distraught. A talk with Max makes Kat realize that, even though she will not make the list, she does not need it to get the validation she has always wanted: everyone who comes to the café is already grateful and that is enough. Randi breaks up with Daniel when he starts discussing marriage, but they eventually reconnect after she starts missing him. Phil hosts a children's book reading at the café, but the book he was supposed to read is too offensive. Instead, he recounts his own life story of coming out to his father, which is much better received.
7	7	"Eggs"	Kelly Park	Kimberly Altamirano	February 11, 2021	T12.16558	2.05
A doctor tells Kat that, given her age, she has to make a decision about whether to freeze her eggs. Nervous about the possibility of having children of her own, Kat fakes being pregnant as an experiment and quickly reaps the benefits. When Kat's deception is revealed, Max advises her to freeze her eggs anyway and ensure that if she ever wants a family, she will have the option to do so. A misunderstanding between Phil and Carter reveals that Phil has been catfishing an elderly bachelor named Henry online; while he genuinely loves Henry, Phil lacks the confidence to be honest about who he really is. After Henry learns the truth, Phil meets him for a make-up date after the gang convinces him to be honest.
8	8	"All Nighter"	Jody Margolin Hahn	Adam Faberman	February 18, 2021	T12.16559	2.20
Kat and Phil force Randi to let them accompany her to a nightclub as a way of proving they are not too old to have fun. At the club, Kat meets a 29-year old man, Oscar, who happens to also be a Louisville alumnus. He and Kat agree to start going out so she can give him some "life spoilers". Phil gets the chance to ride a mechanical bull, and when he and Kat get stuck in an empty grave on their way home and Kat admits her fear of death (after her mother asked her to snap up an empty grave plot), Phil tells her that he is grateful to have met her at a point in his life when he wasn't certain he would get to do everything he wanted to do before dying. Randi is annoyed with Daniel for not being a jealous or controlling boyfriend, because she has never had a healthy relationship. Daniel tells her that he understands how she feels and asks her to move in with him.
9	9	"First Date"	Kelly Park	Molly Schreiber	February 25, 2021	T12.16560	2.19
Kat goes on her first date with Oscar, which goes well until she takes him home and tries to initiate sex. Unable to get thoughts of Max out of her head, she accidentally says his name and a confused Oscar leaves her apartment immediately. When Max visits Kat to make onion relish and they discuss her problem, Kat realizes that she needs to be better friends with Oscar first, much like her and Max, before moving too fast in their relationship, while unbeknownst to her, turning down Max's romantic advances in the process. On their next date, they agree to take things more slowly and get to know each other better. Randi buys a set of sneakers for Daniel for their six-month anniversary, only for Phil to convince her that giving him shoes is an omen that their relationship will not last. Randi gives Daniel a different gift, and to her horror, receives a pair of sneakers from him after he explains that giving shoes is an omen of good fortune.
10	10	"Business Council"	Victor Gonzalez	Amy Hubbs	March 4, 2021	T12.16554	1.97
Kat joins the board of directors for her neighborhood business council, which Carter puts her up to out of hope that she will get him approved to lengthen the hours for his bar. After hearing the arguments for and against Carter's proposal, Kat votes against it. Carter stops speaking to Kat and bans her from the bar, which she interprets as proof that he only wanted her on the council for his personal benefit. After a failed attempt to make it up to him with her father's old jukebox, Kat seems ready to give up on their friendship. At the last minute, however, she finds a loophole that allows Carter to open a back patio area, allowing him to make up his lost business. Meanwhile, Randi takes a nude photo of Phil for her photography class after confessing to him her fears about pursuing her true passion in art.
11	11	"Moving In"	Jody Margolin Hahn	Lauren Bridges	March 11, 2021	T12.16561	1.76
While helping Randi move into Daniel's house, Kat accidentally discovers a photo of Daniel's first wedding, which he never told Randi about. When Randi learns about it, she gets mad at Kat for snooping and for telling her mom and Phil before telling her. Kat and Randi make up and Randi breaks up with Daniel for good when he dismisses her concerns, which she finds disrespectful. Kat vows to honor the "girl code" and talk to Randi about issues involving her or problems she has with her first. Max starts tutoring Carter's son, CJ, cleverly using his background as a teacher to break through CJ's stubborn resistance. When Kat takes a risqué picture to send to Oscar, she accidentally sends it to Max instead, and he and CJ see the picture.
12	12	"Salsa"	Jude Weng	David Holden	March 18, 2021	T12.16562	2.32
Kat makes plans to go salsa dancing with Oscar. Since she does not know how to salsa dance and wants to impress Oscar, she convinces Max to teach her. Her dance lesson from Max makes her excited for her date with Oscar. Since she only wants her excitement towards Oscar to come from Oscar himself, she cancels further dance lessons from Max. Kat takes too many of Phil's mom's sleeping pills and ends up sleepwalking. While sleepwalking, she writes an embarrassing email to Max's ex-girlfriend, and does not remember writing it after she awakens. Because of this, his ex-girlfriend asks him not to contact her ever again. The episode ends with Max mad at Kat and Kat worrying about her friendship with Max.
13	13	"Cat-A-Versary"	Anthony Rich	Darlene Hunt	March 25, 2021	T12.16563	2.11
One of Kat's cats dies as the first anniversary of cafe's opening approaches. Oscar remarks that it is "just a cat" and not a person, which hurts Kat's feelings. Though initially mad at Kat for provoking his ex-girlfriend, when Max hears the news of the cat's death, he consoles Kat and forgives her. Randi and Carter misplace the cat's ashes, and only track them down as the anniversary party is about to begin. Since the ashes are a two-hour drive away, they give Kat a box of rice and tell her they are the ashes. Max and Kat get to talking and Max says that his relationship with his ex-girlfriend did not work out because they were not friends first. With Max being more sensitive about the cat's death than Oscar, Kat starts getting interested in Max again. Just after Kat discovers the box contains rice instead of ashes, Oscar arrives with the box that really has the cat's ashes. He had driven the long distance to retrieve them since they were important to Kat. After being touched by Oscar's actions, Kat feels conflicted between her feelings toward Oscar and her feelings toward Max.

=== Season 2 (2022) ===
No. overall	No. in season	Title	Directed by	Written by	Original release date	Prod. code	U.S. viewers (millions)
14	1	"Call Me Kerfuffled"	Anthony Rich	Alissa Neubauer & Sheldon Bull	January 9, 2022	T12.17051	4.96
In the aftermath of Max's confession, Kat is freaking out about having to choose between Max, her longtime love interest, and Oscar, her current boyfriend. After talking about it with Phil and Randi, Kat decides to take a day off to figure things out, leaving her employees to run the café by themselves and giving them a list of tasks to get done. Meanwhile, at her apartment, Kat asks her mother for some advice, resulting in an eye-opening question that leads Kat to confront Max about the timing of his confession. Back at the café, Phil and Randi enjoy some relaxation after Wyatt, a regular customer, volunteers to complete Kat's tasks. Right after, though, they find themselves looking for and then rescuing Houdini, one of the café's cats. After, finding out from Carter that Max quit his job at the bar, Kat goes back to his apartment to convince him to stay and get his job back. At the café, one of the customers (Joey Lawrence), accidentally tells Oscar about Max's confession to Kat. This episode reunites Mayim Bialik with her Blossom co-stars Joey Lawrence, Jenna von Oÿ, and Michael Stoyanov.
15	2	"Call Me By My Middle Name"	Anthony Rich	Britté Anchor & Spencer Taylor	January 13, 2022	T12.17052	1.58
16	3	"Call Me a Sporty Giant"	Anthony Rich	Jon Kinnally & Tracy Poust	January 20, 2022	T12.17053	1.68
17	4	"Call Me Forty"	Nikki Lorre	Adam Faberman & Chelsea Myers	January 27, 2022	T12.17054	1.53
On her 40th birthday, Kat meets Oscar's mom. Initially they get along well but later Oscar's mom tells Kat she doesn't want her to date him anymore. Oscar's mom feels that Kat is too old for Oscar and wants grandchildren. When Oscar finds out he confronts his mom and tells her he will continue dating Kat whether she likes it or not.
18	5	"Call Me Your Biggest Fan"	Jude Weng	Howard Jordan, Jr.	February 3, 2022	T12.17055	1.83
19	6	"Call Me Unfaithful"	James Widdoes	Sheldon Bull & Britté Anchor	February 10, 2022	T12.17056	1.74
20	7	"Call Me Cupcake"	Phill Lewis	Alissa Neubauer & Spencer Taylor	February 17, 2022	T12.17057	1.70
21	8	"Call Me Señor Don Gato"	Phill Lewis	Jon Kinnally & Tracy Poust	February 24, 2022	T12.17058	1.30
22	9	"Call Me Irresponsible"	Michele Azenzer Bear	Sheldon Bull & Chelsea Myers	March 3, 2022	T12.17059	1.29
23	10	"Call Me Katzilla"	Kelly Park	Britté Anchor & Adam Faberman	March 10, 2022	T12.17060	1.40
24	11	"Call Me the Bad Boy of Cheese"	James Widdoes	Eddie Gorodetsky & Britté Anchor	March 17, 2022	T12.17063	1.95
The café is visited by Nick, a rude person who recently opened a deli nearby. Kat arrives at his deli later to deliver a welcome basket and discovers he has been breaking several laws. Later she gets angry when he puts an advertising sign outside Kat's café. It is suggested that Kat could be angry with the owner of the deli because she is attracted to him, and she later has a romantic dream about him.
25	12	"Call Me a McCluckhead"	Kelly Park	Spencer Taylor & Chelsea Myers	March 24, 2022	T12.17061	1.92
Kat goes on a double date with her mom, who is dating the owner of a chicken restaurant. When Kat's mom tells stories from her past, it makes Kat feel like she doesn't know her mother. Randi and Max are now roommates and both find the other very irritating. Later Carter puts a giant shirt around the two of them and tells them they have to keep it on until they learn to get along. They eventually start bonding by discussing what they find irritating about Carter.
26	13	"Call Me a Kingbirdie"	Anthony Rich	Jon Kinnally & Tracy Poust	March 31, 2022	T12.17064	1.52
Phil and Oscar invite Kat to join their bowling team, which had been losing lately. When Kat joins the team, they end up with one of the highest scores in the league. However, Kat creates rules for the team, like no food. This makes Oscar and Phil feel that Kat is taking the fun out of the game. Oscar becomes uncomfortable with Kat's winning scores because he feels Kat excels at everything while he does not.
27	14	"Call Me Cupid"	Phill Lewis	Teleplay by : Alissa Neubauer & Adam Faberman; Story by : Eddie Gorodetsky & Jamie Laski	April 7, 2022	T12.17065	1.76
Max gets a new girlfriend and they write songs together at the Middle-C bar. Kat becomes jealous of Max's new girlfriend. Randi's neighbors have been frequently arguing so loud that she can hear what they say through the walls. She finds their fights entertaining so invites Phil and Sheila to listen. Carter is frustrated that Randi is spending so much time listening to the neighbor's fights so the two of them argue while Phil and Sheila enjoy listening. After Carter and Randi start getting physical, they kick Phil and Sheila out of the apartment. Kat kisses Max at the end of the episode.
28	15	"Call Me Tiny Boo-Boo"	Rebecca Ancheta Blum	Teleplay by : Sheldon Bull & Spencer Taylor; Story by : Jon Kinnally & Tracy Poust	April 14, 2022	T12.17066	1.46
After kissing Max, Kat talks to her friends and decides she should break up with Oscar. Oscar arrives and announces he has been promoted to a dispatcher and wants to celebrate with Kat. Kat decides to postpone breaking up until after the celebration. Max and Kat talk, and Max realized Kat kissed him because he was in a relationship, just like he became interested in Kat after she started dating Oscar. Meanwhile, Max accidentally hits his girlfriend in the nose so she has to be hospitalized. At the hospital, Max brings her some soup without realizing it has mushrooms in it, which she is allergic to. At the Middle-C next door to the café, Oscar sings to Kat and proposes marriage to her. Kat doesn't want to hurt Oscar so she accepts. When Kat and Oscar are alone outside, Kat tells Oscar she can't marry him. Oscar realizes that this is because of Max. Oscar gets upset and goes back into the Middle-C. When Max asks Oscar what is wrong, Oscar punches Max in the face.
29	16	"Call Me What the Kat Dragged In"	Anthony Rich	Teleplay by : Howard Jordan, Jr. & Chelsea Myers; Story by : Britté Anchor & Alexandra Melnick	April 21, 2022	T12.17062	1.68
Oscar and Kat give each other their stuff back after they break-up. Max gives Carter the key to his apartment he shares with Randi, who is annoyed by how often Carter visits. To get used to single life again, Kat goes out to dinner by herself. Nick, the owner of the deli near Kat's café, sees Kat at the restaurant and the two have dinner together. The two go back to Kat's place and sleep together, and Kat is embarrassed when the others learn about it. Kat tells Nick it was a mistake, and that she is not interested in being with him. Randi tells Carter he visits too much and asks for the key back. Carter feels his relationship with Randi is going too slow. Nick reveals he just bought the building where Kat's café and apartment are, making him Kat's new landlord. Randi gives Carter the key back but requests he not visit as often.
30	17	"Call Me Flatch"	Anthony Rich	Teleplay by : Adam Faberman & Howard Jordan, Jr. Story by : Alissa Neubauer & Spencer Taylor	April 28, 2022	T12.17067	1.46
Nick raises Kat's rent by 40% which she cannot afford. She asks for Carter's advice who suggests that she layoff Phil. Instead, Kat starts earning income by tutoring math students and renting her apartment, forcing her to move back in with her mother. Max shows up in Robin Thicke's dressing room and plays a song he wrote. Robin Thicke calls security to have Max escorted outside. Kat's tenants (Kelly and Shrub) leave the bathtub running and the excess water collapses the ceiling of the café below. With another expense, Kat lays off Phil, who gets mad and leaves. Max gets a call from Robin Thicke who wants to record his song. Nick stops by the café. When he complains about the food (caused by Kat having to lay off Phil), Kat yells at him then has difficulty breathing and standing. The episode ends with Kat being taken to the hospital. Note: This episode is a crossover with Welcome to Flatch.
31	18	"Call Me Shellfish"	Anthony Rich	Teleplay by : Alissa Neubauer & Eddie Gorodetsky; Story by : Jon Kinnally & Tracy Poust	May 5, 2022	T12.17068	1.67
After Kat recovers from her panic attack, she has a fundraiser at the Middle-C to raise money for the café. She makes enough to stay open for a few more months, but has another panic attack when she realizes she will need to come up with a way to make more money once it runs out. She has a dream where her late father (played by Ted Wass) tells her to do what makes her happy and isn't sure she is happy at the café. The next day, she announces she will close the café and travel to France. Then Randi and Phil offer to keep the café open while Kat is gone. Max gets an offer to play his music in Tennessee.

=== Season 3 (2022–23) ===
No. overall	No. in season	Title	Directed by	Written by	Original release date	Prod. code	U.S. viewers (millions)
32	1	"Call Me Ken Jennings"	Anthony Rich	Teleplay by : Maria Ferrari & Warren Bell; Story by : Britté Anchor & Jim Reynolds	September 29, 2022	T12.17751	1.20
Returning home from her summer vacation, Kat meets Ken Jennings on the plane. She is excited to return to her café only to find that Phil and Randi have made many changes: it is now a juice bar, there is a different set of regular customers, and there are no longer cats in the café. Carter is unhappy he doesn't get to see Randi very often now that she works long hours at the café. Kat brings cats to the café without telling Randi. Later Kat gets frustrated using the blender and announces the café is no longer a juice bar. Kat and Randi fight and Randi quits. Max helps Kat realize that Randi worked hard to make the café a financial success while Kat was away. She apologizes to Randi and asks her to run the café with her as a business partner.
33	2	"Call Me Skeeter Juice"	Anthony Rich	Teleplay by : Jim Patterson & Chelsea Myers; Story by : Maria Ferrari & Warren Bell	October 6, 2022	T12.17752	1.10
Sheila is driving with Kat in the passenger seat. When she gets pulled over, Kat learns that her mom's drivers license has expired. Kat argues with Sheila that she should not drive with an expired license and should have it renewed. Eventually, Sheila reveals that the reason she has not renewed her license is that she is losing her vision and cannot pass the eye test. Kat agrees to drive Sheila to places she needs to be. Max is excited that a song he wrote will be used in a commercial, until it appears on TV and turns out to be a commercial for dog food, and instead of the lyrics being sung, several dogs bark the tune. Initially dejected, Max ends up making a YouTube video about the commercial, showing he can poke fun at himself. Phil sells his mom's moonshine, which she calls "skeeter juice."
34	3	"Call Me Thor"	Anthony Rich	Teleplay by : Britté Anchor & Jim Reynolds; Story by : Deanna Morgan & Justin Mooney	October 13, 2022	T12.17753	1.12
Max is asked to watch his baby nephew, Thor, but it is Kat who has the baby for long stretches of time when Max is busy working on a song. Meanwhile, Randi learns that Carter has been lying to her about liking scary movies.
35	4	"Call Me Donor Four-Five-Seven"	Mark Cendrowski	Teleplay by : Warren Bell & Adam Faberman; Story by : Jim Patterson & Christian Honce	October 20, 2022	T12.17754	1.12
After spending time with Max's infant nephew, Kat decides she wants a baby. She reads about a sperm donor she considers perfect, but when she visits the sperm bank, she learns that they have used all his sperm. She tracks him down on the Internet and learns he teaches a kickboxing class. When Kat shows up to the class and reveals she knows he is a sperm donor, he makes Kat leave, feeling that she violated his privacy. Kat also gets banned from the sperm bank. Meanwhile, Max and Carter go to a bar where people play board games. After making fun of the Dungeons & Dragons players there, each goes back to play the game without telling the other.
36	5	"Call Me Uncle Dad"	Mark Cendrowski	Teleplay by : Britté Anchor & Jim Reynolds; Story by : Maria Ferrari & Chelsea Myers	October 27, 2022	T12.17755	1.44
Kat tries to find another sperm bank but is denied service due to stalking a donor at the first clinic she tried. Max volunteers to father Kat's child. Kat is initially excited but when she learns that Max dropped out of college, she declines to accept his sperm. Kat reconsiders this decision when she finds a gift bag that Max intended to give Kat that contained items for the baby. Carter hosts ladies night at the Middle-C, which makes Randi jealous despite the fact that it was Randi who suggested it. Phil takes an interest in a drag queen he meets at the Middle-C. Note: This episode is dedicated to the memory of Leslie Jordan.
37	6	"Call Me The Hot Chick Two"	Mark Cendrowski	Teleplay by : Warren Bell & Jim Reynolds; Story by : Adam Faberman & Alexandra Melnick	November 10, 2022	T12.17756	1.11
Kat and Max get intimate and start dating. Their first date is awkward. Later in Max's bedroom, Kat goes into the bathroom to change and falls in the toilet. Max leaves to get wine but he ends up talking to Carter for a while. When Kat sees what is taking Max so long, she thinks Max would rather talk to Carter than be intimate with her. Meanwhile, Carter tells Randi that men run faster than women, so Randi challenges him to a race. When Carter falls during the race, he accuses Randi of tripping him. Phil finds security footage which shows that Randi did not touch Carter during the race. Kat and Max are unsure if they should keep dating out of fear it could ruin their friendship. Max thinks they have something special and wants to see where their relationship can take them.
38	7	"Call Me Dame Booty Clench"	Mark Cendrowski	Teleplay by : Deanna Morgan & Justin Mooney; Story by : Jim Patterson & Maria Ferrari	November 17, 2022	T12.17757	1.14
Carter's insecurities have him whining again, but Randi says it is not a good look and sets him straight. Phil is exhausted from partying all night with Jalen, making him feel he'll never keep up with his younger companion. Kat is also exhausted by Sheila who, unable to drive due to her failing eyesight, calls her daughter at all hours of the day to run errands which costs Kat time with Max.
39	8	"Call Me Fancy Puffenstuff"	Ren Bell	Teleplay by : Maria Ferrari & Warren Bell; Story by : Jim Reynolds & Rachel Livingston	December 1, 2022	T12.17758	1.07
Kat throws a murder mystery-themed friendsgiving and insists her friends/guests dress in character and participate. When neither the mystery party nor the meal go well, the friends take to drinking, especially Max. Kat mentions that Max has been drinking a lot lately, but Max denies he has a problem. However, an incident in his vehicle later has Max thinking Kat may be right. Note: This is the final episode to include Leslie Jordan as Phil Krumpler.
40	9	"Call Me Chrismukkah"	Mark Cendrowski and Ren Bell	Teleplay by : Jim Patterson & Jim Reynolds; Story by : Maria Ferrari & Warren Bell	December 8, 2022	T12.17759	1.03
Carter is miffed at being left out of the city's Christmas pub crawl, especially after hearing that Zac's board game bar has been added for the first time and he cajoled George Takei into making an appearance. Carter manages to get added back to the pub crawl by proposing an ambitious idea that turns out to be costly. The silver lining is that Carter proposes to Randi after the crawl, and she accepts. Meanwhile, Kat becomes Max's shadow as she is worried about him drinking again, even accompanying him to his rock climbing gym until he tells her that he really needs the alone time to help him stay sober.
41	10	"Call Me Philliam"	Kelly Park	Teleplay by : Warren Bell & Jim Reynolds; Story by : Jim Patterson & Maria Ferrari	January 5, 2023	T12.17761	1.18
While Phil and Jalen vacation in Tahiti, Phil's mother Lurlene "Mama" Crumpler unexpectedly arrives to work in his place. Carter and Max go to the Crumpler farm to help out in her absence. They admire photos of Phil as a young man, and deliver a calf they name after him. Mama's baking is great, but she is aggressive and rude to the customers. Kat and Randi want to fire her but are too intimidated. Sheila volunteers to do it, and does so just after Lurlene has learned Phil is not returning to Kentucky; he and Jalen plan to marry in Tahiti and run a bakery there. Two weeks later, everyone has returned home from attending Phil and Jalen's wedding in Tahiti. They contemplate life without him. Note: The cast breaks the fourth wall, out-of-character, to acknowledge Leslie Jordan's death. A video tribute from Dolly Parton is followed by a montage of scenes featuring Phil, set to Jordan and Parton's duet, "Where the Soul Never Dies".
42	11	"Call Me Prescription Roulette"	Kelly Park	Teleplay by : Britté Anchor & Chelsea Myers; Story by : Deanna Morgan & Justin Mooney	January 12, 2023	T12.17760	1.20
43	12	"Call Me Ichabod Evel Knievel"	Michele Azenzer Bear	Teleplay by : Cody Wilkins & Benedict Chiu; Story by : Britté Anchor & Chelsea Myers	January 26, 2023	T12.17762	1.21
Kat hires a baker who is Amish and has never seen the world outside. She takes him to Costco where he is fascinated with the variety of items sold.
44	13	"Call Me Fatty Patty"	Anthony Rich	Teleplay by : Jim Patterson & Chelsea Myers; Story by : Maria Ferrari & Adam Faberman	February 2, 2023	T12.17763	1.03
Kat, Max, and others go on a camping trip to celebrate Max's birthday. They talk about moving in together but reconsider when they have a fight when Max used the ketchup packets Kat saved for a prank, and Kat wanted to use them on hamburgers. After they escape from a bear, they decide the fight was too trivial so decide to try to move in together.
45	14	"Call Me Better Than Paul Rudd"	Anthony Rich	Teleplay by : Britté Anchor & Adam Faberman; Story by : Chelsea Myers & Justin Mooney	February 16, 2023	T12.17764	1.56
46	15	"Call Me 'Cat's in The Cradle'"	Anthony Rich	Teleplay by : Maria Ferrari & Warren Bell; Story by : Deanna Morgan & Matthew McGeehan	February 23, 2023	T12.17765	1.31
47	16	"Call Me Worth the Wait"	Anthony Rich	Teleplay by : Jim Patterson & Jim Reynolds; Story by : Adam Faberman & Alexandra Melnick	March 2, 2023	T12.17766	1.18
Kat is excited when Max writes a song since it appears that the song is about her. When she hears more lyrics later, she believes that the song is instead about Max's ex-girlfriend, Brigitte. To show that she can be as spontaneous as Brigitte, Kat takes Max to sneak into a water tower to view the city from a great height. Meanwhile, Randi wants to be a cool step-mother to C.J. so lets him eat junk food and stay up late playing video games. She is conflicted about what to do when she catches him with booze in his backpack.
48	17	"Call Me Lady Avenger"	Phill Lewis	Teleplay by : Britté Anchor & Chelsea Myers; Story by : Warren Bell & Jim Reynolds	March 9, 2023	T12.17767	1.20
49	18	"Call Me Toilet Roboto"	Phill Lewis	Teleplay by : Deanna Morgan & Justin Mooney; Story by : Maria Ferrari & Rachel Livingston	March 16, 2023	T12.17768	1.29
50	19	"Call Me Not Okurrr"	Phill Lewis	Teleplay by : Warren Bell & Jim Reynolds; Story by : Jim Patterson & Maria Ferrari	March 30, 2023	T12.17769	1.09
51	20	"Call Me Consciously Uncoupled"	Phill Lewis	Teleplay by : Britté Anchor & Jim Reynolds; Story by : Chelsea Myers & Deanna Morgan	April 6, 2023	T12.17770	1.19
52	21	"Call Me Pretty Kitty"	Phill Lewis	Teleplay by : Jim Reynolds & Andy Gordon; Story by : Justin Mooney & Allison Jackson	April 27, 2023	T12.17771	0.99
53	22	"Call Me A Donut Wall"	Ren Bell	Teleplay by : Jim Patterson & Jim Reynolds & Andy Gordon; Story by : Jamie Rhonheimer & Jessica Kravitz & Justin Mooney	May 4, 2023	T12.17772	1.01

== Production ==
=== Development ===
On September 19, 2019, it was announced that Fox had given a series commitment, based on the British sitcom Miranda by Miranda Hart. The working title at this stage was Carla. The series was to be executive produced by Mayim Bialik and Darlene Hunt through Sad Clown Productions, Jim Parsons (Bialik's former co-star on The Big Bang Theory) and Todd Spiewak through That's Wonderful Productions, and Angie Stephenson and the original series creator and star Miranda Hart through BBC Studios. That's Wonderful Productions' Eric Norsoph, and Sad Clown Productions' Mackenzie Gabriel-Vaught would serve as producers. Production companies named were Fox Entertainment and Warner Bros. Television. On February 12, 2020, it was announced that the series title had been changed from Carla to Call Me Kat. On May 11, 2020, it was announced that Fox had ordered the pilot to series. The series premiered on January 3, 2021. On May 10, 2021, the show was renewed for a second season. On June 16, 2021, Alissa Neubauer joined the series as the showrunner for the second season to replace Hunt. On May 16, 2022, the show was renewed for a third season. On June 9, 2022, Jim Patterson and Maria Ferrari were announced as the new showrunners for the third season, replacing Neubauer. On May 5, 2023, the show was canceled after three seasons.

During the show's development, Hunt decided to set the show in Louisville, near her hometown of Lebanon Junction, Kentucky, telling Kirby Yates of Louisville's daily newspaper, The Courier-Journal, "Louisville just felt right." In the same interview, Hunt told Yates that Bialik approved of the setting: "She had been to Louisville recently and loved the city and told me she felt it was really unique and special. I gave her the option to set it in her hometown of San Diego, but she doubled down on Louisville." Hunt is not the only Louisville-area native involved in the series' production; a co-executive producer and writer, Amy Hubbs, is from Elizabethtown, Kentucky. Hunt noted that she and Hubbs had "a big debate" over Kat's allegiance in the Kentucky–Louisville college rivalry, noting that "I grew up a big U of L fan, and Amy was a huge UK fan." Hunt chose not to reveal Kat's allegiance before the series premiere, but confirmed that the chosen university sent several items to be used in decorating the character's home.

According to Yates, the series is "chock full of Louisville references", with the first three episodes alone making multiple references to Louisville cultural touchstones and locations such as the UK–U of L rivalry, bourbon, the Brown Hotel, Churchill Downs, and Muhammad Ali. Yates added, "Although none of the show is actually filmed in Louisville, the show's art department works off photographs to recreate the references in Louisville on a production stage in Los Angeles." Hunt further added, "It does feel really special to be able to make so many shoutouts to people, places and things around Louisville and to be able to honor them in the show. A new hometown pride is coming out in me, so it's very special."

Bialik confirmed that the show is filmed on a closed set without a studio audience due to COVID-19; a laugh track is added during post-production.

=== Casting ===
Upon series commitment, Bialik was also cast to star in the series. In February 2020, Swoosie Kurtz and Kyla Pratt had joined the cast in starring roles. On March 6, 2020, Cheyenne Jackson was cast in a starring role. On April 2, 2020, it was announced that Leslie Jordan joined the main cast. On April 28, 2020, it was reported that Julian Gant joined the cast as a series regular. In April 2022, it was reported Ted Wass and Bialik, who both starred in the sitcom Blossom as father-and-daughter, would reunite in the second season's finale, playing father-and-daughter.

Hunt added local color in casting of minor roles. She told Yates, "I cast one woman who mentioned she was from Louisville when she auditioned because her character works at a hotel, and I needed her to say 'Welcome to Louisville!' Anyone from Louisville knows how hard it is to get people from somewhere else to say that correctly!" The woman cast for that role grew up near Seneca Park in Louisville.

On October 24, 2022, Leslie Jordan was killed in a car crash, and it was announced that production on the series had paused indefinitely in the wake of his death. Jordan had completed work on eight episodes of season three prior to his death, but did not complete his work on the ninth episode. The October 27 episode "Call Me Uncle Dad" included a tribute to him.

=== Animal safety ===
In an interview, Bialik said the cats used in filming are neither drugged nor tethered. Several trainers are on-set to supervise the cats.

=== Filming ===
Call Me Kat was filmed at Warner Bros. Studios in Burbank, California, but it is set in Louisville, Kentucky.

== Broadcast ==
Call Me Kat premiered on January 3, 2021, at 8/7c on Fox. On January 7, 2021, the series moved to Thursdays at 9/8c, its regular Thursday timeslot, alongside Last Man Standing. It can also be seen on CTV in Canada. The second season premiered on January 9, 2022. The third season premiered on September 29, 2022. The series finale aired on May 4, 2023.

== Reception ==
=== Critical response ===
The first season has received mostly negative reviews from critics. On Rotten Tomatoes, it holds an approval rating of 27% based on 15 critic reviews, with an average rating of 5.1/10. The website's critical consensus reads, "More gimmick than sitcom, Call Me Kat buries a charming Mayim Bialik in a sandbox of toothless jokes and shallow characterizations." On Metacritic, season one has a weighted average score of 41 out of 100, based on 10 critics, indicating "mixed or average reviews".

=== Ratings ===
==== Overall ====
Viewership and ratings per season of Call Me Kat
Season	Timeslot (ET)	Episodes	First aired		Last aired		TV season
Season	Timeslot (ET)	Episodes	Date	Viewers (millions)	Date	Viewers (millions)	TV season
1	Thursday 9:00 p.m. (Note: The first episode of the first season aired on Sunday 8:00 pm, the eleventh episode of the first season aired on Thursday 9:15 pm, and the first episode of the second season aired on Sunday 8:00 pm.)	13	January 3, 2021	5.63	March 25, 2021	2.11	2020–21
2	Thursday 9:00 p.m.	18	January 9, 2022	4.96	May 5, 2022	1.67	2021–22
3	Thursday 9:30 p.m.	22	September 29, 2022	1.20	May 4, 2023	1.01	2022–23

==== Season 1 ====
Viewership and ratings per episode of Call Me Kat
No.	Title	Air date	Rating (18–49)	Viewers (millions)	DVR (18–49)	DVR viewers (millions)	Total (18–49)	Total viewers (millions)
1	"Plus One"	January 3, 2021	1.4	5.63	0.3	1.58	1.7	7.21
2	"Double Date"	January 7, 2021	0.7	3.30	0.4	1.87	1.1	5.17
3	"Vacation"	January 14, 2021	0.6	2.84	0.3	1.72	0.9	4.56
4	"Therapy"	January 21, 2021	0.6	2.53	0.3	1.37	0.9	3.91 (Note: Live+7 ratings were unavailable, so Live+3 ratings have been used instead.)
5	"Cake"	January 28, 2021	0.6	2.48	—N/a	—N/a	—N/a	—N/a
6	"Gym"	February 4, 2021	0.5	2.55	0.3	1.11	0.8	3.66
7	"Eggs"	February 11, 2021	0.5	2.05	0.3	1.41	0.8	3.46
8	"All Nighter"	February 18, 2021	0.5	2.20	0.4	1.55	0.9	3.75
9	"First Date"	February 25, 2021	0.5	2.19	0.3	1.50	0.8	3.69
10	"Business Council"	March 4, 2021	0.5	1.97	0.4	1.58	0.9	3.56
11	"Moving In"	March 11, 2021	0.4	1.76	0.4	1.42	0.8	3.19
12	"Salsa"	March 18, 2021	0.6	2.32	—N/a	—N/a	—N/a	—N/a
13	"Cat-A-Versary"	March 25, 2021	0.5	2.11	—N/a	—N/a	—N/a	—N/a

==== Season 2 ====
Viewership and ratings per episode of Call Me Kat
No.	Title	Air date	Rating (18–49)	Viewers (millions)	DVR (18–49)	DVR viewers (millions)	Total (18–49)	Total viewers (millions)
1	"Call Me Kerfuffled"	January 9, 2022	1.2	4.96	—N/a	—N/a	—N/a	—N/a
2	"Call Me By My Middle Name"	January 13, 2022	0.3	1.58	—N/a	—N/a	—N/a	—N/a
3	"Call Me a Sporty Giant"	January 20, 2022	0.3	1.68	0.2	0.97	0.5	2.65
4	"Call Me Forty"	January 27, 2022	0.3	1.53	0.2	1.04	0.5	2.56
5	"Call Me Your Biggest Fan"	February 3, 2022	0.3	1.83	—N/a	—N/a	—N/a	—N/a
6	"Call Me Unfaithful"	February 10, 2022	0.4	1.74	—N/a	—N/a	—N/a	—N/a
7	"Call Me Cupcake"	February 17, 2022	0.3	1.70	—N/a	—N/a	—N/a	—N/a
8	"Call Me Señor Don Gato"	February 24, 2022	0.3	1.30	0.2	0.95	0.4	2.25
9	"Call Me Irresponsible"	March 3, 2022	0.2	1.29	0.2	0.96	0.4	2.24
10	"Call Me Katzilla"	March 10, 2022	0.3	1.40	0.2	1.11	0.5	2.51
11	"Call Me the Bad Boy of Cheese"	March 17, 2022	0.4	1.95	0.2	1.15	0.6	3.10
12	"Call Me a McCluckhead"	March 24, 2022	0.3	1.92	0.2	1.15	0.5	3.07
13	"Call Me a Kingbirdie"	March 31, 2022	0.3	1.52	0.2	0.96	0.5	2.48
14	"Call Me Cupid"	April 7, 2022	0.3	1.76	0.2	1.02	0.5	2.78
15	"Call Me Tiny Boo-Boo"	April 14, 2022	0.3	1.46	0.2	1.05	0.5	2.51
16	"Call Me What the Kat Dragged In"	April 21, 2022	0.3	1.68	0.2	1.04	0.5	2.72
17	"Call Me Flatch"	April 28, 2022	0.3	1.46	—N/a	—N/a	—N/a	—N/a
18	"Call Me Shellfish"	May 5, 2022	0.4	1.67	—N/a	—N/a	—N/a	—N/a

==== Season 3 ====
Viewership and ratings per episode of Call Me Kat
No.	Title	Air date	Rating (18–49)	Viewers (millions)	DVR (18–49)	DVR viewers (millions)	Total (18–49)	Total viewers (millions)
1	"Call Me Ken Jennings"	September 29, 2022	0.2	1.20	0.2	1.12	0.4	2.33
2	"Call Me Skeeter Juice"	October 6, 2022	0.2	1.10	0.2	1.15	0.3	2.25
3	"Call Me Thor"	October 13, 2022	0.2	1.12	0.2	0.94	0.3	2.06
4	"Call Me Donor Four-Five-Seven"	October 20, 2022	0.2	1.12	0.2	1.04	0.3	2.16
5	"Call Me Uncle Dad"	October 27, 2022	0.3	1.44	0.2	1.04	0.5	2.48
6	"Call Me The Hot Chick Two"	November 10, 2022	0.2	1.11	0.1	0.98	0.4	2.09
7	"Call Me Dame Booty Clench"	November 17, 2022	0.2	1.14	0.2	0.98	0.4	2.12
8	"Call Me Fancy Puffenstuff"	December 1, 2022	0.2	1.07	0.1	0.89	0.4	1.96
9	"Call Me Chrismukkah"	December 8, 2022	0.2	1.03	0.1	0.80	0.3	1.84
10	"Call Me Philliam"	January 5, 2023	0.2	1.18	0.2	1.25	0.4	2.43
11	"Call Me Prescription Roulette"	January 12, 2023	0.2	1.20	0.2	1.18	0.4	2.38
12	"Call Me Ichabod Evel Knievel"	January 26, 2023	0.2	1.21	—N/a	—N/a	—N/a	—N/a
13	"Call Me Fatty Patty"	February 2, 2023	0.2	1.03	—N/a	—N/a	—N/a	—N/a
14	"Call Me Better Than Paul Rudd"	February 16, 2023	0.3	1.56	—N/a	—N/a	—N/a	—N/a
15	"Call Me 'Cat's in The Cradle"	February 23, 2023	0.2	1.31	—N/a	—N/a	—N/a	—N/a
16	"Call Me Worth the Wait"	March 2, 2023	0.2	1.18	—N/a	—N/a	—N/a	—N/a
17	"Call Me Lady Avenger"	March 9, 2023	0.2	1.20	—N/a	—N/a	—N/a	—N/a
18	"Call Me Toilet Roboto"	March 16, 2023	0.3	1.29	—N/a	—N/a	—N/a	—N/a
19	"Call Me Not Okurrr"	March 30, 2023	0.2	1.09	—N/a	—N/a	—N/a	—N/a
20	"Call Me Consciously Uncoupled"	April 6, 2023	0.3	1.19	—N/a	—N/a	—N/a	—N/a
21	"Call Me Pretty Kitty"	April 27, 2023	0.2	0.99	—N/a	—N/a	—N/a	—N/a
22	"Call Me A Donut Wall"	May 4, 2023	0.2	1.01	—N/a	—N/a	—N/a	—N/a

=== Accolades ===
The series was nominated for Outstanding Cinematography For A Multi-Camera Series at the 73rd Primetime Emmy Awards. and for Outstanding Multi-Camera Picture Editing for a Comedy Series at the 74th Primetime Emmy Awards
