= Jenna von Oÿ =

American actress (born 1977)

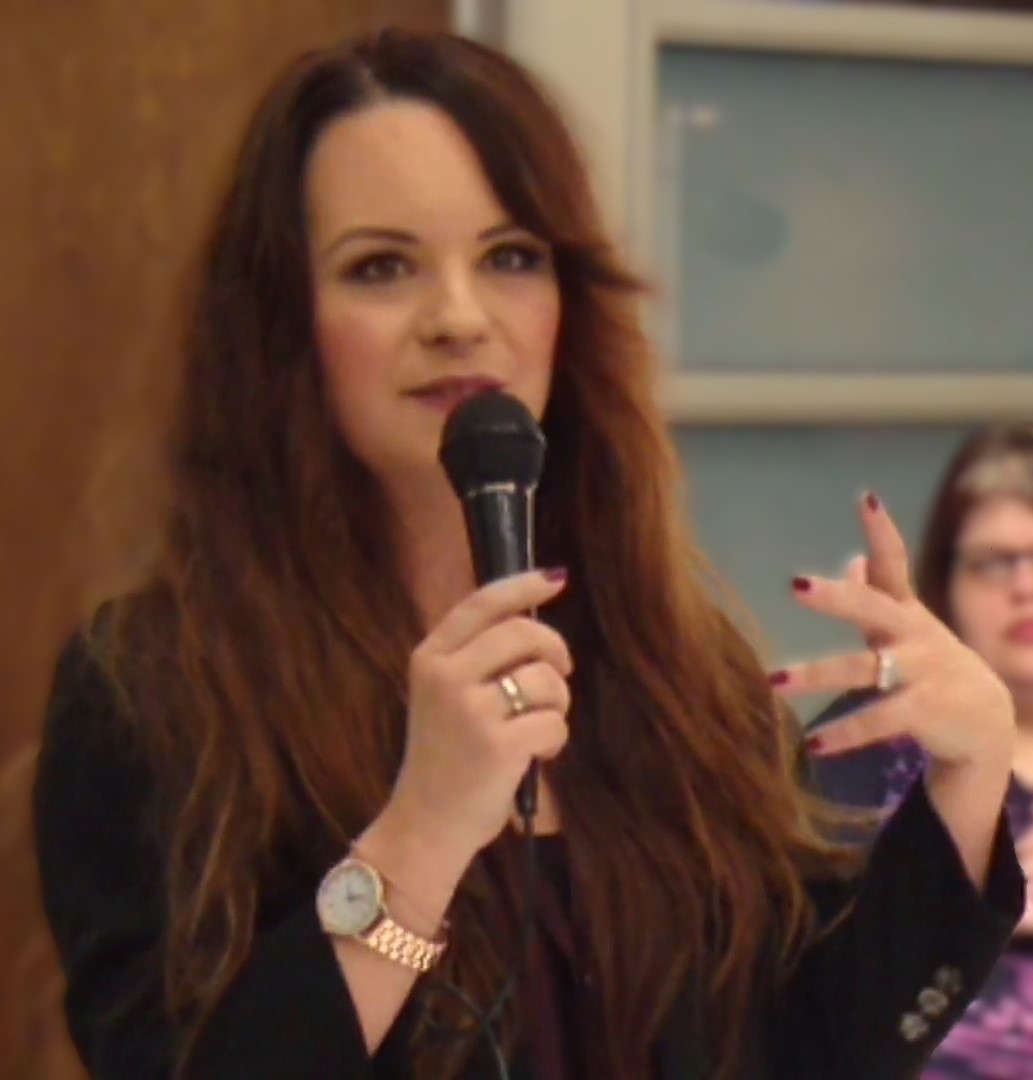
- von Oÿ in 2017
- Born: Jennifer Jean von Oÿ; May 2, 1977 (age 49); Danbury, Connecticut, U.S.
- Education: University of Southern California
- Occupations: Actress; singer; author
- Years active: 1986–present
- Spouse: Brad Bratcher (m. 2010; div. 2020)
- Children: 2

Jennifer Jean "Jenna" von Oÿ (born May 2, 1977) is an American actress and singer. She is best known for her roles as Six LeMuere in Blossom, Stevie Van Lowe in The Parkers, Stacey in A Goofy Movie, Trinket St. Blair in Pepper Ann and Jen Larkin in the first season of What's with Andy?

== Early life and career ==
Born in Danbury, Connecticut, to Gloria and Frank von Oy, Jenna attended Newtown High School and began her acting career as a child in regional stage productions and commercials. Von Oÿ made her television acting debut in 1986 in an episode of ABC Weekend Special, which was followed by guest roles on Tales from the Darkside and Kate & Allie. From 1990 to 1991, she co-starred in the short-lived CBS sitcom Lenny.

From 1990 to 1995, von Oÿ appeared in the role of the fast-talking Six LeMuere in the series Blossom. After the series ended, she attended film school at the University of Southern California and was an active member of the Kappa Alpha Theta sorority for two years before dropping out to return to acting. In 1999, she won the role of Stevie Van Lowe, Kim Parker (Countess Vaughn)'s sidekick in The Parkers.

During the run of The Parkers, von Oÿ also provided the voice of Trinket St. Blaire in the animated series Pepper Ann. After The Parkers ended its run in 2004, von Oÿ appeared in the 2005 television film, Marsha Potter Gets a Life. Later that year, she guest-starred in an episode of Cold Case and parodied Alexis Bledel's character Rory Gilmore in the Family Guy episode "Perfect Castaway".

In addition to television, von Oÿ has also appeared in the feature film Born on the Fourth of July (1989) opposite Tom Cruise. She has also provided the voices of Stacey in A Goofy Movie (1995) and Gracie in the direct-to-DVD feature Dr. Dolittle 3 (2006).

In June 2000, von Oÿ recorded a demo compact disc in an attempt to launch a recording career in country music. Her debut album, Breathing Room, was released on September 18, 2007.

== Personal life ==
She married computer-data consultant Brad Bratcher in Newtown, Connecticut, in October 2010 but the couple has since divorced. They have two daughters, born in 2012 and 2014. She publicly came out as gay in 2023.

== Discography ==
- Breathing Room (2007)
- Coffee & Men (An EP for Childish Adults) (2009)

== Filmography ==
Film and television
Year	Title	Role	Notes
1986	The Kingdom Chums: Little David's Adventure	Mary Ann	Television film
1986	Tales from the Darkside	Stefa	Episode: "Season of Belief"
1987	At Mother's Request	Ashley Schreuder	Television film
1987	Kate & Allie		Episode: "Dearly Beloved"
1989	Monsters	Amy	Episode: "Glim-Glim"
1989	Born on the Fourth of July	Young Suzanne Kovic	
1990–1991	Lenny	Kelly Callahan	16 episodes
1990–1995	Blossom	Six LeMuere	114 episodes
1993	Saved by the Bell: The College Years	Herself	Episode: "A Thanksgiving Story"
1995	A Goofy Movie	Stacey	Voice
1995	Family Values	Phoebe Huck	Pilot film (series not picked up)
1996	She Cried No	Jordan	Television film
1997	Dying to Belong	Shelby Blake	Television film
1997	Chicago Hope	Stacey Kagan	Episode: "White Trash"
1997	Unhappily Ever After	Bitsy Berg	Episode: "Little Miss Perfect"
1997	Martin	Donna	Episode: "Goin' For Mine"
1997–2000	Pepper Ann	Trinket	Voice, recurring role
1998	7th Heaven	Theresa	Episode: "...And a Nice Chianti"
1999	Moesha	Stevie Van Lowe	Episode: "It Takes Two"
1999–2004	The Parkers	Stevie Van Lowe	106 episodes
2000	An Extremely Goofy Movie	Co-ed	Voice
2001	What's with Andy?	Jennifer Larkin	Voice, main role (season 1)
2003	Truth Be Told	Kellie	
2005	Cold Case	Kitty 1982	Episode: "Schadenfreude"
2005	Family Guy	Rory	Voice, episode: "The Perfect Castaway"
2006	Dr. Dolittle 3	Gracie	Voice
2012	Lukewarm	Rose	
2017	Battle of the Network Stars	Herself	
2022	Call Me Kat	Herself	

== Awards and nominations ==
Year	Association	Category	Title of work	Result
1991	Young Artist Awards	Best Young Actress Starring in a New Television Series	Lenny	Nominated
1992	Young Artist Awards	Best Young Actress Co-starring in a Television Series	Blossom	Nominated
1993	Young Artist Awards	Best Young Actress Co-starring in a Television Series	Blossom	Won
1994	Young Artist Awards	Best Youth Comedienne	Blossom	Won
