= Space Station 76 =

- Teaser poster
- Directed by: Jack Plotnick
- Written by: Jack Plotnick; Jennifer Elise Cox; Sam Pancake; Kali Rocha; Mike Stoyanov
- Produced by: Dan Burks; Joel Michaely; Edward Parks; Rachel Ward; Frank Mele
- Starring: Patrick Wilson; Liv Tyler; Matt Bomer; Marisa Coughlan; Kylie Rogers; Kali Rocha; Jerry O'Connell; Keir Dullea
- Cinematography: Robert Brinkmann
- Edited by: Sharon Rutter
- Music by: Marc Fantini; Steffan Fantini
- Production companies: Rival Pictures; Destination Films; OM Films
- Distributed by: Sony Pictures Worldwide Acquisitions (international rights)
- Release dates: March 8, 2014 (SXSW); September 19, 2014
- Running time: 95 minutes
- Country: United States
- Language: English

Space Station 76 is a 2014 American parody science fiction film, directed by Jack Plotnick, and co-written by Plotnick, Jennifer Elise Cox, Sam Pancake, Kali Rocha, and Michael Stoyanov.

It is the first film directed by Plotnick. He developed the script through improvisation sessions at his home with some of his favorite actors. The film was released in select theaters on September 19, 2014 then through Video-On-Demand beginning September 30, 2014.

== Plot ==
Space Station 76 is a science fiction film that deconstructs seemingly idyllic relationships, set against the backdrop of Omega 76, a 1970s retro futuristic space station.

Jessica (Tyler) arrives to serve as the station's new co-pilot. While at first all seems normal and the crew friendly, she soon discovers that the people on board are struggling with issues such as infidelity, loneliness, depression, and drug abuse.

She becomes increasingly frustrated by Captain Glenn (Wilson), who harbors a secret of his own, namely his failed relationship with the previous co-pilot, Daniel. She is eventually drawn to Ted (Bomer), a lonely, married crewman, and his 7-year-old daughter, Sunshine (Rogers). Ted yearns to reconnect with his wife, Misty (Coughlan), but she's happier talking over her problems with Doctor Bot and having an affair with Steve (O'Connell). His daughter Sunshine contends with her unhappy, Valium-addicted mother and her pet gerbil eating its babies, one by one.

Events finally come to a head at a Christmas party, when Misty suggests they play the "Secrets Game". Jessica then exposes Glenn's same-sex attraction, just before Misty almost exposes Jessica's inability to have children. Just when it seems like everything's falling apart, an asteroid collides with the station, destroying the shuttle and leaving them all stranded.

As the crew slowly return to their lives, Sunshine turns off the gravity, and floats whilst viewing a meteor shower through the window.

== Cast ==
- Patrick Wilson as Captain Glenn Terry, whose struggle with his attraction to his own sex caused his breakup with Daniel, and then his alcoholism.
- Liv Tyler as Jessica Marlowe, the new co-pilot and replacement for Daniel, putting her at odds with Glenn, but she develops a close relationship with Sunshine and Ted.
- Matt Bomer as Ted, the mechanic, unhappily married to Misty, with a robotic right hand and an ambition to leave the ship.
- Marisa Coughlan as Misty, the ship's nutritionist and a narcissist who is threatened by Jessica's presence on the ship.
- Kylie Rogers as Sunshine, Ted's and Misty's daughter, who is sensitive and loves animals.
- Kali Rocha as Donna, Steve's cheerful yet selfish and materialistic wife who often neglects her newborn baby.
- Jerry O'Connell as Steve, a sex-crazed member of the crew, who is not only sleeping with Donna and Misty, but is also turned on by Jessica.
- Keir Dullea as Mr. Marlowe, Jessica's father.
- Victor Togunde as James
- Sam Pancake as Saul
- Michael Stoyanov as the voice of Dr. Bot, the on board, robotic psychologist, whose main method of treatment is prescribing Valium and other drugs.
- Katherine Ann McGregor as Janice
- Julia E. L. Wood as Susan
- Ryan Gaul as Chuck
- Matthew Morrison as Daniel, Glenn's former co-pilot and boyfriend who broke up with him for his being closeted.
- Anna Sophia Berglund as the Space Angel
- Melodi Hallenbeck as herself (stand-in for Kali Rocha, uncredited)
- Jack Plotnick (uncredited) as voice of Space Station 76

== Production ==
The film was a passion project for writer director Jack Plotnick who described making the film as "like climbing your own personal Mount Everest". With the film Plotnick wanted to tell the story of his own upbringing but do "it in a sort of an artistic way by setting it in the future as we had imagined it would be in the 70s". Plotnick chose the setting of a remote space station as he felt it was a good metaphor for the suburbs, while the retro future aesthetic represented the "perfect future we dreamed of but that never came to be".

Liv Tyler came aboard after participating in a Skype call with Plotnick which according to her "was half Skype session with a director and half therapy session for me". Tyler was also intrigued by Plotnick's work as an acting teacher and his personal philosophy regarding the craft.

The interior design of the space station bears an astonishing similarity to Keith Wilson's iconic designs for the interiors of Moonbase Alpha from Gerry Anderson's 1970s' hit series Space 1999, whilst there are many other visual references to classic 1970s films such as Silent Running and Star Wars.

=== Music ===
The film's soundtrack includes numerous 1960s and 1970s songs, including four by Todd Rundgren, stepfather of Liv Tyler: "International Feel", "I Saw The Light", "Hello It's Me", and "Utopia Theme".

== Release ==
Space Station 76 premiered on March 8, 2014, at the SXSW festival in Austin, Texas. before being given a limited release on September 19, 2014. The film was released via VOD and DVD on September 30, 2014.

=== Marketing ===
The first trailer was released on July 21, 2014.

== Reception ==
On Rotten Tomatoes, the film has an approval rating of 68% based on 25 reviews, with an average rating of 6/10. On Metacritic the film has a score of 49% based on 10 reviews.

Joe Leydon of Variety wrote: "Aiming more for bemused chuckles than for convulsive laughter, Plotnick and his actors deftly evoke a faux Me Decade ambiance throughout Space Station 76."

== See also ==
- List of films featuring space stations
