= Christopher Rivas =

American author, actor, podcaster, storyteller

- Born: 1986 or 1987 (age 37–38); New York City, U.S.
- Occupations: Author; actor; podcaster; storyteller
- Years active: 2009–present
- Known for: Brown Enough, Rubirosa, Call Me Kat
- Website: christopherrivas.com

Christopher Rivas (born 1986 or 1987) is an American author, actor, podcaster, and storyteller. He is best known for his podcast Rubirosa, his book Brown Enough, the role of Oscar on Call Me Kat, and his solo play, The Real James Bond... Was Dominican!

== Life and career ==
Rivas was born and raised in New York City in 1986 or 1987. The son of a Dominican father and Colombian mother. He attended California Institute of the Arts, where he majored in acting in 2011. He developed storytelling workshops United Nations High Commission for Refugees, LAMP on Skid Row, The Museum of Broken Relationships, UCLA and CalArts. In 2018, he was part of the faculty of The Ariane de Rothschild Fellowship.

== Filmography ==
Year	Title	Role	Notes
2009	If Not Now When	Basketballapostle	Short Film
2012	Public Law	Erubiel	Short Film
2014	Shameless	Eduardo	1 episode
2014	For Rent	Jason	Short Film
2014	Cry Wolf	Gerard	Short Film
2015	Rizzoli & Isles	Lamar St. John	1 episode
2015	2 Broke Girls	Mookie	1 episode
2015	Mi Casa Mi Casa	Ramone Cervantes	3 episodes
2016	Rosewood	Manny	1 episode
2016-2018	Couch Potato Chronicles	Sebastian Cruz	7 episodes
2017	Hollywood Girl: The Peg Entwistle Story	Messenger	Short Film
2017	Grey's Anatomy	Rodney	1 episode
2017	Two Sentence Horror Stories	Xavier	1 episode
2017	SEAL Team	Keith	1 episode
2017	Life After First Failure	Dirk	3 episodes
2018	NCIS: Los Angeles	ATF Special Agent Elliot Ross	1 episode
2018	For the People	Rodrigo Puente	1 episode
2018	GLOW	X-Ray Technician	1 episode
2018	9-1-1	Hector	1 episode
2018	Just Cause 4	Che Sanz	Video Game
2019	New Amsterdam	Ivan Velez	1 episode
2019	The Filth	Justin	2 episodes
2019	Adam Ruins Everything	Cool Beer Guy	1 episode
2021–2023	Call Me Kat	Oscar	Recurring role (season 1); main role (seasons 2–3)
2021	Call of Duty: Vanguard	Aviation Machinist Mate 3rd Class Mateo Hernandez	Pacific missions only
