= Portia Dawson =

American film and television actress

- Born: August 2, 1971 (age 55)
- Occupation: Actress
- Years active: 1991–2007

Portia Dawson (born August 2, 1971) is an American film and television actress. Her first role was in Vanilla Ice's movie, Cool as Ice. Her most notable television role was a recurring part on the 1990s sitcom Blossom as Anthony's girlfriend Rhonda Jo Applegate, but she has also had guest spots on shows such as Step By Step, Scrubs, Nip/Tuck, and Joey.

== Filmography ==
Film
Year	Title	Role	Notes
1991	Cool as Ice	Tracy	
1998	Beach Movie	Kimberlee	
1999	Dreamers	Patricia	
2002	New Suit	Lana	
2002	Kiss the Bride	Girlfriend #1	
2003	The Cooler	Waitress	Uncredited
2004	The Cure for a Diseased Life	Jane	Video short
2005	The Matador	Genevive	
2006	First Snow	Marci, Tavern Waitress	
2007	The Trouble with Romance	Rachel	

Television
Year	Title	Role	Notes
1991-1994	Blossom	Bambi / Rhonda Jo Applegate	44 episodes
1992	Freshman Dorm	Natasha	Episode 1: "Pilot"
1993	Sisters	Lucinda	Season 3 episode 7: "Something in Common
1994	A Friend to Die For	Lark Girl	TV movie
1995	Hercules: The Legendary Journeys	Jana	Season 1 episode 3: "The Road to Calydon"
1996	Brothely Love	Suzie	Season 2 episode 10: "The Great Indoors"
1997	Get to the Heart: The Barbara Mandrell Story	Louisa Mandrell	TV movie
1998	Step by Step	Monica	Season 7 episode 12: "Goin' to the Chapel"
2004	Scrubs	Mrs. Bell	Season 3 episode 18: "His Story II"
2004	Nip/Tuck	Kelly Appleton	Season 2 episode 1: "Erica Noughton"
2004	Joey	Tracy	Season 1 episode 12: "Joey and the Plot Twist"
2007	Eyes	Claire Thompson	Episode 12: "Karma"
