= Blossom (American TV series) =

American sitcom

- Genre: Sitcom
- Created by: Don Reo
- Starring: Mayim Bialik; Joey Lawrence; Michael Stoyanov; Jenna von Oÿ; David Lascher; Portia Dawson; Barnard Hughes; Finola Hughes; Courtney Chase; Ted Wass
- Theme music composer: Stephen Geyer; Mike Post
- Opening theme: "My Opinionation" performed by Dr. John (seasons 1–4)
- Composer: Frank Denson
- Country of origin: United States
- Original language: English
- No. of seasons: 5
- No. of episodes: 114 (list of episodes)

Production
- Executive producers: Don Reo; Paul Junger Witt; Tony Thomas; Gene Reynolds; David Amico; Judith D. Allison; Rob LaZebnik; Allan Katz
- Camera setup: Multi-camera
- Running time: 22–23 minutes
- Production companies: Impact Zone Productions; Witt/Thomas Productions; Touchstone Television

Original release
- Network: NBC
- Release: July 5, 1990 – May 22, 1995

Blossom is an American sitcom that aired for five seasons on NBC. Debuting as a pilot preview on July 5, 1990, it premiered as a mid-season replacement on January 3, 1991, and aired until May 22, 1995. Don Reo created the series, which starred Mayim Bialik as Blossom Russo, a teenager living with her father and two elder brothers. It was produced by Reo's Impact Zone Productions and Witt/Thomas Productions in association with Touchstone Television.

== Premise ==
Blossom Russo, an Italian-American teenager, lives with her single father Nick in a male-dominated household that includes elder brothers Tony and Joey. In the beginning of the series, it is revealed Blossom's family is adjusting in the wake of their mother Maddy leaving to pursue her own life and career. Nick is a session musician who is frequently between gigs and tours, Tony is a recovering alcoholic and drug addict who eventually goes on to become a paramedic, and middle sibling Joey is a stereotypical "dumb jock" known for the exaggerated delivery of his catchphrase, "Whoa!"

Blossom's best friend Six LeMeure also plays a significant part in her life. Six, an especially fast talker, is known for her tendency to ramble. Blossom would frequently have fantasy sequences wherein she would receive advice from celebrities such as Mr. T, Phylicia Rashad, David Spade, ALF, Will Smith, and God (played by Don Novello).

== Characters ==
=== Main ===
- Mayim Bialik as Blossom Ruby Russo, the youngest child and only daughter of Nick and Maddy Russo
- Joey Lawrence as Joseph "Joey" Russo, a not-so-smart baseball player, ladies' man and the middle child of the Russo family
- Michael Stoyanov as Anthony "Tony" Russo, the eldest Russo child who is a recovering drug addict and alcoholic
- Ted Wass as Nicholas "Nick" Russo, the father of Blossom, Joey and Tony. The main caregiver for his three children after his wife, Maddy, leaves the family. He works as a piano player, playing various gigs with a wide range of bands.
- Jenna von Oÿ as Six Dorothy LeMeure, Blossom's best friend
- Barnard Hughes as Frances "Buzz" Richman (season 2; recurring seasons 3–4), the maternal grandfather of Blossom, Joey, and Tony
- David Lascher as Vincent "Vinnie" Bonitardi (seasons 3–4; guest seasons 2 & 5), Blossom's on-again, off-again boyfriend
- Portia Dawson as Rhonda Jo Applegate (seasons 3–4), as Tony's former on-again, off-again girlfriend
- Samaria Graham as Shelly Lewis Russo, wife of Tony and mother of Nash. She is an illustrator who planned to marry her boyfriend Roscoe in Las Vegas when she got drunk and married Tony.
- Finola Hughes as Carol Russo (season 5; recurring season 4), an Englishwoman with a daughter named Kennedy; she eventually marries Nick and becomes stepmother to his three children
- Courtney Chase as Kennedy Russo (season 5), a young, precocious English girl about age eight who is Carol's daughter with her Scottish ex-husband, Graham
- Kevin Jamal Woods as Frank (season 5), African American neighbor boy who becomes Kennedy's best friend

=== Supporting ===
- Melissa Manchester as Madeline "Maddy" Richman Russo, ex-wife of Nick and mother of Blossom, Joey and Tony who split from the family to have her own life
- Gail Edwards as Sharon LeMeure, the mother of Six who is divorced and dated Nick at one time
- Eileen Brennan as Agnes, Blossom's neighbor/confidant who was seen during the show's first season
- Phyllis Diller as Mrs. Peterson, an elderly paramedic who is paired up with Tony
- Ivory Ocean as Carl Lewis, the father of Shelly Lewis, a police officer who once arrested Nick

== Production ==
=== Development ===
In 1988, series creator Don Reo had begun a producing partnership with Paul Junger Witt and Tony Thomas, in which the latter two were bringing his screenplays to television under the established Witt/Thomas Productions nameplate. Reo conceived of the idea that would become the genesis for Blossom when he attended a family party thrown by his longtime friend Dion DiMucci, lead singer of Dion and the Belmonts. At the party, DiMucci demonstrated a "hip, with-it musician father" family dynamic with his children, inspiring Reo to develop a pilot in which the "cool" father would be a highlight.

Reo was also inspired by J. D. Salinger's The Catcher in the Rye and wanted to create a series about a wise-beyond-his-years, introspective teenage boy modeled closely after protagonist Holden Caulfield. Reo decided to include both the hip father and Holden Caulfield-esque boy in the pilot, with the boy as the lead character. He first pitched the project to NBC in 1989 under the title Richie. NBC liked the screenplay, but network executive Leslie Lurie suggested that producers change the lead character to a girl "because of the overabundance of coming-of-age stories with boys." In the series finale episode, Reo and producer Judith D. Allison included a reference to the inspiration for Blossom's character when Blossom describes herself as a "teenage Holden Caulfield."

=== Casting ===
At the time Mayim Bialik filmed the pilot episode, she had recently worked on another sitcom project for Fox, entitled Molloy. The pilot episode of Blossom was taped in the spring of 1990 and was the first of the projects to air, with NBC broadcasting the pilot as a special on July 5, 1990. Four weeks later, Fox commenced a seven-episode tryout run for Molloy, whose episodes had been filmed earlier in 1989. Molloy was canceled for its low ratings, freeing Bialik to commit to Blossom whose ratings for the pilot special pleased NBC executives.

Natasha Lyonne vied for the role of Six, but the role eventually went to Jenna von Oÿ.

Bialik suggested Michael Stoyanov for the role of her brother after seeing him guest star on sister series Empty Nest. Bialik thought she and Stoyanov shared a strong physical resemblance and would be believable as brother and sister.

NBC ordered Blossom as a mid-season replacement for January 1991.

=== Pilot episode ===
NBC executives thought the depiction of an emotionally intuitive child paired alongside a super-chic father was too radical for its time; thus, Blossom has a more nuclear, conservative family dynamic in the pilot episode. Her father was named Terry Russo and was played by Richard Masur, while her mother Barbara Russo was played by Barrie Youngfellow. In the plot of the pilot, Blossom's parents are married but she suspected their marriage was in trouble.

The characters of Tony and Joey were also present in the pilot and played by the same actors from the regular series; however, Joey Lawrence's character was then named Donny. Neither of Blossom's parents had musical careers and instead worked in finance. Tony was going through his first drug/alcohol rehab period (in which Terry remarked that "he had a serious problem--he missed all of 1989") and had his own separate scene with Blossom in the kitchen as he gave her sage anecdotes about their lives.

The airing of the original pilot episode ranked number 3 for the week in the national Nielsen ratings. It was one spot ahead of a repeat of the pilot episode of Seinfeld. About two weeks after the pilot aired, NBC ordered more episodes of Blossom.

=== Series run ===
When NBC picked up Blossom as a regular series, Reo successfully convinced programming chief Brandon Tartikoff to allow the lead character to have the chic, divorced musician father he had originally envisioned for the project. Masur and Youngfellow's roles were recast, and Ted Wass, who had previously starred in Paul Junger Witt and Tony Thomas' 1970s sitcom Soap, was cast as Blossom's single dad Nick Russo. Witt and Thomas persuaded Wass, who was then considering leaving acting to become a director, to take the role on the condition he could also direct multiple episodes. Mayim Bialik had also enjoyed auditioning with Wass the most out of the other actors who were trying out for the role.

Five seasons of Blossom were produced, with a total of 114 episodes.

Bill Bixby became a frequent director on the series in its third season, a role he continued in for several episodes into the fourth, despite his ongoing battle with prostate cancer. On November 15, 1993, shortly after learning that his illness was terminal, Bixby collapsed on the Blossom set and was hospitalized. He died six days later.

=== Opening sequences ===
In the pilot episode, the song in the opening credits is Bobby Brown's 1988 hit single "My Prerogative", which plays as Blossom dances in her bedroom on home video. When the show went to series, the song “My Opinionation” performed by Dr. John was used as a replacement theme. The title sequence was re-shot so that Bialik's dancing was more in sync with the newer song.

The opening sequence for season two was changed to clips of dance moves by the title character on film and in front of a pastel blue/pink background. Blossom's outfit changed in each dancing scene and her dance moves ranged from belly dancing to voguing. Barnard Hughes was added to the main cast and opening credits under the "With" heading, preceding Ted Wass.

In the third season, the dancing concept was expanded upon and main cast members Lawrence, Stoyanov, von Oÿ and Wass joined Bialik one at a time as she danced. Portia Dawson and David Lascher's names were included, despite the actors not being physically present in the sequence. This version of the intro lasted through the end of season four. Also beginning in season three, many scenes of the show opened and closed with the first frame frozen in a multi-colored watercolor effect. The watercolor stills lasted through the end of the series.

The fifth and final season dropped a full-fledged intro, instead simply displaying the Blossom show logo over the watercolor effect to the opening notes of "My Opinionation". During the 1994–1995 season, NBC began running its credits in the squeeze-screen format; thus, cast and crew's credits were positioned at the beginning of each episode.

== Crossovers ==
Because Blossom aired immediately after The Fresh Prince of Bel-Air on NBC for a period, NBC cross-promoted the shows on two occasions. Will Smith appeared in the season 2 episode "I'm with the Band" as himself under his rap stage name The Fresh Prince, and later that season Karyn Parsons made an appearance on the show in "Wake Up Little Suzy" as her Fresh Prince character Hilary Banks. Estelle Getty appeared in one episode in season 1 as Sophia Petrillo, her character from The Golden Girls and Empty Nest.

== Episodes ==
Season	Episodes	Originally released		Rank	Rating	Viewers (millions)
Season	Episodes	First released	Last released	Rank	Rating	Viewers (millions)
1	14	July 5, 1990	April 29, 1991	46	12.1	19.0
2	24	September 16, 1991	May 4, 1992	33	12.9	20.4
3	26	August 10, 1992	May 17, 1993	27	13.5	21.0
4	28	September 24, 1993	May 23, 1994	32	12.2	18.5
5	22	September 26, 1994	May 22, 1995	55	10.4	15.6

== Reception ==
=== Critical reception ===
Though Blossom provided impressive ratings for NBC, early critical reviews were mixed. Ken Tucker of Entertainment Weekly felt the premise of the show was overdone, saying it is "yet another show about a nice, hapless single father (in this case, Ted Wass) coping with kids." Tucker praised Mayim Bialik and said the show is "raised to a higher level by [her] uncommon charm," but called the other characters bland, saying, "the male characters could exchange each other's lines and you wouldn’t notice — they're all the same generic nice-guy wiseacre."

Critic David Zurawik was amongst the few who praised the show and surmised that the lack of attention from other critics was due to many of them being "older, white men" who were more attuned to boys' coming-of-age stories. Zurawik opined that the dearth of female representation and female-driven stories on TV made Blossom an important show, and that by centering on a teenage girl, Blossom "is also telling adolescent girls that their concerns and feelings are as important as the concerns and feelings of adolescent boys." Zurawik added that in Beverly Hills, 90210, another popular show for teens, "the boys are the main characters, and the girls come up and either create the problem or tag along. The boys talk the most . . . and they are the ones who come up with the solutions." However, in Blossom, the female character is at the center and her "problems and concerns are what count. She finds her own solutions. Which is what makes Blossom such a rare show and an interesting case study of network television and our attitudes about what makes for a good TV show."

Zurawik also lauded the show for its humor and its inclusion of more serious issues, writing,

"Blossom does regularly deal with serious topics: Blossom's first period, using condoms, Blossom possibly running away...But some of the plots are as simple as Blossom and Six camping out overnight to get tickets to a C+C Music Factory concert, then meeting the group members and getting to dance with them — a nice half-hour of teen fantasy that ends on some high-energy, feel-good dancing. And let's not forget those 'fave' outfits Blossom creates or Blossom's own thoughts on what the show is all about."

By 1994, Variety said Blossom was "one of the more sharply written sitcoms of the past five years."

=== Awards ===
In 1993, Blossom received an Emmy Award nomination for Outstanding Individual Achievement in Lighting Direction for a comedy series, and was nominated for a Humanitas Prize for the episode "The Date", written and directed by season 5 executive producer Allan Katz. Bialik, Lawrence, and von Oÿ were all nominated for multiple Young Star Awards, with both Lawrence and von Oÿ winning in 1993 for Outstanding Young Comedian in a Television Series and Best Young Actress Co-starring in a Television Series, respectively.

=== Reruns ===
The show ran in off-network syndication from September 1995 to September 1999, which was carried concurrently on superstation WGN. The initial off-network run was inauspicious, and Bialik did not recall it in a 2020 interview. Hub Network / Discovery Family carried reruns of the series in the early 2010s.

In February 2026, a 24/7 free ad-supported streaming television channel devoted to reruns of the series was added to The Roku Channel.

== Cultural impact ==
Blossom was heralded for being one of the rare primetime TV shows at the time to center on a teenage girl, the other show being Clarissa Explains It All on Nickelodeon. It also received praise for addressing topics like family dysfunction, addiction, sex, single fatherhood, and depression. Blossom was the first family sitcom to feature a teenage character dealing with substance abuse recovery. In later seasons, the show increasingly tackled more mature issues, such as the dangers of sexual assault and gun violence.

In a retrospective article for Slate, Willa Paskin wrote that "Blossom, like any sitcom with teenagers, features lots of lessons learned, but most of those lessons skirt a cheesy Full House fate because they aren't overly simplistic", and that today, "it's still rare for sitcoms, even the good ones, to embrace ambiguity."

Mayim Bialik said in 2016, "What we tried to show was the full range of emotions that human beings can have, but in particular that young women can have. The images of women that most of us raised in the '70s and '80s, and even the '60s, saw of women wasn't always appropriately complicated. A lot of times it was the bimbo or the nerd, you were either pretty or you were ugly and that's sort of how characters were written. With Blossom we were trying to show someone who had ups and downs. Some days she felt good, some days she didn't. We did a great episode called 'Blue Blossom', which was about her being depressed and those were things we were trying to normalize."

Bialik added, "The character did not look like a runway model. She wore normal clothes. Some days we had flannel shirts and jeans days. And the actress playing her, me, was not a traditionally attractive female that people were used to seeing on TV, especially for lead women. The fact that it is so commonplace now… I don't know that we're uniquely responsible for that, but we definitely were the first network show I knew about at that time that was about a girl."

The outfits worn by Blossom and Six turned the characters into trend setters, popularizing flowered, floppy hats, baby-doll dresses, and sundresses. Costume designer Sherry Thompson and costume supervisor Marion Kirk culled the characters' eclectic wardrobes, which would average six outfits per episode, from Melrose Avenue boutiques and chain stores. In 1993, an official Blossom clothing line was released in department stores.

During the series' run and after, it was parodied or referenced in other shows like Saturday Night Live, The Simpsons, and Friends. The show was also referenced in a 2010 episode of Glee and on sitcom The Big Bang Theory, the latter which Bialik joined as a main cast member. In January 2022, the season 2 premiere of Call Me Kat, a Fox sitcom starring Bialik, featured a reunion of original Blossom actors von Oÿ, Lawrence, and Stoyanov. The trio portrayed themselves as actors from the sitcom, but did not refer to the titular character Blossom and only referenced the iconic hats and opening credit dance numbers.

On the January 14, 2025 episode of Night Court, lead character Judge Abby Stone, who is played by Mayim Bialik's former The Big Bang Theory co-star Melissa Rauch, boasts how she is an avid Blossom fan, even keeping the Blossom theme song on her cell phone as her "wedding precession," dancing to the Blossom theme song with Bialik and even preferring the character to Bialik's other known roles such as those in Call Me Kat and The Big Bang Theory; Stone even notes how she did not know about Bialik's The Big Bang Theory role. When first performing the Blossom dance with Stone, Bialik claims that Stone was the first person she can recall in recent times who asked her to do the Blossom dance with.

== Home media ==
On January 27, 2009, Shout! Factory (under license from rights-holders ABC and Walt Disney Studios Home Entertainment) released Seasons 1 & 2 of Blossom on DVD in Region 1. The 6-disc boxset includes all-new interviews with cast members, the original pilot episode, featurettes and audio commentaries.

Mill Creek Entertainment released a 10 episode best-of set entitled Blossom - 10 Very Special Episodes on October 12, 2010. The single disc release features episodes from the first 2 seasons.

DVD name	Ep #	Release date
Blossom: Seasons 1 & 2	38	January 27, 2009

For a period of time all five seasons of Blossom were available to stream on Hulu. In January 2019, the series was removed from the streaming service. On March 26, 2018, the whole series was made available on iTunes and Amazon Instant Video. In October 2023, the show was removed from Amazon Instant Video.

In March 2021, the series was again made available for streaming on Hulu. The series was removed from Hulu on March 8, 2024.

In Canada, the series is available on Disney+.

== Cancelled reboot ==
In May 2023, Bialik announced that a reunion series was in the works. The script for the pilot was complete and the entire cast was on board. On October 3, 2023, Bialik hinted that the reboot might not return as a sitcom.

Bialik told Vanity Fair, "We're hoping to reboot it not as a sitcom, though… we want to bring back these interesting, deep characters—a child of divorce, a recovering drug addict, an alcoholic—to see them in a whole new way."

On August 25, 2025, Bialik confirmed that the reboot would likely not proceed and that the "door is closed".

== See also ==
- Very special episode
