= Ted Wass =

American television director (born 1952)

- Born: Edward William Cantzler; October 27, 1952 (age 73); Lakewood, Ohio, U.S.
- Education: Art Institute of Chicago (BFA)
- Occupations: Actor; television director
- Years active: 1977–present
- Spouses: Janet Margolin (m. 1979; died 1993) Nina Feinberg (m. 1996)
- Children: 3

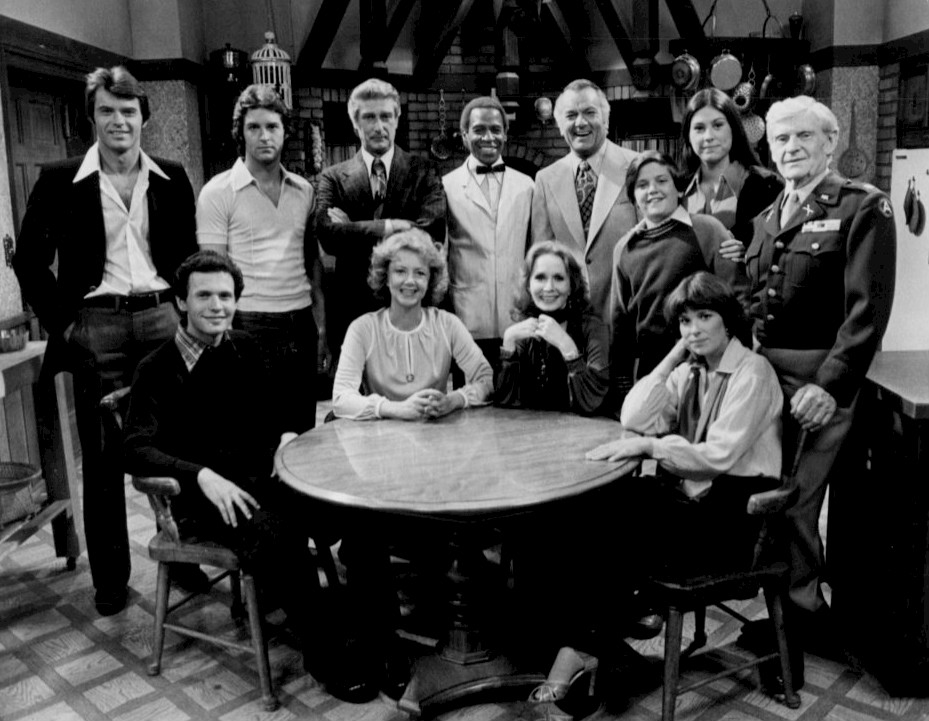
Cast of Soap (1977). Back row, L-R: Robert Urich, Ted Wass, Richard Mulligan, Robert Guillaume, Robert Mandan, Jimmy Baio, Diana Canova, Arthur Peterson Jr. Seated: Billy Crystal, Cathryn Damon, Katherine Helmond, Jennifer Salt.

Edward Wass (born October 27, 1952) is an American television director and former actor. He is best known for his roles as Danny Dallas on the series Soap (1977–1981) and as Nick Russo on the sitcom Blossom (1991–1995). After Blossom ended its run in 1995, Wass retired from acting and focused only on directing episodic television series, such as Spin City, The Big Bang Theory, Less than Perfect and 2 Broke Girls. Wass returned to acting when he reunited with Mayim Bialik and played her father again on Bialik's Call Me Kat in 2022.

== Early life and education ==
Wass was born in Lakewood, Ohio. He was raised in Glen Ellyn, Illinois and graduated from Glenbard West High School in 1970. He attended Goodman School of Drama at the School of the Art Institute of Chicago (now at DePaul University).

Wass trained as an opera singer and was also involved in rock and roll as a lead singer and guitarist.

== Career ==
=== Acting ===
In 1976, Wass made his Broadway debut in the original Broadway production of Grease, playing Danny Zuko.

He made his television debut as Danny Dallas on Soap from 1977 to 1981, filming 101 episodes. He appeared on Broadway with his Soap co-star Diana Canova in Neil Simon's They're Playing Our Song.

Wass starred in Curse of the Pink Panther (1983), one of the post-Peter Sellers films in the franchise, as Detective Sergeant Clifton Sleigh, engaged by Police Chief Dreyfus to track down Inspector Clouseau.

He played struggling musician Bobby Shelton (who trades his soul — and his family — to become an ill-fated rock star "Billy Wayne") in the black comedy film Oh, God! You Devil (1984). He played a sports journalist caught in a murder in female-Tarzan film Sheena (1984).

In 1986, he starred in the TV movie Triplecross, directed by David Greene. This was intended as a television pilot, but the series was never picked up.

His last acting role was among his most prominent, playing the title character's father in Blossom (1991–1995), a sitcom about a teenage girl with two brothers being brought up by their single father. He returned to acting in a similar role in Call Me Kat, which featured callbacks to three television series in which Kat (Mayim Bialik) had appeared.

=== Directing ===
Wass began directing while acting on the TV sitcom Blossom. He has directed episodes of over 40 TV series along with many TV movies.

== Personal life ==
Wass' first wife was actress Janet Margolin, who died in December 1993 at age 50 from ovarian cancer. Their two children are Julian (a composer) and Matilda. He has two grandchildren from Julian's marriage to director Jenee Lamarque. His second and current wife is producer Nina Feinberg Wass, whom he married in 1996. They have a daughter named Stella.

== Filmography ==
=== Director ===
| Year | Title | Notes |
|---|---|---|
| | Blossom | 18 episodes |
| | Local Heroes | |
| | Coach | 1 episode |
| | Mr. Rhodes | 6 episodes |
| | The Jeff Foxworthy Show | 13 episodes |
| | Jenny | 1 episode |
| | Smart Guy | 5 episodes |
| | Soul Man | |
| | The Secret Lives of Men | |
| | Costello | 1 episode |
| 1998–99 | Caroline in the City | 17 episodes |
| 1999 | Two of a Kind | 1 episode |
| | Oh, Grow Up | |
| | Norm | 1 episode |
| | Stark Raving Mad | |
| | Then Came You | |
| | Two Guys, a Girl and a Pizza Place | |
| | My Wife and Kids | |
| 2000–2002 | Spin City | 45 episodes |
| | My Adventures in Television | |
| | Regular Joe | |
| | Married to the Kellys | |
| | I'm with Her | |
| 2002–2006 | Less than Perfect | |
| 2006 | Crumbs | 10 episodes |
| 2006 | The Game | 2 episodes |
| 2006 | 'Til Death | |
| 2007–2013 | Rules of Engagement | 45 episodes |
| 2007 | The Big Bang Theory | 1 episode |
| 2007 | Two and a Half Men | 7 episodes |
| | Gary Unmarried | |
| 2007–2008 | Everybody Hates Chris | |
| 2009 | Scrubs | 1 episode |
| 2009 | Ruby & The Rockits | |
| 2009 | Brothers | |
| 2010 | Accidentally on Purpose | |
| | $#*! My Dad Says | |
| 2010 | Melissa & Joey | 9 episodes |
| 2011 | State of Georgia | 5 episodes |
| 2011–12 | 2 Broke Girls | 9 episodes |
| 2012 | Sullivan & Son | 3 episodes |
| 2013 | Dads | 2 episodes |
| 2014 | Undateable | 2 episodes |
| 2013–14 | Last Man Standing | |
| 2014–2015 | Mom | 16 episodes |
| 2015 | Cristela | |
| 2015 | Truth Be Told | |
| 2016 | The Odd Couple | 2 episodes |

=== Acting roles ===
| Year | Title | Role | Notes |
|---|---|---|---|
| 1977 | Family | Sam Trask | Episode "A Safe House" |
| 1977 | Handle with Care | Cpl. Tillingham | TV pilot |
| 1977–1981 | Soap | Danny Dallas | Main cast (77 episodes) |
| 1979 | The Thirteenth Day: The Story of Esther | Simon | TV special |
| 1987 | CBS Summer Playhouse | Mickey | Episode "Mickey and Nora" |
| 1989 | Men | Dr. Steven Ratajkowski | Main cast (6 episodes) |
| 1991–1995 | Blossom | Nick Russo | Main cast (113 episodes) |
| 2022 | Call Me Kat | Kat's father | Guest (2 episodes) |

TV movies

| Year | Title | Role |
|---|---|---|
| 1979 | The Triangle Factory Fire Scandal | Vinnie |
| 1982 | I Was a Mail Order Bride | Robert Fitzgerald |
| 1983 | Baby Sister | David Mitchell |
| 1985 | Sins of the Father | Gregory Scott Murchison |
| 1986 | Triplecross | Elliott Taffle |
| 1986 | The Canterville Ghost | Harry Canterville |
| 1986 | Sunday Drive | Paul Sheridan |
| 1988 | Shades of Love: Sunset Court | Dr. Jimmy Fielding |
| 1988 | Pancho Barnes | Frank Clake |
| 1990 | Sparks: The Price of Passion | Steve Warner |
| 1993 | Triumph Over Disaster: The Hurricane Andrew Story | Bryan Norcross |

Feature film

| Year | Title | Role |
|---|---|---|
| 1983 | Curse of the Pink Panther | Sgt. Clifton Sleigh |
| 1984 | Sheena | Vic Casey |
| 1984 | Oh, God! You Devil | Bobby Shelton |
| 1986 | The Longshot | Stump |
| 1989 | Fine Gold | Andre |
