= Michael Stoyanov =

American actor (born 1966)

- Born: Michael Edward Stoyanov; December 14, 1966 (age 59); Chicago, Illinois, U.S.
- Occupation: Actor
- Years active: 1985–present
- Known for: Tony Russo on Blossom
- Spouse: Carolyn Lawrence (m. 1988; div. 2005)

Michael Edward Stoyanov (born December 14, 1966) is an American actor and writer, best known as Tony Russo on Blossom (1991-1995)

== Biography ==
Stoyanov was born in Chicago, Illinois. He is of Bulgarian and Ukrainian descent. He is best known for his role in the situation comedy Blossom as eldest sibling Anthony "Tony" Russo. He left the show during the show's final season to write for Late Night with Conan O'Brien, a move he later said he regretted.

Stoyanov left Late Night within a year and went on to briefly write for Mad TV and Mr. Show. Stoyanov trained with the Chicago improvisational group The Second City. He also guest starred in the second season Quantum Leap episode "Another Mother", as Kevin Bruckner, an aspiring teenage comedian who is kidnapped. He had a cameo as "Dopey", one of the Joker's henchmen in the opening scene of the 2008 film The Dark Knight.

== Select filmography ==
- Big Shots (1987)
- Out on the Edge (1989) (TV)
- Gross Anatomy (1989)
- Married... with Children (1990) (TV) as Pizza Boy - episode – "You Gotta Know When to Hold 'Em:" Part 1
- Exile (1990) (TV)
- Quantum Leap (1991) (TV) as Kevin Bruckner - episode – "Another Mother"
- Blossom (1991-1995) as Anthony Russo, main cast
- Mom and Dad Save the World (1992)
- Without Warning: Terror in the Towers (1993) (TV)
- Freaked (1993)
- Late Night with Conan O'Brien (1994–1997), writer, 10 episodes
- Mr. Show with Bob and David (1997), writer, 5 episodes
- Beverly Hills 90210 (1996) – Jimmy Gold on episodes "Mate for Life" and "Disappearing Act".
- The Dana Carvey Show (1996) writer, full series
- Almost Forever (1996) (TV)
- Chicago Sons (1997) (TV series)
- Restaurant (1998)
- Mr. Show and the Incredible, Fantastical News Report (1998), writer, TV movie
- MADtv (1999–2000) (writer, season 5)
- Safe Harbor (1999) (TV series)
- Girls Will Be Girls (2003)
- Prison Break (2005) (TV series)
- The Dark Knight (2008)
- The Mentalist: Scarlet Fever (2009) (TV series)
- Justified (2013) (TV Series)
- Space Station 76 (2014)
- Gotham (2016) (TV Series)
- Kingdom (2016) (TV Series)
- Billions (2017-2020) (TV Series)
- Red Dead Redemption 2 (2018) (Videogame)
- Call Me Kat (2022) – Himself
