= Don Reo =

American television writer and producer (born 1946)

- Reo in 2026
- Born: Donald Louis Reo; January 28, 1946 (age 80); Rhode Island, U.S.
- Occupations: Film producer; screenwriter
- Years active: 1969–present

Don Reo is an American television writer and producer. He created or co-created numerous shows such as Blossom and The John Larroquette Show for NBC, My Wife and Kids and Rodney for ABC and The Ranch for Netflix.

Other shows for which he has written include Wizards and Warriors, Everybody Hates Chris, M*A*S*H, Rhoda and The Golden Girls. He was also the executive producer and the main writer for the FOX show Action. He created the FOX show Brothers and later was appointed an executive producer and showrunner on Two and a Half Men with Jim Patterson.

He is also known for co-writing the book Big Man with Clarence Clemons.
