= The Golden Palace =

American television sitcom

- Genre: Sitcom
- Created by: Susan Harris
- Starring: Betty White; Rue McClanahan; Estelle Getty; Don Cheadle; Cheech Marin; Billy L. Sullivan
- Theme music composer: Andrew Gold
- Opening theme: "Thank You for Being a Friend", performed by Chuck Negron
- Country of origin: United States
- Original language: English
- No. of seasons: 1
- No. of episodes: 24

Production
- Executive producers: Paul Junger Witt; Marc Sotkin; Tony Thomas; Susan Harris
- Producers: James Vallely; Nina Feinberg
- Camera setup: Multi-camera
- Running time: 22–24 minutes
- Production companies: Witt/Thomas/Harris Productions; Touchstone Television

Original release
- Network: CBS
- Release: September 18, 1992 – May 7, 1993

Related
- The Golden Girls

The Golden Palace is an American television sitcom produced as a sequel to The Golden Girls, a continuation without Bea Arthur (though she did guest star in a double episode) that aired on CBS from September 18, 1992, to May 7, 1993. It starred Betty White, Rue McClanahan, Estelle Getty, Cheech Marin, and Don Cheadle. Billy L. Sullivan also co-starred for the first half of its run. Less popular than its predecessor, the series aired for a single 24-episode season before its cancelation by CBS.

== Synopsis ==
The Golden Palace begins where The Golden Girls had ended, in the quartet's now-sold Miami house. With Dorothy Zbornak having married and left in the previous series finale, the three remaining housemates (Sophia Petrillo, Rose Nylund, and Blanche Devereaux) invest in The Golden Palace, a Miami hotel that is for sale. The hotel, however, is revealed to have been stripped of all of its personnel in an effort to appear more profitable, leaving only two employees: Roland Wilson, the hotel's manager; and Chuy Castillos, the hotel's chef. This requires the women to help perform the hotel duties.

The series focuses on the interactions between hotel staff and guests. Celebrity guest stars were frequent, and the series also featured the return of some recurring actors from The Golden Girls, such as Debra Engle as Rebecca Devereaux, Herb Edelman as Stan Zbornak and Harold Gould as Miles Webber. Bea Arthur reprised her role as Dorothy Zbornak for a two-part storyline in which she visits the hotel to check on her mother.

== Cast ==
- Betty White as Rose Nylund
- Rue McClanahan as Blanche Devereaux
- Estelle Getty as Sophia Petrillo
- Don Cheadle as Roland Wilson
- Cheech Marin as Chuy Castillos
- Billy L. Sullivan as Oliver Webb (episodes 1–6, 11 and 14)

== Episodes ==
No.	Title	Directed by	Written by	Original release date	Prod. code	U.S. viewers (millions)
1	"The Golden Palace"	Terry Hughes	Susan Harris	September 18, 1992	1001	18.5
Less than two months after Dorothy's departure, Blanche, Rose, and Sophia sell their Miami house and purchase The Golden Palace, a hotel in the city. The women meet hotel manager Roland, his foster child Oliver, and hotel chef Chuy Castillos. The women learn that the previous owners had fired much of the staff to make the hotel appear profitable, and the hotel has no money to hire new employees. Furthermore, the ladies have only one week to make the hotel's bank note payment, which is dependent on satisfying a group of travel agents booked for the hotel. Sophia and Rose are upset at Blanche for getting them into the situation, but Blanche convinces them that they can operate the hotel and make the business a success. Chuy wants to continue serving Mexican food at the hotel, while Sophia wants to start serving Italian food instead. Chuy quits in frustration, but later asks for his job back, and he and Sophia agree to work together. The women manage to get through the week after hosting the travel agents, making enough money to keep the hotel for another month and hire more staff. Guest stars: Tom LaGrua as the Thief, Stephen James Carver as Brad
2	"Promotional Considerations"	Lex Passaris	Jim Vallely	September 25, 1992	1002	16.7
Rose makes a deal with the producer of a talk show to have a guest on the program stay at the Golden Palace for free, in exchange for an ad acknowledging the hotel. However, they learn that the program will be focusing on murderers who are set free, which includes their new hotel guest, Gordon M. Cosay. Blanche, Rose, and the other hotel employees are nervous about having Cosay stay at the hotel, and they try to keep him happy, as he is easily upset and frequently yells. Roland eventually confronts Cosay and helps him realize that he appears weird to people, convincing him not to yell. When the program airs, the hotel employees are surprised to learn that Cosay is actually a psychiatrist, and they are upset when he recommends the Golden Palace as a quiet, stress-free place for former murderers to stay. Meanwhile, Roland and the other employees are upset that Blanche keeps trying to oversee all aspects of the hotel, and that she wants decisions to be approved by her. Blanche later realizes how much she needs Roland to help operate the hotel. Guest star: Bobcat Goldthwait as Gordon M. Cosay
3	"Miles, We Hardly Knew Ye"	Peter D. Beyt	Jamie Wooten & Marc Cherry	October 2, 1992	1006	16.7
While looking through the hotel guestbooks, Blanche discovers that Rose's boyfriend Miles Webber was a frequent guest at the Golden Palace until the ladies purchased it. As Miles has frequently been canceling his dates with Rose lately, Blanche concludes that he has been cheating on Rose. Later, Rose confronts Miles and ends their relationship before he can explain himself. However, Roland clarifies that the Miles Webber who frequented the hotel was a different man and not Rose's boyfriend, which causes tensions between Rose and Blanche. Miles and Rose reconcile, although he has recently fallen in love with another woman, a waitress named Fern. Not wanting to ruin Rose's friendship with Blanche, Miles decides to tell Rose about Fern, revealing that Blanche happened to be right about him. Although Miles still loves Rose too, she decides to break up with him, and later reconciles with Blanche. Meanwhile, Sophia discovers that Oliver has been charging guests who want to retrieve their missing items from the hotel's lost-and-found. Special guest star: Harold Gould as Miles
4	"One Old Lady to Go"	Lex Passaris	Jim Vallely	October 9, 1992	1005	15.6
Rose befriends a disoriented elderly woman named Vivian, who is lost and believes that Rose is her daughter Charlene. Rose lets Vivian stay at the Golden Palace, ignoring advice to contact the police. For the past six years, Rose has regretted putting her own mother in a retirement home, and she feels she can now make up for it by not letting Vivian wind up in a police shelter, as Vivian reminds Rose of her mother. Meanwhile, a new Chinese restaurant, also called the Golden Palace, has opened in Miami, causing confusion between the two businesses. Sophia takes advantage of this by accepting food orders from people who mistakenly contact the hotel. Chuy hires his friend, a woman named Dr. Fong, to help prepare the food, which is then delivered by Oliver. Roland discovers the scheme and forces the group to give their earnings to the real Golden Palace restaurant. Roland and Blanche also convince Rose to contact the police to help locate Vivian's family. When the police arrive at the hotel, they initially take Sophia by mistake, believing she is Vivian. Eventually, Vivian is reunited with her daughter, Charlene. Meanwhile, Roland is hesitant to have a talk with Oliver about sex. Guest star: Anne Haney as Vivian Co-stars: Margaret Cho as Fong, Michael Francis Clarke as Officer #1, Kelly Cinnante as Officer #2, Annie O'Donnell as Charlene
5	"Ebbtide for the Defense"	Peter D. Beyt	Marc Sotkin	October 16, 1992	1008	15.0
The hotel's insurance company declines to renew its policy following a mishap in which Rose covered the hotel pool while unaware that people were still in it. The hotel is hosting a convention of lawyers, and Rose has booked the remaining rooms for a group of judges from Jacksonville, Florida. Because Rose has accidentally overbooked the hotel, she, Blanche, and Sophia agree to share a room, while Roland, Chuy, and Oliver share another. They also convince one of the lawyers, Mr. Burrows, to share a room with one of the judges. However, the hotel employees realize that the Judges of Jacksonville are actually a biker group, and Burrows threatens legal action if anything should happen to him while staying with his roommate, a biker named Angel. Burrows later checks out of the hotel without any complaints. Meanwhile, the hotel hires a second chef named Rubin, the man who had sex with Chuy's now-estranged wife. Chuy and Rubin had been friends since childhood, and Chuy eventually forgives Rubin. Guest stars: Gregory Sierra as Rubin, Christopher Collins as Angel, Steve Hytner as Burrows
6	"Can't Stand Losing You"	Peter D. Beyt	Mitchell Hurwitz	October 23, 1992	1007	13.4
Rose believes that Roland is lonely and should have a girlfriend, and she convinces Blanche to compete with her in finding a woman for him. Rose finds a woman named Joanne, whom Roland likes. Blanche learns that Roland had an ex-girlfriend named Trisha and decides to have her fly to Miami to see him, thinking that Roland still likes Trisha. However, Blanche learns that Trisha is overly affectionate and obsessed with Roland, who had lied to Trisha about moving elsewhere to become a priest, in order to end their relationship. Roland eventually tells Trisha the truth that he is not in love with her, and she accepts it. Meanwhile, Sophia is upset that Chuy is chosen instead of her to go on a television program for a cooking segment. Guest stars: Kim Fields as Trisha, Monte Landis as Mr. Ricchuitti Co-star: Monica Allison as Joanne
7	"Seems Like Old Times (Part 1)"	Lex Passaris	Jamie Wooten & Marc Cherry	October 30, 1992	1009	13.5
Dorothy visits the Golden Palace for the first time and reunites with Blanche, Rose, and Sophia after four months. Dorothy is shocked at how hard Sophia is working at the hotel, although Sophia does not consider this to be an issue. Dorothy contacts her husband Lucas and decides that Sophia should come to live with them in Atlanta. She believes Blanche and Rose are overworking Sophia, who is left to choose between staying at the Golden Palace or moving to Atlanta with Dorothy. Unable to choose between her daughter and the two women she thinks of as daughters, Sophia takes her belongings and runs away from the hotel. Meanwhile, Chuy is initially excited to finalize his divorce with his wife after eight years of marriage. However, he feels lonely afterwards, so Roland encourages him to begin dating. During a drunken night, Chuy marries a woman named Beverly and buys her a new car. Chuy, wanting to make the marriage work, rejects his friends' concerns that he and Beverly barely know each other. Special guest star: Beatrice Arthur as Dorothy Guest stars: Bertila Damas as Beverly, Henry Polic II as Man #1
8	"Seems Like Old Times (Part 2)"	Lex Passaris	Jim Vallely	November 6, 1992	1010	15.7
Blanche, Rose, and Dorothy search for Sophia throughout Miami. They learn from a cab driver that Sophia asked to be dropped off at Shady Pines, the retirement home that she had despised. Upon arriving there, the ladies are surprised to see how nice Shady Pines has become after it was rebuilt following the fire. Despite the amenities, the ladies convince Sophia to return to the hotel, where she ultimately decides to stay rather than move with Dorothy to Atlanta. Sophia wants to remain active at the hotel, as she felt old when she was being cared for at Shady Pines. Dorothy accepts Sophia's decision. Meanwhile, Chuy is upset that Beverly will not have sex with him yet, and his work suffers as a result of his unhappiness. A man named Ramone visits the Golden Palace to congratulate Chuy on his marriage to Beverly, whom Ramone loves. Ramone vows to kill Chuy if he mistreats Beverly. Upon learning of this, Beverly realizes that Ramone loves her. Beverly tells Chuy that she only married him to make Ramone jealous, and that they were not really married, as their priest was actually a men's room attendant. Chuy is happy to have the relationship ended, as he realizes he does not love Beverly. Special guest star: Beatrice Arthur as Dorothy Guest stars: Bertila Damas as Beverly, Carol Leifer as Meredith, Miguel Sandoval as Ramone, and a then-unknown Jack Black as a taxi driver Note: This episode features the final appearance of Beatrice Arthur as Dorothy. This also marks the first and only appearance of Shady Pines, the nursing home frequently mentioned throughout The Golden Girls.
9	"Just a Gigolo"	Lex Passaris	Tony DeLia	November 13, 1992	1011	15.1
Blanche is attracted to a handsome man, Nick DeCarlo, who has been staying at the hotel. However, she loses interest when she learns he is a gigolo. When Nick is unable to pay his hotel bill, Blanche agrees to let him work it off in the kitchen with Chuy. Following the death of Blanche's blind date, she accepts Nick's offer to accompany her to a dance, despite his occupation. Blanche and Nick fall in love with each other, convincing him to end his line of work. After Nick works off his hotel bill, he decides to return to his hometown in Indiana, to work in his brother's hardware store. Blanche convinces him to stay at the hotel by financially supporting him, despite him saying he is uncomfortable with her doing so. Nick eventually decides to return to Indiana and work for his brother, then return to Blanche when he has saved up enough money to support her. Blanche agrees to write him a check to help him get settled in Indiana. However, Rose researches Nick and learns he is a con artist, as his hometown does not exist. She forces Nick to give the check back to Blanche, while not revealing that he was using her, so as not to upset her. Meanwhile, Vincent Vale holds a self-help seminar at the hotel. Chuy and Roland participate in the seminar, which includes walking over hot coals. Special guest star: Barry Bostwick as Nick DeCarlo Guest star: Phil Proctor as Vincent Vale
10	"Marriage on the Rocks, with a Twist"	Peter D. Beyt	Jamie Wooten & Marc Cherry	November 20, 1992	1012	16.1
Roland's parents, George and Louise Wilson, visit the hotel with the announcement that they are getting a divorce. Blanche tries to mediate problems between them, but is unsuccessful, as they have been unhappy with each other for the past 20 years. Roland accepts that his parents want to move on with their lives. Meanwhile, the hotel hosts local radio disc jockeys Bill and Milton for a comedy night. Sophia convinces them to pull one of their well known pranks during the event, with Rose as their target, telling them that she is stupid enough to believe the prank. During the event, Milton is locked in a tank of water, and Rose must answer Bill's various questions in order to have Milton released before he drowns. However, Rose is too late, and Milton is said to have drowned. When Milton comes to the hotel dressed as a ghost to scare Rose, she shoots him, to Sophia's horror. Rose and the other hotel employees then reveal to Sophia that she is the true target of the prank, as Milton is alive and well. The comedians believed that Sophia was deserving of a practical joke, as they considered her to be vindictive after she suggested the prank to them. Special guest stars: Tim Conway as Milton, Harvey Korman as Bill Guest stars: Bruce A. Young as George Wilson, Ja'Net DuBois as Louise Wilson
11	"Camp Town Races Aren't Nearly as Much Fun as They Used to Be"	Lex Passaris	Marc Sotkin	December 4, 1992	1004	13.2
Blanche has booked the hotel for a group of southern women known as Daughters of the Traditional South, although Roland, as a black man, objects to the group staying there as he believes they are bigoted toward black people. Roland further objects to a Confederate battle flag that Blanche has hung on the front desk to welcome the group. Roland views the flag as a symbol of prejudice toward black people, but Blanche tells him that the flag was her grandfather's and that it represents only good family memories for her growing up in the south. Roland decides to quit his job at the hotel over Blanche's refusal to remove the flag, although she eventually realizes that he was right about it, and that her memories are not as happy as she thought. They reconcile, and Roland stays at the hotel. Meanwhile, a couple checks into the hotel under the name of Mr. and Mrs. Smith, although Rose realizes the man used an alias and is cheating on his wife. Rose dislikes the idea of people staying at the hotel for infidelity, but Blanche and Roland tell her that it is not their job to judge the guests. Nevertheless, Rose repeatedly annoys the Smiths enough to check out of the hotel. Guest star: Charles Napier as Mr. Smith Co-star: Camille Ameen as Mrs. Smith Note: This episode received media attention in 2020, for its focus on racism and the Confederate battle flag. See Notable episodes in the Production section for more details.
12	"It's Beginning to Look a Lot (Less) Like Christmas"	Peter D. Beyt	Jonathan Schmock	December 18, 1992	1014	13.6
During Christmas time, the Golden Palace has booked a therapist, Dr. Norman Charles, and his seminar group of recently divorced patients who are traumatized by Christmas. Charles intends to help his patients get over their bad memories by having them stay in a Christmas-free environment, so Roland and the ladies reluctantly remove all Christmas decorations from the hotel to accommodate them. Chuy is pleased by this, as he has several bad Christmas memories. Later, Chuy has a dream in which the ladies appear to him as ghosts who teach him the joys of Christmas. Rose is the Ghost of Christmas Past, Blanche is the Ghost of Christmas Presents, and Sophia is the Ghost of Christmas Yet to Come. Upon waking up, Chuy realizes how much he loves Christmas, and he manages to convince Charles' patients that the holiday is not bad. Guest star: Nick Toth as Dr. Norman Charles
13	"Rose and Fern"	Peter D. Beyt	Marc Sotkin	January 8, 1993	1013	15.3
Miles keeps calling the hotel and leaving messages for Rose, leading her to believe he wants to get back together with her. Meanwhile, a woman named Fern decides to have her wedding at the hotel, and Rose agrees to help plan it. Rose and Fern bond while planning a cow-themed wedding, although Rose later learns that Fern is marrying Miles. At Rose's insistence, Miles and Fern still have their wedding at the hotel, as Rose wants to see Miles get married so she can have the closure necessary to move on with her life. Meanwhile, Roland and Blanche learn someone has been stealing money from the hotel. Rose, Sophia, and Chuy are interrogated, but Roland ultimately realizes that Blanche is the culprit. Roland tells Blanche that the hotel's revenue is not her personal money to spend, and that what she has been doing is considered embezzlement. Special guest star: Harold Gould as Miles Co-star: Nanette Fabray as Fern
14	"Runaways"	Lex Passaris	Mitchell Hurwitz	January 15, 1993	1003	14.4
Oliver wants to see a wrestling show, and Sophia wants to borrow a car to go downtown; they both are denied, leading them to steal a guest's car for a drive. Oliver's mother, Paula Webb, arrives at the hotel after getting out of rehab and is ready to take back her son. Roland tells her that Oliver is busy spending time with one of his foster grandmas. Oliver and Sophia are pulled over by a police officer for driving too slow; they are returned to the hotel, and Oliver goes home with Paula. Meanwhile, the Golden Palace is hosting a 16th birthday party for the daughter of a banker. Roland and Rose are eager to make the party a success, as the girl's father holds the bank note to the hotel. They are upset with Blanche for spending time with her boyfriend Ernie rather than helping to plan the party. Rose accuses Blanche of abandoning the hotel and believes she cannot handle the responsibility, but they later reconcile. Guest stars: Hansford Rowe as Mr. Siegel, Joely Fisher as Paula Webb Note: This episode features the final appearance of Billy L. Sullivan as Oliver Webb.
15	"Heartbreak Hotel"	Lex Passaris	Julie Thacker	January 29, 1993	1016	N/A
Taylor, a man who Blanche was attracted to in college, visits the Golden Palace. Taylor had previously chosen Blanche's college roommate over her, so Blanche tries to win him over when he visits the hotel, but he ends up falling for Rose. Blanche secretly sabotages one of their dates, allowing Blanche to take Rose's place with Taylor while Rose does hotel work. Rose learns Blanche sabotaged the date and eventually confronts her. Later, the women go on a date together with Taylor, who upsets Blanche by continuing to express his attraction to Rose. Blanche later realizes how many female friends she has lost due to her competitive behavior for men, and she and Rose reconcile. Meanwhile, a relationship expert known as The Love Doctor is holding a couples seminar at the hotel, and Sophia wants to participate, so she convinces Roland to accompany her. Later, she reveals that she wanted Roland to participate in the seminar so he could work out issues with his own love life. Guest star: Dick Van Patten as Taylor, Pamela Dunlap as The Love Doctor
16	"Señor Stinky Learns Absolutely Nothing About Life"	Peter D. Beyt	Marc Sotkin	February 5, 1993	1019	12.9
Roland, Brad the hotel pool maintenance man, and Chuy make up the members of a successful volleyball team. Roland, the team captain, wants to win a volleyball championship trophy. Chuy, who is a poor player, is upset about always being left out of the game by Roland. Rose later joins the volleyball team, and Roland agrees to let Chuy play as well. However, Rose and Chuy play poorly. Rose decides to become a volleyball cheerleader instead, and when Brad injures his ankle, Roland decides to put Chuy back in the game. However, Chuy loses the championship for the team, and Roland criticizes him for it. They later reconcile after Roland apologizes. Meanwhile, after Blanche meets with a bank employee and flirts with him, Rose and Roland make her realize that her behavior toward men could be considered sexual harassment, prompting her to try acting more professional with men. Lawrence Gentry, the owner of an adjacent hotel, complains that the Golden Palace parking lot occupies a portion of his hotel's parking lot. Blanche dresses in a business suit and tries to remain professional when meeting Gentry, despite their attraction to each other. They devise a solution by having the two hotels share the parking spaces, and they later decide to begin a relationship. Special guest star: Ricardo Montalbán as Lawrence Gentry Guest star: Stephen James Carver as Brad, the pool guy
17	"Say Goodbye, Rose"	Peter D. Beyt	Jim Vallely	February 12, 1993	1020	17.1
The Golden Palace is preparing to hold a stand-up comedy competition. Blanche's son, Matthew, visits the hotel with the announcement that he has temporarily quit his job as a stockbroker so he can try stand-up comedy. Matthew intends to participate in the hotel's comedy show, but Blanche does not want him to do so, as she believes he has made a mistake by quitting his job. She eventually decides to support Matthew's career choice. Meanwhile, Rose falls in love with Bill Douglas, a hotel guest who looks identical to her late husband Charlie. After dating for a while, Rose reveals to Bill why she initially became attracted to him, and he decides they should end their relationship, believing Rose only loves him for his appearance. Rose denies this, and she does not want him to end the relationship because she will feel like she has lost Charlie again. Because Charlie died suddenly, Rose did not have a chance to tell him goodbye. To placate her, Bill has Rose tell him goodbye as if he were Charlie. Sophia's friend, comedian George Burns, sings a song during the comedy night to cheer up Rose following the break-up. Guest stars: Eddie Albert as Bill Douglas, Bill Engvall as Matthew Devereaux Special appearance by: George Burns
18	"You've Lost That Livin' Feeling"	Peter D. Beyt	Marco Pennette	February 19, 1993	1018	14.0
The Golden Palace holds a grand reopening celebration to improve business. A local news team has been invited to the hotel to cover the event, and Rose has arranged for food critic Gerald Davenport to review the hotel's restaurant. Chuy despises Davenport for previously giving him a bad review. When Davenport is found dead, Chuy worries that he may have accidentally put rat poison in Davenport's meal. The news team arrives, and the body is hidden in the kitchen's walk-in freezer. When city health inspector Mr. Tucker arrives unexpectedly at the hotel, Blanche distracts him while Rose stuffs the body in a large suitcase to covertly transport it elsewhere. Rose abandons the suitcase in the lobby in order to distract the news team. Roland, unaware of the body's location, delivers the suitcase to hotel guest Mr. Mitchelson, who owns a chain of travel agencies. Later, Roland, Blanche, and Rose sneak into Mitchelson's hotel room and retrieve the body. However, they are forced to drop the body down a laundry chute when the news team approaches. Ultimately, Mitchelson and the news team see Davenport's body; the hotel employees pass him off as an unconscious drunk man and promote a new designated driver program for restaurant customers. Mitchelson recommends the hotel to his fellow travel agents, and the employees later learn that Davenport died of a massive coronary. Guest stars: Bill Morey as Mr. Mitchelson, Eric Christmas as Davenport, Stephen Root as Mr. Tucker
19	"The Chicken and the Egg"	Lex Passaris	Mitchell Hurwitz	March 5, 1993	1015	14.3
Blanche begins dating a cattle rancher named Bobby Lee, who wants to marry her and have children with her. Despite her age, he tells her about in vitro fertilisation, but the process would require an egg donor. Simultaneously, Blanche is visited by her daughter Rebecca in time for Blanche's birthday. Rebecca reluctantly agrees to be Blanche's egg donor, despite wanting her mother to act her age. Later, Blanche dreams that she, Rose, Sophia, Roland, and Chuy are pregnant. Upon waking up, Blanche realizes she cannot handle pregnancy and motherhood again. She meets with Bobby Lee to end the idea of having children, but before she can, he reveals that he has discovered himself to be impotent. Nevertheless, they agree to continue their relationship. Meanwhile, Sophia borrows Rose's car, but it and Sophia's purse later go missing. Sophia believes they have been stolen, so Roland teaches a self-defense class to Sophia and her elderly friends. Later, Roland and Rose learn that Sophia valet-parked the car, with her purse inside, at a hotel next door. Guest stars: Dick Gautier as Bobby Lee, Amzie Strickland as Sylvia, Debra Engle as Rebecca
20	"A New Leash on Life"	Lex Passaris	Marco Pennette	April 2, 1993	1022	13.7
Blanche begins dating a travelling greyhound dog trainer named Charlie Sardisco, who is staying at the hotel, and Rose bonds with his greyhound. When Sophia's friend Gladys breaks her hip, she gives Sophia her ticket to be a potential guest on The Price Is Right. Sophia needs money for a plane ticket to reach the show's studio in California, and after talking with Charlie, she decides to bet on dog races. Later, Rose is upset to learn that Charlie will euthanize his dog if it loses its next race. Rose steals the dog and tells Blanche that 50,000 greyhounds are euthanized every year for failing to win. Horrified by this, Blanche ends her relationship with Charlie, while Sophia ends her sports betting. Charlie takes the dog back but later agrees to let Rose adopt it out after it loses its race. Sophia skips her trip because of lack of money, and she is upset when she hears her name being called during a broadcast of The Price Is Right. Meanwhile, Roland's mother Louise begins spending time with Chuy, giving Roland the uncomfortable impression that they are dating. Roland is relieved when Louise reveals that she and Chuy have been attending classes for divorcees together. Guest stars: Ken Kercheval as Charlie Sardisco, Ja'Net DuBois as Louise Wilson
21	"Pros and Concierge"	Lex Passaris	Kevin Rooney	April 9, 1993	1024	12.2
Roland confides in Chuy that a more successful hotel offered him a job, which he turned down out of loyalty to the Golden Palace. Chuy tries to convince Roland to use the job offer to leverage a raise out of Blanche, but when Roland refuses, Chuy begins to drop hints to Blanche on Roland's behalf. Blanche is unable to give Roland a raise, but wanting what is best for him, she fires him, believing this will force him to take the better job. This leaves Roland unemployed and forced to take a humiliating job renting bicycles at the airport, while the Golden Palace staff struggle to contain the chaos without him. Eventually Blanche rehires Roland and manages to cut enough corners to give him a small raise. Meanwhile as a cash-saving method, Blanche gives Sophia a "vacation" that she chooses to spend at the hotel.
22	"Tad"	Peter D. Beyt	Marc Cherry & Jamie Wooten	April 16, 1993	1023	12.2
Blanche's mysterious yearly trips to Chattanooga, Tennessee have the staff guessing that there's a special man in her life, until her mentally disabled brother Tad shows up unexpectedly at the hotel, having taxied from his institution in Tennessee. Rose and Sophia are shocked that Blanche never mentioned her second brother after all these years. The staff goes out of their way to be kind to Tad, with Rose forming an especially close bond that causes Tad to declare he is in love with her. Blanche, upset, plans to send Tad back to his institution, until Rose confronts her and accuses Blanche of being ashamed of Tad. Blanche is forced to admit that she has felt ashamed of Tad all these years, but watching Rose's tenderness toward him makes Blanche decide that she wants to be more involved in Tad's life, inviting him back to the hotel for more visits in the future. Guest star: Ned Beatty as Tad Hollingsworth
23	"One Angry Stan"	Lex Passaris	Michael Davidoff & Bill Rosenthal	April 30, 1993	1021	9.7
Blanche and Rose are stunned to learn that Stanley Zbornak, Dorothy's ex-husband and Sophia's former son-in-law, is dead. The three women try to work through their complicated feelings toward the man. However, Stan secretly approaches Sophia and admits that he faked his death to avoid prison for tax evasion and plans to flee the country. Sophia tells this to Blanche and Rose, who assume Sophia is in denial. After Stan's funeral, he secretly visits Sophia a final time, with both admitting that in spite of their difficulties, they loved one another. His exit leaves Sophia in tears, while Blanche and Rose assume she has finally accepted his death. Meanwhile, Roland and Chuy are excited to plan a bachelor party booked at the Golden Palace and scheme to hire an exotic dancer. The two men learn at the last minute that the bachelor party was really a bachelorette party, forcing Roland to provide the entertainment. Special guest star: Herbert Edelman as Stan Guest stars: Earl Boen as The Priest, Abraham Alvarez as Herb Jenkins
24	"Sex, Lies and Tortillas"	Lex Passaris	Michael Davidoff & Bill Rosenthal	May 7, 1993	1017	8.9
During Spring Break, the Golden Palace is overrun by vacationing college students. Roland must go to extraordinary lengths to prevent the wily students from sneaking in unauthorized guests. Among the students is Rose's granddaughter Charlene, who confides to Rose that she intends to give her virginity to her boyfriend at the hotel. Seeing Charlene's uncertainty, Rose persuades Charlene to hold off on sex until she feels ready. Rose's advice is borne out when Charlene's boyfriend dumps her for refusing him. An unexpected tropical storm leaves the rambunctious college students trapped in the hotel until Chuy organizes their help in building the world's longest burrito in order to get into the Guinness Book of World Records. The group effort is successful but not official, as no record auditor can verify the burrito's size before it falls apart. Guest stars: Brooke Theiss as Charlene, Adam Biesk as Benson

== Production ==
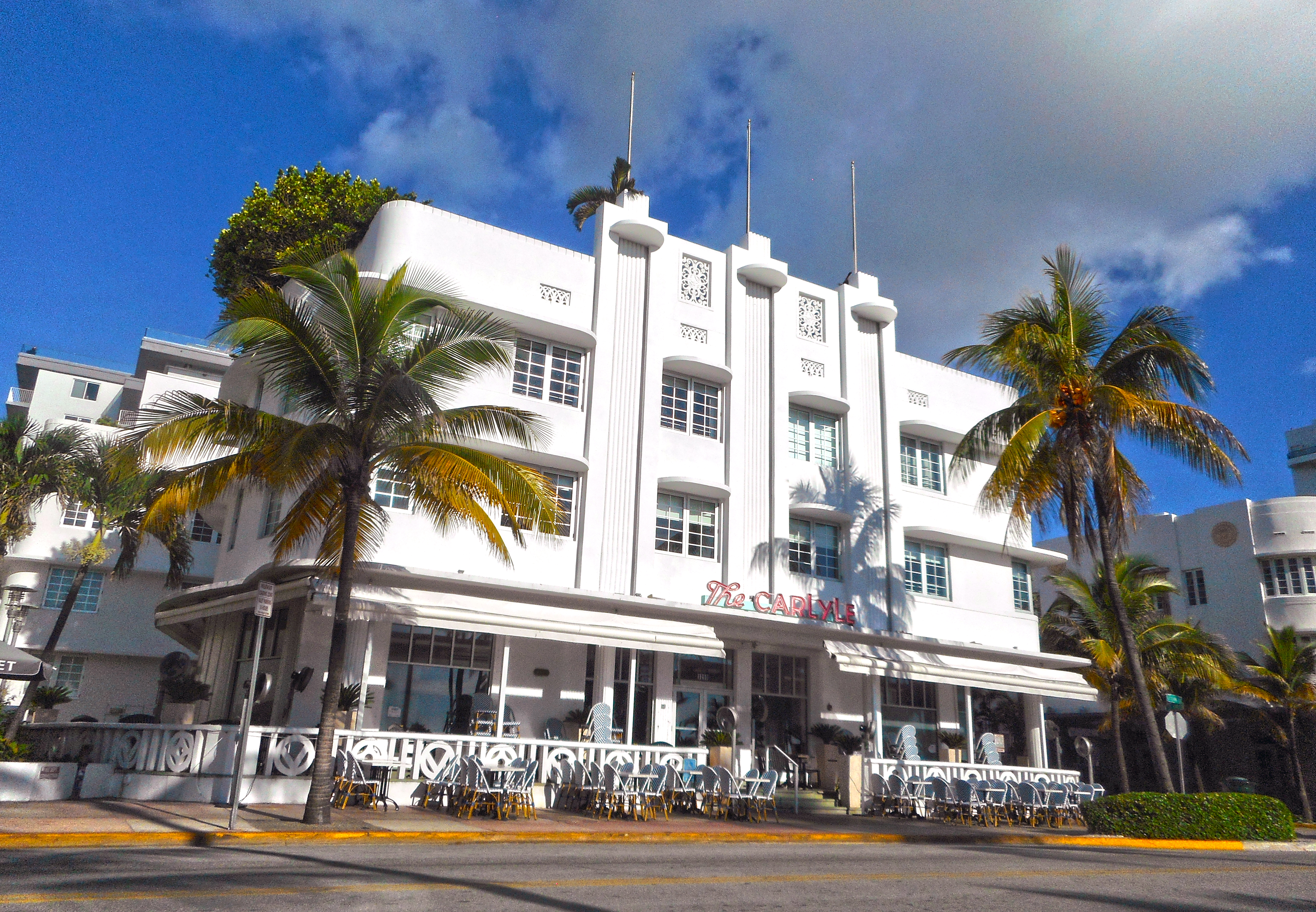
The Carlyle hotel in 2017, following renovation as a residential condominium complex

Bea Arthur had grown tired of starring in The Golden Girls, and chose not to return for an eighth season. As a result, the show was retitled and revamped as a new series, The Golden Palace, with Betty White, Rue McClanahan, and Estelle Getty reprising their roles.

Like the original series, The Golden Palace was also created by Susan Harris, who once again served as executive producer alongside Paul Junger Witt and Tony Thomas. The trio had mixed feelings about the new series, but felt obligated to continue onward for the sake of the cast and crew. Thomas said, "We had been employing a lot of people, so to just pull the plug would have meant ending something that provided a very satisfying life for a lot of people". White said that she and her Golden Girls co-stars were initially skeptical of the new series but, "To our great surprise, we are having a ball. It's coming together much better than we had thought". McClanahan had suggested keeping the original series and adding a fourth roommate to replace Arthur's character, but this idea was rejected by the producers.

British comedian Alexei Sayle was originally hired to play the hotel's chef, who initially was to be portrayed as Eastern European. Sayle was replaced by Cheech Marin before the pilot was shot. The idea of having a Latino chef as a comic foil to the rest of the cast had originally been proposed at the beginning of The Golden Girls; the original chef, Coco (portrayed by Charles Levin), appeared in the first episode of The Golden Girls but was written out due to concerns about how to work him into later scripts with a cast of four women with strong personalities. With Arthur gone and the core group down to three, the concept was revived. Marin had wanted to branch out into television and away from being typecast as a Los Angeles stoner, and had previously worked on a film project with Witt. Marin was promised a spin-off series for his character in the event that The Golden Palace were successful. The Golden Palace marked Marin's and Don Cheadle's first starring roles in a television series. According to Cheadle, the director of photography had trouble with him and White in shared scenes due to their heavily contrasted complexions; White's hair and makeup had to be altered to reduce the contrast, ensuring Cheadle was properly lit.

The Carlyle hotel on Miami Beach's Ocean Drive was used for exterior shots depicting the Golden Palace hotel, while the rest of the series was taped at Ren-Mar Studios in Hollywood, California. On The Golden Girls, Getty often had to reshoot her scenes as she had trouble remembering her lines. McClanahan noted that this was not the case on The Golden Palace, speculating that Getty may have been subconsciously intimidated by Arthur.

=== Cancellation and aftermath ===
Ratings were initially solid, with the show winning its timeslot for its first few weeks, but viewership fell steadily as the season progressed. A second season was to be greenlit according to McClanahan, but network executives decided to cancel the show a couple of hours before the upfronts. CBS opted not to renew the series, canceling it in May 1993. Harris attributed the series' failure to Arthur's absence, saying it did not work without her.

The show's sole season was rated 57th in the rankings, and was canceled alongside Major Dad and Designing Women.

Following the cancellation, White joined the short-lived second season of Bob, which had aired in the same block as The Golden Palace for its first season. Getty went on to portray Sophia in the later seasons of another Golden Girls spin-off, Empty Nest. The character returned to the rebuilt Shady Pines retirement home, which had burned down in the previous series. What became of the characters of Rose, Blanche, Roland, Chuy, and the hotel is left unresolved.

=== Notable episodes ===
In 2020, amid the Black Lives Matter movement and following the murder of George Floyd, the episode "Camp Town Races Aren't Nearly as Much Fun as They Used to Be" attracted attention for how it had addressed the issues of racism and the Confederate battle flag. Journalist Seb Starcevic first drew attention to the episode in a Twitter thread that became popular before the wider media began to pick up the story.

== Broadcast history ==
The Golden Palace aired on CBS, changing networks from NBC, which had aired The Golden Girls on Saturday nights for its entire run. NBC was willing to greenlight a 13-episode order for The Golden Palace, but the series producers were not satisfied with this number and moved the series to CBS, which promised a full season. NBC had been seeking a younger demographic, and The Golden Girls did not fit into its plans. White believed that a new network would be beneficial for the series.

CBS used The Golden Palace as one of four comedies assembled on Friday night in an effort to combat ABC's TGIF comedy block; The Golden Palace was grouped with Major Dad, Designing Women, and Bob, all of which were either successful comedies prior to the move, or in the case of Bob, featured a previously successful sitcom star (Bob Newhart).

Syndication of the series is handled by Disney–ABC Domestic Television. Although the series has never been syndicated as a stand-alone series, Lifetime, during the time it owned the rights to The Golden Girls, carried The Golden Palace on several occasions in the mid-2000s, running the series in rotation as a de facto eighth season of The Golden Girls. The show's existence is generally not well known. According to McClanahan, most Golden Girls fans were unaware of the series until reruns began airing on Lifetime.

In recognition of what would have been White's 100th birthday, The Golden Palace became available on the Hulu streaming platform January 10, 2022.

== Reception ==
Writing for the Los Angeles Times, Rick Du Brow stated that Harris "deserves plenty of credit for infusing the premiere of the tired old series with new verve, drive and wit in its resuscitated form". The Orlando Sentinel wrote that the premise "seemed like one of the worst ideas of the year," but found that the premiere episode "crackles with the same energy that marked the early years of The Golden Girls," writing further, "The change of scenery, plus fresh chemistry created by the addition of new characters, relieves the numbing sense of deja vu that settled over the characters" in the final seasons of the previous series.

However, John J. O'Connor of The New York Times wrote, "It's all a bit too familiar, and the format is forced into some unseemly stretching". Tom Shales of The Washington Post gave a mixed review of the pilot episode but praised White's performance, writing "she seems faster and fresher than ever. Arthur's absence is felt (and duly noted in a sly joke or two), but without Betty White, this is one show that clearly could not go on."

Several critics praised the series after it debuted on Hulu. Robert Lloyd, writing for the Los Angeles Times, applauded the cast "even if they are playing in a sequel to a show people remember better and love more". Eliot Glazer of Vulture considered the cast to have "undeniable" chemistry despite the absence of Arthur. Megan McCaffrey of Collider wrote that the series "takes the groundwork laid by the original and runs with it into a successful spinoff". Conversely, TVLine ranked it as the 20th-worst television spinoff ever.
