= Paul Junger Witt =

American film producer (1941–2018)

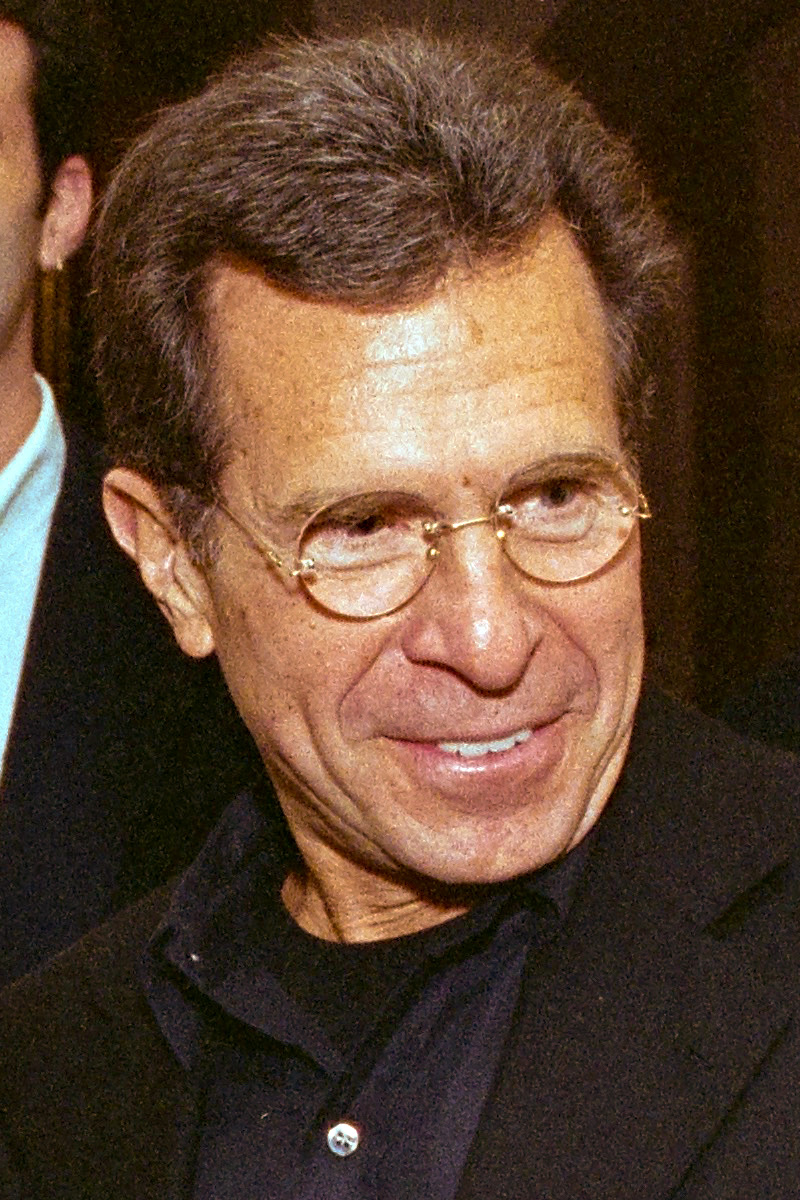
- Witt in the White House in 1999
- Born: March 20, 1941; New York City, New York, U.S.
- Died: April 27, 2018 (aged 77); Los Angeles, California, U.S.
- Occupations: Film and television producer
- Years active: 1966–2018
- Spouses: Ann McLaughlin (m. 1968; div. 1978) Susan Harris (m. 1983)

Paul Junger Witt (March 20, 1941 – April 27, 2018) was an American film and television producer. He, with his partners Tony Thomas and Susan Harris (also his wife), produced such television shows as Here Come the Brides, The Partridge Family, The Golden Girls, Soap, Benson, It's a Living, Empty Nest, and Blossom. The majority of their shows have been produced by their company, Witt/Thomas Productions (alternately Witt/Thomas/Harris Productions), founded in 1975. Witt also produced the films Dead Poets Society, Three Kings, Insomnia, and the made-for-TV movie Brian's Song. He was a graduate of the University of Virginia.

== Personal life ==
Witt married Ann McLaughlin with whom he had 3 children, Christopher, Anthony, and Genevieve. After their divorce, he married Susan Harris on September 18, 1983. They have one son together, Oliver Witt.

== Death ==
Witt died of cancer in Los Angeles on April 27, 2018, at age 77.

== Filmography ==
He was a producer in all films unless otherwise noted.

=== Film ===
Year	Film	Notes
1984	Firstborn	
1989	Dead Poets Society	
1992	Final Analysis	
1994	Mixed Nuts	
1999	Three Kings	
2002	Insomnia	
2011	A Better Life	Final film as a producer

=== Television ===
Year	Title	Credit	Notes
1966−67	Occasional Wife	Associate producer	
1967−68	The Second Hundred Years	Associate producer	
1968−70	Here Come the Brides		
1970−71	The Partridge Family		
1971	Getting Together		
1971	Brian's Song		Television film
1972	Bobby Jo and the Good Time Band		Television film
1972	No Place to Run		Television film
1972	Home for the Holidays		Television film
1972	The Rookies		
1973	A Cold Night's Death		Television film
1973	The Letters		Television film
1973	Blood Sport		Television film
1974	Remember When		Television film
1974	The Gun and the Pulpit	Executive producer	Television film
1975	Satan's Triangle	Executive producer	Television film
1975	Fay	Executive producer	
1976	Griffin and Phoenix	Executive producer	Television film
1976	High Risk	Executive producer	Television film
1976	The Practice	Executive producer	
1977	Loves Me, Loves Me Not		
1980	The Yeagers	Executive producer	
1980	Trouble in High Timber Country	Executive producer	Television film
1977−81	Soap	Executive producer	
1980−81	I'm a Big Girl Now	Executive producer	
1982	It Takes Two	Executive producer	
1983	Condo	Executive producer	
1985	Hail to the Chief	Executive producer	
1979−86	Benson	Executive producer	
1986	Tough Cookies	Executive producer	
1986	Comedy Factory	Executive producer	
1986−87	One Big Family	Executive producer	
1987	The Line	Executive producer	Television film
1987	Mama's Boy		
1980−89	It's a Living	Executive producer	
1989	Heartland	Executive producer	
1990	The Earth Day Special	Executive producer	Television special
1990	We'll Take Manhattan	Executive producer	Television film
1987−90	Beauty and the Beast	Executive producer	
1991	Good & Evil	Executive producer	
1990−91	Lenny	Executive producer	
1992	Walter & Emily	Executive producer	
1985−92	The Golden Girls	Executive producer	
1992	Woops!	Executive producer	
1992−93	The Golden Palace	Executive producer	
1993	Country Estates	Executive producer	Television film
1991−94	Herman's Head	Executive producer	
1991−94	Nurses	Executive producer	
1994	Daddy's Girls	Executive producer	
1994	Close to Home	Executive producer	Television film
1990−95	Blossom	Executive producer	
1995	Muscle	Executive producer	
1988−95	Empty Nest	Executive producer	
1995	The Office	Executive producer	
1996	Local Heroes	Executive producer	
1996	Radiant City	Executive producer	Television film
1996	Common Law		
1995−96	Minor Adjustments	Executive producer	
1993−96	The John Larroquette Show	Executive producer	
1995−97	Brotherly Love	Executive producer	
1996−97	Pearl	Executive producer	
1998	The Secret Lives of Men	Executive producer	
1999	Everything's Relative	Executive producer	
2014	Feed Me	Executive producer	
2012−16	Beauty & the Beast	Executive producer	

As director

Year	Title
1967	Occasional Wife
1967−68	The Second Hundred Years
1968−70	Here Come the Brides
1970−71	The Partridge Family
1971	Getting Together

Miscellaneous crew

Year	Title	Role
1965−66	The Farmer's Daughter	Assistant to the producer

As writer

Year	Title
1985	Hail to the Chief
