= Tony Thomas (producer) =

American producer

- Born: Charles Anthony Jacobs; December 7, 1948 (age 77); Hollywood, California, U.S.
- Occupations: TV and film producer, director
- Years active: 1971–present
- Spouse: Ann Souder (m. 2005)
- Parent(s): Danny Thomas; Rose Marie Cassaniti
- Relatives: Marlo Thomas (sister)

Charles Anthony Thomas (né Jacobs; born December 7, 1948) is an American television and film producer. He was a producer for the feature film Dead Poets Society for which he was nominated for the Academy Award for Best Picture in 1989, and Insomnia, among other films.

He is the producer of many successful television series from the 1970s into the 1990s such as The Golden Girls for which he won the Primetime Emmy Award for Outstanding Comedy Series twice and won three consecutive Golden Globe Awards for Best Television Series – Musical or Comedy. Thomas was the producer of Blossom and many other TV series. He is the co-founder of Witt/Thomas Productions.

== Early life and family ==
Born Charles Anthony Jacobs in Hollywood, California, Thomas is the son of actor and philanthropist Danny Thomas and his wife, Rose Marie (Cassaniti) Thomas. His father was of Lebanese descent and his mother was of Italian descent. He is the younger brother of actresses Terre Thomas and Marlo Thomas.

== Career ==
Thomas began working in Hollywood film/TV production at Screen Gems as an associate producer on the acclaimed television movie Brian's Song. In 1974, he teamed with producer Paul Junger Witt and wife Susan Harris to form a TV production company, Witt/Thomas Productions (alternately Witt/Thomas/Harris Productions), which produced numerous successful television series from the 1970s into the 1990s.

He has produced many TV series, including The Practice (1976–1977), Nurses, Herman's Head, Soap, Blossom, Empty Nest, Benson, Beauty and the Beast, The Golden Girls, Brotherly Love, The John Larroquette Show and It's a Living. He was a producer for the feature film Dead Poets Society.

Thomas serves as a member of the ALSAC/St. Jude Boards of Directors and Governors, directing the operation of the St. Jude Children's Research Hospital that his father had founded.

== Personal life ==
Thomas married Ann Souder on Christmas Eve 2005 in Montecito, California.

== Filmography ==
He was a producer of all films unless otherwise noted.

=== Film ===
Year	Film	Credit
1984	Firstborn	
1989	Dead Poets Society	
1992	Final Analysis	
1994	Mixed Nuts	
2002	Insomnia	Executive producer
2011	A Better Life	Executive producer

=== Television ===
Year	Title	Credit	Notes
1971	The Sheriff	Associate producer	Television pilot
1971	Brian's Song	Associate producer	Television film
1972	No Place to Run	Associate producer	Television film
1972	Home for the Holidays	Associate producer	Television film
1973	A Cold Night's Death	Associate producer	Television film
1973	Snatched		Television film
1973	The Letters	Associate producer	Television film
1973	Blood Sport		Television film
1974	Remember When	Associate producer	Television film
1974	The Gun and the Pulpit	Associate producer	Television film
1975	Satan's Triangle	Executive producer	Television film
1975	Fay		
1976	Griffin and Phoenix		Television film
1976	High Risk	Associate producer	Television film
1976	The Practice		
1977	Loves Me, Loves Me Not		
1978	That's Hollywood	Co-producer	Documentary
1980	The Yeagers	Executive producer	
1980	Trouble in High Timber Country	Executive producer	Television film
1977−81	Soap	Executive producer	
1980−81	I'm a Big Girl Now	Executive producer	
1982−83	It Takes Two	Executive producer	
1983	Condo	Executive producer	
1985	Just Married!		Television special
1985	Hail to the Chief	Executive producer	
1979−86	Benson	Executive producer	
1986	Tough Cookies	Executive producer	
1986	Comedy Factory	Executive producer	
1986−87	One Big Family	Executive producer	
1987	The Line	Executive producer	Television film
1987	Mama's Boy		
1980−89	It's a Living	Executive producer	
1989	Heartland	Executive producer	
1990	We'll Take Manhattan	Executive producer	Television film
1987−90	Beauty and the Beast	Executive producer	
1991	Good & Evil	Executive producer	
1990−91	Lenny	Executive producer	
1992	Walter & Emily	Executive producer	
1985−92	The Golden Girls	Executive producer	
1992	Woops!	Executive producer	
1992−93	The Golden Palace	Executive producer	
1993	Country Estates	Executive producer	Television film
1991−94	Herman's Head	Executive producer	
1991−94	Nurses	Executive producer	
1994	Daddy's Girls	Executive producer	
1994	Close to Home	Executive producer	Television film
1990−95	Blossom	Executive producer	
1995	Muscle	Executive producer	
1988−95	Empty Nest	Executive producer	
1995	The Office	Executive producer	
1996	Local Heroes	Executive producer	
1996	Radiant City	Executive producer	Television film
1996	Common Law		
1995−96	Minor Adjustments	Executive producer	
1993−96	The John Larroquette Show	Executive producer	
1995−97	Brotherly Love	Executive producer	
1996−97	Pearl	Executive producer	
1998	The Secret Lives of Men	Executive producer	
1999	Everything's Relative	Executive producer	
2014	Feed Me	Executive producer	
2012−16	Beauty & the Beast	Executive producer	

Miscellaneous crew

Year	Title	Role
1970−71	The Young Rebels	Assistant to the producer

As writer

Year	Title	Notes
1969	Hogan's Heroes	
1978	That's Hollywood	Documentary
1985	Hail to the Chief	
1987	The West That Never Was	Television special

As an actor

Year	Title	Role
1956−58	The Danny Thomas Show	Rusty's Friend / Child Singer
1969	That Girl	Tony Cassanetti

As director

Year	Title	Notes
1987	The West That Never Was	Television special

Production manager

Year	Title	Role	Notes
1974	Remember When	Production executive	Television film

Soundtrack

Year	Title	Role	Notes
1956	The Danny Thomas Show	Performer: "I'm Looking Over a Four Leaf Clover"	Uncredited
