= Pearl (TV series) =

- Genre: Sitcom
- Created by: Don Reo
- Starring: Rhea Perlman; Carol Kane; Kevin Corrigan; Dash Mihok; Lucy Liu; Malcolm McDowell
- Composer: Craig Safan
- Country of origin: United States
- Original language: English
- No. of seasons: 1
- No. of episodes: 22

Production
- Executive producers: Don Reo; Paul Junger Witt; Rhea Perlman; Tony Thomas; Gary S. Levine
- Camera setup: Multi-camera
- Running time: 30 minutes
- Production companies: Impact Zone Productions; Witt/Thomas Productions; Warner Bros. Television

Original release
- Network: CBS
- Release: September 16, 1996 – June 25, 1997

Pearl is an American sitcom television series which aired on CBS from September 16, 1996 until June 25, 1997. The series starred Rhea Perlman, in what was her return to television after the conclusion of her long-running series Cheers three years earlier on NBC. Don Reo created the series, and Perlman served as an executive producer alongside Reo, Paul Junger Witt, Tony Thomas and Gary S. Levine. Pearl was produced by Impact Zone Productions and Witt/Thomas Productions in association with Warner Bros. Television.

== Plot ==
Pearl Caraldo (Rhea Perlman), a middle-aged widow, is the loading dock manager for University Electronics but who wants to achieve a higher level of education. She is accepted as a night student at the prestigious Swindon University. By contrast, her 20-year-old son Joey (Dash Mihok), a single father with no apparent ambition, is disappointed that his mother is no longer readily available as a live-in babysitter for his infant daughter. Also less than thrilled is Pearl's sister-in-law Annie (Carol Kane), who is concerned that with her greater educational attainment, Pearl will become another "one of them intellectuals." A professor of a required course, Stephen Pynchon (Malcolm McDowell), further complicates matters by his belief that higher education is for a cultured elite, not working-class people like Pearl, and sets out to embarrass and belittle her whenever possible in hopes that she will withdraw from the university.

== Cast ==
=== Main cast ===
- Rhea Perlman as Pearl Caraldo
- Carol Kane as Annie Caraldo
- Kevin Corrigan as Franklin 'Frankie' Spivak
- Dash Mihok as Joey Caraldo
- Lucy Liu as Amy Li
- Malcolm McDowell as Prof. Stephen Pynchon

=== Guest cast ===
- Candice Azzara as Beverly Steinberg
- Billy Connolly as William 'Billy' Pynchon
- Alice Cooper as Himself
- Nikki Cox as Margaret Woodrow
- Bryan Cranston as Isaac Perlow
- Ted Danson as Sal
- Jonathan Del Arco as Carlo Morra
- Danny DeVito as Dean Aston Martin
- Seth Green as Bob
- Steve Landesberg as Saul Steinberg
- Aubrey Morris as Professor Lockwood
- Kenny Rogers as Himself
- Mara Wilson as Samantha Stein

== Production ==
When Malcolm McDowell's name was put forward as a candidate to play Prof. Pynchon, creator Don Reo was initially skeptical, feeling that McDowell was more associated with villainous parts, but when McDowell read for the part, it was clear that he was very suitable. McDowell modeled the character on Lindsay Anderson, as well as British comics Eric Morecambe, Benny Hill, and John Cleese.

== Episodes ==
No.	Title	Directed by	Written by	Original release date	Prod. code	Viewers (millions)
1	"Pilot"	James Burrows	Don Reo	September 16, 1996	001	23.60
Pearl Caraldo, who has been recently widowed, decides to return to college, but immediately encounters an arrogant professor.
2	"Teacher's Pet"	Robby Benson	Judith D. Allison & Don Reo	September 18, 1996	002	13.7
Pearl wants to get on the right side of Prof. Pynchon, so she volunteers to become his teaching assistant, but finds it is taking up all her time.
3	"Your Cheatin' Heart"	Jay Sandrich	Janis Hirsch	September 23, 1996	004	18.75
Pearl cheats on a test, but admits it and asks for the opportunity to make up her grade with an oral exam.
4	"Billy"	James Burrows	Judith D. Allison & Don Reo	September 30, 1996	003	17.38
Prof. Pynchon's estranged brother Billy (Billy Connolly) comes to town to try to reconcile with his brother to fulfill their father's last request.
5	"The Naked Truth"	James Burrows	Janis Hirsch	October 7, 1996	005	16.72
Pearl's longtime friendship with Annie is tested when long buried truths begin to emerge.
6	"Pynchon's Pynchon"	John Whitesell	Teresa O'Neill	October 14, 1996	007	15.1
Prof. Pynchon's former mentor (Aubrey Morris) comes to town to promote his new book, but Pynchon is shocked when he discovers it's his own Oxford graduate thesis.
7	"Ticket to Ride"	Gil Junger	Teresa O'Neill	October 30, 1996	006	12.7
Prof. Pynchon asks Pearl for a ride to New York City to see a play, she mistakenly thinks he's asked her out, but he is planning to go to the theater with a friend.
8	"Homecoming: Part 1"	Terry Hughes	Judith D. Allison & Don Reo	November 6, 1996	008	11.2
Pearl's new classmate, Carlo (Jonathan Del Arco), falls hard for her and asks her to a dance, Pearl lies, saying she is already going with Professor Pynchon.
9	"Homecoming: Part 2"	Terry Hughes	Judith D. Allison & Don Reo	November 13, 1996	009	14.0
A number of dates for the grand homecoming ball hinge on a lost wager, an attempted bribe, second thoughts and fate.
10	"Lessons in Love"	Peter Chakos	Judith D. Allison & Don Reo	November 20, 1996	011	13.0
Prof. Pynchon chains himself to the library doors when the University threatens to ban certain books. Pearl decides that she must join him in the fight against censorship.
11	"The Tutor"	John Ratzenberger	Josh Goldsmith & Cathy Yuspa	December 11, 1996	012	11.4
Pearl asks for the advice of a University "senior advisor", 9-year-old genius, Samantha (Mara Wilson). In return Pearl advises Samantha on how to be a kid.
12	"Christmas Daze"	Don Scardino	Don Reo	December 18, 1996	014	9.9
An attack dog that Pynchon's brother sent him for Christmas proves to be a bit overzealous and prevents Pynchon and Pearl from leaving the classroom on Christmas Eve.
13	"Power Play"	Gil Junger	Terri Minsky	January 8, 1997	010	11.82
Prof. Pynchon's students have written papers on the abuse of power, and Pynchon assigns them to grade one another's work which results in a great deal of friction.
14	"Pearls Before Swine"	Peter Bonerz	Janis Hirsch	January 15, 1997	013	10.75
When Uncle Bobo's widow Tina arrives to collect a $5,000 debt incurred by Pearl's deceased husband, Pearl fears she will have to drop out of school to repay the debt.
15	"Mission ImPearlsible"	Peter Chakos	Don Reo	January 29, 1997	016	9.51
Pearl, Amy and Frankie work on a project with "Weird Guy Bob" (Seth Green) who sabotages their paper, so the group have to break into Pynchon's house to replace it.
16	"Dean Cuisine"	Don Scardino	Janis Hirsch	February 5, 1997	017	10.75
The Dean of the University, Dean Aston Martin (Danny DeVito), asks Pearl out for a date as she turns out to be a dead ringer for his late wife.
17	"The Write Stuff: Part 1"	Don Scardino	Judith D. Allison & Don Reo	February 12, 1997	015	10.68
Pearl is working on an assignment, but is suffering from writer's block, meanwhile Joey's ex-wife arrives in town.
18	"The Write Stuff: Part 2"	Don Scardino	Judith D. Allison & Don Reo	February 19, 1997	018	10.81
Pearl continues working on her writing assignment and she incorporates elements from her own life into the paper, creating a fantasy version of her late husband (Ted Danson).
19	"The Two Mrs. Rizzos"	Pamela Fryman	Teresa O'Neill	June 4, 1997	019	7.53
Annie's ex-boyfriend, Freddy Rizzo (Sam McMurray), is released from prison and seems to be attracted to both Annie and Pearl.
20	"Mommy Dearest"	Ken Levine	Michael Platt	June 11, 1997	020	6.51
Frankie's mother, Miriam Spivak (Carlene Watkins), arrives in town and announces that she's left Frankie's father, and Pearl discovers she is having a fling with Prof. Pynchon.
21	"My So-Called Real Life"	Don Scardino	Gary Janetti	June 18, 1997	021	6.15
Frankie submits a documentary film about Pearl, Amy, Joey, Annie and Pynchon in lieu of a written term paper which causes conflict.
22	"Billy Returns"	Don Scardino	Judith D. Allison & Don Reo	June 25, 1997	022	6.10
Pynchon's brother (Billy Connolly) returns to town and asks Pearl on a date. Pearl isn't sure if he really likes her or if he is just trying to annoy his brother.

== Release ==
Pearl was broadcast on Wednesday evenings at 8:30 p.m. on CBS, opposite The John Larroquette Show on NBC, a show that was also created by Don Reo. Reo said "It's a really difficult, bizarre phenomenon, ... the Larroquette show is in its fourth year and the last thing in the world I want to do is contribute to its demise."

== Reception ==
=== Critical reception ===
Pearl received very positive reviews, David Bianculli reviewed it in the New York Daily News comparing it to the 1973 movie The Paper Chase, and calling it "a gem." He also said James Burrows "directs the pilot masterfully." For the Buffalo News, Alan Pergament said that "McDowell really is the star of the show, delivering his sarcastic lines with relish," and that "with some minor polishing" the show "could really give Perlman something more to cheer about." Tom Jicha in the Sun-Sentinel also called it "a gem" and says that Perlman and McDowell's "exchanges crackle with venomous vitality." He also calls McDowell "a revelation in his episodic TV debut" stating that "he has the comedic timing of someone who has been doing it all his life."

=== Awards ===
Year	Association	Category	Nominated artist/work	Result
1997	American Choreography Awards	Outstanding Achievement in Television	Toni Basil	Won
1997	Young Artist Awards	Best Performance in a TV Comedy - Guest Starring Young Performer	Bridget Flanery	Nominated
