= Tough Cookies =

- Genre: Comedy
- Created by: Hal Dresner
- Starring: Robby Benson; Lainie Kazan; Art Metrano; Adam Arkin; Matt Craven; Alan North; Elizabeth Peña
- Composer: George Aliceson Tipton
- Country of origin: United States
- Original language: English
- No. of seasons: 1
- No. of episodes: 6

Production
- Executive producers: Tony Thomas; Paul Junger Witt
- Producers: Stephen Neigher; Lynn Guthrie
- Camera setup: Single-camera
- Running time: 30 minutes
- Production company: Witt/Thomas Productions

Original release
- Network: CBS
- Release: March 5 – April 23, 1986

Tough Cookies is an American television sitcom created by Hal Dresner that aired on CBS from March 5 to April 23, 1986; six episodes were broadcast. The series stars Robby Benson as Detective Cliff Brady, a plainclothes detective assigned to a precinct in a tough Southside Chicago neighborhood where he grew up, and Lainie Kazan as Rita, who runs the Windbreaker, a local saloon that serves as Brady's regular hangout. Benson, a former juvenile film star who had recently turned 30, took the role in an attempt to establish a more adult screen image.

== Plot ==
Chicago police detective Cliff Brady (Robby Benson) is dating an older woman named Rita (Lainie Kazan), who is not sure she can handle their relationship.

== Cast ==
- Robby Benson as Det. Cliff Brady
- Lainie Kazan as Rita
- Art Metrano as Lt. Iverson
- Alan North as Father McCaskey
- Adam Arkin as Danny Polchek
- Elizabeth Peña as Off. Connie Rivera
- Matt Craven as Richie Messina

== Episodes ==
No.	Title	Directed by	Written by	Original release date
1	"Ships in the Night"	Paul Krasny	Jan Fischer & William Weidner	March 5, 1986
2	"Grudge Match"	John Patterson	Mark Rosner	March 12, 1986
Cliff's high school basketball rival now collects protection money, and Cliff challenges him to a game.
3	"Naked City"	James Frawley	Stephen Neigher	March 19, 1986
4	"The Unfantasy"	Robert Scheerer	Vincent Patrick	April 2, 1986
5	"The Stoolie"	Georg Stanford Brown	Vincent Patrick	April 9, 1986
6	"Temper Fidelis"	Stuart Margolin	Stephen Neigher	April 23, 1986
