= The Golden Girls =

American sitcom (1985–1992)

- Genre: Sitcom; Blue comedy Comedy-drama
- Created by: Susan Harris
- Starring: Bea Arthur; Betty White; Rue McClanahan; Estelle Getty
- Theme music composer: Andrew Gold
- Opening theme: "Thank You for Being a Friend" performed by Cynthia Fee
- Ending theme: "Thank You for Being a Friend" (instrumental)
- Composer: George Tipton
- Country of origin: United States
- Original language: English
- No. of seasons: 7
- No. of episodes: 180 (list of episodes)

Production
- Executive producers: Susan Harris; Paul Junger Witt; Tony Thomas
- Camera setup: Videotape, Multi-camera
- Running time: 22–24 minutes
- Production companies: Witt/Thomas/Harris Productions; Touchstone Television

Original release
- Network: NBC
- Release: September 14, 1985 – May 9, 1992

Related
- The Golden Palace; Empty Nest; Nurses

The Golden Girls is an American sitcom created by Susan Harris that aired on NBC from September 14, 1985, to May 9, 1992. The series comprises 180 half-hour episodes across seven seasons and features an ensemble cast led by Bea Arthur, Betty White, Rue McClanahan, and Estelle Getty. Set in Miami, Florida, the show centers on four older women who share a home and navigate friendship, aging, and daily life.

The series was produced by Witt/Thomas/Harris Productions in association with Touchstone Television. Paul Junger Witt, Tony Thomas, and Susan Harris served as the original executive producers.

The Golden Girls received critical acclaim during its original run and earned numerous accolades, including two Primetime Emmy Awards for Outstanding Comedy Series and three Golden Globe Awards for Best Television Series – Musical or Comedy. Each of the four lead actresses won a Primetime Emmy Award, making it one of only four sitcoms in history in which all principal cast members received Emmy recognition. The show ranked among the Nielsen top 10 for six of its seven seasons.

In 2013, TV Guide ranked The Golden Girls number 54 on its list of the 60 Best Series of All Time. In 2014, the Writers Guild of America placed the sitcom at number 69 in their list of the "101 Best Written TV Series of All Time". Terry Tang of the Associated Press reported that the series continues to attract new fans in the 21st century and characterized it as an example of a sitcom that has aged well.

== Premise ==
The show revolves around four older single women (three widows and one divorcée) sharing a house in Miami while navigating their "golden years" with humor, friendship, and occasional chaos. The owner of the house is a widow named Blanche Devereaux (McClanahan), who was joined by fellow widow Rose Nylund (White) and divorcée Dorothy Zbornak (Arthur) after they both responded to an ad on the bulletin board of a local grocery store, a year before the start of the series. In the pilot episode, the three are joined by Dorothy's 80-year-old widowed mother, Sophia Petrillo (Getty), after the retirement home where she lived burned down.

Many episodes of the series followed a similar format or theme. For example, one or more of the women would become involved in some sort of problem, often involving other family members, men, or an ethical dilemma. At some point, they would gather around the kitchen table and discuss the problem, sometimes late at night and often while eating cheesecake, ice cream, cake, or some other dessert. One of the other girls then told a story from her own life, which somehow related to the problem (though Rose occasionally regaled the others with a nonsense story that had nothing to do with the situation, and Sophia told outrageous, made-up stories). Some episodes featured flashbacks to previous episodes, flashbacks to events not shown in previous episodes, or to events that occurred before the series began.

=== Finale ===
The Golden Girls came to an end when Bea Arthur chose to leave the series. In the hour-long series finale, which aired in May 1992, Dorothy meets and marries Blanche's uncle Lucas (Leslie Nielsen) and moves to Hollingsworth Manor in Atlanta. Sophia is to join her, but in the end, she stays behind with the other women in Miami. This led into the spin-off series The Golden Palace.

The series finale of The Golden Girls was watched by 27.2 million viewers. As of 2016, it was the 17th-most watched television finale.

== Episodes ==
Season	Episodes	Originally released		Rank	Rating	Viewers (millions)
Season	Episodes	First released	Last released	Rank	Rating	Viewers (millions)
1	25	September 14, 1985	May 10, 1986	7	21.8	—N/a
2	26	September 27, 1986	May 16, 1987	5	24.5	—N/a
3	25	September 19, 1987	May 7, 1988	4	21.8	—N/a
4	26	October 8, 1988	May 13, 1989	6	21.4	33.1
5	26	September 23, 1989	May 5, 1990	6	20.1	30.8
6	26	September 22, 1990	May 4, 1991	10	16.5	24.6
7	26	September 21, 1991	May 9, 1992	30	13.1	19.2

== Cast and characters ==
=== Main ===
The main cast of the series (from left): Estelle Getty as Sophia, Rue McClanahan as Blanche, Betty White as Rose, and Beatrice Arthur as Dorothy

- Beatrice Arthur as Dorothy Zbornak (née Petrillo, later Zbornak-Hollingsworth), an Italian American substitute teacher born in Brooklyn, New York City, to Sicilian immigrants Sophia and Salvadore "Sal" Petrillo. Dorothy became pregnant while still in high school, resulting in a marriage to Stanley "Stan" Zbornak (Herb Edelman) to legitimize the baby. Stan and Dorothy divorced after 38 years when Stan left the marriage for a young flight attendant. The marriage produced two children, Kate and Michael. In the series' final episode, Dorothy marries Blanche's uncle, Lucas Hollingsworth, and relocates to Atlanta. In season one, episode seven, Dorothy is stated to be 55. She is practical, sarcastic, short tempered, a follower of current events, and is often seen as the voice of reason.
- Betty White as Rose Marie Nylund (née Lindström), a Norwegian American, from the small farming town of St. Olaf, Minnesota. Often naive and known for her humorously peculiar stories of life growing up in her hometown, Rose was happily married to Charlie Nylund, with whom she had five children: daughters Kirsten, Bridget, and Gunilla, and sons Adam and Charlie Jr. Upon her husband's death, she moved to Miami. She eventually finds work at a grief counseling center, but later switches careers and becomes assistant to a consumer reporter, Enrique Mas, at a local TV station. In later seasons, Rose becomes romantically involved with college professor Miles Webber. During season six, Miles is revealed to have been in the Witness Protection Program. Their relationship continues throughout the series and briefly into the sequel series, The Golden Palace. Rose is sweet, kind, and very competitive. Many of the jokes about Rose focus on her perceived lack of intelligence.
- Rue McClanahan as Blanche Elizabeth Devereaux (née Hollingsworth), a Southern belle, employed at an art museum. Born into a wealthy family, Blanche grew up on a plantation outside of Atlanta, Georgia, prior to her relocation to Miami, where she lived with her husband, George, until his death. Their marriage produced five children: daughters Janet and Rebecca, and sons Doug, Biff, and Matthew (nicknamed "Skippy"). A widow, Blanche is portrayed as self absorbed and man hungry, although she still mourns her husband. She has two sisters, Virginia and Charmaine, and a younger brother, Clayton. Another brother, Tad, is seen in the spin-off series. Many of the jokes about Blanche focus on her promiscuity.
- Estelle Getty as Sophia Petrillo (née Grisanti, formerly Petrillo-Weinstock), Dorothy's mother; born in Sicily, Sophia moved to New York after fleeing an arranged marriage to Guido Spirelli. She married Salvadore "Sal" Petrillo, with whom she had three children: Dorothy, Gloria, and Phil, a cross-dresser who later dies of a heart attack (episode "Ebbtide's Revenge"). Initially a resident of the Shady Pines retirement home (after having had a stroke prior to the start of the series), she moved in with Blanche, Rose, and Dorothy following a fire at the institution. Sophia is portrayed as a quick-witted straight talker and a great cook. Despite portraying Dorothy's elderly mother, in reality, Getty was a year younger than Arthur.

=== Recurring ===
- Herb Edelman as Stanley "Stan" Zbornak, Dorothy's cheating, freeloading ex-husband, who left her to marry a young flight attendant, Chrissy, who later left him. Stan married another woman, Catherine, in season four, but they divorced off-screen in season five. Stanley worked as an unsuccessful novelty item salesman until he became a successful entrepreneur by inventing the "Zbornie", which was a utensil used to open baked potatoes. Many of Stan's plot lines were centered around the fact that Dorothy was still bitter about their divorce and the way he left her. Attempts at reconciliation were made by both Stan and Dorothy throughout the series, particularly episode 12 of season one and episodes 16 and 17 of season six. They made peace in the series finale when Stan accepted Dorothy's decision to marry Lucas Hollingsworth.
- Harold Gould as Miles Webber, Rose's professor boyfriend from season five onwards. In season six, Miles reveals he is in the witness protection program and was a bookkeeper for a mobster. Gould also guest-starred once in the first season as Arnie Peterson, Rose's first serious boyfriend after her husband Charlie's death.
- Sid Melton as Salvadore "Sal" Petrillo, Sophia's late husband, is usually seen in dreams or flashback sequences. Melton also appears as Don the Fool, a waiter at a medieval-themed restaurant in season six.
- Shawn Schepps and Debra Engle as Blanche's daughter, Rebecca Devereaux. She was an overweight former model in an emotionally abusive relationship, but she later slimmed down and had a baby girl named Aurora by artificial insemination.
- Monte Markham and Sheree North as Blanche's siblings Clayton Hollingsworth and Virginia Hollingsworth Warren. Virginia and Blanche were estranged from each other for a long time, until they reconciled in season one. They became estranged again in season five after their father's funeral. Clayton is a closeted gay man who had trouble coming out to Blanche. She eventually accepted Clayton and his new boyfriend when the two got married.
- Bill Dana and Nancy Walker portrayed Sophia's siblings Angelo Grisanti Jr. and Angela Grisanti-Vecchio. Bill Dana appears in seven episodes (seasons three through seven), while he also played Sophia's father in a fourth season episode. Nancy Walker starred in two episodes in season two.
- Doris Belack and Dena Dietrich as Gloria Petrillo-Harker, Dorothy's younger sister. She is married to a wealthy man in California. In a two-part episode in Season 7, she has lost all of her money and becomes romantically involved with Stan, but she eventually comes to think of him as a yutz and breaks up with him.
- Scott Jacoby is Dorothy's traveling musician son Michael Zbornak; in season three, he married Lorraine Wagner, an older black woman who sang with his band, but by season five, they are divorced.
- Lynnie Greene (credited as Lyn Greene) is a younger Dorothy in flashbacks.
- Lisa Jane Persky and Deena Freeman portrayed Dorothy's daughter, Kate Zbornak-Griffiths. She was an interior decorator in New York, married to Dennis Griffiths, a podiatrist.

== Production ==
=== Creation ===
"I was running all over the house grabbing anybody who would listen. I kept reading scenes to them and saying, 'God, this is brilliant [...] There's nothing trendy about this show. There are no tricks. It's a classic."
NBC executive Warren Littlefield about reading the pilot script

Ideas for a comedy series about older women emerged during the filming of a television special at NBC Studios in Burbank, California, in August 1984. Produced to introduce the network's 1984–85 season schedule, two actresses appearing on NBC shows, Selma Diamond of Night Court and Doris Roberts of Remington Steele, appeared in a skit promoting the upcoming show Miami Vice as Miami Nice, a parody about old people living in Miami. NBC senior vice president Warren Littlefield was among the executive producers in the audience who were amused by their performance, and he envisioned a series based on the geriatric humor the two were portraying.

Shortly afterward, he met with producers Paul Junger Witt and Tony Thomas, who were pitching a show about a female lawyer. Though Littlefield nixed their idea, he asked if they would be interested in delivering a pilot script for Miami Nice, instead. Their regular writer declined, so Witt asked his wife, Susan Harris, who had been semiretired since the conclusion of their ABC series Soap. She found the concept interesting, as "it was a demographic that had never been addressed," and she soon began work on it. Though her vision of a sitcom about women in their 60s differed from NBC's request for a comedy about women around 40 years old, Littlefield was impressed when he received her pilot script and subsequently approved production of it. The Cosby Show director Jay Sandrich, who had previously worked with Harris, Witt, and Thomas on Soap, agreed to direct the pilot episode.

The pilot included a gay house attendant, Coco (Charles Levin), who lived with the girls. Levin had been suggested by then-NBC president Brandon Tartikoff based on Levin's groundbreaking portrayal of a recurring gay character, Eddie Gregg, on NBC's Emmy-winning drama Hill Street Blues. After the pilot, the character of Coco was eliminated from the series.

The Walt Disney Company, NBC Studios and the creators were named in a federal copyright infringement suit filed by Nancy Bretzfield claiming the show was based on a script rejected by NBC in 1980. The suit was later settled.

According to the actor Mark Feuerstein, Susan Harris has stated that she intended The Golden Girls to be a show about four Jewish women. Feuerstein said that "She wrote it about four old Jewish women living in Florida. They shot a pilot, it was great and everyone was excited, but the network told her 'Rewrite it. Nobody is interested in watching four old Jewish women.'"

=== Casting ===
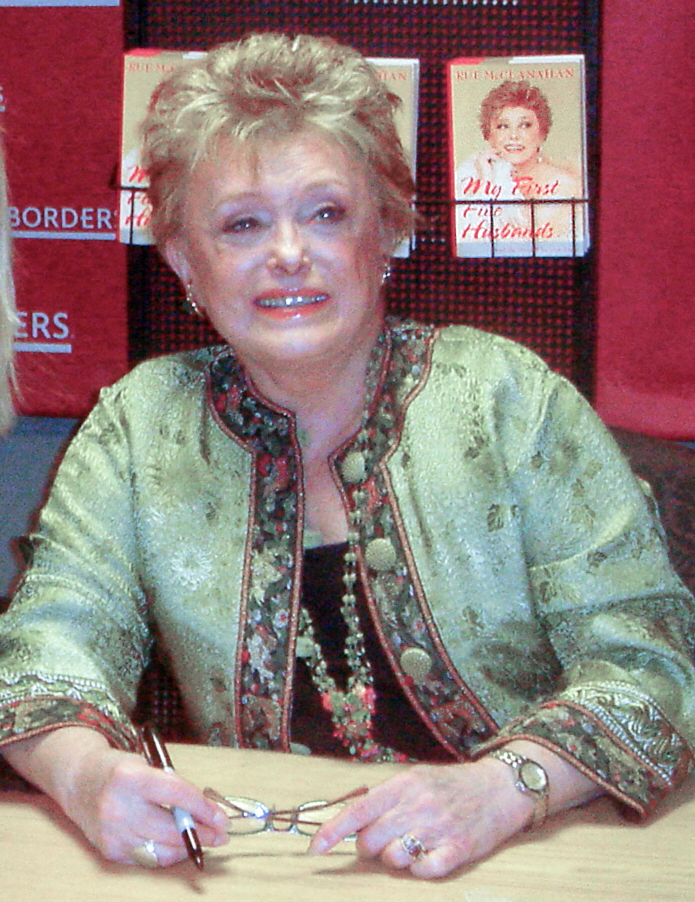
Rue McClanahan in 2007

The part of Sophia Petrillo was the first of the four roles to be cast. Estelle Getty auditioned and won the role as the feisty mother of character Dorothy Zbornak, due, in part, to the rave reviews she garnered in her off-Broadway role reprisal for the 1984 Los Angeles run of Torch Song Trilogy. Afterwards, Getty returned to New York, but her manager sent her back to California in early 1985. Getty figured it would be her last chance to find television or film work, and she would return home to New York if she were unsuccessful.

Casting director Judith Weiner had seen Torch Song Trilogy, and thought Getty was terrific in it. She was also impressed by Getty's audition for the role of the mother of Steven Keaton (played by actor Michael Gross), for a guest episode of Family Ties. Although Getty was impressive, the show's producers went with another actress. Getty came to Weiner's mind soon after, when it became time to begin casting of The Golden Girls.

Getty, who went through a three-hour transformation to become Sophia, wore heavy make-up, thick glasses, and a white wig to look the part. The character of Sophia was thought by the creators to enhance the idea that three retirement-aged women could be young. Disney's Michael Eisner explains, "Estelle Getty made our three women into girls. And that was, to me, what made it seem like it could be a contemporary, young show." Getty continuously battled stage fright during her tenure on the show. In a 1988 interview, Getty commented on her phobia and expressed how working with major stars, such as Arthur and White, made her even more nervous. At times, she even froze on camera while filming.

Hired to shoot the pilot, director Jay Sandrich also became instrumental in helping to cast the roles of Blanche Devereaux and Rose Nylund. Both Rue McClanahan and Betty White came into consideration, as the series Mama's Family, in which the two co-starred, had been cancelled by NBC. Producers wanted to cast McClanahan as Rose and White as Blanche based on roles they had previously played; White portrayed the man-hungry Sue Ann Nivens on The Mary Tyler Moore Show, while McClanahan co-starred as the sweet but scatterbrained Vivian Harmon in Maude. Eager not to be typecast, they took the suggestion of Sandrich and switched roles at the last minute.

In the pilot script, Blanche was described as "more Southern than Blanche DuBois", so McClanahan was perplexed when she was asked by director Sandrich during the filming of the pilot not to use the strong Southern accent she had developed, but to use her natural Oklahoma accent instead. Once the show was picked up for a first season, new director Paul Bogart felt exactly the opposite, insisting that McClanahan use a Southern accent. McClanahan deliberately exaggerated her accent, stating, "I played Blanche the way I felt Blanche. She thought an accentuated Southern accent... would be sexy and strong and attractive to men. She wanted to be a Southern heroine, like Vivien Leigh. In fact, that's who I think she thought she was."

Though Harris had created the character of Dorothy with a "Bea Arthur type" in mind, Littlefield and the producers initially envisioned actress Elaine Stritch for the part. Stritch's audition flopped, however, and under the impression that Arthur did not want to participate, Harris asked McClanahan if she could persuade Arthur, with whom she worked previously on the CBS sitcom Maude, to take the role. Arthur flipped upon reading the script, but felt hesitant about McClanahan's approach, as she did not "want to play (their Maude characters) Maude and Vivian meet Sue Ann Nivens." She reconsidered, however, after hearing that McClanahan and White had switched roles.

Arthur and White worked well together in shared mutual respect, but they did not pursue a personal friendship with one another outside of The Golden Girls set. Arthur's son, Matthew Saks, later spoke of tension between the two actresses, stating that his mother, "unknowingly carried the attitude that it was fun to have somebody to be angry at...It was almost like Betty became her nemesis, someone she could always roll her eyes about at work." Both actresses had dramatically different training and acting backgrounds; Saks commented on White's habit of breaking the fourth wall to engage and joke with the studio audience during breaks between filming, which Arthur found unprofessional. "Those two couldn't warm up to each other if they were cremated together," co-producer Marsha Posner Williams recalled during a celebration of the series' 40th anniversary in 2025. Williams added that Arthur referred to White as a "cunt" on more than one occasion. In 2011, White stated that she believed it was her "positive attitude" and perky demeanor that got on Arthur's nerves. However, Arthur preferred that all four castmates break together for workday lunch.

=== Pilot ===
The Golden Girls television pilot was filmed on April 17, 1985. In addition to the four ladies, the pilot featured a gay cook/butler named Coco, played by Charles Levin. While taping, the show's writers and producers, as well as the NBC representatives attending, noticed the audible audience response to Estelle Getty's short performance as Sophia. After the pilot was green lit, the producers of The Golden Girls decided to make Getty a regular cast member rather than an occasional guest star. This would mean there wouldn't be enough weekly airtime or dialogue for a regular cast of five. In addition, the writers observed that in many of the proposed scripts, the main interaction between the women occurred in the kitchen while preparing and eating food. They decided that this would be nearly impossible with a live-in cook. In the end it was decided to write out Levin's character.

=== Writing and taping ===
The show was the second television series to be produced by the Walt Disney Company under the Touchstone Television label (and the first one to be successful), and was subsequently distributed by Buena Vista International, Inc. (which holds as the ownership stake in Disney Channel Southeast Asia, now Disney–ABC Television Group). The Golden Girls was shot on videotape in front of a live studio audience.

Creator Susan Harris went on to contribute another four episodes to the first season, but became less involved with the sitcom throughout its run; she continued reading all scripts, however, and remained familiar with most of the storylines. Kathy Speer and Terry Grossman were the first head writers of the series, and wrote for the show's first four seasons. As head writers, Speer and Grossman, along with Mort Nathan and Barry Fanaro, who won an Emmy Award for outstanding writing for the first season, gave general ideas to lower staff writers, and personally wrote a handful of scripts each season.

In 1989, Marc Sotkin, previously a writer on Laverne & Shirley and a producer on another Witt/Thomas series, It's a Living, assumed head writing responsibilities, and guided the show (to varying degrees) during what were its final three seasons. Richard Vaczy and Tracy Gamble, previously writers on 227 and My Two Dads, also assumed the roles of producers and head writers. Beginning in 1990, Marc Cherry served as writer and producer, years before creating Desperate Housewives, which ran on ABC from 2004 to 2012. Mitchell Hurwitz also served as writer for the show in its last two seasons. Hurwitz later created Arrested Development for Fox and later for Netflix.

Cherry commented on read-throughs of the scripts that "generally, if the joke was a good one, the women found a way to make it work the very first time they read it. You have a lot of table reads where the actors will mess it up because they don't understand what the characters are doing, or they misinterpret. But the women were so uniformly brilliant at nailing it the first time... we basically knew that if the women didn't get it right the first time, the joke needed to be replaced." According to Cherry, the writers' room was "a competitive atmosphere. There was a lot of competition to get your words into the script." Writer Christopher Lloyd explained that the usual situation was for all of the more junior writers to be assigned the same scene to write, with the one judged the best version becoming the one chosen. This "created a great deal of stress and competitiveness amongst those of us who weren't in that inner sanctum."

After season three, Arthur had expressed her growing dissatisfaction with the disparaging jokes made about her physical appearance, which were often in the scripts. She expressed that she would not continue if changes were not made, but changes were made and jokes regarding Dorothy's physique appeared less often. Christopher Lloyd later said, "I think that was a mistake we made, to be a little bit insensitive to someone who was an extremely sensitive person... I think we pushed that [the jokes about Arthur's appearance] a little bit far and I think she let it be known she didn't love that."

Estelle Getty's stage fright, which affected her from the beginning of the show, grew worse as the show went on. According to McClanahan, by the end of season three, Getty had significant problems remembering her lines, which was attributed to anxiety. To aid her retention, Getty tried hypnosis, and the show hired an assistant to run lines with her before taping; neither method worked. She took to writing her lines on props at which she could glance easily, like the wicker purse Sophia always carried with her. The cast often had to stay behind after the audience had departed to redo scenes where Getty had flubbed her lines, and although this was at first met with resistance from the producers, cue cards were eventually introduced to help her. Rue McClanahan, who shared a dressing room with Getty, described the severity of Getty's stage fright: "She'd panic. She would start getting under a dark cloud the day before tape day... You could see a big difference in her that day. She'd be walking around like Pig-Pen, under a black cloud. By tape day, she was unreachable. She was just as uptight as a human being could get. When your brain is frozen like that, you can't remember lines." Getty died in 2008, the result of dementia with Lewy bodies. Her co-stars, in an interview, said that her disease had progressed to the point that she was not able to hold conversations with them or recognize them. Her difficulties remembering lines were later thought to be early signs of her dementia. (Getty did not have as many difficulties with this during her subsequent appearances as Sophia on The Golden Palace and Empty Nest.)

During season six, some uncertainty arose over whether Bea Arthur would commit to future seasons, or leave the show once her contract expired, to pursue other projects. Arthur felt the characters had been in every possible scenario, and wanted to end the series while it was still successful. Debbie Reynolds was brought on as a guest star in the season six episode "There Goes the Bride: Part 2" to test her chemistry with the other actresses as a possible replacement for Arthur, but Arthur chose to commit to a seventh and final season.

=== Exterior and interior sets ===
Blanche Devereaux's address was at 6151 Richmond Street in Miami, Florida. In reality, the exterior used for the first three and a half seasons of The Golden Girls was a residence at 245 North Saltair Avenue in Brentwood, Los Angeles. In 1987, a front exterior replica was built in Bay Lake, Florida to be used for filming exterior shots for mid season three and onward. It was part of the backstage studio tour ride at Disney's Hollywood Studios. The structure was identical to the front of the North Saltair Avenue residence, with the exception of the immature landscaping. Over time it sustained hurricane damage (along with the Empty Nest home), leading to Disney's 2003 decision to bulldoze the houses of "Residential Street" and construct its Lights, Motors, Action!: Extreme Stunt Show attraction, later replaced by Star Wars: Galaxy's Edge. In 2020, owners of the original Brentwood home marketed the property for $3 million.

The show's designer, Ed Stephenson, took inspiration from his time living in Florida to design a "Florida look" for The Golden Girls house set. The wooden accents, columns, and doors were painted to mimic bald cypress wood, popular in South Florida homes, with rattan furniture and tropical-printed upholstery chosen for the furniture.

The kitchen set seen on The Golden Girls was originally used on an earlier Witt/Thomas/Harris series, It Takes Two, which aired on ABC from 1982 to 1983. However, the exterior backdrop seen through the kitchen window changed from the view of Chicago high-rises to palm trees and bushes for the Miami setting. Space was limited on the soundstage, so when the kitchen was off camera, it was usually detached from the rest of the set and the space used for something else. The doorway from the living room, with the alcove and baker's shelf just inside, was designed to give the illusion that the actors were walking into and out of the kitchen.

=== Costumes ===
Costume designer Judy Evans created distinctive looks for each of the four actresses to suit their characters' personalities and to reflect the Florida setting. According to Evans, "I wanted a sexy, soft, and flowing look for Rue, a tailored, pulled-together look for Bea, a down-home look for Betty, and comfort for Estelle." Anna Wyckoff of the Costume Designers Guild wrote, "Evans took the direction from the producers to create a vibrant look for the four mature leads, and ran with it...redefining what 'dressing your age' looked like." Many of the characters' outfits were designed by Evans and made especially, but seven to ten costume changes per episode were made between the four actresses, which entailed a great deal of off-the-rack shopping. Evans generally dressed the actresses in expensive pieces and high-quality fabrics, despite the recurring theme that the four characters were struggling with money, because, "The main idea was to make them look good. We didn't want the show to be about four dowdy ladies."

Bea Arthur had a preference for wearing loose-fitting clothing, like slacks and long sweaters, along with sandals, because she hated wearing shoes. She had established this signature look while playing Maude, and Evans honored it in her designs for Dorothy. Much of Arthur's wardrobe was custom-made because at the time, finding off-the-rack clothing that was flattering for a taller woman was difficult. Rue McClanahan had a special clause written into her contract allowing her to keep her costumes, which were mostly custom-made for her, utilising expensive fabrics. Eventually, McClanahan went on to create a clothing line for QVC called "A Touch of Rue", inspired by Blanche, but made with affordable fabrics and practical designs.

== Critical reception ==
The Golden Girls premiered to widespread acclaim, which it maintained throughout its run. On Metacritic, the series has an overall score of 82 out of 100, based on 6 reviews, indicating "universal acclaim".

== Social commentary and politics ==
The Golden Girls dealt with social issues that were considered topical and possibly controversial in the 1980s. Different episodes depict Dorothy dealing with phobias regarding hospitals and heights, first denying her fears and vulnerabilities before openly admitting them and seeking coping mechanisms. Dorothy also reveals she is a former smoker and recovering gambling addict. After briefly engaging in gambling again, she immediately falls into old habits, avoiding social situations and dismissing professional work in order to gamble more. Realizing her problem has resurfaced, she seeks help from Gamblers Anonymous and begins her recovery process anew. When Dorothy sees Blanche in a toxic relationship, the latter defends herself by saying her new boyfriend never physically assaults or hits her. Dorothy then relates her experience with verbal and emotional abuse, arguing that abuse does not need to be physical to cause harm.

During the run of the show, Dorothy repeatedly expresses liberal views but never declares her party affiliation, though she does have a Michael Dukakis bumper sticker (covering a Walter Mondale bumper sticker) on her car. When then-President George H. W. Bush visits Miami, Dorothy intends to angrily confront him regarding education, only to be rendered mute at the shock of actually meeting him. Dorothy shared many of Bea Arthur's political views, who in a 2005 interview remarked, "that's what makes Maude and Dorothy so believable: we have the same viewpoints on how our country should be handled."

Dorothy's strong moral principles brought her into conflict with different people throughout the series, including the school in which she worked. When she refuses to give a lazy student passing grades simply because he is a star athlete, meaning he cannot play football, the school threatens and intimidates her. When the student later plays football anyway and breaks his leg, Dorothy visits him in the hospital, determined to continue teaching him. She reads him A Tale of Two Cities. On some occasions, Dorothy's beliefs and moral judgments are challenged, forcing her to reassess. When her son Mike decides to marry a woman 21 years older than him, Dorothy is concerned about the age difference, but later concedes it is not her business to stop them from marrying. In "Dorothy's Prized Pupil", Dorothy expresses compassion for such as Mario (Mario Lopez), a student who is an undocumented immigrant, offering to help him. When Blanche and Rose warn her that her new friend Barbara Thorndyke seems toxic, narrow-minded and snobbish, Dorothy repeatedly defends the woman, despite her obvious condescending attitudes. However, Dorothy later realizes that her friends are right when Barbara reveals that Sophia's Jewish friend will not be accepted to a "restricted" (i.e. WASP-only or predominantly so) club, whose membership policy Barbara tolerates merely because "they serve a great breakfast and the parking is free".

Multiple episodes of The Golden Girls dealt with LGBT issues and with Dorothy's inclusive attitudes (Bea Arthur herself was openly supportive of the LGBT community). In the second season, Dorothy demonstrates a strong friendship with her friend Jean, who she knows is a lesbian. She consoles Jean following the death of the woman's romantic partner, Pat, and offers her sympathy when Jean later realizes she is developing romantic feelings for a heterosexual woman. In the same story, Dorothy, Sophia, Rose, and Blanche openly discuss homosexuality and accept it, even though some of them don't fully understand it. Likewise, Dorothy openly discusses her brother Phil Petrillo's cross-dressing without ever shaming him or feeling embarrassed that he does so. In the season 3 episode "Strange Bedfellows", the women are present when Gil Kessler, a man running for local office, reveals he is a trans man and had gender reassignment surgery in 1968. Rose is confused about what such surgery involves, but continues to identify Kessler as male. Dorothy is upset, not due to Kessler's revelation but because he decides to drop out of the political race following his revelation (and because she is in a fight with Blanche). Other episodes deal with Blanche coming to terms with her brother being gay and later wishing to marry his partner.

When her mother, Sophia, makes a new friend, Alvin, only for him to not recognize her one-day due to a mental condition (which is later confirmed to be Alzheimer's), Dorothy comforts her mother and they openly discuss fears regarding aging and mental health. One episode involves Sophia being asked by a friend to assist in her suicide, leading her and Dorothy to discuss the matter and whether such action is acceptable.

A two-episode story, "Sick and Tired" in season 5, has Dorothy suffering from extreme exhaustion and recurring illness but finding no cause from medical scans, leading one doctor to suggest it is depression and psychosomatic, while another tells her she's simply older now and must expect such problems. Dorothy persists and finally finds a doctor who diagnoses her with chronic fatigue syndrome. Susan Harris, the show's co-creator, also suffered from the then largely unrecognized condition. The story ends with Dorothy confronting one of the doctors who dismissed her, finding that the man does not recognize her. She remarks on the danger and insensitivity of doctors who do not listen to their patients and muses that she may have been taken more seriously had she been a man.

== Character casting and development ==
Dorothy Zbornak's last name was taken from Kent Zbornak, a friend and colleague of show co-creator and scriptwriter Susan Harris. Kent Zbornak wound up becoming the stage manager on The Golden Girls. From the start, Harris envisioned Dorothy as a sarcastic, authoritarian teacher who would constantly clash with her quick-witted mother. In an interview for the 2003 TV special The Golden Girls: Their Greatest Moments, Bea Arthur said, "Dorothy Zbornak was probably the only sane person on the show. I loved her, she had great humor... She was the steady one. She was the great leveler. She was the great balloon pricker, if you will." The producers were, by their own admission, "picky" about the casting for all the principal parts, deciding to take extra time if needed to find the right actors for each role so the cast would feel balanced and complementary. For Dorothy Zbornak, the show specified they wanted "a Bea Arthur type". Arthur herself was not asked due to an assumption she would not consider returning to a regular television series after spending years as the strongly opinionated lead character of Maude. Maude had been a recurring character on All in the Family, and her popularity in the role led to her spin-off series, which in turn had its own spin-off, Good Times. Brandon Tartikoff had rejected casting Arthur as the lead because she had a low Q Score.

In her show Elaine Stritch at Liberty, Elaine Stritch claimed to have been considered for the role at one point, but that she "blew her audition" by improvising colorful language and so was not cast as Dorothy. In a 2025 panel discussion, casting director Joel Thurm expressed regret toward how Stritch had been treated, noting that Harris had been dead-set on casting Arthur and as a result, the production staff were exceptionally cold, hostile and strict toward Stritch. Stritch fit the "Bea Arthur type" description and had actually played a version of Arthur's character Maude in Nobody's Perfect, a British adaptation of Maude broadcast in 1980 by ITV. The show ran for two years with a total of 14 episodes. Of the 14 episodes, Stritch herself adapted 13 original Maude scripts and co-star Richard Griffiths adapted one.

Following Stritch's auditions, others read for the role. Then, according to Bea Arthur herself, "This is so funny. My agent called me and said, 'What is this? I hear you're doing a new series... Something called Golden Girls.'" Bea Arthur and her agent investigated and discovered that several women had auditioned for a role described as "a Bea Arthur type", and it had led to a rumor that she was herself involved. At the time, Arthur had taken a position as the spokeswoman for Shoppers Drug Mart, a Canadian drugstore chain (a role she would continue concurrently with her role as Dorothy). Arthur then requested to see the script.

According to Arthur in an interview for The Times, "When I was first sent the script for the pilot [of The Golden Girls], I fell in love with it — it was so bright, so witty, so adult. But it never really dawned on me it was about these older women. Apparently, it was presented to a number of producers and they turned it down — 'Who cares about older women?' I guess it was revolutionary because it was the first time older women were shown in an atmosphere where they were well-groomed, well dressed, had active sex lives. Prior to that, when old people were shown on television, you could almost smell them." Despite this, Arthur hesitated to join the cast after learning that the other two leads – the sexually forward Blanche and the sheltered and sometimes naive Rose – were to be played by Rue McClanahan, who had co-starred with her as Vivian Harmon on Maude, and Betty White, known for playing flirtatious, sexually liberated Sue Ann Nivens on The Mary Tyler Moore Show, Arthur believed the show was typecasting both of them, assuming that McClanahan was portraying Rose and White would portray Blanche. The producers asked McClanahan to reach out to Arthur. When she did, Arthur said, "Rue, I'm not interested in playing Maude and Vivian Meet Sue Ann Nivens." McClanahan explained that while that had been the original idea, the plan had changed; she would portray "the vamp" Blanche and White would be playing Rose. Impressed that the producers were subverting expectation rather than type-casting, and after further discussion with McClanahan, Arthur agreed to portray Dorothy Zbornak.

Bea Arthur said that she was fortunate in being allowed to shape her characters in both Maude and The Golden Girls along with the writers. On July 7, 1995, on an episode of the British daytime talk show This Morning, she explained, "In both sitcoms that I did do, we were given... the opportunity of saying, 'No, I don't think I'd say that'... It was really give-and-take between the writers and actors... I was blessed that we had wonderful people." McClanahan similarly recalled that though the actors and writers were kept separate, the actors were given the opportunity to give feedback and request adjustments, something that she, White and Arthur did regularly, while the less experienced Getty largely played the script as it was given to her.

Arthur and the writers worked together to evolve Dorothy's character. Along with her sarcasm and righteous anger, Dorothy was also portrayed as a humble woman who was sometimes insecure about her appearance and whether people wanted to include her or thought of her as fun and interesting. Her divorce, along with previous negative and abusive relationships, sometimes made her insecure about new relationships. The show established that she had phobias of hospitals and heights, but that she worked to overcome these. She also showed addictive habits in regards to smoking and gambling, quitting both. While a fairly liberal woman, on occasion she would reveal conservative views or a fear of new situations and social situations she didn't have experience with before. Due to Bea Arthur's experience as a singer in theatre, Dorothy occasionally showed off her singing talent. While Dorothy could be moralistically judgmental, she also had compassion for people who were earnest in regretting mistakes and harm they had caused.

Along with being a lead on The Golden Girls, Arthur portrayed Dorothy in the spin-off series Empty Nest in an episode entitled "Dumped". The series Empty Nest featured a physician (a friend of Dorothy's) and his two daughters, all of whom lived in a house next door to the cast of The Golden Girls.

=== Working with Estelle Getty ===
Estelle Getty was cast as Dorothy's mother, Sophia Petrillo. Despite being over a year younger than Bea Arthur, Getty was known for being able to play older roles and was further aged for the camera thanks to make-up and a wig. Regarding working with Arthur, Estelle Getty said, "Bea cracks me up the same way that I crack her up. She's one of the brilliant comic minds of our day, she's just that good... I love Bea Arthur like she was my own daughter... I think of Bea very often in a very maternal way."

Arthur told David Levin, "The characters of Dorothy and her mother, played by me and Estelle, I think was one of the great comedic duos that has ever been done. I think it ranks up there with Laurel and Hardy... The absurdity of the love/hate relationship... The difference in size... It was brilliant... The writers were so brilliant... It was a joy coming to work every day... Everyone connected with Golden Girls was not a genius but damn close to it. Including our costume designer... I remember one of my very favorite episodes was when Sophia had entered the two of us in a mother/daughter beauty contest at Shady Pines and for the talent section we did Sonny and Cher's 'I Got You Babe.' And I remember Judy Evans, this brilliant costumer, had little Estelle in it was kind of a furry jacket with a mustache and I had black hair down to my behind... It was fabulous... Every day was so meaningful." In response to their performances as Sophia and Dorothy, both Getty and Arthur won Emmy Awards for Outstanding Lead and Support Actress in a Comedy Series. Along with All in the Family, Will & Grace, and Schitt's Creek, Golden Girls is the only other show in American television where each of the lead actors has won an Emmy.

Arthur remarked that she found it natural to learn that younger viewers were drawn to Golden Girls, particularly due to Dorothy's defiance of her mother and Sophia's defiance of Dorothy and often society. "It was all so anti-establishment, you know, that even kids loved it... They loved the character of the mother who said the most outrageous things."

=== Working with Betty White ===
Arthur held a well-attested unease toward Betty White offstage, a tension that occasionally worked into the show's dialogue between Dorothy and Rose, as the two had similar personalities to their characters. According to Arthur's son Matthew Saks, Arthur's acting benefited from having a legitimate real-life foil to work. White acknowledged in 2011 that Arthur often found her to be a "pain in the neck." Writer Marsha Posner Williams and co-star Rue McClanahan both alleged that Arthur used a much harsher word to describe White. The clearest distinction between the two was in their approaches to acting, as White was prone to interacting with the audience when tape was not rolling, a tactic that the more straightforward Arthur disliked. Sally Struthers, a friend of Arthur's who was not on good terms with White, recalled that Arthur was naturally foul-mouthed and that she and Struthers routinely gossiped about "everyone we ever knew," not necessarily just White.

=== Departure ===
Bea Arthur's contract came up for review after the sixth season, and she decided that the next and seventh season would be her last on the show. She said that while she was grateful for the experience, she wanted to return to live theatre and thought it was best to leave before popularity waned or Dorothy became too predictable to audiences. "I thought, we've hit it, we've really done it. And why hang on... just to keep it running and to go over the same stuff again? It's never going to be as rewarding." Rue McClanahan believed that Arthur felt she didn't have much to do to further Dorothy's development and so felt the role had become stagnant. "I think she just wanted more to do." It was decided that Dorothy's departure in the season finale would be marked by giving her a happy ending with a marriage to "a nice guy" in contrast with the many failed romances audiences had seen her in and with the fact that the show had begun with her recently divorced from a cheating husband. Leslie Nielsen portrayed her new love interest, Lucas, and played practical jokes on the set, providing comic relief to counter the high emotions surrounding Arthur's departure. Arthur admitted that even though she wanted to leave, and was happy that Dorothy would be marrying the "gorgeous" Leslie Nielsen, she was very sad to do so in the end and say goodbye to the cast and crew.

As season 7 began, NBC moved The Golden Girls to a new time slot and ratings suffered, with the show's ranking going from No. 10 to No. 35 that year, the first time the series has ever been outside of the "top ten." This, along with Bea Arthur's departure, led NBC to reconsider if the series could continue without Dorothy. The other three cast members were willing to continue, and so a spin-off sequel series was created for them for CBS, The Golden Palace. In the series, Blanche, Rose and Sophia operate a hotel together after Dorothy has married and left Florida. In the show's first season, Arthur made a guest appearance as Dorothy in a two-episode story, "Seems Like Old Times." The series ended soon afterward and was not picked up for a second season. Betty White said that Bea Arthur's departure was deeply felt in the spin-off. "It became Golden Girls in the Lobby without Bea. And it just doesn't work, it's like taking a leg off a table. Table doesn't balance if you take a leg off of it, you know."

In her 1995 interview with This Morning, Arthur was asked about her departure from The Golden Girls and her return to live theatre. "I started doing sitcom television in 1972. July 5th to be exact... Maude... I spent most of my adult life in that little box [television] and I really felt it was time to get back to one's roots... Not that it wasn't terribly rewarding." When asked about her character Dorothy apparently being the "linchpin" of the show and that her absence may have been why the sequel series The Golden Palace didn't gel for audiences, she conceded this was apparently the observation of some but that she didn't know herself why the series wasn't successful.

In 2013, TV Guide ranked The Golden Girls number 54 on its list of the 60 Best Series of All Time. In 2014, the Writers Guild of America placed the sitcom at number 69 in their list of the "101 Best Written TV Series of All Time." In 2023, Variety ranked The Golden Girls #18 on its list of the 100 greatest TV shows of all time. Terry Tang of the Associated Press reported that the series continues to attract new fans in the 21st century and characterized it as an example of a sitcom that has aged well.

=== Ratings ===
An instant ratings hit, The Golden Girls became an NBC staple on Saturday nights. The show was the anchor of NBC's Saturday line-up, and almost always won its time slot, as ABC and CBS struggled to find shows to compete against it, the most notable being ABC's Lucille Ball sitcom Life with Lucy in the beginning of the 1986–87 season although it aired at 8:00, an hour earlier. The Golden Girls was part of a series of Brandon Tartikoff shows that put an end to NBC's ratings slump, along with The Cosby Show, 227, Night Court, Miami Vice, and L.A. Law.

The show dealt with many controversial issues, such as coming out and same-sex marriage, elder care, homelessness, poverty, HIV/AIDS and discrimination against people with HIV/AIDS, US immigration policy, menopause, sexual harassment, teenage pregnancy, artificial insemination, adultery, bad medical care, sexism, miscegenation and interracial marriage, antisemitism, age discrimination, environmentalism, substance abuse, problem gambling, nuclear war, death, and assisted suicide.

Writer and producer Linda Bloodworth-Thomason created a sitcom with this kind of image as a "four women" show, which became Designing Women on CBS. Designing Women began competing against The Golden Girls.

At the request of Queen Elizabeth the Queen Mother, who was reputedly a big fan, the cast of The Golden Girls performed several skits as their characters in front of her and other members of the British royal family at the 1988 Royal Variety Performance in London.

=== NBC timeslots ===
- Seasons one-six: Saturday at 9:00 pm
- Season seven: Saturday at 8:00 pm

=== Controversial episodes ===
The season 3 episode "Mixed Blessings" was noted as controversial. In it, Dorothy's son Michael (Scott Jacoby) plans to marry a Black woman, Lorraine (Rosalind Cash). In one scene, Blanche and Rose walk out of the kitchen wearing mud masks and Rose says "We're not black." Streaming service Hulu pulled the episode in 2020 due to blackface concerns but, as an article in Vulture pointed out this was not an example of blackface; they were just mud masks. As of 2023, the episode is back streaming on Hulu.

The season 6 episode "Sisters of the Bride" featured Clayton, Blanche's gay brother, celebrating a commitment ceremony with his partner (as same-sex marriage would not be legal in the United States until the early 2000s). Writer Marc Cherry described in a 2025 episode of the Soapy podcast that "if we weren't the first, we were only the second show to do something about gay marriage." Cherry told the podcast interviewers that "they called us up to the office a few days after the episode aired, and they said, 'So you guys are getting death threats'" and that "they literally showed us a letter that was written 'to those f—king Jew producers of Golden Girls.' " As a result of the controversy, Cherry and his then-writing partner Jamie Wooten" had to unlist their telephone numbers.

== Accolades ==
During its original run, The Golden Girls received 68 Emmy nominations, 11 Emmy awards, 4 Golden Globe Awards, and 2 Viewers for Quality Television awards. All the lead actresses won Emmy awards for their role on the show. The Golden Girls is one of four live-action shows, along with All in the Family, Will & Grace, and Schitt's Creek, where all the principal actors have won at least one Emmy.

As a tribute to the success of The Golden Girls, all four actresses were later named Disney Legends as part of the class of 2009.

== Distribution ==
=== Syndication ===
Beginning July 3, 1989, NBC added daytime reruns of the show, replacing long-running Wheel of Fortune (which had moved to CBS) on the NBC schedule at 11:00 am EST; it ran until September 1990. At this time, syndicated reruns began airing, distributed by Buena Vista Television (now Disney–ABC Domestic Television), the syndication arm of Disney, whose Touchstone Television division produced the series.

In March 1997, the Lifetime cable network acquired the exclusive rights to repeat the episodes of The Golden Girls in the US until March 1, 2009. Many episodes were edited to allow more commercials and for content.

Both Hallmark Channel and We TV picked-up the reruns in March 2009. As of February 2013, We TV's rights expired; Viacom purchased the rights and added the series to TV Land (which had carried White's Hot in Cleveland at the time), Logo TV, and (by 2020) CMT.

On February 18, 2026, MeTV announced that they will acquire the rights to the series, returning to broadcast TV for the first time in nearly 30 years. The show debuted on March 16, airing 2 episodes weeknights at 10:00 pm EST, 1 episode Sundays at 6:00 pm EST and in a 2-hour block Sundays from 8:00 pm to 10:00 pm EST.

In Australia, the show has aired weekends on Fox Comedy. As of 2019, every episode is available for streaming on Stan. As of December 1, 2021, every episode was made available to stream on Disney+.

In Canada, Corus Entertainment's digital specialty channel, DejaView, aired reruns of The Golden Girls until 2017. As of September 8, 2021 all 7 seasons of The Golden Girls were made available to stream on Disney+ in Canada.

In Germany, the show began being broadcast in January 1990, only months before the German reunification, by German public broadcaster ARD in the late evening program on their main channel Das Erste. The show was aired as a bilingual broadcast using a two-channel sound system (Zweikanalton). If technically supported by the home television, this system allowed their audience to watch the show either in the dubbed German version (by default) or the original English version. After reruns on different regional channels of the ARD Network, the show later aired on private channels RTL, VOX, Super RTL, Disney Channel and RTLup. While RTL initially chose to cut some scenes for time, some of the gags remain incomprehensible for their broadcast and all subsequent reruns, only to be restored partially for the release of DVD in 2005. As of September 15, 2021, every episode was made available to stream on Disney+ in Germany and Austria.

In Italy, the series aired on Rai Uno (or Rai 1) as Cuori senza età (Ageless Hearts) from 1987 until 1994.

In Israel, the show was broadcast by Israeli Educational Television on its transmission strip on Channel 1, and in 1993, it was moved to IETV's transmission strip on Channel 2 right after it went on air. In February 2024, the whole series was up on the Israeli Disney+.

In Southeast Asia, Rewind Networks began airing reruns of The Golden Girls on its HD channel, HITS, in 2013.

In New Zealand, the series aired on TVNZ and is replayed on public holidays and on Sunday afternoons. It was shown on Jones!.

In the United Kingdom, the series aired on Channel 4, Living and Disney Channel. Another brief run of the show began on 27 April 2020 till summer 2020 on Channel 5, but only showed episodes up to the season-four finale and is returning to Channel 4 starting from early 2022.

In Ireland, the series has been airing on TG4 since 2021.

Every episode of The Golden Girls was made available to stream on Hulu on February 13, 2017.

== Film ==
Forever Golden: A Celebration of The Golden Girls released in select movie theaters across North America via Fathom Events on September 14, 2021, marking the show's 36th anniversary. The film featured five episodes from the show: "The Pilot", "The Flu", "The Way We Met", "Ladies of the Evening" and "Grab That Dough".

== Home media ==
Buena Vista Home Entertainment has released all seven seasons, with edits, of The Golden Girls on DVD in Region 1 and Region 4 with the first four being released in Region 2. On November 9, 2010, the studio released a complete-series box set titled The Golden Girls: 25th Anniversary Complete Collection. The 21-disc collection features all 180 episodes of the series as well as all special features contained on the previously released season sets; it is encased in special collectible packaging, a replica of Sophia's purse. On November 15, 2005, Warner Home Video released The Golden Girls: A Lifetime Intimate Portrait Series on DVD which contains a separate biography of Arthur, White, McClanahan and Getty, revealing each woman's background, rise to stardom and private life, which originally aired on Lifetime network between June 2000 and January 2003.

Title	Release date		
Title	Region 1	Region 2	Region 4
The Complete First Season	November 23, 2004	June 27, 2005	August 17, 2005
The Complete Second Season	May 17, 2005	August 1, 2005	September 21, 2005
The Complete Third Season	November 22, 2005	January 9, 2006	October 1, 2005
The Complete Fourth Season	February 14, 2006	September 1, 2008	December 5, 2007
The Complete Fifth Season	May 9, 2006	TBA	April 2, 2008
The Complete Sixth Season	November 14, 2006	TBA	December 3, 2008
The Complete Seventh Season	February 13, 2007	TBA	March 18, 2009
The Complete Series	November 9, 2010	TBA	November 7, 2018
Four Complete Seasons (Seasons 1–4)	No release	October 26, 2015	No release

== Continuation and spin-offs ==
=== The Golden Palace ===
After the original series ended, White, McClanahan, and Getty reprised their characters in the CBS series The Golden Palace, which featured Rose, Blanche, and Sophia selling their house to buy and run a hotel in Miami. It ran from September 1992 to May 1993 and also starred Cheech Marin and Don Cheadle. Bea Arthur was not a part of the main cast but did guest star in a double episode, reprising her role as Dorothy.

The show never approached the popularity or acclaim of the original, and ranked 57th in the annual ratings. Reportedly, a second season was approved before being cancelled the day before the network announced its 1993–94 schedule.

Lifetime, which held the rights to The Golden Girls at the time, aired reruns of The Golden Palace in the summer of 2005, and again in December of that year. This was the first time since 1993 that The Golden Palace was seen on American television. Until April 2006, Lifetime played the series as a virtual season eight, airing the series in between the conclusion of the final season and the syndicated roll-over to season one.

For White's 100th birthday on January 10, 2022, The Golden Palace began streaming on Hulu.

=== Empty Nest ===
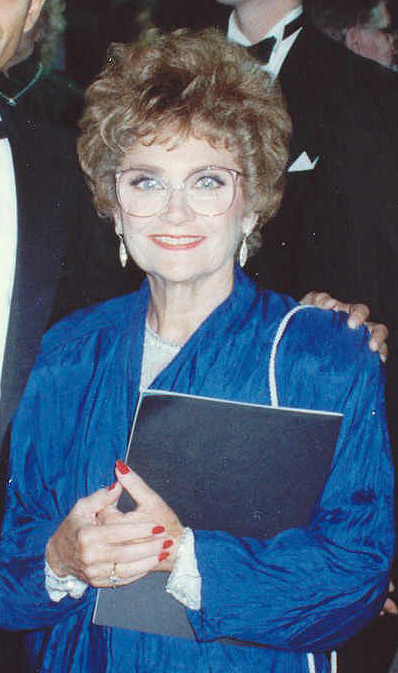
Estelle Getty at the 41st annual Primetime Emmy Awards in 1989

Susan Harris developed a spin-off centering on empty nest syndrome. The initial pilot was aired as the 1987 Golden Girls episode "Empty Nests", and starred Paul Dooley and Rita Moreno as George and Renee Corliss, a married couple living next to the Golden Girls characters, who face empty nest syndrome after their teenaged daughter goes to college. When that idea was not well received, Harris retooled the series as a vehicle for Richard Mulligan, and the following year Empty Nest debuted, starring Mulligan as pediatrician Harry Weston, a widower whose two adult daughters moved back home.

Characters from both shows made occasional crossover guest appearances on the other show, with the four girls guesting on Empty Nest and Mulligan, Dinah Manoff, Kristy McNichol, David Leisure, and Park Overall appearing on The Golden Girls in their Empty Nest roles. After the end of The Golden Palace, Getty joined the cast of Empty Nest, making frequent appearances as Sophia in the show's final two seasons. Mulligan and Manoff were alumni from one of Susan Harris' earlier shows, Soap.

=== Nurses ===
Empty Nest launched its own spin-off in 1991 set in Miami in the same hospital where Dr. Weston worked. The series starred Stephanie Hodge and a set of other young nurses. As one of the few times in television history where three shows from the same producer, set in the same city, aired back-to-back-to-back on the same network, the three shows occasionally took advantage of their unique circumstance to create storylines carrying through all three series, such as "Hurricane Saturday".

Starring actress Hodge left after two seasons, David Rasche joined the cast at the start of the second season, and Loni Anderson was added as the new hospital administrator in the third.

== Adaptations ==
=== Stage ===
The Golden Girls: Live! was an off-Broadway show that opened in the summer of 2003 in New York City at Rose's Turn theater in the West Village, and ran until November of that year. The production ended because the producers failed to secure the rights and received a cease-and-desist order by the creators of the original television show. Featuring an all-male cast in drag, The Golden Girls: Live! consisted of two back-to-back episodes of the sitcom: "Break-In" (season one, episode eight) and "Isn't It Romantic?" (season two, episode five).

The Golden Girls: The Laughs Continue opened with an all-male cast in drag on December 14, 2023, in Los Angeles. The production stars Christopher Kamm, Adam Graber, Ryan Bernier, and Vince Kelley. The play was written by Robert Leleux and directed by Eric Swanson.

The cast of The Golden Girls, Sophia, Dorothy, Blanche, and Rose, have been even further immortalized in two puppet parody shows Thank You For Being A Friend and That Golden Girls Show: A Puppet Parody, both created by Australian screenwriter Thomas Duncan-Watt and producer Jonathan Rockefeller.

=== Animation ===
Golden Girls 3033 is an animated pilot created by Mike Hollingsworth. The pilot takes audio from the sitcom and sets it against a futuristic background inspired by The Jetsons.

=== Books ===
In 2025, The Golden Girls became a cozy mystery series. The first book, Murder by Cheesecake: A Golden Girls Cozy Mystery, by author Rachel Ekstrom Courage, was released April 15, 2025, and it became a New York Times bestseller. A second book, Death on the Lanai, was released on June 2, 2026. The books have also been released as audiobooks, narrated by Yvonne Newman. A companion series, Golden Girls Solve-Along Cozy Mysteries, will launch in 2027. Its first book, Who Ate the Last Slice of Cheesecake, will be published May 11, 2027.

=== International versions ===
- Chile: Los años dorados: In 2015, a Chilean remake called Los Años Dorados (The Golden Years) was produced by UCVTV in agreement with Disney, starring Chilean actresses Gloria Münchmeyer, Carmen Barros, Ana Reeves, and Consuelo Holzapfel, who live their retirement in the city of Viña del Mar. It was a success for the channel and plans were made for a second season in 2016, but that was not produced.
- Israel: Bnot HaZahav ran from 2011 to 2016.
- Greece: In 2008, Greek broadcaster ET1 premiered a Greek remake entitled Chrysa Koritsia (Greek: Xρυσά κορίτσια, Gold[en] Girls), which features the four women in Greece. Each of the characters has been hellenized to suit the culture and modern setting. Names were only slightly changed, but more for cultural reasons, as Sophia (whose first name was unchanged, as it is Greek), Bela (Blanche), Dora (Dorothy), Fifi (Rose), and Panos (Stan). The series began airing in mid-January, and features many similar plots to the original. ET1 aired a rerun of the show in the summer of 2008 and managed to take a place in the top-10 ratings chart, presented by AGB Nielsen Media Research. The Greek edition features Mirka Papakonstantinou as Dora, Dina Konsta as Sofia, Eleni Gerasimidou as Fifi, and Ivonni Maltezou as Bela.
- Netherlands: Golden Girls: A Dutch remake for the RTL 4 network stars Loes Luca as Barbara (Blanche), Beppie Melissen as Els (Dorothy), Cecile Heuer as Milly (Rose), and Pleuni Touw as Toos (Sophia). The show premiered in fall 2012, using essentially the same plots as the American version, along with a Dutch-language version of the original theme song, "Thank You for Being a Friend".
- The Philippines: 50 Carats, O Di Ba? A Philippine version of The Golden Girls aired during the early 1990s by IBC 13 starred Nida Blanca, Charito Solis, and Gloria Romero.
- Russia: Bolshie Devochki: A Russian remake was broadcast on Channel One in 2006, entitled Bolshie Devochki (Russian: Большие Девочки), which in English can literally be translated to: Grown Girls. The series featured renowned Russian actresses Galina Petrova as Irina (Dorothy), Olga Ostroumova as Nadejda (Blanche), Valentina Telechkina as Margarita (Rose), and Elena Millioti as Sofya (Sophia). However, the concept never caught on with Russian viewers and the show was canceled after only 32 episodes.
- Spain: Juntas, pero no revueltas/Las chicas de oro: In 1996, TVE launched a Spanish remake entitled Juntas pero no revueltas (Together, but not mixed) with Mercedes Sampietro as Julia (Dorothy), Mónica Randall as Nuri (Blanche), Kiti Manver as Rosa (Rose), and Amparo Baró as Benigna (Sophia). Low ratings made it disappear after one season. In 2010, another remake with the title Las chicas de oro (The Golden Girls) was announced, again on TVE, this time produced by José Luis Moreno and with Concha Velasco as Doroti (Dorothy), Carmen Maura as Rosa (Rose), Lola Herrera as Blanca (Blanche), and Alicia Hermida as Sofía (Sophia). The series premiered on September 13, 2010, with success. However, after only 26 episodes, the series was eventually discontinued after the end of the first season after receiving generally bad reviews and following dropping ratings.
- Portugal: Queridas e Maduras: In July 1995, RTP premiered Queridas e Maduras (in English, Dear Mature Girls) a Portuguese version of the American sitcom. The show featured renowned Portuguese actresses Catarina Avelar as Edite (Dorothy), Amélia Videira as Inês (Rose), Lia Gama as Salomé (Blanche) and the veteran actress Luísa Barbosa as Aparecida (Sophia). The Portuguese version got two seasons, the first in 1995 and the second in 1996, adapting episode plots from the first two seasons of the original series.
- Turkey: Altın Kızlar. In 2009, broadcaster ATV premiered Altın Kızlar (literally translated to English as "The Golden Girls"). It was produced by Play Prodüksiyon. Rather than residing in Miami, the women shared a condo in residential part of Beyoğlu. As in other foreign adaptations, it featured well-known local actresses. The key roles were filled by Fatma Girik as Safıye (the 'Sophia' character), Hülya Koçyiğit as İsmet ('Dorothy'), Nevra Serezli as Gönül ('Blanche') and Türkan Şoray as Inci ('Rose'). The show lasted only one episode, consisting of story lines from two of the original American series: "The Engagement" (Season 1, Episode 1) and "The Triangle" (Season 1, Episode 5).
- United Kingdom: Brighton Belles: In 1993, ITV premiered Brighton Belles, a British version of the American sitcom. The show, starring Sheila Hancock, Wendy Craig, Sheila Gish, and Jean Boht, was nearly identical to Girls except for character name changes and actor portrayals. The 10-episode series was canceled after six weeks due to low ratings, with the final four episodes airing more than a year later.

== Restaurant ==
In 2017, a Golden Girls-themed eatery, Rue la Rue Cafe owned by Rue McClanahan's close friend Michael La Rue, who inherited many of the star's personal belongings and in turn decorated the restaurant with them, opened in the Washington Heights section of the New York City borough of Manhattan. The eatery closed in November 2017 after less than a year of operation.
