= Quinn Cummings =

American writer, inventor and former child actress

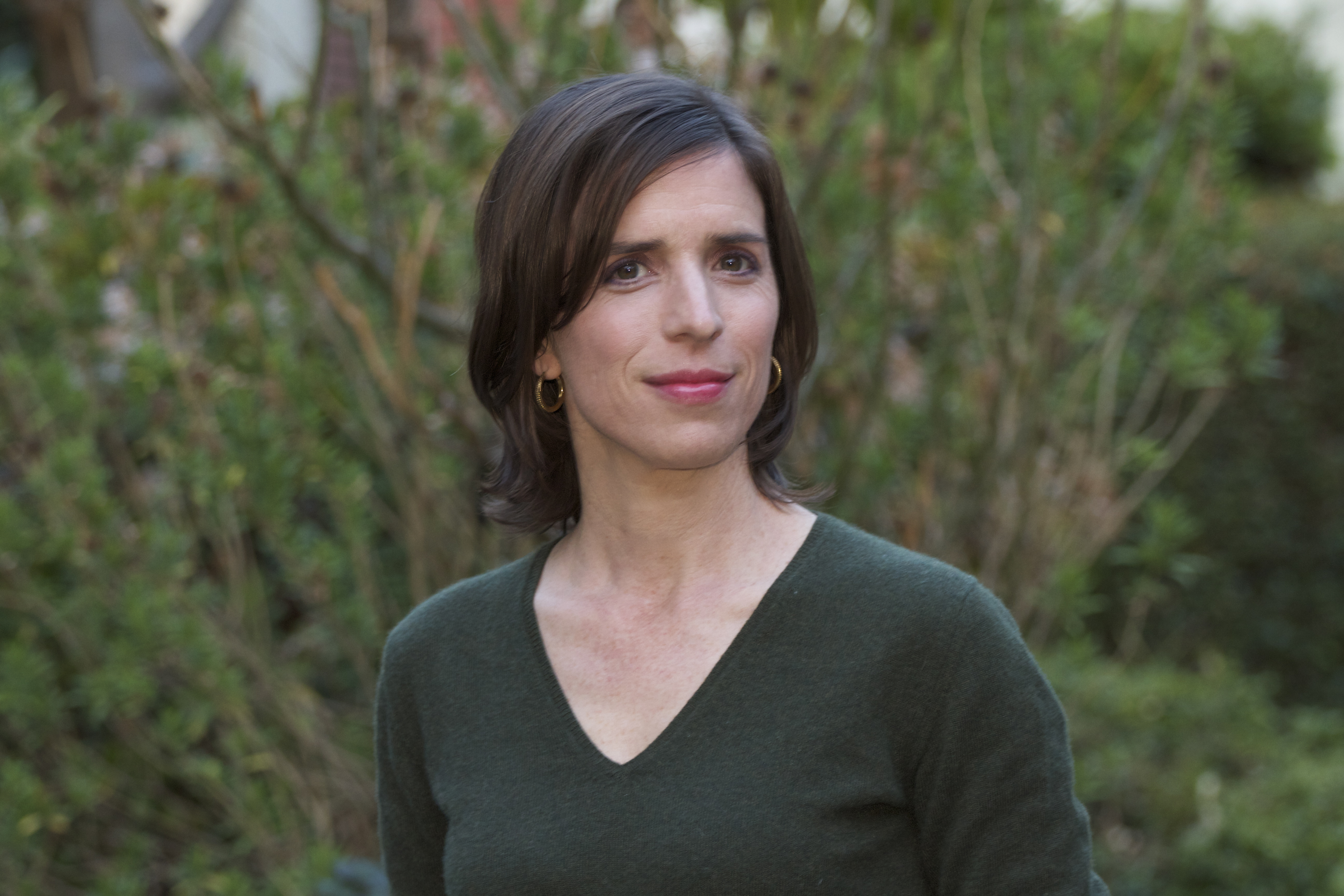
- Quinn Cummings in 2015
- Born: Quinn L. Cummings; Los Angeles, California, U.S.
- Education: University of California, Los Angeles
- Occupations: Author, humorist, actress, inventor, entrepreneur
- Years active: 1975–1992
- Partner: Don DiPietro
- Children: 1

Quinn L. Cummings is an American entrepreneur, author, humorist, inventor and former actress.

Cummings came to prominence as a child actor, playing Lucy McFadden in Neil Simon's The Goodbye Girl, for which she was nominated for an Academy Award for Best Supporting Actress, one of the youngest people to ever be nominated for an Academy Award. She was also known for her recurring role as Annie Cooper on the television series Family. Since quitting acting, Cummings has become an entrepreneur, and has authored several books.

== Early life ==
Cummings was born in Los Angeles.

== Career ==
=== Film and television ===
Cummings began her career after being discovered by cinematographer James Wong Howe. She soon began landing roles in numerous television commercials, eventually winning the role of Marsha Mason's daughter, Lucy McFadden, in the 1977 film The Goodbye Girl. Cummings's performance was nominated for an Academy Award for Best Supporting Actress and a Golden Globe Award for Best Supporting Actress – Motion Picture.

In 1978, Cummings had a recurring role on the drama series Family. In 1985, Cummings appeared in the short-lived ABC sitcom Hail to the Chief as the daughter of the first female president of the United States, played by Patty Duke. During the late 1980s, Cummings acted occasionally and worked as a casting agent. She attended UCLA for two years and had a stint recruiting writers to publish short stories online. Her last acting role was a 1992 episode of Evening Shade.

=== Other ventures ===
Inspired by the birth of her daughter, Cummings created the HipHugger, a sling-type device for carrying a baby.

In February 2005, Cummings started a blog, The QC Report, which discussed the ironies of modern life from the point of view of a career mother in her 30s.

=== Books and essays ===
Cummings's first book, Notes from the Underwire: Adventures from My Awkward and Lovely Life, was published in July 2009. Her second book, The Year of Learning Dangerously, which explores the current state of home schooling in America, was published by Perigee Books in August 2012. Pet Sounds, a collection of humorous stories relating to animals and pet ownership was released in the summer of 2013. In 2019, she launched a podcast, Quinn Cummings Gives Bad Advice, in which she responds to listener questions on any advice topic, highlighting the fact that she has no particular knowledge or expertise in the subject being raised.

In 2021, Cummings self-published a book, Modest Blessings for Modern Times. The book is a humorous collection of scenarios where the reader might feel "modestly" grateful if such a scenario happened, such as "You shower after a teenage boy, and yet there is still hot water." Cummings has donated a portion of proceeds from the book to various non-profit organizations.

In the wake of the #MeToo scandal, Cummings made several statements and wrote an essay in 2017 about sexual harassment abuse in Hollywood, particularly abuse of children in the industry.

== Personal life ==
In 2000, Cummings gave birth to a daughter, Anneke DiPietro, by her boyfriend Donald DiPietro.

== Filmography ==
- The Goodbye Girl (1977) as Lucy McFadden
- Listen to Me (1989) as Susan Hooper

=== Television ===
- Big Eddie (Unknown episodes, 1975) as Ginger Smith
- Jeremiah of Jacob's Neck (1976) as Tracy Rankin
- The Six Million Dollar Man (1 episode, 1976) as Elise
- Night Drive (1977) as Nancy
- Visions (1 episode, 1977) as Daughter Bitsy
- Intimate Strangers (1977) as Peggy Halston
- Starsky and Hutch (1 episode, 1978) as Toni McDermott
- Baretta (1 episode, 1978) as Unknown Role
- CBS Library (1 episode – The Incredible Book Escape, 1980) as P.J.
- Family (36 episodes, 1978–1980) as Annie Cooper
- The Babysitter (1980) as Tara Benedict
- Darkroom (1 episode, 1981) as Didi
- Grandpa, Will You Run with Me? (1983) as herself
- Remington Steele (1 episode, 1984) as Minor Descoine
- Hail to the Chief (Unknown episodes, 1985) as Lucy Mansfield
- The Love Boat (1 episode, 1986) as Anny
- Blossom (1 episode, 1991) as Millie
- Evening Shade (1 episode, 1992) as Shirley

== Bibliography ==
- Notes from the Underwire: Adventures from My Awkward and Lovely Life (2009)
- The Year of Learning Dangerously (2012)
- Pet Sounds (2013)
- Modest Blessings for Modern Times (2021)

== Awards and nominations ==
Academy Award
Nominated: Best Actress in a Supporting Role, The Goodbye Girl (1978)

Golden Globe
Nominated: Best Motion Picture Actress in a Supporting Role, The Goodbye Girl (1978)

Young Artist Award
Nominated: Best Juvenile Actress in a TV Series or Special, Family (1980)
Won: Best Young Actress in a Television Series, Family (1981)
Nominated: Best Young Actress in a Movie Made for Television, Grandpa, Will You Run with Me? (1984)
