= One Big Family (TV series) =

- Genre: Comedy
- Starring: Danny Thomas; Kim Gillingham; Anastasia Fielding; Michael DeLuise; Alison McMillan; Gabriel Damon; Anthony Starke
- Composer: George Tipton
- Country of origin: United States
- Original language: English
- No. of seasons: 1
- No. of episodes: 25

Production
- Executive producers: Paul Junger Witt; Tony Thomas; David Pollock; Elias Davis
- Running time: 30 minutes
- Production companies: Lorimar-Telepictures; Witt/Thomas Productions

Original release
- Network: Syndication
- Release: September 27, 1986 – May 23, 1987

One Big Family is an American sitcom television series. The series stars Danny Thomas, Kim Gillingham, Anastasia Fielding, Michael DeLuise, Alison McMillan, Gabriel Damon and Anthony Starke. The series aired in syndication from September 27, 1986, to May 23, 1987.

== Plot ==
Thomas plays Jake Hatton, a retired comedian in Seattle, who helps raise his nieces and nephews following the deaths of their parents.

== Cast ==
- Danny Thomas as Jake Hatton
- Kim Gillingham as Jan Hatton
- Anastasia Fielding as Marianne Hatton
- Michael DeLuise as Brian Hatton
- Alison McMillan as Kate Hatton
- Gabriel Damon as Roger Hatton
- Anthony Starke as Don Hatton

== Episodes ==
No.	Title	Directed by	Written by	Original release date
1	"Roger Runs Away"	Jeff Chambers	Arnold Margolin	September 27, 1986
2	"Image Breaker"	David Steinberg	Karin Babbitt	October 4, 1986
3	"Jake's Party"	Gary Brown	Jay Folb	October 11, 1986
4	"Jake's Commitment"	David Steinberg	Jay Folb	October 18, 1986
5	"The New House"	David Steinberg	Unknown	October 25, 1986
6	"Talent Night"	Gary Brown	Elias Davis & David Pollock	November 1, 1986
7	"The Matchmaker"	Gary Brown	Unknown	November 8, 1986
8	"Family Vacation"	David Steinberg	Sam Bobrick	November 15, 1986
9	"Kate's Friend"	Gary Brown	Unknown	November 22, 1986
10	"The Charged Battery"	Terry Hughes	Elias Davis & David Pollock	December 6, 1986
11	"The Odd Ball Game"	Gary Brown	Jay Folb	December 20, 1986
12	"Stagestruck"	Jeff Chambers	Elias Davis & David Pollock	January 3, 1987
13	"Jake the Beachcomber"	Gary Brown	Jay Folb	January 10, 1987
14	"Joy to the Hattons"	David Steinberg	Arnold Margolin	January 17, 1987
15	"Operation, Collins"	Bob Sweeney	Jay Folb	January 31, 1987
16	"Kate's Dates"	Jeff Chambers	Arnold Margolin	February 7, 1987
17	"The Big Bust"	Jeff Chambers	Arnold Margolin	February 14, 1987
18	"The Essay"	Gary Brown	Daniel Palladino	February 21, 1987
19	"The Tutor"	Doug Smart	Arnold Margolin	February 28, 1987
20	"Dog Daze"	Bob Sweeney	Sam Bobrick	March 14, 1987
21	"Biting the Hand"	Bob Sweeney	Hank Bradford	April 18, 1987
22	"Old Times"	Jeff Chambers	Unknown	May 2, 1987
23	"Brian's Law"	Doug Smart	Karin Babbitt	May 9, 1987
24	"The Clip Show"	Jeff Chambers	Daniel Palladino	May 16, 1987
25	"The Big Split"	Jeff Chambers	Sam Bobrick	May 23, 1987
