= Loves Me, Loves Me Not =

- Promotional photo for Loves Me, Loves Me Not, showing Susan Dey as Jane Benson and Kenneth Gilman as Dick Phillips
- Genre: Sitcom
- Created by: Susan Harris
- Starring: Susan Dey; Kenneth Gilman; Art Metrano; Phyllis Glick
- Country of origin: United States
- Original language: English
- No. of seasons: 1
- No. of episodes: 6

Production
- Executive producer: Susan Harris
- Producers: Paul Junger Witt; Tony Thomas; Susan Dey
- Running time: 30 minutes
- Production companies: Witt/Thomas/Harris Productions; 20th Century Fox Television

Original release
- Network: CBS
- Release: March 20 – April 27, 1977

Loves Me, Loves Me Not is an American sitcom starring Susan Dey and Kenneth Gilman, which centered on a young couple who had just started dating. It aired on CBS from March 20 to April 27, 1977.

== Cast ==
- Susan Dey as Jane Benson
- Kenneth "Kip" Gilman as Dick Phillips
- Art Metrano as Tom
- Phyllis Glick as Sue

== Synopsis ==
Dick Phillips is an awkward but earnest and hardworking newspaper reporter who has fallen head-over-heels for Jane Benson, a single California schoolteacher. Both are in their early 20s. They begin to date, but are very unsure of the relationship: Jane is not as sure as Dick is of the relationship's romantic potential – in fact, at first she wants nothing to do with him – and is reluctant to reciprocate his affection, and Dick is not sure where he stands with Jane.

Tom is Dick's boss and best friend. Sue is Tom's wife, and she befriends Jane after Dick and Jane start dating.

== Production ==
Loves Me, Loves Me Not was Susan Dey's first weekly television series after The Partridge Family came to an end in 1974. It was rushed into production after CBS, deciding to produce a show about young adults to tap into the market for such shows that ABC had had so much mid-1970s success with in Happy Days and Laverne and Shirley, made a last-minute decision to buy six episodes for broadcast in the spring of 1977. Susan Harris, who created the show, wrote its episodes very quickly and filming similarly was rushed, wrapping up in January 1977. Dey said during the show's run that the tight schedule reduced the amount of depth that she and Gilman could put into their characters, although she thought that the depth would come if the show succeeded and more episodes were produced.

Paul Junger Witt and Tony Thomas produced the show, and Jay Sandrich was among the episode directors.

Six episodes were produced, but CBS cancelled the show after the last of them aired.

== Broadcast history ==
Loves Me, Loves Me Not premiered on CBS on Sunday, March 20, 1977, at 10:30 p.m. It then moved to its regular time slot, Wednesdays at 8:30 p.m., on March 23, remaining there until its sixth and final episode was broadcast on April 27, 1977.

== Episodes ==
Season #	Episode #	Title	Plot/Notes	Original air date
1	1	Pilot	Trying to impress Jane, Dick makes an ass of himself by clumsily sinking a friend's boat, tumbling through a plate glass window, and smashing a glass coffee table.	March 20, 1977
1	2	"Walter Comes Back"	Jane's ex-fiancé Walter returns, making Dick feel very insecure.	March 23, 1977
1	3	"Jane's Parents"	Jane's persnickety, perfectionist parents come to visit, and Dick is scheduled to meet them.	March 30, 1977
1	4	"Tom's Separation"	Tom and Sue separate, leading Dick to conclude that romance can fail.	April 6, 1977
1	5	"In the Woods"	Dick and Jane go on a wilderness trip.	April 13, 1977
1	6	"Dick's Novel"	Dick takes a leave of absence from work to finish writing a novel.	April 27, 1977
