= Susan Harris =

American former television comedy writer and producer

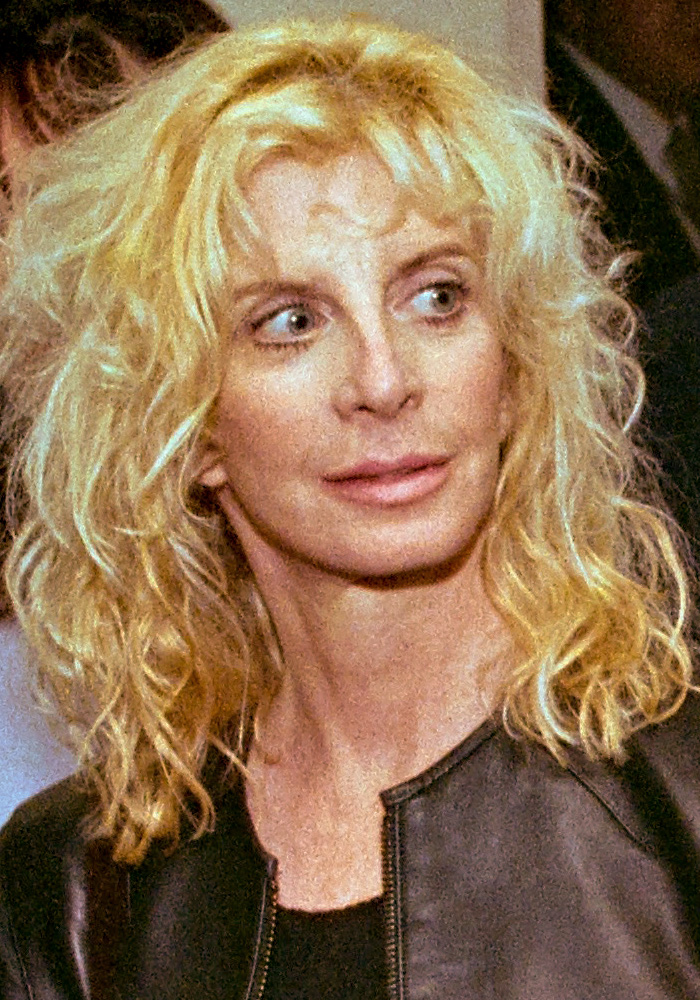
- Harris in 1999
- Born: Susan Spivak; October 28, 1940 (age 86); Mount Vernon, New York, U.S.
- Occupations: Producer, writer
- Years active: 1970–1999
- Spouses: Berkeley Harris (m. 1965; div. 1969) Paul Junger Witt (m. 1983; died 2018)
- Children: 2, including Sam
- Relatives: Marion Segal Freed (step-sister)

Susan Harris (née Spivak; born October 28, 1940) is an American former television writer and producer who created the Emmy Award–winning sitcoms Soap (1977–1981) and The Golden Girls (1985–1992). Between 1975 and 1998, Harris was one of the most prolific television writers, creating 13 comedy series. In 2011, she was inducted into the Television Hall of Fame.

== Career ==
The first script Harris sold was for Then Came Bronson. She then wrote for Love, American Style, All in the Family, The Partridge Family and the TV adaptation of Neil Simon's Barefoot in the Park. Her abortion episode for the Bea Arthur–starring series Maude in the 1970s received great acclaim. She worked with Arthur again in the 1980s when Arthur took one of the lead roles in The Golden Girls.

Harris created many television series: Fay, Soap, Loves Me, Loves Me Not, Benson, It Takes Two, The Golden Girls, Empty Nest, Nurses, Good & Evil, The Golden Palace and The Secret Lives of Men. Her most financially successful show was The Golden Girls.

Harris was diagnosed with chronic fatigue syndrome and her symptoms affected her ability to participate in the production of The Golden Girls. In an episode of that show titled "Sick and Tired" (1989), Harris wrote some of her struggles into the storyline where Bea Arthur's character Dorothy Zbornak was diagnosed with chronic fatigue syndrome. It later turned out Harris had an adrenal issue but she wrote the episode as "my revenge script for all the people out there who had a disease like that".

Harris formed the production company Witt/Thomas/Harris Productions with Paul Junger Witt and Tony Thomas.

== Awards and honors ==
She was honored with the Writers' Guild's Paddy Chayefsky Award in 2005 and inducted into the Television Academy Hall of Fame in 2011.

== Personal life ==
Harris was born to a Jewish family in Mount Vernon, New York. She was married from 1965 to 1969 to actor Berkeley Harris; the couple's son is podcast host Sam Harris. Harris married television producer Paul Junger Witt on September 18, 1983; he co-produced all the shows she created. He died in 2018. Harris lives in suburban Los Angeles.

== Credits ==
Year	Title	Role	Notes
1970	Then Came Bronson	writer	Episode: "Then Came Bronson"
1970	Barefoot in the Park	writer	Episode: "You'll Never Walk Alone"
1971–1973	All in the Family	writer	3 episodes
1971	The Courtship of Eddie's Father	writer	Episode: "To Catch a Thief"
1971	The Good Life	writer	3 episodes
1972–1973	The Partridge Family	writer	3 episodes
1972–1973	Maude	writer	4 episodes
1973	Love, American Style	writer	2 episodes
1975–1976	Fay	creator	10 episodes
1977	Loves Me, Loves Me Not	creator	6 episodes
1977–1981	Soap	creator, executive producer	87 episodes Nominated – Primetime Emmy Award for Outstanding Comedy Series (1978, 1980–81)
1979–1986	Benson	creator, executive producer	158 episodes
1980–1981	I'm a Big Girl Now	creator, executive producer	19 episodes
1982–1983	It Takes Two	creator, executive producer	22 episodes Nominated – Humanitas Prize for 30 Minute Network or Syndicated Television
1985	Hail to the Chief	creator, executive producer	7 episodes
1985–1992	The Golden Girls	creator, executive producer	177 episodes Primetime Emmy Award for Outstanding Comedy Series (1987); Nominated – Primetime Emmy Award for Outstanding Comedy Series (1988–1991); Nominated – Primetime Emmy Award for Outstanding Writing for a Comedy Series (1986)
1988–1995	Empty Nest	creator, executive producer	170 episodes
1991	Good & Evil	creator, executive producer	6 episodes
1991–1994	Nurses	creator, executive producer	68 episodes
1992–1993	The Golden Palace	creator, executive producer	24 episodes
1998–1999	The Secret Lives of Men	creator, executive producer	13 episodes
