= Hail to the Chief (TV series) =

- Created by: Susan Harris
- Directed by: J.D. Lobue
- Starring: Patty Duke; Richard Paul; Ted Bessell; Glynn Turman; Joel Brooks; John Vernon; Quinn Cummings; Ricky Paull Goldin; Taliesin Jaffe; Dick Shawn; Herschel Bernardi
- Composer: George Aliceson Tipton
- Country of origin: United States
- Original language: English
- No. of seasons: 1
- No. of episodes: 7

Production
- Running time: 30 minutes (per episode)
- Production company: Witt/Thomas/Harris Productions

Original release
- Network: ABC
- Release: April 9 – May 21, 1985

Hail to the Chief is an American sitcom that aired on ABC from April 9 to May 21, 1985. It centered on the President of the United States, portrayed by Patty Duke. The series was created by Susan Harris, and was produced by Witt/Thomas/Harris Productions. It featured one of the few recurring gay characters in a 1980s television series (Randy, the Secret Service Agent portrayed by Joel Brooks).

== Synopsis ==
Hail to the Chief is similar in style to the TV sitcom, Soap (from the same producers as this series), in that it was a comedy with open-ended storylines that parodied a soap opera. Patty Duke had the starring role as the President, Julia Mansfield. The show focused on President Mansfield's attempt at balancing her political career with raising her family.

== Cast and characters ==
Starring

- Patty Duke as President Julia Mansfield
- Ted Bessell as First Gentleman Oliver Mansfield

Also starring

- Herschel Bernardi as Secretary of State Helmut Luger
- Joel Brooks as Randy
- Quinn Cummings as Lucy Mansfield
- Murray Hamilton as Senator Sam Cotton
- Taliesin Jaffe as Willy Mansfield
- Dick Shawn as Ivan Zolotov
- Maxine Stuart as Lenore
- Glynn Turman as United Nations Ambassador LaRue Hawkes
- Ricky Paull Goldin as Doug Mansfield (eps. 2–7)
- Chick Vennera as Raoul (eps. 2–5)
- Raechel Donahue as Announcer (eps. 2–7)

Recurring guest stars

- John Vernon as General Hannibal Stryker
- Richard Paul as Reverend Billy Joe Bickerstaff
- Jonna Lee as Muffin Stryker

== Episodes ==
No.	Title	Directed by	Written by	Original release date	Viewers (millions)
1	"Episode One"	J.D. Lobue	Susan Harris	April 9, 1985	20.0
President Julia Mansfield is told that Brower, an Air Force general gone crazy, has taken control of a launch command center and will launch a preemptive nuclear strike against the USSR unless his demands are met. Julie calls Soviet Premier Zolotov to warn him, and is told that the Soviet Union will have no choice but to retaliate if she can't stop Brower. Later, Julia's husband Oliver confesses all of his past affairs to her, and she walks out on him.
2	"Episode Two"	J.D. Lobue	Susan Harris	April 16, 1985	15.0
General Stryker tells Head of Security Helmut Luger that Stryker's daughter is pregnant and that Luger is responsible, unaware that Julia's son Doug is really the father. Corrupt televangelist Rev. Billy Joe Bickerstaff plots to have Julia impeached. Oliver's mistress Darlene threatens to ruin him when he tries to end the affair; in an attempt to make up for all his past mistakes, Oliver promises God that he will save the world by stopping Brower.
3	"Episode Three"	J.D. Lobue	Story by : Paul Junger Witt & Tony Thomas; Teleplay by : Kathy Speer, Terry Grossman, Barry Fanaro, Mort Nathan & Susan Harris	April 23, 1985	14.8
Oliver confronts Brower and is shot in the process; later, Julia tells a comatose Oliver that all is forgiven. Meanwhile, Ivan Zolotov, head of the KGB and the premier's twin brother, arrives at the Russian embassy and instructs his agent Darlene to stay by Oliver's side so she can continue to get information.
4	"Episode Four"	J.D. Lobue	Story by : Paul Junger Witt & Tony Thomas; Teleplay by : Kathy Speer, Terry Grossman, Barry Fanaro & Mort Nathan	April 30, 1985	13.7
Oliver recovers, believing that Heaven has given him a second chance. His daughter Lucy is sleeping with Raoul the butler, but Raoul says that he can't commit to a serious relationship until his people in Contrapointa, South America, are free. Darlene visits Oliver in the hospital. Stryker tells Luger to marry his daughter Muffin, under threat of death. Rev. Billy Joe finds two wealthy oil barons, Clovis and Lamar, who are willing to help him with his plan.
5	"Episode Five"	J.D. Lobue	Story by : Paul Junger Witt & Tony Thomas; Teleplay by : Kathy Speer, Terry Grossman, Barry Fanaro & Mort Nathan	May 7, 1985	14.0
Oliver, who is now home from the hospital, still can't make love to Julia because he feels guilty about cheating on her again. Clovis and Lamar find some dirt on the President's personal accountant, Irving Metzman (George Wyner), and force him to help them plot against Julia. Oliver breaks it off with Darlene but not before having "one last time together," unaware that the KGB is secretly filming the whole thing.
6	"Episode Six"	J.D. Lobue	Story by : Paul Junger Witt & Tony Thomas; Teleplay by : Kathy Speer, Terry Grossman, Barry Fanaro & Mort Nathan	May 14, 1985	12.3
Clovis and Lamar give Metzman some money to secretly put into government contracts, in the names of Julia's family, as personal investments to make it appear that she gave her family inside information. They then tell Rev. Billy Joe to attack Julia on his talk show. Ivan Zolotov confronts Oliver, letting him know that if he doesn't do what Ivan says the world will see the film of him and a Russian agent.
7	"Episode Seven"	J.D. Lobue	Story by : Paul Junger Witt & Tony Thomas; Teleplay by : Kathy Speer, Terry Grossman, Barry Fanaro & Mort Nathan	May 21, 1985	12.2
Raoul leaves for South America and Lucy follows after him. Luger has dinner with Stryker's family and, after seeing how crazy they are, decides to marry Muffin if for no other reason than to get her out of the house. Ivan gives Oliver a list of demands. Later Ivan admits to a colleague that if Oliver doesn't come through for them he has a better plan – a plan to put a Soviet agent in the White House, at which point he introduces his newest secret agent: Rev. Billy Joe!

== Reception ==
=== Critical response ===
John J. O'Connor of The New York Times wrote in his review: "Hail to the Chief features Patty Duke as the first female President of the United States surrounded by assorted misfits in a format that is intended to be, as they like to say, zany and irreverent. This one's sour, to say the least. [...] As for Hail to the Chief, there hasn't been anything so furiously wacky on prime-time television since Soap got a broad cross-section of protest groups worked up almost a decade ago - even before the show went on air. Not surprisingly, both series come out of Witt/Thomas/Harris Productions. Susan Harris is the creator and writer. Paul Junger Witt and Tony Thomas are the producers. It is perhaps a sign of the times that Hail to the Chief, which goes several kinky steps beyond the outrageousness of Soap, is making its debut without so much as a raised eyebrow, even though the advertisements for the equal opportunity offender promise that you'll say, I thought they couldn't do that on TV."

=== Ratings ===
Hail to the Chief, which featured Patty Duke as the President, got off to a very good start, attracting 32% of the available viewers and winning its time period for the April 9 premiere. But it drew only 24% the following week, 23% for the third episode and 22% for the fourth.

=== Cancellation ===
Hail to the Chief was canceled in May 1985 after seven episodes. ABC continued to air repeats of the series through July 20, 1985.
