= Full Moon Over Miami =

Television event

- Created by: Susan Harris
- Written by: Kevin Abbott, Tom Whedon (The Golden Girls); Peter Gallay (Empty Nest); Bob Underwood (Nurses)
- Directed by: Lex Passaris (The Golden Girls); Doug Smart (Empty Nest); Terry Hughes (Nurses)
- Starring: Beatrice Arthur; Betty White; Rue McClanahan; Estelle Getty; Harold Gould; Marius Weyers; Richard Mulligan; Kristy McNichol; Dinah Manoff; David Leisure; Park Overall; Jay Johnson; Stephanie Hodge; Arnetia Walker; Mary Jo Keenen; Ada Maris; Kip Gilman; Carlos Lacámara; Jeff Altman; Florence Stanley; Tim Thomerson
- Country of origin: United States
- Original language: English

Production
- Running time: 120 minutes

Original release
- Network: NBC
- Release: February 29, 1992

Related
- Hurricane Saturday

Full Moon Over Miami is a one-off programming block of a three-way, two-hour crossover event on NBC which involved three television sitcoms created by Susan Harris: The Golden Girls, Empty Nest and Nurses. The event depicts a fictional full moon on Leap Day storming into the storylines of the three series set in Miami, Florida. The episodes aired back-to-back on Saturday, February 29, 1992, from 8:00 to 10:00 p.m. EST.

The Full Moon Over Miami block is similar to the previous NBC Hurricane Saturday block of November 9, 1991, when a fictional hurricane was woven into the storylines of the same three series.

== Plot ==
The event begins on The Golden Girls one-hour episode "A Midwinter Night's Dream" (season 7, episodes 20 and 21) as a full moon on Leap Day falls upon the household which prompts Blanche to host a men-only Moonlight Madness Party and strange happenings abound: all the men are attracted to Dorothy while none are attracted to Blanche; Rose proposes to Miles after winning a free honeymoon to Paris and Sophia has fun with a witch's hex cast on Dorothy and goes through all the necessary steps to try and release her from it. The full moon and festivities prompt other strange happenings: Dorothy and Miles find themselves sharing a passionate kiss, and Blanche's necklace disappears while she necks with a British man named Derek. Carol and Barbara Weston (from Empty Nest) are featured in the episode: Barbara shows up to confront Sophia, who attempted to cause a fight between her and Carol to break a curse, and Carol invites herself to Blanche's party.

The event continues on the Empty Nest episode "Dr. Weston and Mr. Hyde" (season 4, episode 20) as Dr. Harry Weston throws out his back and goes off his rocker after taking the wrong medicine that makes him act very strange. Barbara thinks their dog Dreyfuss may be masquerading as a repairman – after all, she's never seen the two of them together. Rose Nylund (from The Golden Girls) drops in on the Westons for some advice about romance.

The event ends on the Nurses episode "Moon Over Miami" (season 1, episode 20) as Charlie Dietz (from Empty Nest) and Blanche Devereaux (from The Golden Girls), both affected by the full moon, turn up at the hospital: Blanche seeks Dr. Riskin's advice about a tonic for her sexual dry spell and a desperate Sandy considers dating Charlie. Greg encourages his co-workers to pursue their romantic fantasies and an astronaut arrives with a lump on his head.

== Cast ==
The Golden Girls	Empty Nest	Nurses
Beatrice Arthur as Dorothy Zbornak; Betty White as Rose Nylund; Rue McClanahan as Blanche Devereaux; Estelle Getty as Sophia Petrillo; Harold Gould as Miles Webber; Marius Weyers as Derek; Neal Lerner as the Rabbi; Special Guests: Dinah Manoff as Carol Weston, Kristy McNichol as Barbara Weston	Richard Mulligan as Dr. Harry Weston; Dinah Manoff as Carol Weston; Kristy McNichol as Barbara Weston; David Leisure as Charley Dietz; Park Overall as Laverne Todd; Jay Johnson as George, Myra, Donald; Chuck McCann as Red; Special Guest: Betty White as Rose Nylund	Stephanie Hodge as Nurse Sandy Miller; Arnetia Walker as Nurse Annie Roland; Mary Jo Keenen as Nurse Julie Milbury; Jeff Altman as Greg Vincent; Ada Maris as Gina Cuevas; Kip Gilman as Dr. Hank Kaplan; Carlos Lacámara as Paco Ortiz; Florence Stanley as Dr. Riskin; Tim Thomerson as Col. Calvin Carlton; Special Guest: Rue McClanahan as Blanche Devereaux and David Leisure as Charley Dietz

== See also ==
- Hurricane Saturday – an earlier crossover event involving three NBC sitcoms: The Golden Girls, Empty Nest and Nurses
- Night of the Hurricane – a similar crossover event involving three Fox animated series: Family Guy, American Dad! and The Cleveland Show
