= Hurricane Saturday =

1991 television event

- Created by: Susan Harris
- Written by: Marc Sotkin, Mitchell Hurwitz (The Golden Girls); Arnie Kogen (Empty Nest); Bruce Ferber (Nurses)
- Directed by: Lex Passaris (The Golden Girls); Steve Zuckerman (Empty Nest); Andy Cadiff (Nurses)
- Starring: Beatrice Arthur; Betty White; Rue McClanahan; Estelle Getty; Herbert Edelman; Richard Mulligan; Kristy McNichol; Dinah Manoff; David Leisure; Park Overall; Ann Guilbert; Stephanie Hodge; Arnetia Walker; Mary Jo Keenen; Ada Maris; Kip Gilman; Carlos Lacámara; Jeff Altman
- Country of origin: United States
- Original language: English

Production
- Running time: 120 minutes
- Production companies: Witt/Thomas/Harris Productions; Touchstone Television

Original release
- Network: NBC
- Release: November 9, 1991

Related
- Full Moon Over Miami

Hurricane Saturday is a one-off programming block of a three-way, two-hour crossover event on NBC which involved three television sitcoms created by Susan Harris: The Golden Girls, Empty Nest and Nurses. The event depicts a fictional hurricane storming into the storylines of the three series set in Miami, Florida. The episodes aired back-to-back on Saturday, November 9, 1991 from 8:00 to 10:00 p.m. EST.

== Plot ==
The event begins on The Golden Girls one-hour episode "The Monkey Show" (season 7, episodes 8 and 9) as a hurricane threatens Miami, Dorothy discovers that ex-husband Stan is "moving on" with her sister Gloria, while Blanche and Rose host a telethon to save a lighthouse. Dorothy later catches Gloria with Stan in her bed, then learns that Sophia pushed Stan and Gloria together. As the storm intensifies, Dorothy and Sophia get into an argument and Sophia goes out into the hurricane. Carol Weston (from Empty Nest) is featured in the second part of the episode on a date with Stan's psychiatrist Dr. Halperin when he is called to the girls' house to help Stan with a problem.

The event continues on the Empty Nest episode "Windy" (season 4, episode 8) as Dr. Harry Weston and his daughters, Carol and Barbara, prepare to move to a new house when the hurricane hits and brings back a lot of memories for them. Meanwhile, Laverne's mother-in-law visits and Sophia Petrillo (from The Golden Girls) stops by to warn the Westons about the impending hurricane.

The event ends on the Nurses episode "Begone with the Wind" (season 1, episode 9) as chaos breaks out at the hospital during the hurricane – the kitchen is flooded, the phones are out and the roads are closed. When Rose Nylund (from The Golden Girls) shows up to help, she is immediately stuck with Julie and the duo are assigned to gathering food from the patients – food that they later give to Laverne Todd (from Empty Nest) for the pediatrics ward. When the news arrives that the roof collapsed in a burning building, Annie fears that her husband, a fireman, may have been killed; Sandy runs into a man (whom she dumped) with a broken leg; Hank and Gina get trapped in an elevator and share a romantic moment; two rival gangs start a knife-fight in front of the nurses' station (and threaten Rose) so it's Paco to the rescue.

== Cast ==
The Golden Girls	Empty Nest	Nurses
Beatrice Arthur as Dorothy Zbornak; Betty White as Rose Nylund; Rue McClanahan as Blanche Devereaux; Estelle Getty as Sophia Petrillo; Herbert Edelman as Stan Zbornak; Dena Dietrich as Gloria Petrillo; Bill Dana as Angelo; Steve Landesberg as Dr. Halperin; Special Guest: Dinah Manoff as Carol Weston	Richard Mulligan as Dr. Harry Weston; Dinah Manoff as Carol Weston; Kristy McNichol as Barbara Weston; David Leisure as Charley Dietz; Park Overall as Laverne Todd; Ann Guilbert as Mama Todd; Special Guest: Estelle Getty as Sophia Petrillo	Stephanie Hodge as Nurse Sandy Miller; Arnetia Walker as Nurse Annie Roland; Mary Jo Keenen as Nurse Julie Milbury; Jeff Altman as Greg Vincent; Ada Maris as Gina Cuevas; Kip Gilman as Dr. Hank Kaplan; Carlos Lacámara as Paco Ortiz; Special Guest: Betty White as Rose Nylund and Park Overall as Laverne Todd

== Episodes ==
No. overall	No. in season	Title	Directed by	Written by	Original release date
162	8	"The Monkey Show"	Lex Passaris	Mitchell Hurwitz and Marc Sotkin	November 9, 1991
163	9	"The Monkey Show"	Lex Passaris	Mitchell Hurwitz and Marc Sotkin	November 9, 1991
As a hurricane threatens Miami, Dorothy's newly penniless sister, Gloria, visits and sleeps with Stan. Dorothy becomes furious when she finds out later that Sophia pushed Gloria and Stan together. When she confronts Sophia, they have a fight and Sophia angrily walks out into the hurricane. Blanche and Rose hold a telethon to save a local historic lighthouse.

No. overall	No. in season	Title	Directed by	Written by	Original release date
78	8	"Windy"	Steve Zuckerman	Arnie Kogen	November 9, 1991
Dr. Harry Weston and his daughters, Carol and Barbara, prepare to move to a new house when the hurricane hits and brings back a lot of memories for them. Meanwhile, Laverne's mother-in-law visits.

No. overall	No. in season	Title	Directed by	Written by	Original release date
9	9	"Begone with the Wind"	Andy Cadiff	Bruce Ferber	November 9, 1991
Chaos breaks out in the hospital during a hurricane – the kitchen's flooded, the phones are out, and the roads are closed. So when Rose Nyland shows up to help, she's immediately stuck with Julie and the duo are assigned to gathering food from the patients – food that they later give to Laverne for the pediatrics ward. When the news arrives that the roof collapses in a burning building, Annie fears that her husband, a fireman, may have been killed. Sandy runs into a man with a broken leg, whom she dumped. Hank and Gina get trapped in an elevator and share a romantic moment.

== See also ==
- Full Moon Over Miami – another crossover event involving three NBC sitcoms: The Golden Girls, Empty Nest and Nurses
- Night of the Hurricane – a similar crossover event involving three Fox animated series: Family Guy, American Dad! and The Cleveland Show
- Cartoon Network Invaded – a similar crossover event involving five Cartoon Network animated series: Foster's Home for Imaginary Friends, Ed, Edd n Eddy My Gym Partner's a Monkey Camp Lazlo and The Grim Adventures of Billy & Mandy
