= The Rovers Comedy House =

- Genre: Comedy variety show
- Directed by: Michael Watt
- Country of origin: Canada
- Original language: English
- No. of seasons: 1
- No. of episodes: 7

Production
- Producer: Ken Gibson
- Production location: Vancouver
- Running time: 30 minutes

Original release
- Network: CBC Television
- Release: 8 January – 19 February 1981

The Rovers Comedy House is a Canadian variety show that aired on CBC Television in 1981.

== Premise ==
The Irish Rovers, who identified as The Rovers in the early 1980s, hosted this Vancouver-produced music and comedy variety show. George Millar of the group likened the program to an "Irish Hee-Haw." It was backed by CBC Television after The Rovers starred in a highly rated October 1980 broadcast. The program was produced in Vancouver by Ken Gibson and directed by Michael Watt. Irish singer Jimmy Kennedy regularly portrayed a bartender on the series.

== Scheduling ==
This half-hour program was originally broadcast on Thursdays at 10:30 p.m. from 8 January to 19 February 1981. When a NABET strike affected the network that spring, the program was rebroadcast from 9 May to 13 June on Saturdays at 6:30 p.m., It was rebroadcast again in 1982, on Mondays at 7:30 p.m. from 24 to 31 May.

== Episodes and guests ==
- 8 January 1981 - Oscar Brand
- 15 January 1981 - Tommy Makem and Liam Clancy
- 22 January 1981 - Andy Stewart
- 29 January 1981 - Dennis Day
- 5 February 1981 - Jim Stafford
- 12 February 1981 - Bruno Gerussi, Tommy Makem and Liam Clancy
- 19 February 1981 - Bob Gibson, Shay Duffin
