= My Talk Show =

- Starring: Cynthia Stevenson; Stephanie Hodge; Debra McGrath; David Packer; Ron James
- Country of origin: United States
- Original language: English
- No. of episodes: 59

Production
- Executive producers: Bob Tischler; Andrew Alexander
- Running time: 22-24 minutes
- Production companies: Second City Entertainment; Diving Duck Ltd. Imagine Television; MCA TV

Original release
- Network: Syndicated
- Release: September 1990 – March 1991

My Talk Show is a parody talk/variety television program that ran daily in first-run syndication from September 1990 to March 1991 in the United States and Canada. The series was produced by Second City Entertainment and Diving Duck Ltd., Imagine Entertainment and MCA Television.

== Details ==
The series, set in the fictional town of Derby, Wisconsin ("The Hat Capital of the World"), featured a local talk show aptly titled My Talk Show, which was created by housewife and talk television fan Jennifer Bass, which aired on cable access. The program became a hit with viewers, leading to the series being picked up for syndication. The shows' setting took place in Bass' home with the garage being converted into an area for the studio audience, since the local television station in Bass' home town (possibly Milwaukee, since a channel 65 was circled as the station in the credits that showed a newspaper TV listings that also featured actual TV channels from Madison, Rockford and Chicago) could not accommodate any space for the production, so a satellite van and cameras were bought over to help tape the show for the airing.

However, despite Bass' attempt to host a talk show (attempt being the operative word, and at times awkward to the point that she had to even include the audience to help move things along, like asking an audience member to disregard the introduction paper he was asked to read and just proceed with welcoming the host), she would be accompanied by best friend and next door neighbor Angela Davenport, who also doubled as her sidekick, her brother-in-law Marty Dissler, Bucky Fergus, the town's multi-tasked city employee, her in-house organist (and "my old school nurse", as pointed out by Jennifer) Mrs. Battle and other Derby residents, especially when it came to the guests who were scheduled to appear on the show. Midway through the series' run, Bass would be replaced by rival Anne-Marie Snelling (who previously made a habit of bursting in unexpectedly), owner and star of the Top Hat Dinner Theater, who had been jealous of Jennifer hosting a talk show from the beginning, and D.A. Young, who replaced Mrs. Battle as the house musician. However, Anne-Marie also had the same problems as Jennifer when others showed up to disrupt the taping.

== Production ==
The series was inspired in some ways by Fernwood 2 Night, which was set in the fictional town of Fernwood, Ohio, and also used the same premise involving midwestern American television programming but it also had some elements borrowed from SCTV as well, since some of the cast members were also Canadian. But the concept (the home doubling as a studio and other elements) was actually borrowed from another program, Tea With Michael Raye, a local cable access program that ran from 1985 to 2010 in the Los Angeles area. Raye was approached at first by the producers to bring his program to syndication, but the producers decided to go in a different direction instead, after the deal fell through.

However, the series had trouble in attracting viewers due to the stations that aired it in late nights (especially in later hours among network affiliated stations), resulting in MCA ending production on the show by December 1990. Michael Patrick King (who would go on to create CBS's 2 Broke Girls many years later) was among the writers for the series, while Colin Mochrie (Debra McGrath's husband) did recurring appearances in several episodes.

== Reviews ==
Ken Tucker of Entertainment Weekly gave the series a B+, praising Stevenson's performance as "Remarkable — a resourceful actress who does a subtle, funny job of portraying someone who's charming but awkward, a little bit flustered on-camera," while commenting that "My Talk Show may be gimmicky, but it's an amusing, well-thought-out gimmick."

== Cast ==
- Cynthia Stevenson as Jennifer Bass
- Stephanie Hodge as Angela Davenport
- Debra McGrath Anne Marie Snelling (McGrath also doubled as writer on the show)
- David Packer as Marty Dissler
- Ron James as Bucky Fergus
- Betsy Townsend as Valarie Christie
- Josephine Hinds as Mrs. Battle
- D.A. Young as himself
