= City (TV series) =

American television situation comedy

- Created by: Paul Haggis
- Directed by: Howard Storm
- Starring: Valerie Harper; Todd Susman; Mary Jo Keenen; Sam Lloyd; Tyra Ferrell; James Lorinz; Liz Torres; LuAnne Ponce; Stephen Lee; Shay Duffin; Rodney Ueno (pilot only)
- Theme music composer: Jeff Levin; Chris Many
- Composer: Jeff Jones
- Country of origin: United States
- Original language: English
- No. of seasons: 1
- No. of episodes: 13

Production
- Executive producers: Paul Haggis; Tony Cacciotti; Jonathan Estrin; Shelley List
- Producers: Ronald E. Frazier; Howard Storm
- Production locations: CBS-MTM Studios; Studio City, California
- Camera setup: Multi-camera
- Running time: 30 minutes
- Production companies: CBS Entertainment Productions; MTM Enterprises; A.V. & Paul Haggis Productions

Original release
- Network: CBS
- Release: January 29 – June 8, 1990

City is an American sitcom television series aired on CBS from January 29 to June 8, 1990. It was a new starring vehicle for Valerie Harper, which went into development not long after she and husband Tony Cacciotti won their lawsuit against Lorimar-Telepictures over her dismissal from her NBC sitcom Valerie (which continued without her as The Hogan Family). City was created by Paul Haggis, and like the previous series was produced by Cacciotti.

== Synopsis ==
Liz Gianni is the city manager of an unnamed city. In her line of work came dealings with the all-too-realistic but sometimes lighthearted issues of the modern-day city, from budget cuts to bureaucratic and political corruption, and the socioeconomic travails of inner-city life. Despite the turmoil that often ensued because of these problems, Liz focused on them with much exuberance, with a little kookiness thrown in, which ultimately made this a return to the type of character that first brought Harper fame on The Mary Tyler Moore Show and Rhoda in the early 1970s. Liz's breezy, Amazonian mentality played more to her advantage at home, where she had to constantly keep up with—-and fret over—-her rapidly maturing 19-year-old daughter Penny. Liz and Penny's frantic repertoire and sweet "mother-daughter" moments, filled with witty dialogue, was the other central base of the show. Liz oversaw a multi-ethnic staff of crazies and eccentrics. Roger Barnett was the assistant city manager who spends most of his time betting on sports and trying to sell a worn-out racehorse he owns. Anna-Maria Batista is the tough Cuban purchasing agent whose most obvious character trait was pronouncing "yep" as "jep". Wanda Jenkins was the sarcastic black secretary, who often discussed how she did not want her young son to turn out like his father, a composer of classical music who actually made very little money. She meets Gloria Elgis, the city social coordinator, a stereotypically beautiful airhead spoiled by her wealthy family; Lance Armstrong, the creepy statistician; and Victor Sloboda, a dumb security guard, who in one episode thought a bandit had stolen the entire supply of White-Out for use in processing records for illegal immigrants. His solution to the problem: painting his entire body in correction fluid in order to "keep his eyes" on the supply! Liz and the gang all answered to Ken Resnick, the totally powerless, monumentally rotten Deputy Mayor. Running the newsstand counter was Sean, an acerbic Irishman. Chuck, an aggressive Asian mail clerk, appeared in the pilot episode.

== Cast ==
- Valerie Harper as Liz Gianni
- Todd Susman as Roger Barnett
- Mary Jo Keenen as Gloria Elgis
- Sam Lloyd as Lance Armstrong
- Tyra Ferrell as Wanda Jenkins
- James Lorinz as Victor Sloboda
- Liz Torres as Anna-Maria Batista
- LuAnne Ponce as Penny Gianni
- Stephen Lee as Ken Resnick
- Shay Duffin as Sean
- Andy Dick as Sam
- Tony Hale as Fred
- Oliver Platt as Jonathan

== Ratings and scheduling ==
On January 29, 1990, the series cracked the Nielsen Top 10. The show kept up this performance through February sweeps, but the early success did not last long. Audiences diminished over the next few months, and although the series pulled respectable numbers at the end of its inaugural season that April, CBS passed on giving City a second season. From January until April, the show aired in the plum time slot of Mondays at 8:30/7:30c, between freshman hit Major Dad and sophomore hit Murphy Brown. CBS then pulled the show for May sweeps, during which time the series was cancelled. City reappeared on Fridays at 8:30/7:30c in June, where it aired three remaining original episodes before leaving the air for good.

== Unauthorized use ==
Despite its short run, the pilot episode continued to be seen by many, through their participation in product and consumer research. Research Systems Corporation, which ran the public invitation-only conventions known as The New Television Preview, had acquired selected copies of the series for showings at their public events, which were falsely passed off, along with actual unaired network pilots, as a test preview for a new series being considered for nationwide broadcast.

== Episodes ==
Every episode of the series was directed by Howard Storm.

No.	Title	Written by	Original release date	Prod. code	US viewers (millions)
1	"Pilot"	Paul Haggis	January 29, 1990	1413	20.2
Liz solves an emergency: a development project levels a cemetery, causing caskets to go sliding into neighboring backyards.
2	"Family Business"	Jonathan Prince & Josh Goldstein	February 5, 1990	9001	17.1
Ken feels that Liz is indebted to him after he fires the mail clerk and gives the job to her daughter Penny.
3	"Another One Died on the Steps Last Night"	Paul Haggis	February 12, 1990	9002	14.8
A homeless saxophone man has died near City Hall overnight, leaving personal effects indicating he was a man Liz knew in high school.
4	"The Miracle at City Hall"	Stephen Nathan & Paul Price	February 19, 1990	9003	15.7
Although he uses a wheelchair, a new employee's greater disability is his attitude.
5	"Your Park or Mine"	Aubrey Tadman & Gordon Mitchell	February 26, 1990	9004	16.9
Liz finds herself attracted to a charming councilman named Gene Whalen (Bruce Davison) with whom she's having a political feud.
6	"The Big Leak"	Tom Spezialy & Alan Cross	March 12, 1990	9005	13.2
Ken's diversion of rec-center funds to his own pocket drives Liz to leak the story to the press, but Ken gets wind of the scoop and orders Liz to find the source.
7	"You Can't Bite City Hall"	Glen Merzer	March 19, 1990	9006	13.2
Anna-Maria is held hostage by Penny's new boyfriend (Robert Petkoff), an animal-rights activist who is protesting the selling of pound animals for research.
8	"Unfinished Business"	Kathy Slevin	April 2, 1990	9007	13.1
The ghost of Liz's late husband throws in his two cents on her relationship with councilman Gene Whalen (Bruce Davison).
9	"Love Among the Ruins"	Story by : Paul Haggis; Teleplay by : Alan Cross & Tom Spezialy	April 9, 1990	9009	14.8
An emergency practice drill forces the staff to stay in the building, but everyone believes it might be the real thing.
10	"Oil and Water"	Kathy Slevin & Glen Merzer	April 16, 1990	9011	11.8
A defective oil tanker, owned by Babette Croquette (Zsa Zsa Gabor), the head of Babette Cosmetics, is leaking vast quantities of oil in the river, but she refuses to pay any cleanup costs.
11	"Seems Like Old Times"	Paul Price & Stephen Nathan	May 12, 1990	9012	4.9
A confused former city manager (Estelle Getty) returns to City Hall after 31 years and tries to take charge of a library project.
12	"With a Song in Your Heart and a Knife in Your Back"	Paul Haggis	June 1, 1990	9013	6.0
When Anna-Maria's husband is released from a Cuban prison, he arrives announcing he's married someone else.
13	"Just a Passing Dad"	Jennifer Heath & Amy Sherman	June 8, 1990	9015	5.8
Liz is reunited with her estranged father (Alan Young), but she suspects he's shown up again only because he wants something from her.
