= Chinatown Connection =

- Directed by: Jean-Paul Ouellette
- Screenplay by: Joseph Berry
- Produced by: Michael Emerson
- Starring: Bruce Ly; Lee Majors II; Art Camacho; Brinke Stevens; John M. Jackson; Fitz Houston
- Cinematography: Jack Anderson
- Edited by: Skip Williams
- Music by: Chris Caswell
- Production companies: Esseff / Arpaia Productions; Shapiro Glickenhaus
- Release date: June 1, 1990
- Running time: 94 minutes
- Country: United States

Chinatown Connection is a martial arts action film directed by Jean-Paul Ouellette released on June 1, 1990. It stars Bruce Ly, Lee Majors II, Art Camacho, Brinke Stevens and Fitz Houston. Two police officers lead a team to stop poison laced narcotics from getting on the streets.

== Plot ==
The film stars Bruce Ly as Lieutenant John Chan and Lee Majors II as Detective Warren Houston. John has the job of reforming violent police officers. He has to team up with a cop Houston who is somewhat trigger happy. For a reason that defies explanation, drug dealers are selling poisoned cocaine. They have to work together to find the source of cocaine that has been laced with cyanide. Their quest takes them to where the evidence points to, a secret organization which is called The Taipan. They are faced with the task of taking this organization on. Tony North who is the #1 man of the cartel boss is the man responsible for the drugs being poisoned. Along with their heavily armed assault team, they bring down the powerful organization that was behind the narcotics being sold.

== Production ==
One of the executives in the production company for the film, Esseff/Arpaia Productions was involved with a company that made and sold mozzarella cheese. The bundles of cheese were used as stand ins for the packages of drugs. This was their second film, the first being the sci-fi film, R.O.T.O.R..

=== Releases ===
It was released on VHS by South-gate Entertainment in 1990. The DVD version was released in Australia through Flashback Entertainment in or around 2000.

== Reception ==
The review given by Fist of B-List was a low one and recommended it only for Art Camacho completists and those who like the East-meets-West reluctant partner dynamic. It noted Fitz Houston's performance in the film and referred to him as a cross between Predator-era Carl Weathers with muscles and great polo shirts and Norman Smiley, a former pro-wrestler. Comeuppance Reviews said that in spite of the amateurish qualities, there was a lot to like about the movie. It was ideal for action fans who don't take themselves too seriously.

== Cast ==
- Art Camacho as Estes
- Susan Frailey as Dawson
- William Ghent as Hong
- Paul Gunning as Mike
- Fitz Houston as Tony North
- John M. Jackson as P.C. Pete
- Bruce Ly as John Chan
- Pat McCormick as Flynn
- Lee Majors II as Detective Warren Houston
- Scott Richards
- Brinke Stevens as Missy

== Crew ==
- Director ... Jean-Paul Ouellette
- Editing ... Skip Williams, Karen D. Joseph (associate editor)
- Music ... Chris Caswell
- Producer ... Michael Emerson
- Screenwriter ... Joseph Berry
- Sound ... Itzhak Magal
- Sound recording engineer ... Itzhak Magal

== Production and distribution etc ==
- Production Co ... Bcd Productions, Esseff / Arpaia Productions
