= Television Preview =

- Company type: Division
- Parent: RSC the Quality Measurement Company
- Website: televisionpreview.com

Television Preview (also known as "New TV Preview") is a market research company that purports to test pilots of new television shows while actually looking for audience's reactions to commercials presented in a "home-like" atmosphere between breaks in these shows. Based in Evansville, Indiana, Television Preview is a division of RSC the Quality Measurement Company, a member of the ArsGroup. Although Television Preview takes no money from viewers, participants are misled about the nature of the survey in which they are participating. The company is not associated with any actual television producers and the "pilots" they preview are years old. Viewers are instead asked to rate the commercials they see. Also, under the guise of selecting prizes they'd like to win in a drawing, viewers choose their "favorites" from pages of pictures of consumer products.

== The process ==
Television Preview randomly sends out invitations and tickets to specific screenings, usually held in hotel conference rooms. The invitation contains text, such as that shown below, insinuating that the viewer will help decide what will be featured on television's next fall lineup:

You have been selected to participate in a survey whose findings will directly influence what you see on television in the future.

You have been selected to evaluate not-yet-released television material that is being considered for nationwide broadcast.

You have been selected to help represent the television viewing preferences of the entire country.

Instead, viewers are shown old television pilots that were never picked up. They are asked to give a thumbs-up or thumbs-down style rating, and then fill out pages of questionnaires about their purchasing preferences, brands they like, products they are likely to use, and so forth.

=== The programs ===
The programs can vary from screening to screening, but most often they seem to be two shows: a 1997 drama called Soulmates featuring Kim Raver, and a comedy called City starring Valerie Harper. City was a short-lived show from 1990. Audience members are either told that Valerie Harper is looking to make a comeback, and wants viewers to judge her likability, or that screenwriter Paul Haggis, who wrote the show, wants to retool it for next fall, but needs viewer's opinions on its feasibility first. Other attendees have reported being shown the pilot of Dads, a comedy show from 1997 starring C. Thomas Howell and Steven Eckholdt.

== Associated companies ==
Within a few business days after the viewings, most participants receive phone calls come from California-based company Datascension, in which participants are asked additional questions about the presentation. The company has been known to make frequent, repeated calls, in the event no one at the participant's number answers, or if they reach an answering machine.
