= Vickilyn Reynolds =

American actress

- Reynolds in Sugar and Spice (1990)
- Born: June 2, 1955 (age 71); Philadelphia, Pennsylvania
- Occupations: Actress, singer

Vickilyn Reynolds (born June 2, 1955 in Philadelphia, Pennsylvania) is an American film and television actress and singer.

== Formative years ==
Born on June 2, 1955, in Philadelphia, Pennsylvania, Reynolds is a Philadelphia performing arts school graduate and a member of the Sigma Gamma Rho sorority. She and her brother, Ron Richardson, grew up watching musicals, films and the Philadelphia area's annual Miss America pageants. He convinced her to choose a career the arts instead of nursing, and later went on himself to win the 1985 Tony Award for best supporting actor in a musical for his performance in Big River. Their older brother, the Rev. W. Franklyn Richardson, became pastor of the Grace Baptist Church in Mount Vernon, New York.

Their father worked in the meat-packing industry; their mother operated a beauty salon from their home for thirty years.

== Career ==
Reynolds first appeared on television in 1987 where she appeared on Kate & Allie, the following year (1988) she had appeared in two films, Crossing Delancey and I'm Gonna Git You Sucka. She also appeared in the movie Friday as Smokey's mother Joann.

In 1990, she was cast in a new CBS television series, Sugar and Spice, 2 sisters living together to raising two orphaned teens.

In 1998, she appeared in the Joseph Papp Public Theater/New York Shakespeare Festival production of Bring in ‘Da Noise, Bring in ‘Da Funk. Cast in the Broadway production of Smoky Joe's Cafe, she subsequently performed in a solo, cabaret-style appearance at The Cinegrill in Hollywood in August 1999.

In 2000, Reynolds appeared in the TheatreWorks production of John Henry Redwood's play, The Old Settler, at the Lucie Stern Theatre in Palo Alto, California. In 2003, she was cast in a television commercial for the Saturn Corporation.

Reynolds has recently appeared on American Dreams in the episode "Beyond the Wire". She last appeared on television in 2005 where she played a talk show host in the film When Do We Eat?. Reynolds has also appeared on 227, a television show.

Further expanding her range, Reynolds wrote the music and words of Hattie McDaniel: What I Need You to Know, and then starred in the leading role of McDaniel, who was the first African-American to win an Oscar. The musical was booked at multiple theatres across the United States between 2008 and 2018, including the National Black Theatre in Manhattan, the Hudson Backstage Theatre in Santa Monica, California, and the Cowell Theater in San Francisco.

== Filmography ==
- 2005 When Do We Eat? as Talk Show Host
- 2004 American Dreams (TV series)
- 2003 Leprechaun: Back 2 tha Hood (V) as Doria
- 2002 Felicity (TV series) as Nurse Jones
- 2001 That's My Bush! (TV series) as Miss Clea #3
- 2001 The Parkers (TV series) as Stephanie
- 2001 Flossin as Bobbie
- 1998 Primary Colors as Amalee
- 1995 The John Larroquette Show (TV series) as Woman
- 1995 Vampire in Brooklyn as Mrs. Brown
- 1995 Friday as Joann
- 1994 Murder Between Friends (Television)
- 1993 Thea (TV series)
- 1993 Addams Family Values as Forceps Nurse
- 1992 South Central as Mrs. Manchester, Willie's Wife
- 1992 Coopersmith (Television)
- 1991 Great Performances (TV series) as LaWanda
- 1990 Almost an Angel as Nancy, Bank Customer #1
- 1990 Polly: Comin' Home! (Television)
- 1990 Sugar and Spice (TV series) as Vickilyn Fontaine
- 1989 The War of the Roses as Nancy, Oliver's Secretary
- 1989 Polly (Television) as Mrs. Tarbell
- 1989 Dad as CCU Nurse
- 1989 The Fabulous Baker Boys as Bad Singer
- 1989 227 (TV series) as Ranger Granger
- 1988 I'm Gonna Git You Sucka as Sadie
- 1988 Crossing Delancey as Woman In Sauna
- 1987 Kate & Allie (TV series) as Gift Wrap Clerk
