= Sugar and Spice (American TV series) =

1990 American sitcom

- Reynolds, Devine, and Anderson in a promotional picture for the series
- Genre: Sitcom
- Created by: Katherine Green; Irma Kalish; Stephen Neigher; Gina Wendkos
- Starring: Vickilyn Reynolds; Loretta Devine; LaVerne Anderson; Dana Hill; Stephanie Hodge
- Theme music composer: Leslie Pearl; Paul Solovay; Susan Spiegel-Solovay
- Composer: Jonathan Wolff
- Country of origin: United States
- Original language: English
- No. of seasons: 1
- No. of episodes: 7

Production
- Executive producer: Irma Kalish
- Producers: Michael Loman; Gina Wendkos; Roxie Wenk Evans
- Cinematography: David Johnson
- Camera setup: Leland Gray
- Running time: 30 minutes
- Production companies: ELP Communications; Columbia Pictures Television

Original release
- Network: CBS
- Release: March 30 – May 25, 1990

Sugar and Spice is an American sitcom that aired on CBS from March 30, 1990 to May 25, 1990.

== Premise ==
The small town of Ponca City, Oklahoma, was the setting for this blue collar series about two middle-aged African American sisters. Loretta and Vickilyn (Loretta Devine and Vickilyn Reynolds) had very different personalities. Vickilyn was conservative and quiet, a divorcee making her living with Small World Miniatures, a mail-order business run out of her converted garage. Her gregarious sister Loretta, an aspiring actress with a roving eye for good-looking men, was biding time working as a hostess at Cafe Jacques, where the manager Jacques (Leslie Jordan) was also seen.

Living with them was their teenage niece Toby (LaVerne Anderson), the only child of their late sister, whose good intentions were sometimes derailed when she took bad advice from her best friend Ginger (Dana Hill). Bonnie (Stephanie Hodge), who had a tempestuous relationship with her trucker husband Cliff (Gerrit Graham), was Vickilyn's assistant at Small World Miniatures.

Ralph and Brian (Troy Searcy, Bumper Robinson) were schoolmates of Toby's.

== Cast ==
=== Main ===
- Vickilyn Reynolds as Vickilyn Fontaine-Clayton
- Loretta Devine as Loretta Fontaine
- LaVerne Anderson as Toby Reed
- Dana Hill as Ginger
- Stephanie Hodge as Bonnie Buttram

=== Recurring ===
- Leslie Jordan as Monsieur Jacques
- Fitz Houston as Deputy

=== Guest stars ===
- Dorian Harewood as Marcus
- Michael Talbott as Joe
- Gerrit Graham as Cliff
- Rick Fitts as Doug
- Willie C. Carpenter as Binder
- Elmarie Wendel as Bag Lady
- Nicholas Pryor as Mr.Prescott
- Maureen Arthur as New Yorker

== Episodes ==
No.	Title	Directed by	Written by	Original release date	Prod. code
1	"Doo-Wah Ditty in Ponca City"	Jack Shea	Cassandra Clark & Debbie Pearl	March 30, 1990	102
Loretta gets her old singing group back together (Vickilyn, Toby, Ginger, and Bonnie) to sing at the grand opening of a mall. Guest Stars: Terrah Bennett Smith and Patty Holly
2	"The Truck Stops Here"	Howard Storm	Steve Granat & Mel Sherer	April 6, 1990	103
Bonnie decides to leave her husband. Guest Star: Gerrit Graham
3	"Lovers and Other Truckers"	James Widdoes	Mark Alton Brown & Dee LaDuke	April 13, 1990	104
Vickilyn goes out on a blind date arranged by Loretta. Guest stars: Willie C. Carpenter, Rick Fitts, and Leslie Jordan
4	"This Hostess Ain't No Cupcake"	Howard Storm	Michael Loman	April 27, 1990	105
When Vickilyn fills in for Loretta, all hell breaks loose. Guest stars: Robert Fieldsteel, Floyd B. Jones, and Leslie Jordan
5	"Pilot"	Jack Shea	Katherine Green, Irma Kalish, Stephen Neigher, and Gina Wendkos	May 4, 1990	101
Pilot; Vickilyn's ex-husband returns for a romantic evening. Guest star: Dorian Harewood Note: Pilot was shown out of production order. Screenplay by the creators.
6	"Breaking in Is Hard to Do"	Michael Lembeck	Gina Wendkos	May 11, 1990	106
After breaking into the principal's office where Toby goes to school, the sisters are jailed. Guest stars: Maureen Arthur, Fitz Houston, Nicholas Pryor, Jennifer Richards, Michael Talbott, and Elmarie Wendel
7	"A Star Is Boring"	Jack Shea	Stephen Langford	May 25, 1990	107
Toby gets a part in the school play.
