= Tyra Ferrell =

American actress (born 1956)

- Born: March 29, 1956 (age 70); Houston, Texas, U.S.
- Occupations: Actress; dancer
- Years active: 1976–present

Tyra Ferrell (born March 29, 1956) is an American actress and dancer. Beginning her professional career as a dancer in the mid–1970s, Ferrell is best known for her work in films: Boyz n the Hood (1991), Jungle Fever (1991), White Men Can't Jump (1992), and Poetic Justice (1993). On television, she had starring roles in short-lived series The Bronx Zoo (1987−88) and City (1990), and recurred on Thirtysomething (1989−90), ER (1994) and Empire (2015). Ferrell has been nominated for two NAACP Image Awards.

== Life and career ==
Ferrell was born in Houston, Texas. She moved from Houston to New York after high school and began her career on stage including roles on Lena Horne: The Lady and Her Music (1981), as part of the Cotton Club chorus, and Ain't Misbehavin on Broadway.

She made her screen debut in a small role in the 1981 comedy film So Fine, and later appeared in Lady Beware, School Daze, The Mighty Quinn, and The Exorcist III. On television, she guest-starred in Hill Street Blues, The Twilight Zone, and Quantum Leap. Ferrell's first major role on television was Roberta in drama The Bronx Zoo (1987−88). She had recurring roles on Square One Television and Thirtysomething. In 1990, Ferrell was a regular cast member on the short-lived CBS sitcom City starring Valerie Harper, portraying secretary Wanda Jenkins.

In 1991, Ferrell played supporting roles in two films. She appeared as matriarch Brenda Baker in Boyz n the Hood. A critic believed Ferrell gave a "fine edge" to the character of Mrs. Baker. Ferrell earned an NAACP Image Award nomination for Outstanding Actress in a Motion Picture for her role in Boyz n the Hood. She portrayed Orin Goode, the love interest of John Torturro's character, in Jungle Fever. In the same year, she was listed as one of twelve "Promising New Actors of 1991" in John A. Willis' Screen World. The following year, she starred alongside Wesley Snipes as his wife Rhonda in the comedy film White Men Can't Jump. She later had supporting roles as Sonya, a janitor, in Equinox (1992) and a beauty salon owner named Jessie in Poetic Justice (1993).

Ferrell also played the leading role of prosecutor Cutter Dubuque alongside Mare Winningham in the 1993 Lifetime Television movie Better Off Dead. Ferrell received positive reviews for her performance in this film. One reviewer claimed she "breathed life" into her character. Another critic found Ferrell's portrayal "smooth," and a third opined Ferrell was "impressive." In 1994, she had the recurring role as Dr. Sarah Langworthy during the first season of the NBC medical drama ER, and from 1996 to 1997 she co-starred alongside Corbin Bernsen on the syndicated science fiction series The Cape as Tamara St. James.

In 2000, Ferrell co-starred alongside Khandi Alexander in the HBO miniseries The Corner. She later guest-starred on Soul Food, The Shield and Law & Order: Special Victims Unit. In 2005, she was nominated for her second NAACP Image Award, in the category of Outstanding Actress in a Television Movie, Miniseries or Dramatic Special for her role in the ABC television film NTSB: The Crash of Flight 323. After 2004, Ferrell took a break from acting.

She returned to acting ten years later with the leading role in Tasha Smith's directorial debut, Boxed In. In 2015, Ferrell was cast in a recurring role on the second season of Fox's prime-time soap opera Empire as Roxanne Ford, an attorney.

== Filmography ==
=== Film ===
| Year | Title | Role | Notes |
|---|---|---|---|
| 1981 | So Fine | Receptionist | |
| 1984 | Gimme an 'F' | Rocket Rafferty | |
| 1987 | Lady Beware | Nan | |
| 1987 | Nuts | Cell Woman #2 | |
| 1988 | Tapeheads | Flygirl | |
| 1988 | School Daze | Tasha | |
| 1988 | Side by Side | Rita Gold | TV movie |
| 1989 | The Mighty Quinn | Isola | |
| 1989 | The Neon Empire | Samantha | TV movie |
| 1990 | The Exorcist III | Nurse Blaine | |
| 1991 | Jungle Fever | Orin Goode | |
| 1991 | Boyz n the Hood | Brenda Baker | |
| 1992 | White Men Can't Jump | Rhonda Deane | |
| 1992 | Equinox | Sonya Kirk | |
| 1992 | Ulterior Motives | Receptionist | |
| 1992 | You Must Remember This | Ricki Sewell | TV movie |
| 1993 | Better Off Dead | Cutter Dubuque | TV movie |
| 1993 | Poetic Justice | Jessie | |
| 2004 | The Perfect Score | Mrs. Rhodes | |
| 2004 | NTSB: The Crash of Flight 323 | Jessamyn | TV movie |
| 2004 | Coochie | Olivia Potter | Short |
| 2015 | Boxed in | Gayle | Short |
| 2019 | The Bobby DeBarge Story | Etterlene DeBarge | TV movie |
| 2020 | A New York Christmas Wedding | Alison Wilks | |

=== Television ===
| Year | Title | Role | Notes |
|---|---|---|---|
| 1985 | Hill Street Blues | Jonelle Robinson | Episode: "Somewhere Over the Rambo" |
| 1985 | Moonlighting | Hooker | Episode: "Knowing Her" |
| 1985 | The Twilight Zone | Maid | Episode: "Dead Woman's Shoes" |
| 1986 | ABC Afterschool Special | Tracy | Episode: "Are You My Mother?" |
| 1986 | Hunter | Marguerite Montero | Episode: "Love, Hate, and Sporty James" |
| 1987 | Mathnet | Ginnie Carlson | Episode: "The Problem of the Missing Baseball" |
| 1987 | Square One Television | Ginnie Carlson | Recurring cast: season 1 |
| 1987-88 | The Bronx Zoo | Roberta Hughes | Main cast: season 1, recurring cast: season 2 |
| 1988 | Mr. Belvedere | Cashier #1 | Episode: "Hooky" |
| 1989 | Quantum Leap | Delilah 'Lila' Berry | Episode: "So Help Me God - July 29, 1957" |
| 1989-90 | Thirtysomething | Ricky Bianca | Recurring cast: season 3 |
| 1990 | Full House | Miss Petrie | Episode: "Bye, Bye Birdie" |
| 1990 | City | Wanda Jenkins | Main cast |
| 1990 | The Trials of Rosie O'Neill | Loni Sanders | Episode: "An Act of Love" |
| 1994 | ER | Dr. Sarah Langworthy | Recurring cast: season 1 |
| 1996-97 | The Cape | Mission Specialist Tamara St. James | Main cast |
| 1997 | Early Edition | Dr. Marks | Episode: "Faith" |
| 2000 | The Corner | Ella Thompson | Main cast |
| 2000 | Soul Food | Frances Lester | Episode: "Truth Be Told" |
| 2002 | The Shield | Karen Mitchell | Episode: "Two Days of Blood" |
| 2003 | Law & Order: Special Victims Unit | Bethany Taylor | Episode: "Futility" |
| 2015 | Empire | Roxanne Ford | Recurring cast: season 2 |
| 2017 | Tales | Courier | Episode: "99 Problems" |
| 2018 | Chicago PD | Mrs. Burton | Episode: "Breaking Point" |

=== Music video ===
| Year | Title | Role | Notes |
|---|---|---|---|
| 1985 | New Edition | passer-by | My Secret (Didja Gitit Yet?) |

== Awards and nominations ==
| Year | Awards | Category | Recipient | Outcome |
|---|---|---|---|---|
| 1992 | NAACP Image Award | NAACP Image Award for Outstanding Actress in a Motion Picture | Boyz n the Hood | Nominated |
| 2005 | NAACP Image Award | NAACP Image Award for Outstanding Actress in a Television Movie, Mini-Series or Dramatic Special | NTSB: The Crash of Flight 323 | Nominated |
