= Arnetia Walker =

American actress and singer

Arnetia Walker is an American actress and singer, active since 1971. She played Nurse Annie Roland in the NBC sitcom Nurses from 1991 to 1994.

== Life and career ==
Walker was born in Columbus, Georgia. She was very young when her mother died, and she never knew her father. Walker later moved to New York City and attended New York's High School of Performing Arts. She was cast in her Broadway debut, ‘A Raisin in the Sun’ by Lorraine Hansberry. She was Stephanie Mills's standby as Dorothy in the original Broadway run of The Wiz. She starred in the first national touring company of Dreamgirls in the role of Lorrell Robinson in 1983. Walker would go on to perform in the show's second national and international touring companies and the 1987 Broadway revival. She achieved the distinction of being the only woman to have played all three of that show's principal characters.

In 1982, Walker made her big screen debut appearing in the comedy film The Best Little Whorehouse in Texas. She later appeared in films The Wizard of Speed and Time (1988), Scenes from the Class Struggle in Beverly Hills (1989), and Love Crimes (1992). Her television films credits include Cast a Deadly Spell (1991), The Cherokee Kid (1996) and Geppetto (2000).

In 1991, Walker was cast as one of leads alongside Stephanie Hodge, Mary Jo Keenen and Ada Maris in the NBC sitcom Nurses, a spin-off of Empty Nest. The series ran three season and 68 episodes. Walker also was a regular cast member in the short-lived sitcoms Singer & Sons (1990) and The Big House (2004). She guest starred in a number of shows, including Quantum Leap, Living Single, Midnight Caller, Everybody Loves Raymond, City of Angels, Touched by an Angel, Amen and NYPD Blue. From 1999 to 2000, she had a recurring role in the WB comedy-drama series, Popular. In 2008, she played the role of Grandma Clara in the comedy film College Road Trip.

In 2017, she was cast in a recurring role of Luella Culhane in the CW prime time soap opera, Dynasty.

== Personal life ==
She is married to television news anchor/reporter Elliott Francis, and they have one child, Trevor.
