= Fitz Houston =

American actor

- Born: June 9, 1953 (age 72)
- Other name: Fitzhugh Houston
- Occupations: Actor; producer; director; musician; martial artist; minister
- Years active: 1974–present

Fitz Houston aka Fitzhugh G. Houston (born June 9, 1953) is an American actor, musician, author and pastor. As an actor, he played the part of Principal Gordon in Sister, Sister. He appeared in an episode of Sugar and Spice, also The Reverse Peephole, which was an episode of Seinfield and Trust No 1 which was an episode of The X-Files.

== Acting career ==
=== 1970s to 1980s ===
One of Houston's earliest film roles was in the 1979 film Disco Godfather which was directed by J Robert Wagoner and starred Rudy Ray Moore. He appeared in a couple of episodes of Knight Rider in 1982 and 1983. One of the roles was as an assembly speaker. He played the part of Det. Gilbert in the 1986 slasher film Sorority House Massacre which was directed by Carol Frank and produced by Roger Corman. Houston appeared in the 1988 film Night of the Kickfighters which was directed by Buddy Reyes and starred Adam West. This was a film about a group of martial artists who take on a terrorist group who are holding a secret weapon. Houston's character Socrates was part of a team that included a gadget man Bomber (played by Michelangelo Kowalski), Clea a computer expert (played by Phyllis Doyle), and Aldo a stage musician (played by Philip Dore).

=== 1990s ===
Houston played the part of Tony North in the Jean-Paul Ouellette-directed 1990 action film Chinatown Connection, which starred Lee Majors II and brucesploitation actor Bruce Ly. This was a film about two cops trying to find the source of poisoned cocaine. The Tony North character was a menacing and slick villain. He was the cartel enforcer, and he was also the one behind the poisoning of the narcotics. Fist of B-List in their review of the film likened him to as a cross between Predator-era Carl Weathers with muscles and former pro-wrestler, Norman Smiley great polo shirts and Norman Smiley.

Houston wanted to get into the field of voice acting, and he got the part of Mr. Bones in the 1996 video game Mr. Bones. Houston had some freedom his own ideas into the mix and he drew from the character George "Kingfish" Stevens which had been played by actor Tim Moore. Certain aspects of Houston's actual facial features were incorporated into the video characters emotion expression. Houston's lines were recorded at Sega Studios and he recorded a song "In This World" with Ronnie Montrose.

In 1998, he played a cop in an episode of Seinfeld, The Reverse Peephole, which aired on 1/8/98.

=== 2000s ===
He played the role of Melvin in the 2007 film Rich in Spirit which was directed by Cora Anne. It was a comedy about a preacher who has a belief that anyone can have a good life if they work hard for it. His belief is challenged when one day he switches body with a homeless man. Karen Andrade and Marquis Henderson also starred in the film.

The Eric Darnell Redding directed film, A Fatal Friend was released in 2015. He played the part of Captain Hunt. He appeared in the "Greg and Larry" episode of Brooklyn Nine-Nine. The episode also featured Dennis Haysbert, Tisha French and Kristin Hensley aired in 2016. He played the part of Pastor Fredricks in Eric Darnell Redding 2016 made-for-television movie, Hollywood Fiction which also starred Audi Resendez and Noah Staggs.

In 2018, Houston appeared in the Matthew Charles Santoro directed sci-fi film, Higher Power.

== Filmography (selective) ==
=== Television shows ===
Television
Title	Episode	Role	Director	Year	Notes
The Facts of Life	Starstruck	Fitz	Asaad Kelada	1982	as Fitzhugh Houston
Knight Rider	Just My Bill	Assembly Speaker	Sidney Hayers	1982	as Fitzhugh H. Houston
Knight Rider	Brother's Keeper	Sidney Hayers	Parole Board Member	1983	as Fitzhugh G. Houston
E/R	All Tied Up	Paramedic	Peter Bonerz	1985	as Fitzhugh Houston
Faerie Tale Theatre	Puss in Boots	Edward- Middle Brother	Robert Iscove	1985	
Hill Street Blues	Two Easy Pieces	Fleeing suspect	Gabrielle Beaumont	1996	Fitzhugh G. Houston
227	The Refrigerator	Friend	Ellen Chaset Falcon	1985	as Fitzhugh G. Houston
227	Check Snub	Sergeant	Gerren Keith	1987	as Fitzhugh G. Houston
227	Shall We Dance?	Phillip Evans	Gerren Keith	1988	
Matlock	The Umpire	Lt. Parker	Harvey S. Laidman	1988	as Fitzhugh G. Houston
Quantum Leap	Honeymoon Express - April 27, 1960	Black Senator	Aaron Lipstadt	1989	as Fitzhugh G. Houston
Knots Landing	If I Die Before I Wake	Sherriff	Joseph L. Scanlan	1990	as Fitzhugh G. Houston
Sugar and Spice	Breaking in Is Hard to Do	Deputy	Michael Lembeck	1990	
Married with Children	Man's Castle	Rich	Gerry Cohen	1991	as Fitzhugh G. Houston
My Life and Times	April 9, 2035	Policeman	Michael Apted	1991	as Fitzhugh G. Houston
The Wonder Years	Christmas Party	Clerk	Jim McBride	1991	as Fitzhugh Houston
Roc	No Notes Is Good Notes	Sam Cummings	Stan Lathan	1992	as Fitzhugh G. Houston
Tequila and Bonetti	The Rose Cadillac	Policeman at Movie Set	James Whitmore Jr.	1992	
A Different World	Sellmates	Grieving Customer	Henry Chan	1992	as Fitzhugh Houston
Coach	The Pioneer Bowl	Booster #2	Jeff Meyer	1993	
Seaquest DSV	Abalon	Other Policeman	Les Sheldon	1994	
The Eddie Files	Decimals: The Fake Money Caper	Sergeant	Rob Mikuriya	1997	
Sister, Sister	Child's Play	Principal Gordon	James Hampton	1997	
Mike Hammer, Private Eye	Hoop Nightmares	Eddie Thomas	Rex Piano	1997	
Seinfeld	The Reverse Peephole	Cop	Andy Ackerman	1998	
The Parent 'Hood	Color Him Father	Coach Fields	Loretha C. Jones	1998	
Sparks	Cain and Abel Sparks	Milo		1998	
Hang Time	Breaks of the Game	The Campus Guard	Patrick Maloney	1998	
The Norm Show	Norm vs. Christmas	Charlie	Gerry Cohen	1999	
The Michael Richards Show	The Identity Loan	Police Officer	Asaad Kelada	2000	
The Michael Richards Show	It's Only Personal	Police Officer	Sam Simon	2000	
Judging Amy	Adoption Day	Guard	James Hayman	2001	
Titus	The Smell of Success	Judge	Jack Kenny	2001	
Titus	Three Strikes	Judge	Joe Regalbuto	2001	
Philly	Blown Away	Jerry	Jeannot Szwarc	2001	
Family Law	Intentions	Jury Foreman #2	Richard J. Lewis	2001	
Family Law	No Options	Officer #2	Jerry Levine	2001	
The X Files	"Trust No 1"	Station Manager	Tony Wharmby	2002	
Providence	Smoke and Mirrors	Security Guard	Ian Toynton	2002	
Robbery Homicide Division	Mini-Mall	P.O. Mike Laskaway	Frederick King Keller	2002	
Malcolm in the Middle	Forbidden Girlfriend	Other man	Jamie Babbit	2002	
The District	Goodbye, Jenny	Ron - Bus Driver	Christopher Taylor	2003	
Watching Ellie	TV	Security Guard	Craig Zisk	2003	
JAG: Judge Advocate General	People vs. SecNav	Security Officer Ray Costanza	Dennis Smith	2004	
It's All Relative	A Long Day's Journey Into Leonard's	Whit	Barnet Kellman	2004	
That's So Raven	There Goes the Bride	Minister	Erma Elzy-Jones	2004	
NYPD Blue	You're Buggin' Me	Chuck	John Hyams	2004	
Standoff	Backfire	Metro Operator	Jonathan Glassner	2007	
True Jackson, VP	The Prototype	Security Guard	Joe Menendez	2009	
According to Jim	According to Jim	Police Officer	Dennis Capps	2009	
The Forgotten	Lucky John	Clerk	Tucker Gates	2009	
The Deep End	Pilot	Court Security Guard	Michael Fresco	2010	
The Secret Life of the American Teenager	Choices	Ed	Keith Truesdell	2010	
Get Thee Behind Me	12 Episodes	Pastor Ruford Royale	Sid Burston; Fitz Houston	2010; 2011	
Justified	Full Commitment	Louie	Peter Werner	2011	
90210	Women on the Verge	Stuart Gillard	Groundskeeper	2011	
Trophy Wife	The Tryst	Janitor	Victor Nelli Jr.	2013	
Black Jesus	Smokin', Drinkin', and Chillin	Eugene, The Parking Meter Man	Mike Clattenburg	2014	
Battle Creek	Syruptitious	Klecko	Andrew Bernstein	2015	
About Us	About Adjustments	James Sykes	Avery Anthony	2015	
Brooklyn Nine-Nine	Greg and Larry	Berj Jones	Daniel J. Goor	2016	
This Is Us	The Big Day	Teddy	Ken Olin	2017	
Fresh Off the Boat	Clean Slate	Mailman	Bill Purple	2017	
Baskets	Denver	Denver Taxi Driver	Jonathan Krisel	2017	
Rosewood	Calliphoridae & Country Roads	Townsperson	David Crabtree	2017	
Wicked	Introducing the Blanchard Family	Apostle Larry Blanchard	Deonte' Bolden	2017	
Wicked	You Shall Reap What You Sow	Apostle Larry Blanchard	Deonte' Bolden	2017	
Wicked	The Dark Cloud	Apostle Larry Blanchard	Deonte' Bolden	2017	
Wicked	Troubled Waters	Apostle Larry Blanchard	Deonte' Bolden	2017	
Wicked	Rebellious Souls	Apostle Larry Blanchard	Deonte' Bolden	2017	

=== Films ===
Film
Title	Role	Director	Year	Notes #
Disco Godfather		J. Robert Wagoner	1979	
Sorority House Massacre	Det. Gilbert	Carol Frank	1986	as Fitzhough Huston
Night of the Kickfighters	Socrates	Buddy Reyes	1988	as Fitzhugh G. Houston
A Killer Among Us		Peter Levin	1990	as Fitzhugh G. Houston
Chinatown Connection	Tony North	Jean-Paul Ouellette	1990	
Monday Morning	Chief Woods	Don Murphy	1990	as Fitzhugh G. Houston
Eastside	Car Wash Manager	Lorena David	1999	
The Extreme Adventures of Super Dave	Mover	Peter MacDonald	2000	
Four Dogs Playing Poker	Plainclothes Cop	Paul Rachman	2000	
Blood: The Last Vampire	S.P. #1 (voice)	Hiroyuki Kitakubo	2000	
Jane Doe: Vanishing Act	High Desert Federal Agent	James A. Contner	2005	TV movie
Rampart	Detective Thomas	Richard Givens	2005	
Cold Comfort	Sam	Hovik Thomasian	2006	
Sacrifices of the Heart	Prosecutor	David S. Cass Sr.	2007	TV movie
Rich in Spirit	Melvin	Cora Anne	2007	
Bound by a Secret	Ed	David S. Cass Sr.	2009	
Miles Away	Kenny MC. Reese	Jimmy Jenkins	2015	
A Fatal Friend	Captain Hunt	Eric Darnell Redding	2015	
Hollywood Fiction	Pastor Fredricks	Eric Darnell Redding	2016	TV movie
Higher Power	Frank	Matthew Charles Santoro	2018	

=== Video games ===
Title	Role	Year	Notes #
Mr. Bones	Mr. Bones	1996	voice, as F. Houston
Silent Hill: Homecoming	Deputy Wheeler	2008	voice

== Publications ==
Film
Title	Credited author	Publisher	Isbn	Year
MEN LET'S TALK! Pornography:The Quiet Addiction	Fitzhugh G. Houston	Lulu.com	ISBN 1411669711	January 20, 2006
GUIDED TO THE LIGHT Book One	Fitzhugh G. Houston	Houston Spectrum Publishing	ASIN: 0557078466	June 16, 2009
MEN LET'S TALK (The Victory Over Lust Survival Handbook)	Fitzhugh G. Houston	lulu.com	ISBN 0557195926	February 10, 2011
Spoken From the Heart	Fitzhugh G. Houston	Publisher: lulu.com	ISBN 0557415225	February 10, 2011
