= The Golden Girls season 6 =

The Golden Girls
- Season 6
- Season 6 DVD cover
- No. of episodes: 26

Release
- Original network: NBC
- Original release: September 22, 1990 – May 4, 1991

Season chronology
- ← Previous; Season 5 Next → Season 7

The sixth season of The Golden Girls premiered on NBC on September 22, 1990, and concluded on May 4, 1991. The season consisted of 26 episodes.

== Broadcast history ==
The season originally aired Saturdays at 9:00-9:30 pm (EST) on NBC from September 22, 1990, to May 4, 1991.

== Episodes ==
No. overall	No. in season	Title	Directed by	Written by	Original release date	Prod. code	U.S. viewers (millions)
129	1	"Blanche Delivers"	Matthew Diamond	Gail Parent and Jim Vallely	September 22, 1990	129	27.9
Blanche's very pregnant daughter Rebecca (Debra Engle) visits and wants to stay in Miami for the birth at a birthing center. Blanche angers her when she disagrees about the birthing center, but also does not want her giving birth in a hospital because she is embarrassed that her daughter was artificially inseminated. Meanwhile, Rose decides to fulfill a childhood dream of becoming a figure skater. Guest stars: Debra Engle as Rebecca; Ken Lerner as Doctor; Leila Kenzle as Tamara; John O'Leary as Mr. Ninervini
130	2	"Once, in St. Olaf"	Matthew Diamond	Harold Apter	September 29, 1990	131	26.6
Rose meets her biological father (Don Ameche) while volunteering at the hospital while Sophia undergoes hernia surgery and is lost in the hospital during her recovery. Guest stars: Don Ameche as Brother Martin; Scott Bryce as Dr. Warren; Michael Goldfinger as Attendant; Tom Henschel as Dr. Bob; Alicia Brandt as Dr. Tess; William Bumiller as Man; Note: Betty White was nominated for an Emmy Award for Outstanding Lead Actress in a Comedy Series for this episode.
131	3	"If At Last You Do Succeed"	Matthew Diamond	Robert Spina	October 6, 1990	132	25.4
Stan (Herb Edelman) finally strikes it rich with a baked potato opener, and asks Dorothy's help in wooing some Japanese investors, but Dorothy doesn’t trust him. Special Guest Star: Herb Edelman as Stan
132	4	"Snap Out of It"	Matthew Diamond	Richard Vaczy and Tracy Gamble	October 13, 1990	130	24.5
Dorothy agrees to help Sophia volunteer for Meals on Wheels and meets Jimmy (Martin Mull), an aging agoraphobic hippie, who hasn't left his apartment in 20 years. Blanche's birthday approaches and Rose goes on a quest to discover her real birth date. Guest stars: Martin Mull as Jimmy; Danny Breen as Emcee
133	5	"Wham, Bam, Thank You, Mammy!"	Matthew Diamond	Marc Cherry and Jamie Wooten	October 20, 1990	133	21.7
Blanche gets an unexpected visit from her childhood mammy (Ruby Dee), who reveals she and Blanche's father were lovers. Sophia angers Dorothy by using a matchmaker to find Dorothy a date. Guest stars: Ruby Dee as Mammy Watkins; Peggy Rea as Mrs. Contini; Richard McKenzie as Jack
134	6	"Feelings"	Matthew Diamond	Don Seigel and Jerry Perzigian	October 27, 1990	134	24.6
Dorothy receives backlash for failing the star football player (Christopher Daniel Barnes). Rose suspects her dentist (George Wyner) fondled her while under anesthesia. Guest stars: George Wyner as Dr. Norgan; Robert Costanzo as Coach Odlivak; Frank Hamilton as Father O'Mara; Christopher Daniel Barnes as Kevin
135	7	"Zborn Again"	Matthew Diamond	Mitchell Hurwitz	November 3, 1990	135	23.2
Dorothy finds her old feelings for Stan resurfacing; Rose asks for Sophia's assistance in dealing with an annoying co-worker (Siobhan Fallon Hogan). Special Guest Star: Herb Edelman as Stan; Guest stars: Siobhan Fallon Hogan as Abby; Dion Anderson as Mr. Percy
136	8	"How Do You Solve a Problem Like Sophia?"	Matthew Diamond	Marc Cherry and Jamie Wooten	November 10, 1990	136	27.5
After the death of her friend Sister Agnes, Sophia joins a convent; Rose is sued when Blanche borrows her car and has an accident. Guest stars: Kathleen Freeman as Mother Superior; Paul Willson as Arthur Nivingston; Lela Ivey as Sister Claire
137	9	"Mrs. George Devereaux"	Matthew Diamond	Richard Vaczy and Tracy Gamble	November 17, 1990	138	26.7
Blanche decides to meet a secret admirer, and is shocked to discover it is her dead husband, George (George Grizzard); Dorothy is wooed by Sonny Bono and Lyle Waggoner. Guest stars: George Grizzard as George Devereaux; Sonny Bono as himself; Lyle Waggoner as himself
138	10	"Girls Just Wanna Have Fun...Before They Die"	Matthew Diamond	Gail Parent and Jim Vallely	November 24, 1990	139	27.7
Sophia and Rose take dating advice from Blanche that lands each of them in hot water. After a vow of celibacy due to a drought in St. Olaf, Blanche advises Rose not to tell Miles; while Sophia follows Blanche's tips to lure her boyfriend Tony DelVecchio (Cesar Romero) into bed. Special Guest Star: Harold Gould as Miles; Guest stars: Cesar Romero as Tony
139	11	"Stand By Your Man"	Matthew Diamond	Tom Whedon	December 1, 1990	137	23.1
Blanche makes a date with a man at the library (Hugh Farrington), then realizes he uses a wheelchair; Rose gets a puppy, in spite of Blanche's and Dorothy's objection. Note: This episode is a crossover with Empty Nest, with the Weston's dog, Dreyfuss, appearing.
140	12	"Ebbtide's Revenge"	Matthew Diamond	Marc Sotkin	December 15, 1990	140	25.6
Dorothy must give the eulogy for her brother, Phil. And the long-running feud between Sophia and Phil's widow (Brenda Vaccaro) culminates in Sophia's revelation of her true feelings about her son‘s cross-dressing lifestyle. Guest stars: Brenda Vaccaro as Angela; Earl Boen as Father Salerno; Note: Estelle Getty was nominated for an Emmy Award for Outstanding Supporting Actress in a Comedy Series and Brenda Vaccaro was nominated for Outstanding Guest Actor in a Comedy Series for this episode. Marc Sotkin was nominated for Outstanding Writing for a Comedy Series at the WGA Awards for this episode.
141	13	"The Bloom Is Off the Rose"	Matthew Diamond	Phillip Jayson Lasker	January 5, 1991	142	27.2
Rose signs up sky-diving lessons to spice up her relationship with Miles (Harold Gould); Blanche uncharacteristically makes excuses for her abusive boyfriend (Mitchell Ryan). Special Guest Star: Harold Gould as Miles; Guest stars: Mitchell Ryan as Rex; Don Mirault as Flight Instructor
142	14	"Sister of the Bride"	Matthew Diamond	Marc Cherry and Jamie Wooten	January 12, 1991	141	29.8
Blanche's gay brother, Clayton (Monte Markham), visits Miami to announce he’s getting married; Rose expects to win a Volunteer of the Year award. Guest stars: Monte Markham as Clayton; Michael Ayr as Doug; Lou Cutell as Irving; Mimi Cozzens as Susan Dodd
143	15	"Miles to Go"	Matthew Diamond	Don Seigel and Jerry Perzigian	January 19, 1991	145	23.3
After learning of the death of a mob boss, Miles reveals he was an accountant from Chicago, until entering the Witness Relocation Program. When he learns the mobster faked his death, Miles must leave Miami. Meanwhile, Blanche must find a way to pay for the expensive dress that she bought, having hit a snag in her plan to simply return the dress after wearing it. Special Guest Star: Harold Gould as Miles; Guest stars: Mary Gillis as Gladys
144	16	"There Goes the Bride"	Matthew Diamond	Story by : Gail Parent, Jim Vallely, and Mitchell Hurwitz; Teleplay by : Mitchell Hurwitz	February 2, 1991	143	26.3
145	17	"There Goes the Bride"	Matthew Diamond	Gail Parent and Jim Vallely	February 9, 1991	144	26.4
Dorothy keeps her rekindled relationship with Stan a secret from Sophia; Rose goes out to dinner with a friend of Miles, whose ex-wife begins stalking Rose. Totally opposed Dorothy and Stan's impending nuptials, Sophia vows to stop the ceremony; Blanche interviews Truby (Debbie Reynolds), a potential roommate. Special Guest Stars: Herb Edelman as Stan; Debbie Reynolds as Truby; Guest stars: Jack Yates as Cop; Toni Sawyer as Lois; Raye Birk as The Caterer; Meg Wyllie as Myra; Jack Blessing as Father Monroe; Marvin Mitchelson as himself; Milt Oberman as Erroll; Cleto Augusto as Photographer
146	18	"Older and Wiser"	Matthew Diamond	Richard Vaczy and Tracy Gamble	February 16, 1991	146	17.4
Dorothy gets Sophia a job at a local retirement home under false pretenses. Meanwhile, Blanche and Rose are excited about modeling for a pennysaver. Guest stars: Don Lake as Mr. Porter; Julius Harris as Mr. Lewis; Carol Bruce as Lucille; Bill Wiley as Smokey; Ellen Albertini Dow as Sarah
147	19	"Melodrama"	Matthew Diamond	Robert Spina	February 16, 1991	147	22.2
Blanche wants to intensify her relationship with her infamous one-night stand man, Mel Bushman (Alan King); Rose tries her hand at TV reporting. Guest stars: Alan King as Mel Bushman; Tommy Hinkley as Andy; Jonathan Schmock as The Robber
148	20	"Even Grandmas Get the Blues"	Robert Berlinger	Gail Parent and Jim Vallely	March 2, 1991	149	23.8
While babysitting her infant granddaughter, a man (Alan Rachins) mistakes Blanche for the baby’s mother. Meanwhile, Sophia prepares for the Festival of the Dancing Virgins. Guest stars: Debra Engle as Rebecca
149	21	"Witness"	Zane Buzby	Mitchell Hurwitz	March 9, 1991	148	24.0
Rose has a new man (Barney Martin) in her life when Miles returns unexpectedly from the Witness Protection Program; Sophia loses her glasses; while petitioning to join the Daughters of the Old South, Blanche discovers one of her great-grandmothers is a Jewish Yankee, from Buffalo. Special Guest Star: Harold Gould as Miles; Special Appearance By: Kristy McNichol as Barbara Weston; Guest stars: Barney Martin as Karl; Beth Grant as Louise; Marla Adams as Woman #1; Gloria Dorson as Mrs. Ward; Elise Ogden as Woman #2; Note: This is a crossover with Empty Nest.
150	22	"What a Difference a Date Makes"	Lex Passaris	Marc Cherry and Jamie Wooten	March 23, 1991	150	24.6
Dorothy's former high school crush, John Neretti (guest star (Hal Linden), who stood her up for her prom, asks Dorothy out to dinner; Blanche diets to keep to her tradition of fitting into her wedding dress on her anniversary. Guest stars: Hal Linden as John; Sid Melton as Don The Fool
151	23	"Love for Sale"	Peter D. Beyt	Don Seigel and Jerry Perzigian	April 6, 1991	151	22.0
The girls prepare for the Children's Hospital bachelorette auction; Stan's uncle dies, leaving him and Dorothy his apartment building. Meanwhile, Sophia's brother, Angelo (Bill Dana), comes to Miami, broke with no place to live. Special Guest Star: Herb Edelman as Stan; Guest stars: Bill Dana as Uncle Angelo; Lou Felder as Terry
152	24	"Never Yell Fire in a Crowded Retirement Home"	Matthew Diamond	Story by : Gail Parent; Teleplay by : Tracy Gamble, Richard Vaczy, Tom Whedon, and Mitchell Hurwitz	April 27, 1991	153	21.0
153	25	"Never Yell Fire in a Crowded Retirement Home"	Matthew Diamond	Story by : Jim Vallely; Teleplay by : Richard Vaczy, Tracy Gamble, Don Seigel, and Jerry Perzigian	April 27, 1991	154	21.0
A former Shady Pines resident makes a deathbed confession that she and Sophia started the Shady Pines fire in 1985. Guest stars: Stanley Kamel as Herb; Richard Riehle as Detective Parres
154	26	"Henny Penny — Straight, No Chaser"	Judy Pioli	Tom Whedon	May 4, 1991	152	22.0
When the measles quarantines Dorothy's students, the ladies take over the roles at the school play, Henny Penny. Meanwhile, Blanche‘s ex-boyfriend plants a fake obituary in the paper claiming she died at age 68; Sophia continues a decades-old chess-by-mail rivalry with her old nemesis from Sicily. Guest stars: George Hearn as Frank Nann

== Awards and nominations ==
43rd Primetime Emmy Awards

- Nomination for Outstanding Comedy Series
- Nomination for Outstanding Lead Actress in a Comedy Series (Betty White) (Episode: "Once, in St. Olaf")
- Nomination for Outstanding Supporting Actress in a Comedy Series (Estelle Getty) (Episode: "Ebbtide's Revenge")
- Nomination for Outstanding Guest Actor in a Comedy Series (Brenda Vaccaro) (Episode: "Ebbtide's Revenge")

48th Golden Globe Awards

- Nomination for Best Comedy Series

Writers Guild of America Awards

- Nomination for Outstanding Writing for a Comedy Series (Marc Sotkin) (Episode: "Ebbtide's Revenge")
