= The Golden Girls season 7 =

The Golden Girls
- Season 7
- DVD cover
- No. of episodes: 26

Release
- Original network: NBC
- Original release: September 21, 1991 – May 9, 1992

Season chronology
- ← Previous; Season 6

The seventh and final season of The Golden Girls premiered on NBC on September 21, 1991, and concluded on May 9, 1992. The season consisted of 26 episodes. It was the only season of the show that aired additional scenes during the final credits, and also the only season to feature no reused clips from prior episodes since season 2

== Broadcast history ==
The season originally aired Saturdays at 8:00-8:30 pm (EST) on NBC from September 21, 1991, to May 9, 1992. The Nielsen ratings of this season suffered following NBC's ill-advised decision to move the show away from Saturdays at 9:00-9:30 pm (EST), which was the timeslot it occupied for the past 6 seasons. As well as that, it faced direct competition from ABC's Who's the Boss?.

== Episodes ==
No. overall	No. in season	Title	Directed by	Written by	Original release date	Prod. code	U.S. viewers (millions)
155	1	"Hey, Look Me Over"	Lex Passaris	Mitchell Hurwitz	September 21, 1991	155	20.3
An old photograph appears to show Rose's late husband, Charlie, in bed with Blanche. Dorothy worries that Sophia has hearing loss, but when they go for a test, it turns out Dorothy is the one who needs a hearing aid.
156	2	"The Case of the Libertine Belle"	Lex Passaris	Tom Whedon	September 28, 1991	157	15.7
The girls participate in a murder-mystery weekend where Dorothy excels as a keen amateur sleuth, but, after she solves the murder, there is a real stabbing, and Blanche is the prime suspect. Guest stars: Todd Susman as Spade Marlowe; Tony Plana as Lieutenant Alvarez; Richard Roat as Kendall Nesbit; Claudette Sutherland as Posey McGlynn; Nicholas Kepros as Maitre 'D; Zach Grenier as Vaczy; Leland Orser as Waiter; Gloria Cromwell as Gloria; Tim Haldeman as Man; Margery Nelson as Woman. Note: This episode was meant as a parody of the CBS series, Murder, She Wrote, starring Angela Lansbury, who was a close friend of Bea Arthur. Richard Roat appears in a season 1 episode as Al Beatty.
157	3	"Beauty and the Beast"	Lex Passaris	Marc Cherry and Jamie Wooten	October 5, 1991	158	18.2
Blanche signs her granddaughter up for the Little Miss Miami Pageant, but becomes so focused on winning, it makes her miserable. With Sophia reliant on a wheelchair, Dorothy hires a nurse to take care of her, and not only does her bossiness anger Rose and Blanche, but when she and Sophia bond, it makes Dorothy jealous. Guest stars: Edie McClurg as Nurse DeFarge; Alisan Porter as Melissa; Barbara Alyn Woods as Woman; Mindy Ann Martin as Clarice; Robert Gould as Stage Manager.
158	4	"That's for Me to Know"	Lex Passaris	Kevin Abbott	October 12, 1991	159	19.2
While researching her family's history, Dorothy discovers a photo of Sophia as a young bride with a groom identified as "Guido," who is not Dorothy's father. When Blanche plans to have a hot tub installed, a city inspector informs her that continuing to have more than two renters would require her to make home improvements she cannot afford, meaning one of the girls must move out. Guest star: Richard Stahl as Don.
159	5	"Where's Charlie?"	Lex Passaris	Gail Parent and Jim Vallely	October 19, 1991	156	15.5
When Miles gives Rose a friendship ring, Sophia convinces Rose that her late husband, Charlie, does not approve of her relationship, resulting in Rose hurting Miles. Blanche helps her amateur baseball player boyfriend improve his play, but the plan backfires when he is recruited by a team in Japan and becomes a cross dresser. Special Guest Star: Harold Gould as Miles; Guest stars: Tim Thomerson as Stevie.
160	6	"Mother Load"	Lex Passaris	Don Seigel and Jerry Perzigian	October 26, 1991	160	15.2
Blanche's dating a local newscaster is threatened by his over-protective mother and Rose's efforts at uncovering embarrassing secrets about him for an upcoming surprise birthday party. Dorothy attends a counseling session with Stan. Special Guest Star: Herb Edelman as Stan; Guest stars: Peter Graves as Jerry Kennedy; Meg Wyllie as Millicent Kennedy; Steve Landesberg as Dr. Halperin. Notes: Meg Wyllie appears in two episodes in season 3 and one in season 6.
161	7	"Dateline: Miami"	Peter D. Beyt	Marc Cherry and Jamie Wooten	November 2, 1991	163	18.7
The girls reminisce about previous dates at home while Dorothy is out late with a prominent doctor. Guest stars: Pat Harrington Jr. as John; Fred Willard as Bob; Lenny Wolpe as Arnie; Jesse Dabson as Myron; Lyn Greene as Young Dorothy; Richard Tanner as Young Stan; Margaret Reed as Pregnant Woman; May Quigley as Woman; Stan Roth as Policeman; Nick Ullett as Waiter. Note: Betty White was nominated for an Emmy Award for Outstanding Lead Actress in a Comedy Series for this episode.
162	8	"The Monkey Show"	Lex Passaris	Mitchell Hurwitz and Marc Sotkin	November 9, 1991	161	24.7
163	9	"The Monkey Show"	Lex Passaris	Mitchell Hurwitz and Marc Sotkin	November 9, 1991	162	24.7
As a hurricane threatens Miami, Dorothy's newly penniless sister, Gloria, visits and sleeps with Stan. Dorothy becomes furious when she finds out later that Sophia pushed Gloria and Stan together. When she confronts Sophia, they have a fight, and Sophia angrily walks out into the hurricane. Blanche and Rose hold a telethon to save a local historic lighthouse. The episode derives its title from Stan seeing a therapist, who suggests that Stan transfer his feelings for Dorothy to a surrogate, namely, a toy doll of a monkey. Special Guest Star: Herb Edelman as Stan; Special Appearance by: Dinah Manoff as Carol Weston; Guest stars: Dena Dietrich as Gloria; Bill Dana as Angelo; Steve Landesberg as Dr. Halperin; Ed Hooks as Stage Manager; Jonathan Schmock as Cop #1; Matthew Saks as Cop #2; Don Seigel as Davey Cricket; Bryan Norcross as himself; Richard Reicheg as Man. Note: One-hour episode that marks the beginning of Hurricane Saturday. Cop #2 is played by Matthew Saks, one of Bea Arthur's sons. Steve Landesberg appears as Dr. Halperin earlier in season 1 in Mother Load. Don Seigel is a producer on the show. Jonathan Schmock appears in one episode in season 5 and two in season 6 and wrote an episode of The Golden Palace.
164	10	"Ro$e Love$ Mile$"	Lex Passaris	Don Seigel, Jerry Perzigian, Richard Vaczy, and Tracy Gamble	November 16, 1991	164	20.3
Rose, tired of Miles' penny-pinching ways, decides to take Blanche's advice and goes out with her and some big spenders. While Dorothy is away, she leaves Blanche in charge of an especially rebellious Sophia. Blanche panics when she finds that Sophia has traveled to Sicily to square things with Guido, the man she stood up at the altar decades earlier. Special Guest Star: Harold Gould as Miles; Guest stars: Bill Dana as Angelo; John P. Connolly as Mort; Harvey Vernon as Barry; Joe Mays as Maitre 'D; David Pressman as Waiter; Phil Leeds as Guido.
165	11	"Room 7"	Peter D. Beyt	Tracy Gamble and Richard Vaczy	November 23, 1991	165	19.7
Sophia has an out-of-body experience where she sees her late husband, Salvadore, who gives her a message for Dorothy, but Dorothy refuses to accept Sophia's experience. Meanwhile, the girls travel to Atlanta, Georgia when Blanche learns that her grandmother's plantation is scheduled to be demolished. The trip takes a turn when a distraught Blanche handcuffs herself to the radiator in the house. Guest stars: Sid Melton as Salvadore Petrillo; Roy Brocksmith as William; Gibby Brand as Man; Don Stark as Sheriff.
166	12	"From Here to the Pharmacy"	Lex Passaris	Gail Parent and Jim Vallely	December 7, 1991	166	17.6
Blanche is surprised when a soldier returning from the Persian Gulf visits, seeking to rekindle their relationship. Initially, she is charmed at the romantic prospect of dating a soldier, and then is let down when she discovers he has a boring job as a pharmacist. When Sophia has her will prepared, Dorothy is incensed when she finds out Sophia has hoarded $35,000 from her while Dorothy scrimped to support her and cuts her off financially. Guest stars: Bruce Kirby as Bill; Ed Call as Security Guard; Sergia Simone as Woman.
167	13	"The Pope's Ring"	Lex Passaris	Kevin Abbott	December 14, 1991	167	16.6
Sophia attends Pope John Paul II's Papal mass in Miami, hoping to get a blessing for her hospitalized friend Agnes and steals the pope's piscatory ring, upsetting Dorothy. For Rose's birthday, Blanche hires a private detective to spy on Miles, whom she suspects might have an affair as a result of a midlife crisis. Special Guest Star: Harold Gould as Miles; Guest stars: Steven Gilborn as Priest; Fred McCarren as Detective; Eugene Greytack as The Pope. Note: Steven Gilborn appears in the season 5 episode Ebb Tide.
168	14	"Old Boyfriends"	Peter D. Beyt	Jamie Wooten and Marc Cherry	January 4, 1992	168	20.5
Sophia develops feelings for Marvin, a man she met through a personal ad, but is annoyed that his sister, Sarah, always accompanies them. Marvin eventually spills the beans that Sarah is actually his wife. Sarah explains that she is dying and they are looking for a replacement for her, which leaves Sophia torn about what to do. A man claiming to be an old flame of Rose's visits, but she cannot remember him. Guest stars: Ken Berry as Thor; Betty Garrett as Sarah; Louis Guss as Marvin.
169	15	"Goodbye, Mr. Gordon"	Lex Passaris	Gail Parent and Jim Vallely	January 11, 1992	169	19.8
Dorothy is excited when her 11th-grade English teacher, on whom she had a crush, relocates to Miami, asks her for help writing a book review, and romances her. Sophia worries that he is taking advantage of Dorothy's interest, but Dorothy ignores her warnings. Rose is promoted to associate producer at the television station and upsets Blanche and Dorothy when she brings them on a morning talk show, ostensibly to talk about being female roommates, but in reality, the show is about lesbians. Guest star: James T. Callahan as Malcolm Gordon; Jack Bannon as Chuck; Phil Proctor as Ron; Jana Arnold as Pat; Kent Zbornak as Kent. Notes: Kent Zbornak was a stage manager on the show and on The Golden Palace and inspired Dorothy and Stan's last name.
170	16	"The Commitments"	Lex Passaris	Tracy Gamble and Richard Vaczy	January 25, 1992	170	18.9
When Dorothy wins tickets to "Beatlemania", she gets Blanche to take her place on a blind date. Blanche falls for the man, but is heartbroken when he is reluctant to be physical with her. Dorothy dates Don, Beatlemania's George impersonator, eventually convincing him to leave the show and perform his own material, with disastrous consequences. Guest stars: Ken Howard as Jerry; Terry Kiser as Don; Biff Yeager as Bellboy.
171	17	"Questions and Answers"	Lex Passaris	Don Seigel and Jerry Perzigian	February 8, 1992	171	19.9
Dorothy is excited when Jeopardy! comes to Miami to audition contestants and overdoes it in preparing for her own audition. The girls give Rose a rescue dog named Jake to raise her spirits, and she takes him with her when she volunteers at the local hospital, eventually making an impression on an elderly couple. Special Appearance by: David Leisure as Charley Dietz; Guest stars: Alex Trebek, Johnny Gilbert, and Merv Griffin as themselves; Derek McGrath as Coordinator; Bill Erwin as Mr. Hubbard; Camila Ashland as Mrs. Hubbard; Raymond Forchion as Professor Bradley. Note: This episode is a crossover with Empty Nest.
172	18	"Ebbtide VI: The Wrath of Stan"	Lex Passaris	Marc Sotkin	February 15, 1992	172	16.0
Dorothy's uncle Angelo complains of a bug infestation at the building where he lives, which is owned by Dorothy and Stan. Needing a good news story for sweeps week, Rose produces a piece on the apartment, resulting in Stan's and Dorothy's arrest as slum lords. Sophia aggravates Dorothy and Blanche when each takes her shoe shopping. Special Guest Star: Herb Edelman as Stan; Guest stars: Bill Dana as Angelo; Lane Davies as Peterson; Jackie Swanson as Tracy; Art Metrano as Judge; David Doty as Police Officer; Cynthia Lea Clark as Court Reporter (uncredited).
173	19	"Journey to the Center of Attention"	Lex Passaris	Jamie Wooten and Marc Cherry	February 22, 1992	173	17.8
Blanche takes a lonely Dorothy down to the Rusty Anchor, Blanche's favorite hangout, and gets more than she bargained for when Dorothy's singing is a hit with all the guys. Sophia is inspired by all the beautiful comments made at a friend's wake and enlists Rose to help her organize one while she is still alive, with disastrous consequences for Sophia's friends. Guest stars: Jane Dulo as Myrtle; Ann Nelson as Eva; Don Mirault as Piano Player; Warren Munson as Frank; Kevin Brief as Roger; Gregory White as Bartender. Notes: Don Mirault appears as the Flight Instructor in the season 6 episode The Bloom is Off the Rose.
174	20	"A Midwinter Night's Dream"	Lex Passaris	Kevin Abbott	February 29, 1992	174	21.9
175	21	"A Midwinter Night's Dream"	Lex Passaris	Tom Whedon	February 29, 1992	175	21.9
Blanche throws a men-only Moonlight Madness party to celebrate a full moon on Leap Day, and is devastated when Dorothy gets all the attention. She is further upset when she does meet a man, but he steals her valuable necklace. Rose proposes to Miles after winning a free honeymoon to Paris, France, but Miles worries they are rushing things, especially after he and Dorothy share a passionate, unplanned kiss. Sophia works to undo a curse put on Dorothy by helping a holy man, kissing a fool, and revealing a loved one's betrayal. Special Guest Star: Harold Gould as Miles; Dinah Manoff as Carol Weston; Kristy McNichol as Barbara Weston; Guest stars: Hank Brandt as Brent; Marius Weyers as Derek; Neal Lerner as Rabbi; Doug Ballard as Policeman; Tony Segreto as himself; Bear the Dog as Dreyfuss (uncredited). Note: One-hour episode that marks the beginning of Full Moon Over Miami.
176	22	"Rose: Portrait of a Woman"	Lex Passaris	Robert Spina	March 7, 1992	176	19.4
Rose is humiliated when she takes Blanche's advice and gives Miles a naughty picture of herself. Dorothy reconnects with a former student, who offers her an initially exciting new job. Special Guest Star: Harold Gould as Miles; Guest stars: Tom Villard as Randy; Keone Young as Mr. Tanaka; Angelo Tiffe as Harry; Gloria Dorson as Lillian; Glen Vernon as Charles; Dylan Lawrence as Student; Robert Yacko as Don; Carol Spillman as Teacher (uncredited). Notes: Tom Villard appears in the season 2 episode Vacation. Keone Young appears in the season 5 episode Sick and Tired: Part 2.
177	23	"Home Again, Rose"	Peter D. Beyt	Gail Parent	April 25, 1992	177	17.7
178	24	"Home Again, Rose"	Peter D. Beyt	Gail Parent	May 2, 1992	178	20.0
Blanche convinces the girls to crash a local high school reunion, where Rose suffers a heart attack. As Rose undergoes triple bypass surgery, Blanche, Dorothy and Sophia grapple with the possibility of losing her. Meanwhile, Rose's daughter, Kirsten, arrives and expresses her disapproval of her mother's living arrangements. Guest stars: Jessica Lundy as Janet; Lou Wagner as Larry; Rudolph Willrich as Pete; Paul Solomon as Man; Mario Roccuzzo as man #1; Kevin Cooney as man #2; David Cromwell as man #3; Robin Faye Bookland as Sarah; Linden Chiles as Dr. Thompson; Audree Chapman as Nurse; Lee Garlington as Kirsten; Paul Collins as Dr. Shrewsbury; Notes: Paul Collins appears in the season 5 episode The Mangiacavallo Curse Makes a Lousy Wedding Present.
179	25	"One Flew Out of the Cuckoo's Nest"	Lex Passaris	Don Seigel and Jerry Perzigian	May 9, 1992	179	27.2
180	26	"One Flew Out of the Cuckoo's Nest"	Lex Passaris	Mitchell Hurwitz	May 9, 1992	180	27.2
When Blanche's Uncle Lucas visits, Blanche sets him up on a date with Dorothy, and when they discover that neither is interested in the other, contrary to what Blanche led them to believe, they decide to get revenge by convincing Blanche they have fallen in love and plan to marry. Eventually, they fall in love for real, Lucas proposes, and Dorothy accepts, resulting in her moving out of the house permanently. Rose struggles with whether to stay in the house or to move in with her daughter, and Stan makes one last gesture to show his love for Dorothy. Special Guest Star: Herb Edelman as Stan; Guest stars: Leslie Nielsen as Lucas; Earl Boen as Reverend. Notes: "One Flew Out of the Cuckoo's Nest" won an Emmy for Outstanding Technical Direction/Camera/Video for a Series. Estelle Getty was nominated for an Emmy Award for Outstanding Supporting Actress in a Comedy Series for this episode. Earl Boen appears in the season 6 episode Ebbtide's Revenge and in an episode of The Golden Palace, both as a priest.

== Awards and nominations ==
44th Primetime Emmy Awards

- Nomination for Outstanding Lead Actress in a Comedy Series (Betty White) (Episode: "Dateline: Miami")
- Nomination for Outstanding Supporting Actress in a Comedy Series (Estelle Getty) (Episode: "One Flew Out of the Cuckoo's Nest")

49th Golden Globe Awards

- Nomination for Best Comedy Series
- Nomination for Best Supporting Actress – Series, Miniseries or Television Film (Estelle Getty)
