= Shay Duffin =

Irish character actor

- Born: 26 February 1931; Dublin, Ireland
- Died: 23 April 2010 (aged 79); Los Angeles, California, U.S.
- Occupation: Actor
- Years active: 1976–2007
- Children: Laura, Linda, Ruth, Susan
- Website: shayduffin.net

Shay Duffin (26 February 1931 – 23 April 2010) was an Irish character actor of the stage and screen. He was in the 1993 film Leprechaun with Jennifer Aniston. He also had a role in the 1997 film Titanic.

He was best known for writing and acting the title role in the one-man play Brendan Behan: Confessions of An Irish Rebel.

== Discography ==
- 1972: Shay Duffin Is Brendan Behan (Potato Records / POT 3202)

== Filmography ==
=== Television ===
Shay Duffin' television credits
Year	Title	Role	Notes
1976	Law and Order	—N/a	Television film
1976	Switch	Father Gorman	Episode: "The Twelfth Commandment"
1977	The Amazing Howard Hughes	Butler	Television film
1977	Captains Courageous	Chief Steward	Television film
1978	The Other Side of Hell	Miller	Television film
1978	Mother, Juggs & Speed	Whiplash Moran	Television film
1979	Mary and Joseph: A Story of Faith	Rabbi Bartholomew	Television film
1985	American Playhouse	Judge Hathorne	Episode: "Three Sovereigns for Sarah: Part I"
1987	J. Edgar Hoover	NY Chief of Police	Television film Uncredited
1987	Cagney & Lacey	Bartender	Episode: "Video Verite"
1990	City	Sean	9 episodes
1992	Murder, She Wrote	Brian Mulrain	Episode: "The Wind Around the Tower"
1994	Star Trek: The Next Generation	Ned Quint	Episode: "Sub Rosa"
1995	Due South	Father Behan	4 episodes

=== Film ===
Shay Duffin' film credits
Year	Title	Role	Notes
1977	The White Buffalo	Tim Brady (bartender)	Film debut role
1978	Bloodbrothers	Banion's Bar Man #5	
1979	Butch and Sundance: The Early Days	Engineer	
1979	The Main Event	Fight Announcer	Main role
1979	The Frisco Kid	O'Leary	
1980	The Baltimore Bullet	Big Al	
1980	Raging Bull	Ring announcer for Janiro Fight	
1983	10 to Midnight	Nestor	
1992	Memoirs of an Invisible Man	Patrick	
1992	Newsies	Captain McSwain	
1992	The Public Eye	Chief of Police	
1993	Leprechaun	Dan O'Grady	
1995	Number One Fan	Bartender	
1996	Precious Find	Poker Player #1	
1996	Head Above Water	Policeman	
1997	Titanic	Pubkeeper	
2003	Seabiscuit	Sunny Fitzsimmons	
2006	The Departed	Bartender at Brasserie	
2007	The Still Life	Bartender	
2007	Beowulf	Scylding's Watch	Final film role
