= Nurses (American TV series) =

American television sitcom

- Genre: Sitcom
- Created by: Susan Harris
- Directed by: Robert Berlinger; Peter D. Beyt; Andy Cadiff; Terry Hughes; Gil Junger; Lex Passaris; Tom Straw
- Starring: Arnetia Walker; Stephanie Hodge; Mary Jo Keenen; Carlos Lacamara; Jeff Altman; Florence Stanley; David Rasche; Loni Anderson; Kip Gilman; Markus Flanagan; Ada Maris
- Theme music composer: George Aliceson Tipton (seasons 1–2); John Bettis (seasons 1–2); Mike Post (season 3)
- Opening theme: "Here I Am"
- Composers: George Aliceson Tipton; Frank Denson; Mike Post
- Country of origin: United States
- Original language: English
- No. of seasons: 3
- No. of episodes: 68 (list of episodes)

Production
- Executive producers: Susan Beavers; Susan Harris; Paul Junger Witt; Tom Straw; Tony Thomas; Bob Underwood
- Producers: Andy Cadiff; Gil Junger; Nina Feinberg; Mitchell Hurwitz; Michael J. Kagan; Jane Milmore; Danny Smith; Billy Van Zandt; Nina Wass
- Camera setup: Multi-camera
- Running time: 22–24 minutes
- Production companies: Witt/Thomas/Harris Productions; Touchstone Television

Original release
- Network: NBC
- Release: September 14, 1991 – May 7, 1994

Related
- The Golden Girls; Empty Nest

Nurses is an American sitcom television series that aired on NBC from September 14, 1991, to May 7, 1994, created and produced by Susan Harris as a spin-off of Empty Nest, which itself was a spin-off of The Golden Girls.

== Synopsis ==
The series revolved around a group of nurses working at the same Miami hospital as Empty Nest's Dr. Harry Weston. The main characters were strong-willed nurse Annie Roland (Arnetia Walker), sarcastic nurse Sandy Miller (Stephanie Hodge), dim-witted nurse Julie Milbury (Mary Jo Keenen) and Latina nurse Gina Cuevas (Ada Maris) who frequently reminisced about her homeland, the fictional San Pequeño. Also in the cast were arrogant Dr. Hank Kaplan (Kip Gilman), wise-cracking orderly Paco Ortiz (Carlos Lacamara) and flaky nurse Greg Vincent (Jeff Altman). Florence Stanley had a recurring role during the first season as Dr. Riskin.

Changes were made after the first season in an effort to boost ratings. David Rasche joined the cast as Jack Trenton, a slimy white-collar criminal forced to perform community service at the hospital, and in the final season Loni Anderson joined the cast as new hospital administrator Casey McAfee. Other changes included the addition of Markus Flanagan as distant nurse Luke Fitzgerald for the second season only, the changing of the show's theme song in seasons two and three, having nurse Gina and Hank Kaplan get married (Gina being pregnant by Hank). Nurse Greg Vincent was also written off after season one.

In the series' final season, nurse Sandy was gone, and the series' focus moved increasingly from the nurses to Casey McAfee's adjustments in running the hospital under a new HMO, and the antics of Jack Trenton and his sidekick Paco the orderly.

== Cast ==
- Stephanie Hodge as Nurse Sandy Miller (1991–1993)
- Arnetia Walker as Nurse Annie Roland
- Mary Jo Keenen as Nurse Julie Milbury
- Jeff Altman as Greg Vincent (1991–1992)
- Ada Maris as Gina Cuevas
- Kip Gilman as Dr. Hank Kaplan (credited in Season 1 as Kenneth David Gilman)
- Carlos Lacámara as Paco Ortiz
- Florence Stanley as Dr. Riskin (1991–1992)
- Markus Flanagan as Luke Fitzgerald (1992–1993)
- David Rasche as Jack Trenton (1992–1994)
- Loni Anderson as Casey MacAfee (1993–1994)

== Episodes ==
Season	Episodes	Originally released	
Season	Episodes	First released	Last released
1	22	September 14, 1991	May 2, 1992
2	24	September 19, 1992	May 1, 1993
3	22	September 25, 1993	May 7, 1994

== Crossovers ==
The following is a list of Nurses episodes featuring characters from The Golden Girls and Empty Nest.

Season One

- Episode 2: "A Lesson in Life" – Laverne Todd from Empty Nest
- Episode 6: "Mother, Jugs, and Zach" – Harry Weston from Empty Nest
- Episode 9: "Begone with the Wind" – Rose Nylund from The Golden Girls and Laverne Todd from Empty Nest
- Episode 20: "Moon Over Miami" – Blanche Devereaux from The Golden Girls and Charley Dietz from Empty Nest

Season Two

- Episode 2: "In My New Country" – Laverne Todd from Empty Nest
- Episode 7: "Playing Doctor" – Carol Weston from Empty Nest

Season Three

- Episode 1: "The Eagle Has Landed" – Harry Weston from Empty Nest
- Episode 4: "Jack's Indecent Proposal" – Charley Dietz from Empty Nest
- Episode 7: "The Bridges of Dade Country" – Harry Weston from Empty Nest
- Episode 9: "Temporary Setbacks" – Sophia Petrillo from The Golden Girls and Empty Nest, and Carol Weston from Empty Nest
- Episode 10: "The Birth of a Marriage" – Harry Weston from Empty Nest
