= Kip Gilman =

American television actor

- Born: Kenneth David Gilman; November 18, 1946 (age 79); Revere, Massachusetts, U.S.
- Occupation: Television actor
- Years active: 1976–present
- Spouse: Jamie Rose (m. 2006; div. 2017)

Kenneth David Gilman (born November 18, 1946) is an American television actor. He is best known for playing Dr. Hank Kaplan in the American sitcom television series Nurses.

Gilman was born in Revere, Massachusetts. He began his career in 1976, appearing in the television sitcom Rhoda. He then starred in the new CBS sitcom television series Loves Me, Loves Me Not. After its cancellation, he starred with Dorothy Loudon in the new CBS sitcom Dorothy. He guest-starred in television programs including Highway to Heaven; Who's the Boss?; Soap; Laverne & Shirley; Magnum, P.I.; It's a Living; Jake and the Fatman; The Rockford Files; St. Elsewhere; ALF and Columbo.

In 1981, Gilman starred in the CBS drama television series Jessica Novak. Gilman also starred in the 1984 erotic film Bedroom Eyes, the final season of the medical drama television series Trapper John, M.D., and the ABC drama television series Studio 5-B.

In 1991, Gilman starred as Dr. Hank Kaplan in the NBC sitcom Nurses. He played the role until 1994. After the series ended, Gilman made a guest appearance in Caroline in the City and appeared in the film Parker. He played as Danzinger. In 2015, Gilman starred in the Off-Broadway play 2 Across along with singer and actress Andrea McArdle.
