= List of Nurses episodes =

Nurses is a television series that originally ran on NBC for three seasons between 1991 and 1994.

== Series overview ==
Season	Episodes	Originally released	
Season	Episodes	First released	Last released
1	22	September 14, 1991	May 2, 1992
2	24	September 19, 1992	May 1, 1993
3	22	September 25, 1993	May 7, 1994

== Episodes ==
=== Season 1 (1991–92) ===
No. overall	No. in season	Title	Directed by	Written by	Original release date	Viewers (millions)
1	1	"Son of a Pilot"	Andy Cadiff and Terry Hughes	Susan Harris	September 14, 1991	22.3
The newest nurse, Julie, doesn't exactly inspire her co-workers with confidence. Meanwhile, Sandy is shocked to learn her ex-husband (Matt McCoy) is planning to marry a very young patient.
2	2	"A Lesson in Life"	Andy Cadiff	Susan Beavers	September 21, 1991	22.4
A patient helps Julie with her phobias; Laverne convinces Sandy to go on a date; Gina helps a patient reunite with his brother; and the doctors try to cure Greg's bad attitude.
3	3	"This Joint Is Jumpin'"	Andy Cadiff	Danny Smith	September 28, 1991	19.3
A new doctor frames Greg for the theft of some missing drugs; Sandy gets mad at a patient (Nancy Lenehan) who is ignoring her mother (Angela Paton); and Annie worries she may be pregnant.
4	4	"Coming to America"	Andy Cadiff	Bruce Ferber	October 5, 1991	19.7
Gina's father is coming to visit and worried that he might disapprove of her life alone, she tells him that she has a fiancee—so she enlists Hank to play the part. Little does she know that he expects her to get married before he leaves the country. Meanwhile, a soap opera actor (John O'Hurley) checks into the hospital and causes a spectacle, and an elderly patient refuses to sign a consent form.
5	5	"Reversal of Grandpa"	Andy Cadiff	Billy Van Zandt & Jane Milmore	October 12, 1991	19.4
The staff take turns talking to an accident victim (Tom Virtue) in hopes he will come out of his coma.
6	6	"Mother, Jugs, and Zach"	Andy Cadiff	Billy Van Zandt & Jane Milmore	October 19, 1991	17.3
Sandy must look after her ex-husband's new fiancée (Jeri Ryan); Annie's son is getting into trouble at school; Gina sneaks a dog onto the floor to comfort a burn victim; and Julie helps a senile patient.
7	7	"Dead Nurse"	Andy Cadiff	Susan Harris	October 26, 1991	15.6
Annie's boss tells her she has to drop her plans and cover a shift, so Annie tells her to drop dead—and she does.
8	8	"Kind, Konsiderate Kare"	Andy Cadiff	Danny Smith	November 2, 1991	19.3
A high-ranking member of the Ku Klux Klan check into the hospital with a medical condition, then collapses in the hallway, leaving Annie to perform mouth-to-mouth resuscitation on him. Another patient is a sexist construction worker who sat on a nail gun – so the female staff finds a way to get even with his snide remarks. Greg is smitten with a lady patient he's seeing… until her husband shows up.
9	9	"Begone with the Wind"	Andy Cadiff	Bruce Ferber	November 9, 1991	27.0
Chaos breaks out in the hospital during a hurricane – the kitchen's flooded, the phones are out, and the roads are closed. So when Rose Nyland shows up to help, she's immediately stuck with Julie and the duo are assigned to gathering food from the patients – food that they later give to Laverne for the pediatrics ward. When the news arrives that the roof collapses in a burning building, Annie fears that her husband, a fireman, may have been killed. Sandy runs into a man with a broken leg, whom she dumped. Hank and Gina get trapped in an elevator and share a romantic moment. Two rival gangs start a knife-fight in front of the nurses' station (and threaten Rose) so it's Paco to the rescue.
10	10	"An Intern-al Affair to Remember"	Andy Cadiff	Debbie Pearl & Cassandra Clark	November 16, 1991	20.7
Sandy must decide if she wants to move to Minnesota with her new boyfriend (Brian McNamara); a patient confuses her medicine because she can't read; and Greg overacts in a training video.
11	11	"Seize the Date"	Andy Cadiff	Mitchell Hurwitz	November 23, 1991	16.6
Hank's brother (Lane Davies) visits and falls in love with Gina; Julie makes friends with a selfish patient; and a hospital administrator tries to prove Dr. Riskin isn't billing poor patients for their tests.
12	12	"Friends and Lovers"	Andy Cadiff	Dianne Dixon & Peter Tilden	December 7, 1991	18.8
Annie decides to leave her children in the care of Sandy if she and her husband ever die, but as soon as the papers are signed, Annie starts criticizing Sandy's habits and lifestyle. Meanwhile, Julie falls for a doctor who turns out to be an escaped mental patient (Fred Willard); and Greg announces that he has the ability to shapeshift.
13	13	"Love, Death, and the Whole Damn Thing"	Andy Cadiff	Susan Harris	December 14, 1991	16.6
Julie's first lover, Peter (Adam Arkin), checks into 3 West, and the two immediately start catching up on old times, with Peter revealing all the women he's slept with. But when Dr. Risken arrives to break the news that Peter's indiscriminate bed-hopping has left him a brief time to live with AIDS, he's enraged and Julie's freaked out. Julie, deathly afraid of catching AIDS, first avoids him but later lets him know that he won't be alone when he dies. Meanwhile, Annie's mother-in-law moves in with her.
14	14	"No Hiding Place"	Terry Hughes	Bob Underwood	January 4, 1992	21.2
A mentally unstable patient (Larry Linville) is told that he has to cut sulfides out of his diet, so he responds by taking the staff hostage at gunpoint...which doesn't sit well with Sandy, who was supposed to be off on a big date.
15	15	"Sphere Today, Gone Tomorrow"	Terry Hughes	Tom Straw	January 11, 1992	18.5
Hank gets testy with everyone when he discovers a lump in his scrotum... and then accidentally announces his news over the P.A. Dr. Riskin takes Julie's advice and stands up to the medical director, who then quits leaving her to fill his position.
16	16	"The Truth Shall Screw You Up"	Terry Hughes	Susan Beavers	February 1, 1992	16.9
Sandy's mother (K Callan) arrives for a visit and immediately starts to complain, so Sandy attempt to mend their relationship but quickly finds that her mother is unwilling to cooperate. Meanwhile, Gina is infuriated with Hank when she discovers that he recently dated a patient who was just admitted.
17	17	"Married to the Mop"	Terry Hughes	Danny Smith	February 8, 1992	15.4
Paco becomes indebted to a mob boss; Gina tries to make Hank jealous by dating another man (Richard Burgi), unaware that he is gay.
18	18	"Eat Something"	Terry Hughes	Mitchell Hurwitz	February 15, 1992	14.3
When one patient is discharged and killed moments later by an ambulance, and another is crushed by a crane in a freak accident, Annie begins to question her faith in God. Meanwhile, as a result of the chicken in the "Vulcan Surprise" at a Star Trek convention, a bunch of loony Trekkies are admitted to the hospital with food poisoning.
19	19	"Catch a Fallen Star"	Terry Hughes	Danny Smith	February 22, 1992	14.2
A former child star, Chet "Poofie" McGuire (Stephen Furst), comes to the hospital to research his new role for the sitcom "Poofie McGuire, Nurse for Hire." Greg's star-struck, but everyone else is annoyed – particularly Annie, who has to take Chet on rounds with her. But Chet's attitude changes when he witnesses the staff revive a dying man. Meanwhile, Julie goes on a "holy quest" to track down the brother of that dying man and Dr. Riskin fends off an obnoxious mother who's giving her son high blood-pressure.
20	20	"Moon Over Miami"	Terry Hughes	Bob Underwood	February 29, 1992	21.4
The entire staff is pulled in to cover a double-shift during the full moon. Julie tells her co-workers about her grandmother's theory on the full moon – how it's a chance to make up for missed love opportunities. Sandy finds herself falling for Charlie Deitz. Paco decides that he's going to ask out Gina. Hank wants to ask out a slut… but he changes his tune when Gina attacks him and sticks her tongue down his throat in the elevator. A hernia-surgery patient (Raye Birk) makes repeated attempts at escaping; a former astronaut (Tim Thomerson) arrives with a bump on the head; and Blanche Devereaux tracks down Dr. Riskin because she can't get a man to bed her.
21	21	"Rude Awakenings"	Terry Hughes	Tom Straw	April 25, 1992	15.4
When a patient (George Coe) comes out of a 38-year coma, Dr. Riskin shocks the staff by telling them she was once engaged to the man, and that they had a son.
22	22	"The Ex-Factor"	Terry Hughes	David Rosenthal	May 2, 1992	16.7
Gina realizes Hank is still carrying a torch for his ex-wife; Greg is trapped in the elevator with a cannibal.

=== Season 2 (1992–93) ===
No. overall	No. in season	Title	Directed by	Written by	Original release date	Viewers (millions)
23	1	"Slime and Punishment"	Robert Berlinger	Tom Straw	September 19, 1992	18.7
Shady businessman Jack Trenton is court-ordered to do community service at the hospital. Enraged Annie goes to complain, but ends up getting an ultimatum from her boss – she has one week to get her coworkers' respect or her butt gets the boot. Annie later confronts Jack about his inability to follow orders, and initially has him arrested, until it occurs to her that it may put her job in further jeopardy. Meanwhile, Gina lets Hank know that she's unhappy about his recent interest in his ex-wife.
24	2	"In My New Country"	Robert Berlinger	Tom Reeder	September 26, 1992	17.7
Laverne checks into 3 West to have her webbed toes fixed, but when Sandy gets wind of the situation, toes aren't the only things being separated. Gina, hopped up on recently becoming a US citizen, vows to track down the slumlord that owns Paco's building… which turns out to be Jack Trenton. Luke and Hank butt heads over Luke's problem with authority.
25	3	"Inside Information"	Robert Berlinger	Susan Beavers	October 3, 1992	15.1
Sandy, who has become increasingly hostile, is pressured by Julie and Annie to see a psychiatrist. Jack and Hank try to gain inside stock information from a comatose patient.
26	4	"The Bad Boy in the Plastic Bubble"	Robert Berlinger	Boyd Hale	October 10, 1992	17.8
The staff has to come in for half a day to take a seminar on proper waste disposal because Jack's been throwing hazardous waste in the regular trash bins. Jack, as a "volunteer," worms his way out of showing up, and rubs everyone's noses in it. So Luke tells Jack that he may have been contaminated by a toxic substance, and cons him into spending time in a plastic bubble... wearing only a diaper. Meanwhile, Annie's hawking chocolate for her son, and Hank agrees to buy two cases – but he can't even afford one bar.
27	5	"Julie Gets Validated"	Robert Berlinger	Boyd Hale	October 17, 1992	15.3
Julie arrives late for work because she spent the night with the parking lot attendant. Jack suddenly becomes smitten with Julie when rumor spreads (and gets twisted) that Julie had sex in the parking garage. For fun, Hank sneaks up on Luke and winds up getting punched. Hank becomes the hospital joke and loses his self-confidence – and his ability to gain an erection.
28	6	"Annie's Choice"	Robert Berlinger	Danny Smith	October 24, 1992	13.6
Annie gets to go on a second honeymoon, so she leaves Julie in charge—which really ticks off Sandy and Gina. Jack tries to con a dying patient (Eric Christmas) out of his beloved railroad-watch.
29	7	"Playing Doctor"	Robert Berlinger	Tom Straw	October 31, 1992	17.3
Sandy is a hero—and a laughing stock—for performing mouth-to-mouth on the Weston's dog, Dreyfus, when he nearly drowned at a Halloween party. Meanwhile Gina gets suspended for giving a neighbor's child her prescription medicine.
30	8	"Dirty Laundry"	Robert Berlinger	Michael Kagan	November 7, 1992	16.2
Geraldo Rivera shows up as a patient at the hospital, and everyone is giddy with excitement—except Jack, who's sure the journalist has shown up to do an exposé on him. So Jack tries to get Paco to take incriminating photos of Geraldo for blackmail purposes. Turns out Geraldo really is there for a story—about the mysterious packages of laundry that keep being placed in the dumpster.
31	9	"Illicit Transfers"	Robert Berlinger	Danny Smith	November 14, 1992	16.5
Jack "donates" $20,000 for the new maternity wing in hopes of getting Annie transferred. But he only ends up getting himself transferred—to the morgue.
32	10	"Our Fred"	Robert Berlinger	Story by : Susan Beavers; Teleplay by : Danny Smith	November 21, 1992	16.6
Annie hooks up her husband, Fred, with Hank for a ballgame in hopes of getting him interested in getting out of the house. But her plan works all too well when Fred and Hank begin spending more time together than she hoped for. Meanwhile, Jack discovers a patient (Peter Scolari) is a former associate of his—who ratted him out to the feds.
33	11	"One Pequeno, Two Pequeno"	Robert Berlinger	Tom Straw	December 5, 1992	15.8
Gina's sister, Yolanda (Salma Hayek), comes to the USA for a visit, and Hank agrees to take her on rounds with him, thinking she's homely. When she arrives and everyone sees what a knockout she is, the guys drool over her and the ladies are jealous. To Hank's surprise, Yolanda is more than a little interested in him, and Gina walks in on the two after Yolanda has removed her dress in an attempt to seduce him.
34	12	"Solitary Man"	Robert Berlinger	Tom Reeder	December 12, 1992	16.1
Julie throws Luke a surprise birthday party, to his annoyance. So he decides to give her a glimpse of his world by taking her to a remote cave where he claims he likes to hang out. Meanwhile, Jack agrees to look for Annie's lost wedding ring in return for her taking some hours off of his community service time, but what Annie doesn't realize is that Jack's got her ring in his pocket.
35	13	"Caught Short"	Robert Berlinger	Tom Reeder	January 2, 1993	17.1
Gina is asked to hold the money for an office pool about a baby's delivery date. With all that cash, Gina succumbs to the temptation to spend it on a necklace. She has to find ways to replace the money before the baby comes, or before the others find out. In the end it turns out Gina won the baby pool and gets to keep the necklace.
36	14	"If I Were a Rich Man"	Robert Berlinger	Michael Kagan	January 9, 1993	18.3
Sandy buys a calendar with naked men in it because she thinks the Mr. February or Dusty Bottoms is Luke, so now all the girls wonder and try to find out by asking Paco to help out if Luke is Dusty or not. Jack dares Hank to be rich.
37	15	"Gropes of Wrath"	Robert Berlinger	Michael Kagan	January 16, 1993	15.8
The nurses turn in a slimy supply-man for sexual harassment. Meanwhile, Paco himself gets turned in for harassment when he gets tongue-tied in front of gorgeous a candy-striper and asks her to "feel me."
38	16	"Super Bowl"	Lax Passaris	Danny Smith	January 30, 1993	N/A
Hank throws a Super Bowl party, which all his coworkers attend... including Jack, who gave up his box seats to attend. But a bounced check leaves Hank without TV and Paco injured when he tries to illegally hook up cable. So the friends settle on an evening of karaoke.
39	17	"The Devil and the Deep Blue Sea"	Gil Junger	Danny Smith	February 6, 1993	10.8
Sandy reluctantly agrees to go on a date with Jack. They spend the evening on a riverboat casino where Sandy sees how big of a shark Jack really is.
40	18	"Love and Death"	Robert Berlinger	Boyd Hale	February 13, 1993	9.9
Julie makes up her mind that she's going to break up with Carl, but she changes her tune when he proposes marriage. Meanwhile, Jack's snapped out of his depression when he receives a death threat, Hank solicits Gina for a ride home, and Luke becomes enamored by an overgrown spleen that was donated to the hospital.
41	19	"Family Outing"	Lax Passaris	Michael Davidoff & Bill Rosenthal	February 20, 1993	10.2
Hank's father (William Daniels) arrives and reveals that he's gay. Hank freaks out at first, but feels bad about it, so he attends his father's retirement party—where he outs his Dad to all his associates. Meanwhile there's someone stealing food from the break room fridge and Julie sets out to find the culprit—which turns out to be Jack.
42	20	"When Hank Met Gina"	Peter D. Beyt	Steve Elkins	February 27, 1993	11.0
Paco wins the lottery and decides to bank the money and keep his job—until Jack talks him into quitting. But turns out there were many more winners than Paco anticipated, leaving him with virtually nothing. Jack is uninterested in helping Paco get his job back—until he realizes that Paco won't be replaced and he'll be stuck doing all the work. Meanwhile Hank and Gina share a moment during one of their study-dates... which leads to dinner... which leads to sex.
43	21	"Sting of Hearts"	Gil Junger	Danny Smith	April 3, 1993	12.1
It slips that Gina had sex with Hank, and now Hank's being clingy and obsessive, particularly when Gina hits it off with an attractive immigrant she bumps into in the elevator. Meanwhile, Jack delves back into insider trading—with Gina's new boyfriend.
44	22	"What Are Friends For?"	Peter D. Beyt	Mark Nutter	April 10, 1993	9.2
Annie sets up Sandy with a family friend (Patrick Warburton), but when the date goes horribly, neither Annie nor Sandy can cop to it. Meanwhile, Jack thinks that he killed a patient, unaware that the man was already dead, so he points the finger at Paco.
45	23	"Smokin' in the Boys Room"	Robert Berlinger	Boyd Hale	May 1, 1993	7.1
Jack and Paco spend their time slacking off in an empty room in an unfinished wing, but their hiding place is discovered when they have to save a construction worker who's swinging out-of-control outside the window. Meanwhile Luke has to tend to the nun from Hell (Kathleen Freeman) and Hank tries to get Gina back into bed.
46	24	"Jumpin' Jack Flash"	Tom Straw	Tom Straw	May 1, 1993	8.6
Being careless, Jack gets electrocuted and dies. As the staff works feverishly to revive him, Jack battles for his life by trying to beat the angel of death (Fred Applegate) at a game of Monopoly. Meanwhile Gina tells Hank that she's pregnant.

=== Season 3 (1993–94) ===
No. overall	No. in season	Title	Directed by	Written by	Original release date	Viewers (millions)
47	1	"The Eagle Has Landed"	Gil Junger	Tom Straw	September 25, 1993	18.8
The hospital is sold to the Healthweb Corporation, and the new owner, Mr. Waites (Leslie Jordan), pulls one of his hotel managers to be the new corporate representative of the hospital. The new rep, Casey MacAfee (Loni Anderson), disguises herself as a patient for "research" and proceeds to annoy the staff. When Mr. Waites arrives, he gives Casey a promotion for her good work – he puts her in charge of the hospital as the administrator. Meanwhile, Gina finally announces her pregnancy (though at 5 months, it's more than obvious), and Hank finally proposes. And Jack begins his obsession with Casey, who begins her obsession with Harry Weston…
48	2	"Send in the Gowns"	Gil Junger	Boyd Hale	October 2, 1993	15.1
Casey orders new, obnoxiously-loud, yellow hospital gowns, much to Annie's chagrin. Patients begin complaining that the new gowns are making them itch, so Paco and Jack are assigned to wash them. But after Paco puts the gowns in the dryer, it's discovered that they're flammable. When Mr. Waites shows that he's not happy with the flaming gown situation, Casey lets Jack take the blame. Meanwhile Hank tries to find a romantic way to re-propose to Gina, and he settles on a barbershop quartet... but Gina's taken a leave of absence and disappeared. And Julie points out to Annie, that she would rather "swing" like a gate than confront Casey.
49	3	"Intruders"	Gil Junger	Tom Reeder	October 9, 1993	17.0
Casey spies on the staff by installing a security camera in front of the nurse's station, and everyone begins "performing for the spycamera." Annie keeps trying to express her discomfort with the camera, but Casey keeps giving her the brush-off – so Annie jerks it off the wall. Meanwhile, Hank tries to locate Gina, but Julie's the only one who knows that she's returned to her native homeland. Jack passes himself off as a doctor to get into the doctors' lounge – but he ends up in surgery.
50	4	"Jack's Indecent Proposal"	Gil Junger	Tom Reeder	October 16, 1993	13.9
Casey ponders Jack's offer to pay her a million dollars to sleep with him. After learning that Annie thinks she "has no scruples," Casey takes Jack up on his offer. Meanwhile, Hank enlists Charlie Dietz's help in booking a trip to San Pokeno to find Gina.
51	5	"Bring Me, the Head of Hank Kaplan"	Gil Junger	Mark Nutter	October 23, 1993	14.5
Even though Gina's father (Gregory Sierra) has threatened to kill him, Hank decides the best defense is a good offense and arranges to meet the family. Back in Miami, Jack decides that actually working will make time pass much more quickly, and Julie bonds with (and sucks up to) Casey in an attempt to obtain more vacation time.
52	6	"Snowball's Chance"	Gil Junger	Danny Smith	October 30, 1993	15.7
Wanting to fit in with her new co-workers, Casey invites the staff to a Halloween party in her home, where she shows off her snow-globe collection. Julie, who has issues confronting Casey, steals one of the snowballs... and Jack gets blamed. Hank gives Paco a box of his "guy stuff" Gina was throwing away, that includes a very valuable baseball card.
53	7	"The Bridges of Dade Country"	Tom Straw	Tom Straw	November 6, 1993	17.2
Annie finds herself more than a little attracted to a charming patient. Casey has a date with Harry Weston, which Jack sets out to sabotage by holding Hank's bachelor party at the same restaurant. Hank thinks Jack has hired a stripper, so when an attractive woman sits beside him, he has no idea that she's a cop looking to bust someone for soliciting prostitution.
54	8	"No, But I Played One on TV"	Gil Junger	Boyd Hale	November 13, 1993	16.1
Casey gets a group of former TV doctors (including Vince Edwards and Larry Linville) to attend the ribbon-cutting ceremony for the new maternity wing. Jack, whose first marriage was essentially ruined by Chad Everett, becomes even more distraught when he saves a choking woman (Amy Hill), and she credits Everett as the hero.
55	9	"Temporary Setbacks"	Gil Junger	Danny Smith	November 20, 1993	14.3
Jack tries to show his time in the hospital hasn't dulled his ability to scheme by getting a New York cheesecake delivered to the heliport along with a liver that's arriving for transplant - so Casey and Annie join forces to humiliate him. Meanwhile, Casey decides that "Community Medical Center" isn't an appealing name for the hospital, so she decides to change it; and Hank and Gina attend Lamaze class, where they bicker and run into a very pregnant Carol Weston and her coach, Sophia Petrillo.
56	10	"The Birth of a Marriage"	Gil Junger	Barbara Brooks Wallace & Thomas R. Wolfe	November 27, 1993	17.2
After Jack gets caught in a lie regarding a sprained shoulder, nobody believes him when he injures himself sliding on a wet floor. Dr. Harry Weston finds Jack writhing on the floor and confirms that he actually is hurt, so they get him a room. Meanwhile, Hank and Gina argue over the details of their wedding, but the point is moot when Gina goes into labor and they have to be wedded by the hospital chaplain.
57	11	"The Shift of the Magi"	Gil Junger	Danny Smith	December 18, 1993	14.6
Casey tells everyone that they got fabulous gifts for Christmas, so they go out of their way to get her something nice. But when the box arrives, she finds that it's filled with padded hangers. Meanwhile, Jack is forced to play Santa in the hospital - though he later plays Santa out of the goodness of his heart; and Hank realizes that he had made arrangements to work on Christmas months prior.
58	12	"Paco Gets Maced"	Gil Junger	Mark Nutter	January 8, 1994	13.4
Casey accidentally maces Paco, and a disreputable attorney sees an opportunity to make a fortune by suing her and the hospital. Meanwhile, Julie takes over as the new editor of the hospital newsletter; and new father Hank is found napping all over the hospital.
59	13	"Parental Guidance Suggested"	Gil Junger	Barbara Brooks Wallace & Thomas R. Wolfe	January 15, 1994	14.6
Jack's son visits and announces he is going to Guatemala with the Peace Corps—a decision that doesn't sit well with Jack. Meanwhile Hank, worn out from being a new parent, oversleeps and doesn't get the baby to the babysitter. Instead of letting Gina think he's irresponsible, he convinces his co-workers to tend to the baby without letting Gina find out.
60	14	"Mi Casa, Su Casa"	Gil Junger	Tom Reeder	January 22, 1994	14.6
An argument with their apartment manager gets the Kaplans evicted; Casey bribes Paco to spy on Jack.
61	15	"Fly the Friendly Skies"	Gil Junger	Mark Nutter	February 5, 1994	13.7
Jack and Paco sneak off to Bassau on Jack's jet, only to be hijacked by a disgruntled employee (Richard Belzer); Casey loses a contact lens but is too vain to wear her glasses.
62	16	"Don't Hit the Road, Jack"	Gil Junger	Christine Zander	February 12, 1994	12.4
When Jack finally stops asking Casey out, she can't stand the rejection and reluctantly sets out to seduce him.
63	17	"Bury the Hatchets"	Gil Junger	Mark Nutter	March 5, 1994	12.6
Casey gets auctioned off for at a charity auction, and gets a $40,000 date... with Jack. She expects a big romantic evening at a fancy restaurant, but Jack has different plans—miniature golf. Meanwhile Gina's father, Vargas, drops in for a surprise visit and he uses the opportunity to continuously belittle Hank. But in the end Vargas and Hank become friends.
64	18	"Nothin' Says Lovin"	Gil Junger	Boyd Hale	March 12, 1994	13.2
Tired of being stuck in an orderly's position, Jack demands that he be transferred to another position. So Casey reassigns him to the cafeteria, where he spends his time being pursued by the domineering head of the kitchen, Ms. Gump. Hank and Gina are starting to irritate each other so they seek Annie's advice about their marital problems. And Julie tries to pass off her zit, which she's been picking at, as a "bunny bite."
65	19	"Silent Partner"	Gil Junger	Barbara Brooks Wallace & Thomas R. Wolfe	April 9, 1994	12.6
Jack tries to pass Paco off as a business partner to impress a Cuban businessman (Henry Darrow), but the man's wife ruins everything when she makes a pass at Paco.
66	20	"The One After the Earthquake"	Tom Straw	Tom Straw	April 16, 1994	11.4
A student nurse decides she wants to emulate Casey; a hypochondriac can't accept turning 40; a man has a throat operation because he sounds like Jack Nicholson; Jack and Paco fight; Julie loses a patient.
67	21	"The Big Jack Attack"	Gil Junger	Danny Smith	April 23, 1994	12.2
Jack's offer to "take care of" a corporate hatchet man (Joe Flaherty) is misunderstood when the man turns up dead.
68	22	"All the Pretty Caseys"	Tom Straw	Barbara Brooks Wallace & Thomas R. Wolfe	May 7, 1994	12.2
Casey quits to take a new job, only to realize that her new boss (Adam West) hired her only for her looks.
