= Mary Jo Keenen =

American television actress

- Born: Westfield, New Jersey, U.S.
- Other name: Mary Jo Hurwitz
- Occupation: Actress
- Years active: 1986–1999
- Spouse: Mitchell Hurwitz (m. 1999)
- Children: 2

Mary Jo Keenen is an American former television actress.

== Career ==
She had regular roles as Nurse Julie Milbury on the sitcom Nurses, Gloria Elgis on the sitcom City and Stephanie James on My Wildest Dreams. She appeared as Deena in three episodes of Seinfeld, and she also guest-starred on Search for Tomorrow, Broken Badges, The Commish and The John Larroquette Show. Her most recent TV role was on Everybody Loves Raymond in 1999.

== Personal life ==
Born to parents George E. and Lucille Keenen, and raised in Westfield, New Jersey, Keenen attended Westfield High School, where she performed in the school's stage productions. She then majored in theater at Marymount Manhattan College.

She has been married to writer and producer Mitchell Hurwitz since 1999. They have two daughters: May Asami, born in 2000, and Phoebe Hitomi born in 2002.
