= Stephanie Hodge =

American actress

- Born: December 24, 1956 (age 69); Wilmington, Ohio, U.S.
- Occupations: Actress, voice actress, comic, writer
- Years active: 1988–present
- Spouse: Lance Lyon (m. 1992)
- Children: 1

Stephanie Hodge (born December 24, 1956) is an American actress and stand-up comedian, known for her roles as Nurse Sandy Miller in the NBC sitcom Nurses from 1991 to 1993 and Jennie Malloy on the WB sitcom Unhappily Ever After from 1995 to 1998.

== Early life and career ==
Hodge was born in Wilmington, Ohio, the daughter of a college professor and schoolteacher. She attended Wilmington College and Ohio University in Athens, OH. In 1980s, she began working as a stand-up comedian, and appeared in films including Big Top Pee-wee (1988) and I, Madman (1989). In 1990, Hodge made her television debut with co-starring role on the short-lived CBS sitcom Sugar and Spice. Later, she starred alongside Cynthia Stevenson in the syndicated variety comedy My Talk Show. In 1991, she released her stand-up comedy special, Stephanie Hodge: Straight Up.

In 1991, Hodge went to star in the NBC sitcom Nurses, a spin-off of The Golden Girls. The show was created by Susan Harris as a star vehicle for Hodge, but later was more ensemble cast. She left the series in 1993, after two seasons. The following year, she went to star in the CBS sitcom Muddling Through playing the role of ex-convict trying to turn her life around. The series received negative reviews and was canceled after one season. In 1995, she began starring alongside Geoff Pierson in The WB sitcom Unhappily Ever After. The series was initially supposed to be a starring vehicle for Hodge, whose character Jennie was the focus of the first few episodes. The series concept was later re-worked. By the show's third season, Nikki Cox became a breakout character. The producers tried to kill off Jennie's increasingly-unnecessary character and return her as a ghost; negative audience reaction made them quickly reverse this action. The character was brought back to life in a deliberately-bizarre sequence in which a network executive wandered onto the set and announced that she was no longer dead. Nevertheless, Hodge decided to leave the show in 1998, and several episodes after Jennie's bizarre reappearance, she abandoned her family for a lesbian lover and was never seen again.

After leaving Unhappily Ever After, Hodge appeared in the 2001 science fiction film Evolution. The following years, she guest-starred in a number of sitcoms, including Reba, The Suite Life of Zack and Cody, The War at Home, Dog with a Blog, and on several episodes of Funny or Die. Her dramatic credits include NCIS, Bones, Scandal and The Rookie.

== Personal life ==
She has been married to Lance Lyon since 1992. They have one daughter named Harper.

== Filmography ==
Year	Title	Role	Notes
1988	Big Top Pee-wee	Mermaid	
1989	I, Madman	Mona	
1990	Sugar and Spice	Bonnie Buttram	Series regular, 7 episodes
1990	Almost an Angel	Diner Waitress	
1990–1991	My Talk Show	Angela Davenport	Series regular, 59 episodes
1991–1993	Nurses	Nurse Sandy Miller	Series regular, 46 episodes
1994	Muddling Through	Connie Drego	Series regular, 10 episodes
1995–1998	Unhappily Ever After	Jennie Malloy	Series regular, 77 episodes
2001	Evolution	Jill Mason	
2003	Reba	Career Counselor	Episode: "The Best and the Blondest"
2004	NCIS	Sheriff Charlene Dupray	Episode: "The Good Samaritan"
2004	Combustion	Stella	TV movie
2005	The Suite Life of Zack and Cody	Brianna's Mom	Episode: "The Fairest of Them All"
2005	Twins	Rita	1 episode
2006	The War at Home	Rachel	Episode: "Snow Job"
2006	One on One	Jackie	Episode: "California Girl"
2008	Yes Man	Ticket Lady	
2010	Good Luck Charlie	Miss Covington	Episode: "Double Whammy"
2013–2014	Dog with a Blog	Gator	Episodes: "Tyler Gets a Grillfriend" and "Will Sing for Food Truck"
2016	Bones	Janis Collins	Episode: "The Movie in the Making"
2018	Scandal	Clerk	Episode: "The List"
2018	The Rookie	Ricky	Episode: "Time of Death"
2019	NCIS: Los Angeles	Tangerine	Episode: "The Sound of Silence"
2020	Perry Mason	Betty	Episode: "Chapter Six"
2022	Young Sheldon	Pat	Episode: "A Lobster, an Armadillo and a Way Bigger Number"
2023	NCIS	Greta Ford, FLETC instructor	Episode: "Too Many Cooks"
2026	Jury Duty	Helen Schaffer	Series regular
