= World's Strictest Parents (American TV series) =

American reality television series

- Genre: Reality TV
- Based on: The World's Strictest Parents
- Narrated by: Mocean Melvin
- Composers: Ian Christian Nickus; Jeremy Sweet; Chaz DaBat Kkoshi; Tom Strahle; Matthew Richard Harris
- Country of origin: United States
- Original language: English
- No. of seasons: 2
- No. of episodes: 38

Production
- Executive producers: Dan Peirson; Jeff Cvengors; Nick Emmerson; Jennifer O'Connell; Melanie Moreau; Bob Kusbit
- Running time: 60 minutes
- Production company: Shed Media US

Original release
- Network: CMT
- Release: April 18, 2009 – December 17, 2010

World's Strictest Parents is an American reality television series that first aired on April 18, 2009, on CMT and concluded on December 17, 2010.

The series is based on the original British version of The World's Strictest Parents that was first broadcast on BBC Three in 2008.

== Synopsis ==
The program shows two troubled teenagers who are sent to live with strict host families for one week to try and change their attitudes, outlooks, life path and behavior in general. The teens must abide by the house rules set by their host family, common examples include; dressing modestly, no smoking, no drinking, no profanity, participation in religious worship, and helping out with household chores for the duration of their stay. The host parents will usually confiscate any contraband found to violate house rules, such as packets of cigarettes, lighters, alcoholic beverages and electronic devices (eg. iPods and cellphones) before formally entering the house. Many teens will try and break the house rules by testing the boundaries of the host parents, usually swearing, sneaking outside to smoke cigarettes, refusing or putting minimal effort into chores assigned to them. They face consequences and strange punishments as a result including: swimming in sewer water with sewer sharks, walking around by carrying a water slosh-pipe, push-ups, cutting a red-painted stump, running around the cones, cleaning manure, extra chores, boot camp, staying outside of the porch on cold weather and other numerous punishments by the strict host parents. During the week, they receive a letter from their real parents with a list of issues they should try to resolve.

At the beginning of the episode, we see how the teenagers live their lives, with the teens often disrespecting the parents and behaving badly, even in some instances being violent or abusive towards their parents.

"I have been more a friend than a parent to Garrett"

— Garrett's mother, from Season 1, Episode 6

The teens naturally witness huge shock when arriving at the house of the new parents, compared to the lack of rules they have at home, so they think that they can have their own way, but they realise reality is different; which is why punishments are frequent.

Most teenagers on the show are often smokers, drinkers, delinquents, spoiled, unemployed and in some cases; drug addicts.

Unlike most versions (including the original British series), in which teenagers were sent to stay overseas, the American series had the teenagers remain within the United States for five days, as the program was produced with a reduced cable network budget rather than that of a national broadcast network, and legal issues as some episodes would likely feature subjects which would not meet passport regulations. Another difference from the aforementioned versions above that their own parents came to collect them, and evaluated the stay with the host family at the end of each episode.

== Syndication ==
The success of the program led to many overseas versions being created including in the Americas (broadcast by CMT) (part of MTV Networks) the CMT episodes frequently rebroadcasting on MTV.

== Seasons ==
=== Season 1 (2009–2010) ===
| Episode title | Production code | Teenagers | Parents | Notes | Original airdate |
|---|---|---|---|---|---|
| The Vinton Family | 101 | 17-year-old Brittani Elder from Santa Clarita, California and 15-year-old Ivan from Queens, New York | Scott and Lisa Vinton in Murrieta, California | The host family is a blended family. The Vinton's' eldest daughter is Scott's stepdaughter. When Lisa and Scott noticed that there was a cigarette, Lisa and Scott found out about Brittani and Ivan bringing cigarettes in the house. Lisa identified that Ivan and Brittani were lying. However, Lisa and Scott went to the room to search for Ivan's cellphone and cigarettes that he had. Lisa demanded Ivan to give a lighter to her, but he threatened to burn the house down. Scott waited for Ivan to give a lighter to him, a few minutes later, he gave a lighter to Scott. | 18 April 2009 |
| The Hatcher Family | 102 | 16-year-old Reed Roberts from Mesa, Arizona and 16-year-old Jessica Motto from Phoenix, Arizona | Charlie and Sharon Hatcher (farmers) in College Grove, Tennessee | Reed and Jessica were two 16-year-olds, both from Phoenix metropolitan area. After Reed drove the Hatchers' pick-up truck with Jessica joining him, both teens were punished by cleaning the cow manure off the concrete in the barn. After that, Sharon decided to search the rooms of both teens, finding nothing in Reed's room, but cigarettes in Jessica's room. Jessica cursed Sharon out after hearing Sharon say that she would rip her cigarettes apart. They later made amends. In 2026, Charlie Hatcher defeated Rep. Andy Ogles in the Republican primary for Tennessee's 5th congressional district and would later go on to win the election in November, defeating Democrat Chaz Molder. | 25 April 2009 |
| The McCuin Family | 103 | 18-year-old Richard "Ricky" Zona III from Laguna Beach, California and 16-year-old Katie Bryant from Mesa, Arizona | Steve and Angie McCuin in Portland, Tennessee | Ricky is seen repeatedly breaking the "no lying" rule in the episode. Later, he removed his pants in the bowling alley in front of Katie and the McCuins' children. This being against the dress code, Steve punished Ricky by ordering him to paint the whole chapel. A year after the episode aired, Steve and Angie divorced and Steve remarried a woman named Michelle and share 3 children together. | 2 May 2009 |
| The Helton Family | 104 | 16-year-old Whitney Uicker from Redington Beach, Florida and 16-year-old Stephen Dupree from Clearwater, Florida | Paul and Dana Helton in Medina, Tennessee | The first U.S. episode where two teens did not bring any prohibited items to be confiscated. Whitney and Stephen are 16-year-olds, both from Tampa Bay area. Paul tried to wake Stephen up in the morning, and Stephen can't get himself up out of bed. When Stephen and Whitney smokes marijuana, Stephen throws an apple on the pond. Paul and Dana make Stephen and Whitney do their yard work, Stephen argues with Paul for doing all of his work and the weekly chores. Paul confronted Stephen to step down with his attitude over chores and he needed to be honest. Shortly after Paul speaks Stephen about his behavior, he noticed that there was an apple on the pond, so Paul asked Stephen and he admitted that he did throw an apple on the pond. When Whitney woke up from bed, she talked back at Paul about his annoying stories and the farm due to her headache. After Paul made a statement about Whitney's family being confused, she started yelling at him. When Whitney takes control of her emotions of her family, Paul gave an advice to Whitney about her family relationship. | 9 May 2009 |
| The Cork Family | 105 | 16-year-old Julie Fangatta from Tulsa, Oklahoma and 16-year-old Sebastian Geiger from Jenks, Oklahoma | David and Dana Cork in Statesboro, Georgia | The first U.S. episode with a Mormon family and the first U.S. episode with teens who do not get along. Julie and Sebastian are two 16-year-olds, both from Tulsa metropolitan area. Julie asked Sebastian to continue working in the yard, she swore at Sebastian. David heard Julie swear at Sebastian, David gave a chores jar to Julie and punished her by making her pick up the straws. Secondly, Julie also swears in front of the Corks' children, Dana gave a chores jar to Julie and punished her by cleaning up the toilet bowl. Also, Julie wears inapplicable outfits, but Dana cannot tolerate the dress code. After the episode aired, Sebastian Geiger passed away after getting shot while working in 2013. | 16 May 2009 |
| The Morrison Family | 106 | 16-year-old Adelle Beatty from Richmond, Texas and 17-year-old Garrett Tully from Orting, Washington | Daniel and Andrea Morrison (owners of a teen club) in McDonough, Georgia | This was the first U.S. episode where one of the host parents (Andrea) was African American. Andrea was apprehended that Adele was smoking a cigarette and she was lying, Andrea took her cigarette away from her for smoking. While Andrea and Daniel went out after Adele and Garrett told them to clean up in the teen club, Adele and Garrett were lazy and do nothing to clean up the teen club. Also, Adele cursed Andrea out in front of the 6-year-old of the family. After that, she apologized to both Andrea and her 6-year-old. After the episode aired, The Spotlight Teen Club was closed on May 30, 2010 after an incident where there was graffiti written on the walls while there was eggs being throwing in front of the teen club. | 23 May 2009 |
| The Rutherford Family | 107 | 18-year-old Desiree Velasquez from Glendale, Arizona and 15-year-old Brian Brockette from Grand Rapids, Michigan | Adam and Pamela Rutherford in Spanish Springs, Nevada | Brian and Desiree went out of the house without permission by Adam and Pamela. After they headed back to the house, Brian and Desiree were talking while Adam and Pamela ignore them during lunch with Rutherford's children. Brian left on day 2 after he refused to do his chores or his punishment, while Desiree threatened to leave in the same manner and eventually stayed until the end. After the episode aired, Brian Brockette passed away from a drug poisoning in 2014. In addition, one of the Rutherford children, Dylan Rutherfold passed away due to medical complications from a suicide attempt in 2017. Adam and Pamela have since separated. | 30 May 2009 |
| The Forsyth Family | 108 | 15-year-old Arielle Boaff from Los Angeles, California and 18-year-old Tyler Leister from Des Moines, Iowa | Terry and Roxanne Forsyth in Combs, Arkansas | Tyler wanted to be a chef when he grew up, so Terry put him to the test to see if he was chef ready by having him cook dinner. The whole family liked his food. After the episode aired, Austin (the one of the Forsyth children) who would marry Joy-Anna Duggar and later appeared in the reality show Counting On. | 6 June 2009 |
| The Bolton Family | 109 | 17-year-old Aja from Pasadena, California and 17-year-old Alex from Alhambra, California | Cliff and Lisa Bolton (coaches) in Bakersfield, California | This is the first U.S. episode where one of the troubled teens (Alex) was Hispanic American. Aja and Alex are two 17-year-olds, both from Greater Los Angeles area. First episode with the family travelled statewide. The Boltons use push-ups for discipline when their kids break rules. Alex had to do a total of 10 all for complaining about yard work. Aja had to do a total of 120 push-ups all for swearing (once for challenging the clothing rule, and three times for throwing fits, one fit over a closed-up piercing, one for defying the Boltons, and the third for being given 80 push-ups to do). After the episode aired, Lisa and Cliff have since divorced, and additionally, one of the Bolton children, Caleb Bolton passed away in November 2025. | 10 October 2009 |
| The Bilben Family | 110 | 17-year-old Jennifer Martin from Brooksville, Florida and 18-year-old Chad Weatherford from El Cajon, California | Gary and Theresa Bilben (restaurant owners) in Walker, Minnesota | This is the first U.S. episode where one of the wayward teens (Chad) lives with his grandparents rather than his own parents, and the first episode where the host parents asked the truck to go to their place of work instead of the house. Chad is seen breaking the "no smoking" rule. He got caught once by Gary, and so Chad had to clean empty garbage cans as punishment. After Jennifer read her letter, Theresa tried explaining to Jennifer how she could improve her life. However, Jennifer felt attacked by Theresa's honesty with the statement "you people make me feel like crap" Theresa was furious by that statement. | 17 October 2009 |
| The Wright Family | 111 | 16-year-old Sadie from Westport, Massachusetts and 18-year-old Nick Matula from Baltimore, Maryland | Sam and Amy Wright in Murfreesboro, Tennessee | When Sam and Amy confiscate their belongings away from Nick's luggage and Sadie's luggage, Nick admitted that he was lying about his cell phone in his pocket. Amy deals with Nick to have consequences for lying. Despite it all, Nick still wanted all of his stuff back from Sam and Amy. He threatened them that he wanted to kill someone, but Sam cannot grant Nick the wish of giving him back all of his stuff. After the episode aired, Sam and Amy have since divorced and each have remarried different people. | 24 October 2009 |
| The Manning Family | 112 | 17-year-old Audrey from Verona, New Jersey and 16-year-old Brent Combes from Bloomington, Indiana | Mark and Tammy Manning in Long Creek, Oregon | The Mannings right away confiscate the teen's bags of everything except toiletries and clothing for the next day. When Brent swears, Mark and Tammy punished him by making him move a stack of hay. When Mark and Tammy noticed Brent did not pull his pants up, Brent then loses his mattress after challenging the Mannings' rule on pants. Also, Audrey swore and Mark punished her by making her move a stack of hay. Brent then swears 20 times during the hangout with Audrey and Mannings' children and Tammy punished Brent by making him move a stack of hay. Both teens earn everything back as the week goes on. | 31 October 2009 |
| The Knight Family | 113 | 15-year-old Jackie from Lansdale, Pennsylvania and 17-year-old Spencer from Kansas City, Missouri | Scott and Penny Knight (juvenile probation officers) in Morristown, Tennessee | Spencer loses his bedroom door for refusing a pat-down. He also talks to someone from the military after challenging the (sir/ma'am) rule. Penny is a juvenile probation officer so she decided to take Spencer and Jackie to spend an hour at the juvenile facility where Penny works in order to show them where they may end up if they continue their rebellious behavior. After an hour like jury inmates, Spencer and Jackie were miserable and were woken to put an end to their rebellious ways. | 7 November 2009 |
| The Bouldin Family | 114 | 15-year-old Mackenzie and 15-year-old Ian Kreifels both from Omaha, Nebraska | Blake and Angie Bouldin (a pastor and householder) in Indian Trail, North Carolina | When Ian and Mackenzie walked away from Angie in a half second, Angie realized Ian was caught hiding cigarettes by Angie. After she finds the cigarettes, he swears at her. The teens also make a run for it in front of Angie, who threatens both of them with more consequences if they didn't stop where they were. Mackenzie did as she was told whereas Ian disobeyed, smoking during the runaway. Mackenzie did the yard work with Angie but did not enjoy spreading the mulch. Also, Angie found another cigarette from Ian's pocket. Angie punished Ian by doing his yard work. Ultimately, Blake came home from his meeting and he heard from Angie, and he was agitated and disappointed with Mackenzie and Ian for swearing in front of Angie and smoking cigarettes three times. However, Blake found a box of cigarettes from the nightlamp and also found it on the shelf. Blake and Angie were disappointed with Ian and Mackenzie's trust when he found a box of cigarettes and tells a lie to Blake and Angie. Blake punished Ian and Mackenzie by carrying branches and leaves to the truck bed. After the episode aired, Ian Kreifels passed away in 2024. | 14 November 2009 |
| The Gentrup Family | 115 | 16-year-old Cristiana from El Segundo, California and 17-year-old Ronnie Roulet from Cumming, Georgia | Jim and Janee Gentrup in Gilbert, Arizona | Ronnie and Cristiana talk back to Jim and Janee, then they were acting like adults in front of Gentrup's children, Jim punished Ronnie by doing 10 push-ups for backtalking and Janee demands Cristiana to sit outside in the driveway on the hot sun for backtalking. While Jim, Janee, and the Gentrup's children were playing basketball with Ronnie and Cristiana, she talks back again to Janee. Janee punished her by doing 10 push-ups for backtalking. Ronnie falsely stated that the Gentrups had better chances than his own parents which made Janee fume at him. | 21 November 2009 |
| The McCormick Family | 116 | 17-year-old Karli from Glendale, Arizona and 18-year-old Zach Smith from Louisville, Kentucky | Sean and Irene McCormick (a police officer and personal trainer) in Huxley, Iowa | When Karli and Zach vandalized the wall, Sean (a Des Moines Police Department police officer) was saddened when they painted the whole wall. Zach Smith was murdered in 2022. | 28 November 2009 |
| The Call Family | 117 | 16-year-old Ariel from Peachtree City, Georgia and 16-year-old Mark Eisler from O'Fallon, Missouri | Russ and Kim Call in Moab, Utah | Both teens were the same age. Mark has seen breaking rules one by one the minute Kim stated them. He also attempted to make a run for it when the rules became too much for him. At that point, Mark was forced to clean the toilet bowl after peeing on the toilet seat in response to having to sit to use the toilet. After Mark cleaned the toilet bowl, Russ told Mark about his classmates that were bullied him and called him a "killer". Russ gave a tough lesson to Mark that he won't pee on the toilet seat, swear at Call's children and disrespect him and his wife Kim. Ariel had to do all of Kim's jobs after she made a statement (Kim's job is not as hard as Russ’) that rubbed Kim the wrong way. | 5 December 2009 |
| The Smidt Family | 118 | 16-year-old Sierra from St. Paul Park, Minnesota and 18-year-old Anthony from White House, Tennessee | Jim and Sherene Smidt in Coeur d'Alene, Idaho | Sierra had a standoff all day one day for refusing to clean up after the Smidts' horses as punishment for cursing. | 12 December 2009 |
| The Ballard Family | 119 | 15-year-old Lilly from San Diego, California and 17-year-old Matt from Tustin, California | Dick and Denise Ballard in Ross, Ohio | This was the first U.S. episode where one of the troubled teens (Lilly) was Asian American. Both teens are from Southern California. Matt was caught texting by Dick, which made both parents realize that they still had their cell phones on them (breaking the "no cell phone" rule). Lily was also seen blowing up at Denise after being prompted and scolded for taking too long and sassing back. | 15 May 2010 |
| The Combes Family | 120 | 16-year-old Samantha from Mukilteo, Washington and 17-year-old Nick from Levittown, Pennsylvania | Mike and Karen Combes (Health-plex owners) in Cincinnati, Ohio | Nick blew up at Mike when he had enough of his punishment (cleaning off the racquetball court) for not following directions when he was first asked to follow them. Karen found cigarettes, Samantha admitted that she was bringing cigarettes. Eventually, Nick infuriates Mike after Karen took a cigarette from him. Nick was completely upset with Mike, while Karen escorts the host family's daughter Julia inside the house. | 22 May 2010 |
| The Brown Family | 121 | 16-year-old Shauna from Moreno Valley, California and 17-year-old Megan from Louisville, Kentucky | Mike and Pam Brown in Richmond, Virginia | First U.S. episode with two girls. When Shauna refused to say "yes, ma'am" to Pam, she punished Shauna by ordering her to shovel the snow off from the yard. The full episode currently cannot be found, but there are clips available on the YouTube channel. | 29 May 2010 |
| The Cooper Family | 122 | 16-year-old Victoria (Vicki) from Orlando, Florida and 18-year-old Caleb from DeSoto, Missouri | Ken and Sue Cooper in Ellicott City, Maryland | If the teens did not comply to the Coopers' house rules, their consequence was to sleep outside. | 5 June 2010 |
| The Carroll Family | 123 | 16-year-old Mary from Hudson, Florida and 17-year-old Wyatt from Riverside, California | Tom and Shonnie Carroll in Bumpass, Virginia | Subsequent, Mary cannot handle the chores, Mary left out of the house to smoke a cigarette in her hand while Shonnie follows her. After her refusal to do her chore in the bathroom as a punishment for cursing, Mary got her bathroom privileges confiscated, and her ability to go to the bathroom was limited to the Port-a-potty. During this episode, the footage shows their old house was burned down. After the episode aired, Tom Carroll passed away in 2024. | 12 June 2010 |
| The Sheffield Family | 124 | 15-year-old Danielle from Orlando, Florida and 17-year-old Chris from Westminster, California | Larry and Christy Sheffield in Spurger, Texas | Larry and Christy confiscate their belongings from Danielle's luggage and Chris's luggage, they found liquors and beer bottles in Chris's luggage, and also found inappropriate clothing in Danielle's luggage. During the yard work, Chris and Danielle walked away from Larry and Christy and decided not to continue their yard work for their farm. Larry and Christy gave consequences to Chris and Danielle by digging up the fence post. | 19 June 2010 |
| The Robinson Family | 125 | 17-year-old Antonia from Runnemede, New Jersey and 16-year-old Myles from Weston, Florida | Jeff and Yvonne Robinson in McDonough, Georgia | Yvonne notices Myles and Antonia seem to have good behavior. This is the only U.S. episode neither violated nor punished the troubled teens. | 26 June 2010 |
| The Wilcox Family | 126 | 15-year-old Stephanie from Lancaster, California and 16-year-old Matt from Rochelle Park, New Jersey | Jack and Patty Wilcox (teachers) in Jacksonville, Florida | Jack and Patty came in at respective teen's bedrooms teach them how to do the chores. Jack and Patty talked to Matt and Stephanie about their GPA which needs to increase the grades for their school which does not accumulate 1.6. Jack asked Matt to wear protective safety gear before going to the skate park, but Matt was upset and swore to wear protective safety gear because he tried to skate for a few attempts. In the end, Matt cleans the trash bin for swearing at Jack. After the episode aired, Jack Wilcox passed away in June 2023. | 3 July 2010 |
| The Toscano Family | 127 | 17-year-old Angela from Phoenix, Arizona and 17-year-old Jay from South Pasadena, California | Tommy and Toni Toscano (restaurant owners) in Orlando, Florida | Angela and Jay are the same age. After Tommy and Toni confiscate their belongings from Jay's luggage and Angela's luggage, Jay argues to Tommy for confiscating his belongings from his luggage, and he was disrespecting Tommy. Toni realized that Angela brought her cigarettes along with her tampon case filled her cigarettes inside, and Toni was disbelief in Angela's trust. Eventually, Tommy, a former New York City Police Department police officer, he found cannabis behind the picture frame on the bathroom wall and he decided to call the police. Jay admitted that he was hiding cannabis from Tommy. Tommy investigates Jay that he will take out the cannabis and cigarettes. Therefore, Jay lied and Tommy forced Jay to put the cannabis in the toilet. Also, Jay confronts Toni for cleaning up the toilet bowl. | 10 July 2010 |
| The Souza Family | 128 | 17-year-old Megan from Phoenix, Arizona and 16-year-old Paul from Encinitas, California | Mike and Cynthia Souza in Tracy, California | Cynthia found cigarettes in a tampon case, Megan admitted that she was lying about the cigarettes. Mike decided Megan to put cigarettes in a wheelbarrow, but she refused to put a cigarette in a wheelbarrow. Mike won't back down until Megan finally to put cigarettes away, she had to scoop out the horse poop. Cynthia helped Megan to clean up the toilet bowl, she refused to clean the toilet bowl. Also, Megan disrespected Cynthia for sweeping the floor with a broom and dustpan. Mike and Cynthia asked Megan to have consequences by scooping out the horse poop, but she refused to scoop out the horse poop. Mike and Cynthia had no choice, Megan was punished by sleeping on the porch all day and night. | 17 July 2010 |

=== Season 2 (2010) ===
| Episode title | Production code | Teenagers | Parents | Notes | Original airdate |
|---|---|---|---|---|---|
| The Allen Family | 201 | 17-year-old Kelsey from Hometown, Illinois and 15-year-old Zack from Wilmette, Illinois | Scott and June Allen (farmers) in Cartersville, Georgia | Both teens were from Chicago metropolitan area. When Kelsey needed to relax instead of doing her chores with Zack and the Allens' kids, Scott forced Kelsey to pick up all of the big rocks with her both hands and throw them in a wheelbarrow. Scott sees that Zack had his iPod Nano out, he confiscated Zack's iPod Nano away from him. | 15 October 2010 |
| The Malone Family | 202 | 15-year-old Taylor from Casselberry, Florida and 16-year-old Gina from Newnan, Georgia | Terry and Pamela Malone (a former police officer and a teacher) in Chardon, Ohio | Taylor and Gina tossed all of the logs out on the side, Terry identified that Taylor and Gina were lying for tossing logs out. Ultimately, Terry punished Taylor and Gina by doing 20 push-ups for lying. When Pamela found a cigarette, she punished Gina by doing a boot camp for smoking. Pamela sees the dust on the floor, Taylor was punished by doing 10 push-ups. Also, Taylor and Gina swear during the yard work, Pamela punished them by doing 20 push-ups for swearing. After the episode aired, Both teens returned to the Malone household to celebrate Thanksgiving in 2010. | 22 October 2010 |
| The Smith Family | 203 | 16-year-old Chloie from Huntington Beach, California and 16-year-old Kody from Monroe, Washington | Mark and Laura Smith in Findlay, Ohio | Mark and Laura confiscated their belongings from Chloie and Kody, Mark identified that Chloie and Kody were bringing cigarettes with them. Mark was forced Chloie and Kody to go to the pond along with Smith's children. When Kody is sleeping in bed, Mark has thrown Kody out of bed. When Kody left the barn with Mark, Chloie, Laura and the kids while cleaning up the farm, he decided to drink a glass of water. However, Kody was ultimately forced to take out the wooden posts after backtalking including Laura and her daughter Brandy Smith (one of the host family's children) and skipping the morning chores including scooping out of the horse poops. When Kody and Chloie were unwilling to clean up the barn, they runs away and hides in the cornfield by smoking cigarettes. After Kody and Chloie heading back to the farm, Mark and Laura found both teens from the gazebo and ended up digging out the dirt and into the wheelbarrow as consequences on the hot day. Kody feels tired and refused to continue. He decided to lay down in the grass, but Mark throws a manure at him. Both teens are the same age. | 29 October 2010 |
| The Pavoni Family | 204 | 17-year-old Ashley Chaddai from Lake City, Florida and 16-year-old James from Lakewood, California | Dino and Debbie Pavoni (restaurant owners) in Crestwood, Illinois | Ashley was declined to wash a car, Dino punished Ashley by carrying both weights with her arms. During the morning routine, Ashley tries to use makeup products, but Debbie intervenes and takes Ashley's makeup bags away after a long-minute wait. However, Ashley was punished again and carry both weights for 2 minutes. At Simply Slices, James refused to wear a pizza mascot costume, but Ashley decided to wear it and entertains the customers leaving James to sit on an outdoor patio on a hot sunny day. Ashley was refused to continue her yard work and unable to carry both weights. However, Ashley later apologize to Dino and Debbie for her behavior. One Pavoni family member died from a drug overdose. The Pavoni Family appeared in the reality TV show, The Profit for Simply Slices. Dino and Debbie were seen as being resistant to change. One of the Pavoni children, Derrick, would later compete in the ninth season of American Ninja Warrior. | 5 November 2010 |
| The Bledsoe Family | 205 | 16-year-old Sarah from Anaheim, California and 16-year-old Peyton from Gallatin, Tennessee | Jeff and Maria Bledsoe in Blair, Nebraska | This was the first U.S. episode where one of the host parents (Maria) with a disability. Both teens are the same age. Sarah wears an inappropriate outfit and her makeup but Maria cannot tolerate the dress code in the house. Maria forced Sarah to wear an appropriate outfit and her makeup. Sarah refused to wear her outfit, but Maria does not tolerate Sarah's attitude. Nevertheless, Maria punished Sarah by scooping out the dog poop. Sarah was sleeping on the job during the sweet 16th birthday party, Jeff punished Sarah by picking up the bricks, wood boards, and a pile of sticks and throws them into the weeds, but Sarah had enough. She refused to pick all of them up because of her attitude and her consequences by Jeff. Jeff does not tolerate Sarah's attitude. After the episode aired, in January 2014, Sarah was sentenced to 10 years at the Central California Women's Facility for stealing a car along with her friends. She was released in 2024. | 12 November 2010 |
| The Moyer Family | 206 | 16-year-old Sierrah from York, Pennsylvania and 17-year-old Gavin from Pittsburgh, Pennsylvania | Chuck and Tracie Moyer in Camby, Indiana | Both teens were from two different cities in Pennsylvania. Tracie has a "consequence book" she uses on her children. Gavin and Sierrah arrived at the Moyer's family home, Gavin revealed that he found his cigarette in his pocket and lends to Chuck. When Chuck asks Gavin to remove the nose-pierce from his nose, he is forced to remove the nose-pierce by himself. Sierrah said, "Oh, my God" to Tracie, she punished Sierrah by doing push-ups for using vain language. Gavin give up and refused to change his life, he wanted to go home instead. Tracie and her son advise Gavin for taking care to do his chore around the house, Gavin decided to challenge the Moyer's house rules. On day 3, Sierrah took a while getting ready, and she did her chores effortlessly. Out of Tracie's "consequence book", she had to pick up one dot at a time out of 41 dots hurrying and doing it carefully and meticulously. During the punishment, she tried to evade it by faking an ER situation, but Chuck and Tracie saw that it was straight manipulation. | 19 November 2010 |
| The Tilley Family | 207 | 17-year-old Christine from Quincy, Massachusetts and 17-year-old Jesse Hildenbrand from Pittsburgh, Pennsylvania | Eddie and Susan Tilley in North Charleston, South Carolina | When Eddie and Susan confiscated their belongings from Jesse's luggage and Christine's luggage, Eddie found cigarettes and a pornography DVD from Jesse's luggage. Christine had a hard time doing chores, Eddie cannot tolerate Christine's bad attitude. Both teens are the same age. | 26 November 2010 |
| The Hughes Family | 208 | 16-year-old Jacob Laxson from Glendale, Arizona and 17-year-old Tyler from Anaheim, California | Pat and Holly Hughes in Christmas, Florida | Jacob got busted for bringing cigarettes from his luggage by Pat and Holly, so Pat punished Jacob by carrying a slosh-pipe to walk around the field. During chores, Jacob and Tyler complained about the garden work, Natalie (one of the host family's children) was eavesdropping, and disrespecting by Tyler and Jacob. Natalie told Holly about Jacob and Tyler's attitude and swearing, she apprehended what they were doing badly. Jacob backtalks Holly, she counts to two and punished Jacob by carrying a slosh-pipe to walk around the field to do two laps for swearing and his negative attitude. Once again, Jacob and Tyler still complaining about the garden work, carrying a slosh-pipe to walk around the field, and disrespecting Holly. Tyler backtalks Holly while Pat just heard Jacob and Tyler's behavior. Pat cannot tolerate Jacob's behavior, he demands Jacob apologize to Holly for what he did. Ultimately, Tyler backtalks and disrespects Pat, he counts to five and punished Tyler by carrying a slosh-pipe to walk around the field to do five laps for swearing and her negative attitude. Pat had enough of Tyler's behavior and asked Tyler to sit on the porch. Pat will not tolerate Jacob's behavior, but Jacob still disrespects Pat again. Pat stern Jacob to sit on a baseball field until he's learned to control his attitude. Finally, Tyler and Jacob have apologized to Pat and Holly afterward. Also, Jacob did swears while working in the farm, and Pat punished Jacob by carrying a slosh-pipe for swearing. Deleted scene from the episode: When Tyler and Jacob start digging out the cow manure, Tyler insults Pat and Holly by saying, "Slave worker". Pat and Holly do not appreciate Tyler's attitude. Offended, Pat is tired and he does not tolerate Tyler's backtalk and her attitude, Tyler is punished by carrying a slosh-pipe for two laps because of her offensive attitude. Since this episode aired, Pat and Holly divorced and later remarried. Sadly, Pat Hughes passed away in 2026. | 3 December 2010 |
| The Illig Family | 209 | 17-year-old Sebastian from Chatsworth, California and 16-year-old Bekki from Castaic, California | Ken and Mary-Jo Illig in White Bluff, Tennessee | Mary Jo found cigarettes in the room, Bekki admitted that she was bringing cigarettes with her. Ken was upset with Bekki because of her trust issues and dishonesty. Ken punished Bekki by cutting tree stumps filled with red spray paint marked for bringing cigarettes. When Ken told Sebastian to pull his pants up, he refused and ignored the rules. Ken punished Sebastian by making him cutting a tree stump filled with red spray paint marked for not pulling his pants up. Both teens were from Greater Los Angeles area. | 10 December 2010 |
| The Fisher Family | 210 | 17-year-old Amber from Lakewood, California and 16-year-old Steph from Encinitas, California | Rick and Rose-Mary Fisher in Nashville, Tennessee | Series finale. The second U.S. episode with two girls. Both teens were from two different cities in Southern California. When Amber and Steph arrived at the Fisher's family home, Amber and Steph will follow the "yes sir" rule. Amber, Steph, and the Fisher's children were cleaning up by raking the leaves out of the yard, they broke the "yes sir" rule to Rick. The next day, Rose-Mary and Fisher's children decided to clean chores around the house while Amber is lazy and avoid doing her own chores, but Rose-Mary wants Amber to do some chores. Amber backtalks and disrespects Rose-Mary for doing her chores. Rose-Mary added numerous chores for Amber, but she cursed to Rose-Mary in front of the Fisher's children. Rose-Mary punished Amber by walking around the driveway until she needs to learn her lesson for profanity and her bad attitude. Rick takes Amber, Steph, and the Fisher's children to fix the flooded homes, Amber broke the "yes sir" rule for one time to Rick. Rick punished Amber by running around the traffic cones in the street. Amber had a serious attitude to Rick. Rick does not tolerate Amber's behavior. Once again, Amber broke another "yes sir" rule to Rick, he punished Amber by running around the traffic cones in the street for 6 laps but she refused. Amber had enough because of the "yes sir" rule, and complaining about more punishments by Rick. Eventually, Amber runs around the traffic cones for 6 laps and gives up her negative attitude. | 17 December 2010 |

== Reception ==
Melissa Camacho of Common Sense Media said that the show focuses on promoting healthy boundaries and establishing expectations but "some of the take-aways are a little confusing" and "there are times when the well-intentioned host parents appear to be playing to the cameras". The San Antonio Express-News television reviewer Chris Quinn called the program "quite funny and almost addictive".

== Related shows ==
- Teen Trouble
- Beyond Scared Straight
- The Principal's Office
- Sleeping with the Family
- Evict My Kid
