= Peter Orner =

American writer

- Born: Chicago, Illinois, U.S.
- Education: University of Michigan; Northeastern University School of Law (JD); Iowa Writers' Workshop (MFA)
- Occupation: Writer
- Relatives: Eric Orner (brother)
- Writing career
- Period: 2001–present
- Genres: fiction, nonfiction
- Notable works: Esther Stories, The Second Coming of Mavala Shikongo, Love and Shame and Love
- Notable awards: National Book Critics Circle (finalist), California Book Awards (silver medal)
- Website: peterorner.com

Peter Orner is an American writer. He is the author of three novels, three short story collections and two books of essays. Orner holds the Professorship of English and Creative Writing at Dartmouth College and was formerly a professor of creative writing at San Francisco State University. He spent 2016 and 2017 on a Fulbright Grant in Namibia teaching at the University of Namibia.

== Early life and education ==
Orner was born in Chicago and grew up in Highland Park, Illinois. He graduated from the University of Michigan in 1990. He later earned a Juris Doctor degree from Northeastern University School of Law, and an MFA from the Iowa Writer's Workshop.

== Career ==
In 2001, Orner published his first book, Esther Stories,. It won a prize from the American Academy of Arts and Letters, the Goldberg Prize for Jewish Fiction, and was a finalist for the PEN/Hemingway Award, the Young Lions Fiction Award from the New York Public Library, and was named a Notable Book of the Year by The New York Times. Of Esther Stories, The New York Times wrote, "Orner doesn't just bring his characters to life, he gives them souls."

In 2006, Orner published his first novel, The Second Coming of Mavala Shikongo, which was set in Namibia, where Orner worked as an English teacher in the 1990s; it won the Bard Fiction Prize and was a finalist for the Los Angeles Times Book Prize. Orner was awarded a Guggenheim Fellowship in 2006, as well as the two-year Lannan Foundation Literary Fellowship for 2007–08.

Orner served as editor of two non-fiction books, Underground America (2008) and Hope Deferred: Narratives of Zimbabwean Lives (2010), both published by McSweeney's / Voice of Witness. His 2011 novel, Love and Shame and Love received positive reviews and was a New York Times Editor's Choice Book, and California Book Award winner.

In 2013, Little Brown released two books by Orner: a new edition of Esther Stories (with an introduction by Marilynne Robinson) and a new collection of stories, Last Car Over the Sagamore Bridge.

Orner's stories and essays have appeared in The Atlantic Monthly, The New York Times, the San Francisco Chronicle, The Paris Review, Granta, McSweeney's, The Believer, and The Southern Review. His work has been anthologized in The Best American Short Stories, The Best American Nonrequired Reading, and twice won a Pushcart Prize.

Orner is a Professor of English and Creative Writing at Dartmouth College. He has taught at San Francisco State University, Iowa Writers' Workshop, the Warren Wilson MFA Program, University of Montana, Washington University in St. Louis, Miami University, Bard College, and Charles University in Prague.

A film version of one of Orner's stories, The Raft, with a screenplay by Orner and director Rob Jones, and starring Edward Asner has played a number of film festivals.

In 2016, Orner released a collection of essays, Am I Alone Here?, which was named a finalist for the National Book Critics Circle Awards in their Criticism category. The book has garnered positive reviews in The New York Times, The New Yorker, and a number of other publications. In 2023 he released his second collection of essays, Still No Word from You: Notes in the Margin, which was a finalist for both the Vermont Book Award and the PEN/Diamonstein-Spielvogel Award for the Art of the Essay.

Orner's most recent collection of stories, Maggie Brown & Others, was released on July 2, 2019, and has received overwhelmingly positive reviews from the likes of the New York Times, The Washington Post and Chicago Tribune.

His third novel, The Gossip Columnist's Daughter, which explores the intersection between a decades-long family history and the true-life unsolved mystery of a Hollywood starlet, was released on August 12, 2025. It was named one of the 10 Best Books of 2025 by the Chicago Tribune and a Best Book of 2025 by The New Yorker.

== Personal ==
Orner's older brother, Eric Orner, is the author of the graphic novel Smahtguy: The Life and Times of Barney Frank and creator of the comic The Mostly Unfabulous Social Life of Ethan Green.

He also has two younger siblings, William and Rebecca Orner. Orner has a long-time association with Camp Nebagamon, an overnight camp at Lake Nebagamon in northern Wisconsin, where he has been a counselor, wilderness trip leader, and village director. He has also worked as human rights observer in Chiapas, Mexico; a cab driver in Iowa City; and a sewer department worker for the city of Highland Park.

== Honors ==
- Finalist, PEN/Hemingway Award (2002)
- Finalist, Young Lions Fiction Award (2002)
- Rome Prize in Literature, American Academy of Arts and Letters (2002–2003)
- Guggenheim Fellowship (2006)
- Lannan Literary Fellowship (2006)
- Finalist, John Sargent Sr. First Novel Prize (2006)
- Bard Fiction Prize (2007)
- Finalist, Los Angeles Times Book Prize Best Fiction (2007)
- First Novelist Award (2007)
- California Book Awards, Silver Medal for Fiction (2012)
- Finalist, National Book Critics Circle Award for Criticism (2016)
- Samuel Goldberg Award for Jewish Fiction
- New York Times Notable Book (for Esther Stories and Maggie Brown & Others)
- Edward Lewis Wallant Award (for Maggie Brown & Others, 2020)
- Shortlisted for PEN/Diamonstein-Spielvogel Award for the Art of the Essay (for Still no Word from You, 2023)

== Bibliography ==
=== Novels ===
- The Second Coming of Mavala Shikongo (2006)
- Love and Shame and Love (2010)
- The Gossip Columnist's Daughter (2025)

=== Short Fiction ===
- Esther Stories (2001)
- Last Car Over the Sagamore Bridge (2013)
- Maggie Brown & Others (2019)

=== Essays ===
- Am I Alone Here? Notes of Reading to Live and Living to Read (2016)
- Still No Word from You: Notes in the Margin (2023)

=== Nonfiction, editor ===
- Underground America: Narratives of Undocumented Lives (2008)
- Hope Deferred: Narratives of Zimbabwean Lives (2011)
- Lavil: Life, Love and Death in Port-au-Prince (2017)
