= Scared Straight! =

1978 film by Arnold Shapiro

- DVD Cover
- Directed by: Arnold Shapiro
- Written by: Arnold Shapiro
- Produced by: Arnold Shapiro
- Narrated by: Peter Falk
- Cinematography: William Moffitt
- Edited by: Bob Niemack
- Production company: Golden West Television
- Distributed by: Golden West Television
- Release date: November 2, 1978
- Running time: 52 minutes
- Country: United States
- Language: English

Scared Straight! is a 1978 American documentary directed by Arnold Shapiro. Narrated by actor Peter Falk – known for playing a police detective on the TV drama Columbo – the subject of the documentary is a group of juvenile delinquents and their three-hour session with actual convicts. Filmed at Rahway State Prison, a group of inmates known as the "lifers" berate, scream at, and terrify the young offenders in an attempt to "scare them straight", so that those teenagers will avoid prison life.

The documentary aired on television in the late 1970s, uncensored; it marked the first time that the words "fuck" and "shit" were broadcast on many networks. Some broadcasters (an example being CFQC, a CTV Network affiliate in Canada) added locally produced segments in which experts discussed both the content of the documentary and the rationale behind airing it uncensored.

The documentary received several awards, including the Academy Award for Best Documentary Feature. It found that most of the participants did not reoffend. However, studies that compared and evaluated the effects of various Scared Straight programs against a control group have concluded that they increase the likelihood of participants later committing crimes.

== Overview ==
Teenagers in this documentary and the 1980 sequel, Scared Straight! Another Story, ranged from 15- to 19-year-old repeat offenders of crimes ranging from petty theft, drug addiction, and public intoxication to gambling, counterfeiting, and racketeering. None of the "graduates" of the original documentary have since been convicted of a felony except for Angelo Speziale, who in 2010 was convicted and sentenced to 25 years in prison for the rape and murder of his neighbor in 1982 (four years after the film was made).

Most were from the tri-state (Connecticut, New Jersey and New York) area and agreed to accept the experiment in lieu of jail time and/or probation/public service. The producers asked for a range of youth that came from poor inner-city neighborhoods to the affluent suburbs of New York City.

The "Lifers" featured in the film were primarily convicted of murder, armed robbery, or both.

At film's end, the teenagers say that they have decided that they do not want to end up in jail. The film ends with a "roll call" of the teens, revealing that most were "scared straight", though a few were said to have reoffended.

== Awards ==
The film won the Academy Award for Best Documentary Feature in 1978. It also won Emmy Awards for Outstanding Individual Achievement–Informational Program and Outstanding Informational Program. Scared Straight! won the 1978 George Polk Awards for Film Documentary.

== Preservation ==
The Academy Film Archive preserved Scared Straight! in 2007.

== Follow-ups ==
The original Scared Straight! was followed by a dramatized film Scared Straight! Another Story (1980), Scared Straight! 10 Years Later (1987), and (on MTV and UPN) Scared Straight! 20 Years Later (1999).

On January 13, 2011, A&E introduced the new series Beyond Scared Straight, executive produced by Arnold Shapiro and Paul Coyne. According to the A&E website profile for the series: "Each one-hour episode focuses on a different inmate-run program in the U.S., and follows four or five at-risk teens before they attend the program, throughout their day inside the prison, immediately afterwards, and then follows up with them one month later to see the lasting impact of the experience on their lives. Beyond Scared Straight is about transforming the lives of young people through intervention and second chances." In addition, each episode ends with updates of the teen participants since the taping of the program, citing both successes and some failures in their post-prison behavior, and unfortunate news of passings or incarcerations that happen if teens end up down this path.

On February 1, 2011, the Juvenile Justice Information Exchange reported that one of the graduates of the original Scared Straight! program at Rahway, Angelo Speziale, later became a convicted felon. In 2010, Speziale was convicted of the 1982 rape and murder of Michele Mika, a teenage girl who lived next door to him, and is currently serving a sentence of 25 years to life in Rahway.

In Scared Straight: 20 Years Later, Speziale claimed that the Scared Straight! experience changed him, although he admitted in the film that he had failed to lead a straight life. "I broke the law three times after I visited Rahway. Twice right after, still at the age of 17 and 18, and then about five years ago, I did fifteen days in the county jail for disorderly conduct." He was later arrested for shoplifting in 2005 and a DNA sample linked him to the 1982 cold case rape/murder that led to his imprisonment. A New Jersey law enforcement source has confirmed that Speziale is the same person who appeared in both documentaries.

On August 18, 2011, A&E premiered the second season of Beyond Scared Straight, once again in the midst of controversy. Joe Vignati, director of Justice Programs at the Governor's Office for Children and Families in Georgia, writes at the Juvenile Justice Information Exchange: "After becoming the highest rated program in the history of the Disney-owned A&E network, a new season of this 'reality' show returns to titillate the curious and misinformed." Also, in light of the Speziale case, the Campaign for Youth Justice has petitioned A&E to cancel Beyond Scared Straight because they claim that the show promotes "the spread of a noxious program" and may be in violation of federal law and standards set forth by the Office of Juvenile Justice and Delinquency Prevention (OJJDP).

== Reception and legacy ==
As a result of the film, many states introduced "scared straight" programs in an attempt to rehabilitate young delinquents.

In April 1978, James Finckenauer, a professor of the Rutgers School of Criminal Justice, began a test of the Scared Straight program, using a control group, something that had not been done previously. His study concluded that children who attended Rahway were more likely to commit crimes than those who did not.

A meta-analysis of the results of a number of Scared Straight and similar programs found that they actively increased crime rates and lead to higher re-offense rates compared to control groups that did not receive the intervention. The cause of the increase in crime is not clear. The UK College of Policing agrees that there is "very strong quality" evidence that Scared Straight programs cause an increase in crime.

In 2011, two Justice Department officials wrote an op-ed piece in The Baltimore Sun describing scared straight programs as "ineffective" and "potentially harmful". The officials, OJJDP Acting Administrator Jeff Slowikowski and Laurie O. Robinson wrote that "when it comes to our children," policymakers and parents should "follow evidence, not anecdote".

In 2004, the Washington State Institute for Public Policy estimated that each dollar spent on Scared Straight programs incurred costs of $203.51.

=== Cultural references ===
Television series Hardcastle and McCormick had an end of first-season episode called "Scared Stiff" in which teenage boys were taken to a state prison to scare them out of further crimes.

In 1984, the syndicated animated series The Adventures of Fat Albert and the Cosby Kids used the Scared Straight! formula in the episode "Busted". There, after the main protagonists are arrested for being accessories to grand theft auto—they had accepted a ride from their new friend, Larry, who admits only after initiating a police pursuit that he had just stolen the car—the police sergeant and court agree to drop the charges against the Cosby Kids ... but only after giving them a tour of a maximum-security prison, where the kids are frightened by the inmates and their behavior. In the end, the Cosby Kids vow to stay out of trouble and promptly disassociate with Larry.

The 1992 Married... with Children sixth season, episode "Rites of Passage", has Al Bundy, on Bud's 18th birthday, lamenting how the Department of Juvenile Corrections bused some juvenile offenders over to his shoe store, making them spend over three hours watching him work at his dead-end job, to show them how important it is to stay in school-and out of trouble, "until even the most hardened punk was crying like a baby".

Between 2008 and 2012, Saturday Night Live satirized Scared Straight!-type programs in a series of eight sketches.

In the third-season episode of Arrested Development entitled "Notapusy," a former prison inmate mistakes a gay conversion therapy seminar entitled "Startled Straight" for a Scared Straight!-type program and lectures the group of men about the horrors of incarceration, especially the prevalence of homosexual prison sex.

"A Date with the Booty Warrior," a third-season episode of The Boondocks, features a group of children participating in a program called "Scared Stiff". However, the program is subverted when the children and prisoners collaborate to organize a prison strike.

Rap artist GZA utilised samples of Peter Falk's narration for the song "Path of Destruction" from the album Pro Tools.

Comedian Tom Segura referenced the Scared Straight episode of 1999 that he claims "aired once" in his Netflix comedy special Mostly Stories.

In the Beavis and Butt-Head episode "Scared Straight", Beavis and Butt-Head are sent to prison for a day as part of a Scared Straight program. They end up befriending some inmates who share their passion for heavy metal music, and decide to sneak back in to stay longer.

In the Drake & Josh episode "Steered Straight", Drake Parker and Josh Nichols are sent to jail as part of a program that's similar to Scared Straight. However, on the way to the jail, the police car they were riding in is hijacked by an actual criminal, who mistakes the brothers for a criminal duo.
