= Joel Brooks =

American actor

- Born: December 17, 1949 (age 76); New York City, New York, US
- Occupation: Actor
- Years active: 1976–present

Joel Brooks is an American actor, known for his roles in Stir Crazy, My Sister Sam, Six Feet Under, The Mostly Unfabulous Social Life of Ethan Green and Phil of the Future. Brooks also had a recurring role as a psychologist in Ally McBeal.

== Career ==
Brooks was born in New York City, New York. Brooks had a successful career as a character actor in the 1970s and 1980s. In 1976, he won $10,000 on Pyramid; his celebrity partner was Lucie Arnaz. Twelve years later, in 1988, Arnaz and Brooks were both featured as the week's celebrities.

Brooks appeared in an episode of M*A*S*H as a wounded Italian soldier who fell in love with Margaret and refused to be shipped back to his unit because of his undying love for her. He also appeared in two episodes of Three's Company as Dr. Prescott, a psychologist Jack sees to build his self-confidence. In 1980, he played Gene Wilder and Richard Pryor's lawyer in the movie Stir Crazy. Brooks was then featured in two episodes of The Facts of Life as Edna Garrett's son Raymond and reprised that role in the 2001 reunion film. In 1984, he appeared as a movie director in The Dukes Of Hazzard seventh-season episode "The Dukes in Hollywood" and also appeared in an episode in the second season of Night Court as a representative of a cat food and accessories company that wished to reclaim their ostensibly stolen feline mascot. He played gay Secret Service Agent Randy in the short run of Hail To The Chief.

In the 1990s, his career continued in such hit shows as Star Trek: Deep Space Nine, where he played Falow in the episode "Move Along Home". In 1998, Brooks played Emperor Larry, the cousin of Sabrina Spellman on the television series Sabrina, the Teenage Witch.

In the early 2000s, he appeared in seven episodes of HBO's hit series Six Feet Under as Robbie, Ruth Fisher's caustic gay co-worker who offers advice on how to accept her son David's homosexuality. In 2008 he appeared in an episode of The Big Bang Theory as a Jewish professor from whom Sheldon seeks advice in the episode "The Jerusalem Duality".

In 2014, he guest-starred on The Young and the Restless as the judge in the trial of Ian Ward v. Nikki Newman. In 2020, he appeared twice in the Full House revival series Fuller House on Netflix as an FBI Agent in the episode "Five Dates with Kimmy Gibbler" and Agent Cooper in the finale episode "Our Very Last Show, Again".

In 2023, Brooks began working on Good Trouble as Morty, a Jewish comedy writer who begins to come out as a gay man.

== Personal life ==
Brooks is currently involved in teaching an audition techniques class, Auditions LA, alongside Beth Maitland.

Brooks married his partner, CC Pearce, in 2019. They were featured on Property Brothers Under Pressure Season 1 Episode 6.

== Film ==
Year	Title	Role	Notes
2019	The Untold Story	Samuel	
2018	Mistrust	Steve Masterson	
2012	Titans of Newark	Levi Katz	(Short)
2009	Basement Jack	Officer Geoff Wytynek	(Video)
2005	The Mostly Unfabulous Social Life of Ethan Green	Hat Sister	
2005	Bound by Lies	Raymond Karp	(Video)
2002	Now You Know	Friend of Mr. Victim	
2002	The Gatekeeper	Vance Johnson	
2002	Duty Dating	Paul Bartley	
2002	Role of a Lifetime	Irv Katz	
2001	Odessa or Bust	The Director	(Short)
2001	Circuit	Married Hotel John (uncredited)	
1999	Swallows	Pietro	
1993	Blue Flame	Morgan	
1993	Indecent Proposal	Realtor	
1989	Skin Deep	Jake	
1984	Protocol	Ben	
1980	Stir Crazy	Len Garber	

== Television ==
Year	Title	Role	Notes
2023–2024	Good Trouble	Morty	Recurring
2017–2018	The Mick	Detective Hurley	2 episodes
2015–2017	Young & Hungry	Rabbi Ben Shapiro	3 episodes
2016–2017	K.C. Undercover	Dr. Levinstein	2 episodes
2016	Masters of Sex	Mr. Schiff	2 episodes
2013–2016	Venice: The Series		13 episodes
2015	Sister Judy and the Delinquents	Father Joseph	(TV Short)
2014–2015	The Young and the Restless	Judge Ramsey	5 episodes
2014	Entitled	Harry Harrison	TV movie
2014	NCIS	Ronnie Mustard	Episode: "Rock and a Hard Place"
2013	Major Crimes	Gary Bridges	Episode: "Year-End Blowout"
2011–2013	Shake It Up	Mr. Polk	4 episodes
2012	Bent	Gerald Neibar	Episode: "Tile Date"
2010–2011	The Mentalist	Dimitri's Lawyer / Lawyer	2 episodes
2011	Law & Order: LA	Manny	Episode: "Reseda"
2011	$#*! My Dad Says	Freddy	Episode: "Who's Your Daddy?"
2010	Days of Our Lives	Defense Attorney	2 episodes
2010	Rizzoli & Isles	Roger	Episode: "She Works Hard for the Money"
2009	Trauma	Kurt Davies	Episode: "Masquerade"
2009	Trust Me		Episode: "Norming"
2008	Raising the Bar	Murray	Episode: "Bagels and Locks"
2008	The Big Bang Theory	Professor Goldfarb	Episode: "The Jerusalem Duality"
2007	Cane	John Fielding	Episode: "All Bets Are Off"
2007	State of Mind	Dr. Nour	Episode: "O Rose, Thou Art Sick"
2006–2007	The War at Home	Dr. Joel Lieber	3 episodes
2006	Reba	Doctor	Episode: "Reba's Heart"
2005–2006	Phil of the Future	Mr. Messerschmidt / Joel Messerschmidt / Battina Messerschmidt	4 episodes
2005	CSI: NY	Felix Parker	Episode: "Zoo York"
2005	The Closer	Assemblyman Bridges	Episode: "Batter Up"
2004	Without a Trace	Fred Cohen	Episode: "Trials"
2004	Half & Half	Dr. Bruckner	2 episodes
2003	Run of the House	Bernard / Mr. Franklin	3 episodes
2003	Crossing Jordan	Bank Manager	Episode: "Pandora's Trunk: Part 1"
2003	Everybody Loves Raymond	Mr. Rodell	Episode: "The Shower"
2003	The Division	Patrick	Episode: "Rush to Judgment"
2002	Door to Door	Alan	TV movie
2001–2002	Six Feet Under	Robbie	7 episodes
1997–2001	The Wonderful World of Disney	Raymond Garrett / Ferguson / Principal Norris	3 episodes
2001	Dark Realm		Episode: "Organizer 2000"
1995–2001	Diagnosis Murder	Roger's Doctor / Harrison Powell	2 episodes
2001	The Lot	Rachel's Attorney	Episode: "Property of Sylver Screen"
2001	Spring Break Lawyer	Judge	TV movie
2001	Strong Medicine	Doctor Hogan	Episode: "Child Care"
1999	It's Like, You Know...	Clark	2 episodes
1999	Oh Baby	Baker	Episode: "The Colonel"
1999	The Parent 'Hood	Mr. Worthington	Episode: "To Kiss or Not to Kiss"
1999	Beverly Hills, 90210	Dr. Van Fertle	Episode: "I Wanna Reach Right Out and Grab Ya"
1999	Dharma & Greg	Arthur	Episode: "Dharma Drags Edward Out of Retirement"
1998	Ally McBeal	Dr. Hubbell	Episode: "Love Unlimited"
1998	Style & Substance	Jerry Lindemann	Episode: "Do Not Go Squealing Into That Good Night"
1998	Sabrina, the Teenage Witch	Emperor Larry	Episode: "And the Sabrina Goes to..."
1998	Babylon 5: The River of Souls	Jacob Mayhew	TV movie
1998	The Wayans Bros.	Archibald	Episode: "Recipe for Success"
1997	Brooklyn South	Aaron Geller	Episode: "Why Can't Even a Couple of Us Get Along?"
1996	The Man Who Captured Eichmann	Meir	TV movie
1996	Homeboys in Outer Space	Major Domo	Episode: "Trading Faces or All the King's Homeys"
1996	Murphy Brown	George	Episode: "A Comedy of Eros"
1996	Living Single	Del Stuart	Episode: "The Engagement: Part 2"
1996	Duckman		Episode: "A Room with a Bellevue" (voice)
1995	Murder, She Wrote	Ted Duffy	Episode: "Unwilling Witness"
1995	Lois & Clark: The New Adventures of Superman	Donald Rafferty	Episode: "Chip Off the Old Clark"
1995	Here Come the Munsters	Larry Walker	TV movie
1995	Too Something	Gallery Owner	Episode: "Donny's Exhibit"
1995	The Mommies	Bernard DuBois	Episode: "Four Mommies and a Funeral"
1994	Aaahh!!! Real Monsters	Barker / Elderly Monster (voice)	Episode: "Curse of the Krumm/Krumm Goes Hollywood"
1994	Dr. Quinn, Medicine Woman	Judd McCoy	Episode: "Money Trouble"
1994	Dream On	Dr. Zudikoff	Episode: "A Face Worse Than Death"
1993	Jack's Place	Santoro the Great	2 episodes
1993	Dudley	Harold Krowten	5 episodes
1993	Star Trek: Deep Space Nine	Falow	Episode: "Move Along Home"
1988–1992	L.A. Law	Don Butcher / Kiefer Mitchell	2 episodes
1992	Civil Wars	Ira Belkin	Episode: "Chute First, Ask Questions Later"
1992	Are You Lonesome Tonight		TV movie
1990–1991	Good Grief	Warren Pepper	13 episodes
1990	Close Encounters		TV movie
1990	We'll Take Manhattan	Rigaletti	TV movie
1990	His & Hers	Mr. Hofstetter	Episode: "Dueling Therapists"
1989	Dinner at Eight	Max Kane	TV movie
1989	Hunter	Chad Jorgenson	Episode: "Investment in Death"
1989	Duet	Robert	Episode: "Too Many Cooks"
1986–1988	My Sister Sam	J.D. Lucas	44 episodes
1988	Going to the Chapel		
1986	Stranded	Phil	TV movie
1986	Rowdies	Psychiatrist	TV movie
1986	Riptide	Jerome Sedgewick	Episode: "Smiles We Left Behind"
1986	The Twilight Zone	Jack Holland (segment "Cold Reading")	Episode: "Gramma/Personal Demons/Cold Reading"
1986	The Magical World of Disney	Lee	Episode: "Help Wanted: Kids"
1985	Shadow Chasers	Laddie Johnson	Episode: "Phantom of the Galleria"
1985	Hail to the Chief	Randy	Episode: "Pilot"
1984	The Dukes of Hazzard	The Director	Episode: "The Dukes in Hollywood"
1984	Night Court	Roger Blair	Episode: "Billie and the Cat"
1980–1984	Benson	Mr. Krank / Walter Harwell	2 episodes
1983–1984	The Facts of Life	Raymond Garrett	2 episodes
1983	Alice	Vinnie Jr.	Episode: "The Over-the-Hill Girls"
1983	We Got It Made	District Attorney	Episode: "Mickey the Shoplifter"
1983	Diff'rent Strokes	Stanley Pearlburg	Episode: "Mr. T and mr. t"
1983	After George	Cal Sloan	(TV Short)
1983	Teachers Only	Spud Le Boone	13 episodes
1982–1983	It Takes Two	Dr. Rogers	4 episodes
1983	The Powers of Matthew Star	Burnside	Episode: "The Racer's Edge"
1982	Private Benjamin	Lt. Billy Dean	8 episodes
1982	It's a Living	The Tout	Episode: "Horsing Around"
1982	Open All Night	Ross	Episode: "Sitting Ducks"
1982	Taxi	Nick Dwyer	Episode: "Tony's Lady"
1981	Eight Is Enough	Bennett	Episode: "Starting Over"
1981	Dallas	Larry	Episode: "The Mark of Cain"
1981	Soap	Morty Stevens	Episode #4.12
1980	The Mating Season	Paul Wagner	TV movie
1980	M*A*S*H	Corpsman Ignazio De Simone	Episode: "Cementing Relationships"
1980	Benson	Walter Harwell	Episode: "Bugging the Governor"
1980	When the Whistle Blows	Max	Episode: "Macho Man"
1979–1980	Three's Company	Dr. Prescott	2 episodes
1979	Ryan's Hope	Joe Novak's Driver	3 episodes
