= Arnold Shapiro =

American television producer and writer (born 1941)

- Born: Arnold Joel Shapiro; February 1, 1941 (age 85); Los Angeles, California, U.S.
- Occupations: Television producer, writer

Arnold Joel Shapiro (born February 1, 1941) is an American television producer and writer.

His best known work is the 1978 Oscar and Emmy-winning documentary, Scared Straight! His other productions include the CBS reality series, Rescue 911, hosted by William Shatner (1989–1996) and the CBS reality series, Big Brother (2001–2006); the ABC documentary series, Brat Camp (2005); the documentary, Scared Silent: Exposing & Ending Child Abuse, hosted by Oprah Winfrey (1992) which aired as a simulcast on CBS, NBC, PBS, followed by ABC; Break The Silence: Kids Against Child Abuse, hosted by Jane Seymour; Kids Killing Kids, hosted by Malcolm-Jamal Warner, an Emmy-winning docu-drama which aired simultaneously and commercial-free on CBS and Fox; and Emmy-winning series of seven specials, The Teen Files, hosted by Leeza Gibbons. In 1987, Arnold Shapiro had produced an original how-to direct-to video project for Paramount Home Video, called How to Stop the One You Loved from Drinking and Using Drugs.

Among his 100+ awards are 16 Emmys, an Academy Award, the George Foster Peabody Award, the People's Choice Award, three humanities Prizes, the Television Academy's Governor's Award, and the Career Achievement Award from the International Documentary Association.

Shapiro's most recent documentary series have been Homeland Security USA for ABC; If You Really Knew Me for MTV; and Beyond Scared Straight for A&E (2011–2015). Shapiro's final production was the PBS documentary Iwo Jima: From Combat to Comrades which premiered on Veteran's Day, 2015. Arnold Shapiro Productions has produced programs for all the broadcast networks and 14 cable channels. Shapiro is a native of Los Angeles and a graduate of UCLA. After a 52-year career, Shapiro retired in 2016.
