= If You Really Knew Me =

American reality television series

- Country of origin: United States
- Original language: English
- No. of seasons: 1
- No. of episodes: 12

Production
- Executive producers: Paul Coyne; Angie Day; Arnold Shapiro
- Running time: 40–41 minutes
- Production companies: Arnold Shapiro Productions; MTV Production Development

Original release
- Network: MTV
- Release: July 20 – October 12, 2010

If You Really Knew Me is an American reality television series that aired on MTV and focuses on youth subculture and different cliques in high schools. Every episodes features students from different cliques participating in "Challenge Day", a program designed to break down stereotypes and unite students in schools.

== Episodes ==
No.	Title	Original release date
1	"Freedom High School"	July 20, 2010
Freedom High School in Oakley, California has a newly-diverse student body and is having problems adjusting. The major issue the school suffers from is that students have now separated themselves by race and are very cliquey. A jock, a loner, a gay band geek, an emo "A-quadder," and a leadership representatives reveal the truths within themselves.
2	"Anthony Wayne High School"	July 27, 2010
A mostly-affluent high school, Anthony Wayne High School in Whitehouse, Ohio, has a problem with cyber-bullying. Rumors passed during the day can blow up overnight through Facebook and text messaging. And the kids admit, the things they say online, they would never say to someone's face. A mean girl, a class clown, a jock, a cheerleader and a bully expose what they must really deal with despite what others may believe about them.
3	"Riverside High School"	August 3, 2010
At Riverside High School in Belle, West Virginia, camouflage is what the popular kids wear and even the homecoming queen owns a bow and arrow for deer hunting. However, when one girl from the "outcast" crowd reveals her painful past, the entire school sets out to change her life.
4	"Putnam City West High School"	August 10, 2010
Putnam City West High School in Oklahoma City, Oklahoma has been shaken up by a shocking recent death of a student, which motivates the students to look differently at their cliques and the rivalries between them, but most importantly, themselves. A jock, a brain, a class clown, a loner and a popular girl reveal what they really must go through every day.
5	"Colusa High School"	August 17, 2010
At Colusa High School in the small town of Colusa, California, everyone is to be labeled. However, when a self-proclaimed "nerd" comes forward about being teased daily, he realizes that even he can be a bully sometimes. Meanwhile, a loner who is fed up with being called a "slut" reveals a secret that describes how scared she really is.
6	"Paris High School"	August 31, 2010
At Paris High School in Paris, Texas, "jocks" and "tough guys" never cry. But when a star football player falls to his knees and sheds some tears, a fellow student reacts in a surprising way.
7	"Denver School of the Arts"	September 7, 2010
In Denver, Colorado at Denver School of the Arts, every student is competing for the spotlight. However, when a leading man is confronted by the "nerdy" stage tech at center stage, the performance in anything but an act.
8	"Neenah High School"	September 14, 2010
Neenah High School in Neenah, Wisconsin features a large student body, primarily dominated by "jocks," "emos," and "preps." But when an openly gay outcast decides to confront what's causing him to keep to himself, some students can't seem to agree with certain freedoms.
9	"Columbia High School"	September 21, 2010
Columbia High School in Columbia, South Carolina is a predominately African-American school where a shy white kid feels invisible until the student king of the cafeteria shows him how to work the crowd.
10	"Granite Falls High School/Cross Roads"	September 28, 2010
Granite Falls High School in Granite Falls, Washington is a school divided between the good students and the "alternative" kids. A preacher's daughter joins forces with an alternative school bad girl to unite the entire campus.
11	"Rancocas Valley Regional High School"	October 5, 2010
Rancocas Valley Regional High School in Mount Holly Township, New Jersey, where rumors ruin reputations, but an Emo student's shocking reality inspires a victimizing popular kid to look beyond the gossip.
12	"Royal Oak High School"	October 12, 2010
Royal Oak High School in Royal Oak, Michigan a popular student council leader bonds with a meek freshman choirgirl to seek a truce with a vicious school bully.

== International version ==
A dutch version, loosely based on the American one, named Over de Streep aired in The Netherlands for three seasons.
