= Eric Orner =

American cartoonist (born c. 1965)

- Born: c. 1965 Chicago
- Area: Cartoonist
- Notable works: Smahtguy: The Life and Times of Barney Frank, The Mostly Unfabulous Social Life of Ethan Green

Eric Orner (born c. 1965, Chicago) is an openly gay American cartoonist and animator, whose works often revolve around LGBT issues. He is best known for long-running syndicated comic strip The Mostly Unfabulous Social Life of Ethan Green and the 2022 graphic novel Smahtguy: The Life and Time of Barney Frank.

== Career ==
Cover of The Completely Unfabulous Social Life of Ethan Green

Orner began creating The Mostly Unfabulous Social Life of Ethan Green in 1989, when he was working as a political cartoonist for the Concord Monitor in New Hampshire. The strip debuted in 1990 in Bay Windows, a Boston LGBT newspaper. It was unusual at the time as "one of the first comics to portray gay men everywhere from the bedroom to the family dining room" The strip was carried by nearly 100 LGBT newspapers and alternative weeklies. Orner retired the strip in 2005, when it was adapted into a feature film of the same title, which received a limited national cinematic release.

In 2000, he moved to California, where he worked briefly as an animator for Disney's Tinker Bell film. From 2007 to 2009, Orner lived on a work assignment in Jerusalem, where he began work on a graphic novel to be named Avi & Jihad.

Orner has published comic strips and illustrations in The Washington Post, The Boston Globe, the San Francisco Chronicle, and The New Republic. His cartoon story "Weekends Abroad" was included in Houghton Mifflin's Best American Comics 2011. He has been nominated for the Lambda Literary Award and the Small Press Expo's Ignatz Award.

In 2022, Orner's debut graphic novel, Smahtguy: The Life and Time of Barney Frank, was published by Macmillan Publishers. Orner served as a longtime staff counsel and press secretary for Frank, the pioneering openly gay 16-term congressman from Massachusetts. Among the positive reviews, NPR called Smahtguy, "an enveloping visual experience crafted by a terrific artist with an amazing line." He was a 2024–2025 Cullman Center Fellow at the New York Public Library.

== Personal life ==
Orner is the older brother of novelist Peter Orner, as well as two younger siblings, William and Rebecca.

== Bibliography ==
- The Mostly Unfabulous Social Life of Ethan Green (1992)
- The Seven Deadly Sins of Love (1994)
- The Ethan Green Chronicles (1997)
- Ethan Exposed (1999)
- The Completely Unfabulous Social Life of Ethan Green (2015, Northwest Press)
- Smahtguy: The Life and Times of Barney Frank (2022, Metropolitan Books)

=== Articles Published in The Gay & Lesbian Review ===
- "A Glad Day." (2013)
- "Stonewall Unremembered: (An illustrated essay)." (2012)
