= Raising Flagg =

- Movie Poster
- Directed by: Neal Miller
- Written by: Nancy Miller; Neal Miller; Dorothy Velasco
- Starring: Alan Arkin; Lauren Holly; Glenne Headly
- Edited by: Paul Coyne; Ken Morrisey
- Production company: Rubicon Film Productions Ltd.
- Release date: November 10, 2006
- Running time: 103 minutes
- Country: United States
- Language: English
- Box office: $636 (United States)

Raising Flagg is a 2006 film directed by Neal Miller and co-written by Miller, Nancy Miller and Dorothy Velasco. It was shot entirely on location in Portland and St. Helens, Oregon.

== Plot ==
Flagg Purdy is a handyman who has been fighting a lifelong competition with Gus Falk, his neighbor. After losing a game of checkers and enduring other perceived slights, Flagg files a lawsuit against Falk, seeking to win control of a well and pumphouse on Falk's property through adverse possession. The case goes to trial and although heavily favored to win, Falk loses on a technicality. He responds by shunning Flagg and banning Flagg's wife Ada from selling produce in his general store. Other townspeople also side with Falk and boycott Flagg's services as a handyman.

Flagg responds by confining himself to his bed and announcing that he is terminally ill. This causes a reunion of Flagg's large family, including radio personality Ann Marie, real estate agent Rachel, preacher Eldon, worm farmer Travis, and teenage Jenny. Extended family members also make an appearance seeking to claim Flagg's possessions. Over the next several days, various issues and tensions between the family members, Flagg, and Falk are revealed. Ultimately, many of the tensions are resolved, Flagg is "cured," leaves his bed, and reconciles with Falk.

== Principal cast ==
- Alan Arkin as Flagg Purdy
- Lauren Holly as Rachel Purdy
- Glenne Headly as Anne Marie Purdy
- Barbara Dana as Ada Purdy
- Lyssa Browne as Tammy Purdy
- Austin Pendleton as Gus Falk
- Matthew Arkin as Eldon Purdy
- Robert Blanche as Matt Durwood
- Jordan Fry as Porter Purdy
