= The Principal's Office =

American reality television series (2008–2009)

- Genre: Reality TV
- Starring: Joey Sussman
- Country of origin: United States
- No. of seasons: 2
- No. of episodes: 21

Production
- Running time: 30 minutes
- Production company: Leftfield Pictures

Original release
- Network: truTV
- Release: August 21, 2008 – February 5, 2009

The Principal's Office is an American reality television series on TruTV that began airing on August 21, 2008, released through Leftfield Pictures. The series aired its final episode on February 5, 2009.

== Synopsis ==
It is set in various American high schools and features dramatic and humorous encounters between students and principals. Some events that lead to such encounters are students being late to class, bullying, truancy, food fights, smoking, swearing, harassment, cheating on exams, use of cell phones, dress code in school, disrespecting teachers and other students, fighting or skateboarding/scootering in hallways, vandalizing school property, theft, insubordination and disruptive conduct in class.

== Reception ==
The first season of The Principal's Office received "mixed or average" reviews from critics, according to the review aggregation website Metacritic. In a review of the first season, Variety described The Principal's Office as "mundane as to be kind of refreshing". The Boston Herald reviewed the show negatively, praising school administrators, but questioning the value of having their activities be filmed for entertainment.

== Other media appearances ==
- Some clips of The Principal's Office were aired on E!'s The Soup.

== Related shows ==
- The World's Strictest Parents
- Beyond Scared Straight
- Teen Trouble
- Sleeping with the Family
