= The World's Strictest Parents =

International reality television franchise

- Genre: Reality
- Country of origin: United Kingdom
- Original language: English
- No. of seasons: 4
- No. of episodes: 33

Production
- Running time: 60 minutes
- Production company: Warner Bros. Television Productions UK (formerly Twenty Twenty

Original release
- Network: BBC Three
- Release: 1 September 2008 – 15 December 2011

Related
- Supernanny; Brat Camp

The World's Strictest Parents (or World's Strictest Parents) is an international television franchise reality series developed by Twenty Twenty which is now a division of Warner Bros. Television Entertainment UK (the British subsidiary of Warner Brothers) with its original broadcast in the United Kingdom by BBC Three.

There are also many other international foreign versions (listed below) including an Australian version, a New Zealand version, and a German version titled Die strengsten Eltern der Welt, as well as other locales to have locally produced adaptations include Scandinavia, Turkey and Poland. The series won an International Emmy Award for Best Non-Scripted Entertainment.

Since 2013, the official YouTube channel has been uploading small snippet clips from many of the episodes, largely the UK, US and Australian broadcasts: however, these snippets, in some cases, were just whole episodes broken into smaller notable highlights of an episode. As of 2019, this has been extended to entire episodes, starting with the UK version and then moving to the Australian version. These episodes, in some cases, are not complete re-uploads of the broadcast: for example, the rundown of the teens at the beginning has been cut in some cases, depending on the teens who were broadcast in the episode. In addition, censorship has been done with profanity and surnames of certain people. The censorship has taken the form of either blurring the mouth during swearing and surname (if included) or profanity and names being bleeped in the audio tracks. Alongside these edits, the ending credits sequence is not included.

== United Kingdom ==
Unruly British teenagers are sent to live with strict families in an experiment to try to change their behaviour. Generally they spend 10 days, later 7 days, with their host parents trying to live by the latter's rules.

All series episodes were broadcast on a weekly basis.

=== Series 1 (2008) ===
Series 1, which was filmed in the summer of 2008, had six episodes and aired from 18 September 2008 to 23 October 2008 on BBC Three.

Episode	First Aired	Teenagers	Family	Notes	BBC Episode Guide
1	18 September 2008	Naomi Fisher (16, Brighton, East Sussex) and Ross Torry (16, Southend, Essex)	Mark and Lynn Garnett (A pharmaceutical company worker and part-time teacher) in Birmingham, Alabama, US	In the first episode, the teenagers, Ross and Naomi, are both the same age. At the charity work, Naomi and Ross get in trouble, Ross for shouting and using profanity and Naomi for asking a homeless man for a cigarette. At a bowling alley, Ross and Naomi sneak to a bar and ask a stranger for a cigarette. When Hunter Garnett catches them and when they get home, Mark Garnett loses his temper and punishes the teens by sending them straight to bed early. (Note: At the end of the episode, the wrong trailer is used by mistake, advertising the next episode that the host family is in Ghana which is actually (episode 3); the next one (episode 2) is in Jamaica). This episode was also aired as an Australian episode and narrated by Axle Whitehead.||BBC Episode Guide – S01E01	
2	25 September 2008	Charlotte Hart (16, Tiptree) and Sam Northaide (17, Brighton)	Dave and Sharon Rose (A government driver and householder) in Jamaica, West Indies	Sam gets sent to bed early after a confrontation with Sharon Rose about church, Charlotte leaves school early on the first day for writing an inappropriate essay and arguing with a teacher about writing the essay, and gets sent to the principal's office. The member of staff at the school whom Charlotte apologized to, Mrs. Wilks, died in 2017. This can be found on Denbeigh’s Facebook page. This episode was also aired as an Australian episode and narrated by Axle Whitehead.	BBC Episode Guide – S01E02
3	2 October 2008	Lizzie Pol (17, Birmingham) and Stephan Alvarez (17, Southend)	Richard and Vida Adega (a part-time pastor and businesswoman) in Ghana, West Africa	Lizzie gets into trouble in school for falling behind. Meanwhile, Stephan proves a productive member of the household. This episode was also aired as an Australian episode and narrated by Axle Whitehead.	BBC Episode Guide – S01E03
4	9 October 2008	Josh Breslin (17, Tamworth) and Charlotte Abrahams (16, Bristol)	Sanjeev and Meena Sharma (a high court lawyer and a householder) in Jaipur, India	During school, Josh and Charlotte sneak out to McDonald's, get caught by the principal, and receive a grey punishment card. This episode was also aired as an Australian episode and narrated by Axle Whitehead.	BBC Episode Guide – S01E04
5	16 October 2008	Lucy Dodds (17, Hornchurch) and Grant Stevens (16, South London)	Hannes and Alma Moolman (a farmer and a householder) in Eastern Cape, South Africa	Lucy is expelled from school for not complying with the dress code and for smoking on school grounds with her uniform on in front of the people passing by. After realizing how disrespectful Grant is and how he has had no father around for the majority of his childhood, Hannes contacts Grant's mother, Karen. Hannes finds out that Grant is rude to everyone in his family and he has it too strong for too long. This episode was also aired as an Australian episode and narrated by Axle Whitehead.	BBC Episode Guide – S01E05
6	23 October 2008	—N/a	—N/a	Catch up with the 10 teenagers featured in the series, looking back over their experiences to see if strict parenting has changed their relationship with their own parents. This episode aired in Australia on 7 December 2013	BBC Episode Guide – S01E06

=== Series 2 (2009) ===
Series 2 premiered on BBC Three on 15 October 2009 and ran to 17 December.

Episode	First Aired	Teenagers	Family	Notes	BBC Episode Guide
1	15 October 2009	Bex Keene (17, Walton on Thames) and Chezdan Dundee (16, Bolton)	David and Wanda Kimbrough (a pastor and school administrator) in Atlanta, Georgia, US	The Kimbroughs are a Christian African American family. Bex and Chezden get a scolding from Wanda after ditching Sunday School. Bex also gets in trouble at school for walking out of class, talking back to the principal, and using Facebook. Chezden spends a couple hours out of the house for having an angry outburst over David being considered his father. The song that's featured in this episode is "Rehab" by Amy Winehouse. This episode was also aired as an Australian episode and narrated by Axle Whitehead.	BBC Episode Guide – S02E01
2	22 October 2009	Peter Wrigley (16, Dorset) and Jocelyn Harris (17, East Sussex)	M. S. "Unni" and Madhu Unnikrishnan (a factory CEO and a householder) in Pune, India	During the show, Peter gets reprimanded by Unni for getting tattooed from an unlicensed artist, thus putting him at risk of contracting HIV, as the unlicensed tattoo studio apparently reuses needles. The production staff intervene, fearing for his safety. Peter is very unhappy after being forced to leave the parlour with a half-finished tattoo which was, ironically, to say "Wisdom" in Hindi.	BBC Episode Guide – S02E02
3	29 October 2009	Hannah Moorehead (17, Worthing) and Leigh Sturge (17, King's Lynn)	Michael and Marianyana (career army and a nurse) Selelo in Botswana, Africa	The family lives in a village. Leigh and Hannah both lie about smoking and drinking. Leigh disagrees with the locals about their ideas surrounding disciplining their children. Both teens attend school, where Hannah is much more reluctant than Leigh. At the end of school year ceremony, Leigh performs in the school's dance performance, while Hannah gives a speech. This episode was also aired as an Australian episode and narrated by Axle Whitehead.	BBC Episode Guide – S02E03
4	5 November 2009	Hannah Thorpe (17, Liverpool) and James Gowing (17, Leicester)	Spencer and Nicholeen P. Peck (a plumber and home-school teacher) in Tooele, Utah, US	The Peck family are devoted Mormons. This is the first episode that features a teen who is a young parent (Hannah). This was the most viewed episode on this show. This episode was also aired as an Australian episode and narrated by Axle Whitehead.	BBC Episode Guide – S02E04
5	12 November 2009	Gemma Lyons (16, Farnborough) and Jack Travers (17, King's Somborne)	David and Tzippi Schechet (an attorney and a writer) in Ayalon Valley, Israel	Gemma and Jack are introduced to the Schechet (pronounced "Shekay") family, an Orthodox Jewish family from Los Angeles, who relocated to Israel to live a more religious life. Gemma is an angry girl, who uses her looks and temper to get her way. Jack is a goth, and is bisexual, and is ridiculed by his family. The teens at first throw tantrums and disregard rules, but are humbled by their enjoyment of the work, and a meeting with two elderly Holocaust survivors. However, Gemma becomes jealous when attention is turned to Jack, 'reverts to her couldn't-care-less attitude', and is caught sunbathing in a bikini on the front lawn of the Schechet's home by Tzippi, disobeying the community dress code, after which she is asked to leave. After she spends a night in a Tel Aviv hotel, the Schechets decide to give her another chance and invite her back to join them for lunch in Jerusalem, after which they visit the Western Wall, which interests Gemma. This episode was also aired as an Australian episode and narrated by Axle Whitehead.	BBC Episode Guide – S02E05
6	19 November 2009	Debbie McQueen (17, Carlisle) and Daniel Drinkwater (17, Leeds)	Abdulsalam and Iman Hajjar (police officer and nurse) in Beirut, Lebanon	For a week they must live under the strict rules of the Hajjars, a liberal Sunni Islamic family.	BBC Episode Guide – S02E06
7	3 December 2009	Calvin Kirlew (16, Nottingham) and Rosie Harley (16, Brighton)	Earl and Rosie Perez (lumberyard manager and school administrator) in Belize, Central America	Earl and Rosie apparently whip their children when badly behaved.	BBC Episode Guide – S02E07
8	10 December 2009	Kaya Elliot (16, Manchester) and Jay Birch (17, Sturry)	Stacey and Shannon White (police officers) in Kiefer, Oklahoma, US	Kaya (a Beauty Queen) was picked by the police for running away from the Whites. After being rushed to hospital, it was revealed that she faked an illness, then refuses to stay after her scheme is uncovered. Meanwhile, Jay struggles with motivational issues ever since the death of his four-year-old niece, Molly, which are gradually resolved over the week with Stacey's help. This episode was also aired as an Australian episode and narrated by Axle Whitehead. Kaya becomes the first teen to fail the "program" and go home before the week was over. Her parents were left questioning how her life will end up if she continues this path. Jay eventually continued to stay until the week was over.	BBC Episode Guide – S02E08
9	17 December 2009	—N/a	—N/a	The programme catches up with ten teenagers featured in the series. The episodes that were represented were Atlanta, India, Botswana, Utah, and Lebanon. The teens recall their experiences and promises, answering whether or not the programme changed their life.	BBC Episode Guide – S02E09

=== Series 3 (2010) ===
Series three premiered on BBC Three on 11 October 2010, the show returned for an 11-episode run. While not formally announced, it appears the teens now spend a week with their adopted families rather than the 10 days in the two previous series. Each episode aired at 9:00 pm on BBC Three and was repeated at various times over the following week. It was also moved to a Monday.

Episode	First Aired	Teenagers	Family	Notes	BBC Episode Guide
1	11 October 2010	Wesley McGillian (19, Manchester) and Tamsin Carruthers-Cole (16, Brighton)	Joe Leveille and Scott Loper in Cape May, New Jersey, US	The first time one of the training parents (Scott), has gone to the home of one of the British teens, as well as the first time that the parents have been same-sex, the second time one of the teens was a teen parent (Wesley), and the first time one of the teenagers stayed longer than planned (Tamsin). BBC Episode Guide – S03E01	
2	18 October 2010	Nicole Benham (17, Plymouth) and Nathan Ballance (16, Kingston upon Hull)	Kenrick and Andrea Harris (an IT Consultant and primary school teacher) in Barbados, Caribbean	Nathan spends two nights out of the Harris home: the first night in a motel for not handing over his cigarettes, and the second night for not apologizing for leaving school. Both teens ran off on the school grounds and had Kenrick driving all over Barbados looking for them. In this episode, during a verbal confrontation between Andrea and Nicole, Andrea loses her temper and shouts at Nicole, who runs out into the street but returns after a couple of hours. In the scene when the teens arrive at the Harris household, Andrea interrogates Nathan for his smoking habits which he tries to justify, causing her to angrily respond with "You are not in the UK, you are in Barbados" while clapping her hands thrice. The quote became an internet meme among fans and non-fans of the show.	BBC Episode Guide – S03E02
3	25 October 2010	Nicki Stygall (17, Staines) and Jerri MacVeigh (18, Romford)	Brindley and Mandy De Zylva (a finance company owner and advertiser) in Colombo, Sri Lanka	For the first time ever on the show, the teenagers were both girls, instead of having one girl and one boy. The reasons for this are unknown. Both girls are highly aggressive, Jerri struggles to do volunteer work and is freaked out by the residents disabilities. Nicki screams and swears at Brindley when being woken up.	BBC Episode Guide – S03E03
4	1 November 2010	Eden Lelliott-Moore (16, Colchester) and Anastasia Jones (18, Hale, Greater Manchester)	Linzey and Jeanie Armstrong (professional modelers) in Astatula, Florida, US	The Armstrongs are an interracial family. Both one of the parents (Linzey) and one of the teens (Eden) are biracial. During the show, Eden and Anastasia get in trouble at the thrift shop for refusing to complete their tasks, for which Linzey had to come pick them up.	BBC Episode Guide – S03E04
5	8 November 2010	Rosie Hynd (16, Hassocks) and Nick Barrientos (18, Beckenham)	Ed and Marta Hill (lawyer and householder) in Puerto Rico	The teens get expelled from school for cutting math class, and are banned from getting their education at their school ever again. After that, Rosie Has a 12-Hour Standoff With Ed Hill. Both teens apologized to Ed and they were allowed back in the next day.	BBC Episode Guide – S03E05
6	15 November 2010	Scott Collinson (18, Southend) and Billie Spencer (17, Croydon)	Dickson and Faith Mugaza (manager of the city's environmental health department and householder) in Mombasa, Kenya	Billie spends one night on their grandmother's farm as The Mugazas' punishment for smoking as a minor and misbehaving in the community and arguing and embarrassing Faith over the school uniform policy. Scott is kicked out of school for refusing to shave his beard.	BBC Episode Guide – S03E06
7	22 November 2010	Sevda Hussein (17, Hackney) and Andrew Harwood (17, Chichester)	Randy and Rozanne Frazee (a pastor and householder) in San Antonio, Texas, US	Sevda leaves the house for a couple of hours after throwing a tantrum about not being allowed a cigarette, whereas Andrew didn't cause much of a fuss.	BBC Episode Guide – S03E07
8	29 November 2010	Forrest Talbot (17, Blackpool) and Daniel Eyre (16, Southend)	Jan and Lisbeth van Berkel (a middle manager and community worker) in Born, Netherlands	Both teens make a mess out of the oldest daughter's underwear drawer, Forrest bickers with Lisbeth for having a towel over her face during a conversation. After Daniel evades the production crew in Amsterdam to smoke cannabis, he spends a night in a hotel. Both teens repeatedly broke the "trust rule" of their hosts.	BBC Episode Guide – S03E08
9	6 December 2010	Nadia Traboulsi (17, Chelmsford) and Aron Shave (16, South London)	Nalini Nanjundayya (a businesswoman) in Bangalore, India	Mrs Nanjundayya is a single mother of three, following the death of her husband 15 years ago. She is assisted by uncles Pradeep and Mukesh, as well as her own mother, Lolita. Aron and Nadia were kicked out of school on their first day for fighting and smoking. The same host family would appear in the New Zealand version (see below).	BBC Episode Guide – S03E09
10	13 December 2010	Dina Darweish (16, Portsmouth) and Alex Miles (16, Bristol)	DeWayne and Vanessa Davis in Chicago, Illinois, US	Alex is kicked out of the Davis's house for a while after he smokes outside their house, but after a while, a guilt-ridden Alex apologizes to Dewayne and is allowed back in the house. This episode also aired in Australia on 1 March 2015.	BBC Episode Guide – S03E10
11	20 December 2010	—N/a	—N/a	The programme catches up with 10 British teenagers from the series six months after they lived with families all over the globe. It reveals the lessons they learned and the inside story of their journeys, including father-to-be Wesley McGillian and Rosie Hynd who met her match in Puerto Rico. Five of the episodes were represented – those being New Jersey, Barbados, Sri Lanka, Puerto Rico and Texas. All teens involved had made a marked change in their attitudes and behaviour.	BBC Episode Guide – S03E11

=== Series 4 (2011) ===
Series 4 premiered on 3 November 2011 and featured 12 teenagers. The series ran until 15 December.

Episode	First Aired	Teenagers	Family	Notes	BBC Episode Guide
1	3 November 2011	Remzi Tomlin (17, Romford) and Bryony Harris (16, Crawley)	Gonzalo and Guadalupe Bustamante (an advertiser and householder) in Buenos Aires, Argentina	For the first time in the programme's history, one of the teens (Bryony) had special needs (including ADHD). Additionally, Bryony had suffered long-term from anger management issues. On their first day of school, Bryony was kicked out for refusing to participate in a reading activity in English. She returned to the class with the headteacher (Marissa) and got a cigarette off of Remzi. This led to chastisement from Marissa, seriously aggravating Bryony, leading to her acting physically (and verbally) aggressive towards Marissa, in an attempt to leave. Remzi follows her out of the school; this culminates in their joint expulsion. After Bryony's outburst at school and at home, Guadalupe calls Bryony's father, where he reveals much of her history. The teens spent much time redecorating a kindergarten in a slum local to the gated community they were staying in.	BBC Episode Guide – S04E01
2	10 November 2011	Charlie Denny (17, Haywards Heath) and Hamzah Wali (17, Woking)	Anna-Marie de Vos and Suzanne Du Toit (a barrister and artist) in Western Cape, South Africa	The second time that the training parents have been of the same-sex.	BBC Episode Guide – S04E02
3	17 November 2011	Shola Bruce-Coker (17, North London) and Joiee Birch (18, Wye Valley)	Ashwani and Rashmi Virk (a real estate agent and householder) in Gurgaon, India	The teens are kicked out of school after an incident where security are called and Joiee refuses to let them search his bag, for fear of his bottle of gin being discovered. Shola is kicked out of the Virks' flat for a short while after swearing at Ashwani when he asks her to wear an Indian outfit for his deceased father's memorial service, but she refuses. After a few minutes, Rashmi steps out to speak to Shola. Shola later apologises to Rashmi and is allowed back in the flat.	BBC Episode Guide- S04E03
4	24 November 2011	Jade Bare (18, East London) and Connor Jones (17, Swindon)	Rob and Denise Smith Irwin in Seattle, Washington, US	This is the first time one of the host parents are disabled (Denise) and the third time that one of the teenagers is a parent (Connor).	BBC Episode Guide- S04E04
5	1 December 2011	Georgie Weare (17, Chelmsford) and Callum Watson (17, Manchester)	Benjamin and Shasha Li (a lawyer and housewife) in Charlotte, North Carolina, US	Both coming from single parent households, the teens come to live under the guidance of a wealthy Chinese-American family. During the show, Callum manages to improve and gets on easily although he has trouble quitting smoking, substance abuse, and drinking habits until the Li family help him realise the implications of his behaviour; during which he forms a friendship with the family's son, Alex Li. However, Georgie, Shasha, and Alex argue over Alex's opinion that Georgie did not do well at the charity work, then Georgie runs out of the house. Benjamin has to negotiate with Georgie in a two-hour standoff to come back in the house but returns and Shasha calls Georgie's mother. After the show, Georgie still refused to apologise to the Li family after her angry outburst during the show.	BBC Episode Guide- S04E05
6	8 December 2011	Hannah Button (17, High Wycombe) and Ritchie Reddey (17, Peterborough)	Ali and Canan Vural (both teachers) in Silifke, Turkey	Before Ritchie was sent to Turkey, he had a stretched earlobe, a phallic tattoo on his leg, and a bad relationship with his father, who left him when he was a child. Ritchie moved in with his dad at the age of 11, and has been through a lot of detention at school. Meanwhile, Mum is struggling with her 17-year-old wild girl Hannah.	BBC Episode Guide- S04E06
7	15 December 2011	—N/a	—N/a	The programme catches up with the British teenagers from the series months after they lived with their host families overseas. It reveals the lessons they learned and the inside story of their journeys.	BBC Episode Guide- S04E07

== Australia ==
The World's Strictest Parents
- Genre: Reality TV
- Starring: Axle Whitehead
- Country of origin: Australia
- No. of seasons: 3
- No. of episodes: 24

Production
- Running time: 1 hour

Original release
- Network: Seven Network
- Release: 22 July 2009 – 14 August 2012

The Seven Network also created their own series of The World's Strictest Parents, hosted by singer and actor Axle Whitehead. The first season debuted in Australia on 22 July 2009. However, a sneak peek was shown on 24 June 2009 and was the top watched show of the week, with 1.875 million people tuning in. Whitehead's song Way Home was featured in the advertisements. The show is classified PG.

A second season went to air on 14 July 2010, starting with two British episodes featuring Whitehead's narration.

Season 3 premiered on 10 August 2011, however the series was continually interrupted due to the airing of the third season of The X Factor Australia.

The remainder of season three was aired in the middle of 2012.

The show did not return for a fourth season in 2013, due to poor ratings. Instead, repeats of old episodes began airing on Sunday afternoons.

=== Season 1 (2009) ===
Episode	Teenagers	Family	Notes
1	Jess Hilder (16, Sydney) and Kyle Sandilands (16, Sunshine Coast, Queensland)	Jonathan and Cathleen Gibson in Noblesville, Indiana, US	Debut episode. Cathleen catches Jess walking out by herself, and leaving church to smoke. Kyle and Jess use the Gibson's punishment of swearing for cleaning toilets to control each other. Later Jess apologies to Kyle and he puts his headphones in, making Jess blow up at him and get in trouble. Kyle also attempts to flirt with local girls while doing volunteer work, irritating Jess.
2	Baylie Phillips (17, Adelaide) and Jono Denny (16, Ballina, New South Wales)	Thembile and Portia Bethe in Alexandria, South Africa	A parent saw Jono smoking during the school grounds, while Baylie received a four-hour detention for leaving the classroom early to go to the canteen and not completing her detention task. She gets in a fight with Portia the same night. After the show, Jono was arrested for heavy drinking and one of the family members, Thembile, was murdered in a politically motivated shooting in 2009. Portia had flown to Sydney to visit and catch up with Jono and Lyndall (Jono's mum).7Two. 13 July 2024
3	Emily Cunningham (16, Sydney) and Harry Clark (16, Perth)	John and Mary Coleman (a building company owner and special education teacher) in Whitechurch, Ireland	On the first day of school, Emily was forced to remove piercings from her face before going which she reluctantly agreed to do so. Harry misbehaved on his first day and had trouble fitting in, in which the parents confiscated his phone and runners. The next day Emily had mentioned nothing about the piercings and was up early to go horse riding with Evelyn. After Harry truanted school, Mary put him in his room for the entire night, then Mary caught Emily hiding alcohol under her mattress. However, as the week progressed, Emily's bond with Evelyn grew fast, one of the five Coleman daughters, and started to help out more with the Coleman's horses. Reaired on 7Two. 13 July 2024. Evelyn had flown to Sydney to visit and catch up with Emily and Leanne (Emily's mum). The same host family would appear in the Danish version (see below).
4	Naomi Fisher (16, Brighton) and Ross Torry (16, Southend)	Mark and Lynn Garnett (a pharmaceutical company worker and part-time teacher) in Birmingham, Alabama, US	1st British episode with narration from Axle Whitehead.
5	Zaine Edwards (17, Melbourne) and Memphis Fitzgerald (17, Hervey Bay, Queensland)	Meng and Ean Chua (a banker and parenting coach) in Singapore	Zaine and Memphis truanted school at Raffles Junior College and went joywalking around Orchard Road after being caught by Ada (one of the host family's children), then the teens were grounded. Ean caught Memphis entering her room and taking her house keys attempting to return to Orchard Road.7Two. 13 July 2024
6	Lucy Dodds (17, Hornchurch) and Grant Stevens (16, South London)	Hannes and Alma Moolman in Eastern Cape, South Africa	5th British episode with narration from Axle Whitehead.
7	Charlotte Hart (16, Tiptree) and Sam Northage (17, Brighton)	Dave and Sharon Rose (a government driver and homemaker) in Jamaica, West Indies	2nd British episode with narration from Axle Whitehead.
8	Stacey (16, Sydney) and Micah (17, Melbourne)	Brad and Nise Davies in Leiper's Fork, Tennessee, US	Stacey struggles to get up, and then refuses to garden with Nise. Later both teens sneak out at night to smoke, and are confronted by both Nise and Brad the following morning. They are then punished with extra workouts. Later Micah smokes with a local teen, and lies to Nise when asked about it. Nise, the strict mum, who was Miss Tennessee USA 1982 as Nise Levy, competed in Miss USA 1982 and finished as semi-finalist (Top 12).7Two. 13 July 2024
9	Lizzie Pol (17, Birmingham) and Stephan Alvarez (17 Southend)	Richard and Vida Adega (a part-time pastor and businesswoman) in Ghana, West Africa	3rd British episode with narration from Axle Whitehead.
10	Josh Breslin (17, Tamworth) and Charlotte Abrahams (16, Bristol)	Sanjeev and Meena Sharma in Jaipur, India	4th British episode with narration from Axle Whitehead.

=== Season 2 (2010) ===
Episode	Teenagers	Family	Notes
1	Bex Keene (17, Walton on Thames) and Chezden Dundee (16, Bolton)	David and Wanda Kimbrough (a preacher and school administrator) in Atlanta, Georgia, US	This episode was the 7th British episode aired as an Australian episode with narration from Axle Whitehead The Kimbroughs are a Christian African American family. Bex and Chezden get a scolding from Wanda after ditching Sunday School. Chezden spends a couple hours out of the house for having an angry outburst over David being considered his father. The song that's featured in this episode is "Rehab" by Amy Winehouse. BBC Episode Guide – S02E01
2	Chloe (16, Brisbane) and Christian (17, Melbourne)	Zack and Patty Wirth (ranchers) in Wolf Creek, Montana, US	Chloe refuses to do work on the first day, and the next morning both teens struggle to get up. Zack tips over Christian's mattress with him in it, making him swear and storm out of the bedroom. Chloe gets in a standoff with Patty over doing dishes, and she then tries to run away from the ranch, only to be chased by Patty. The following night both teens get drunk destroy the bedroom, and fight with both Zack and Patty throughout the following morning. Zack then separates both teens and threatens Chloe she will go back to Australia if she doesn't start behaving. The same host family would appear in the New Zealand version, with much stricter rules.(see below).7Two. 15 July 2024
3	Adriana (16, Perth) and Nathan (17, Melbourne)	Mark and Grace Ironside in Tyrone Station, Queensland, Australia	First episode with the family inside Australia. Grace caught Adriana and Nathan spending time in each other's room with the door closed, then Nathan missed out on his lunch after he refused to do his punishment, then he got in trouble for stealing the family car and Mark called the police but dropped the charges against Nathan afterwards.7Two. 15 July 2024
4	Thea Hewitt (16, Nowra) and Corie Wojciak (16, Adelaide)	Laval and Jennifer Simons (a special forces soldier and former army nurse) in Port Lavaca, Texas, US	Corie and Thea were picked up by the police for cutting school and was expelled from the institution. They were then forced into boot camp which broke them down in tears. The same host family would appear in the New Zealand version and were nowhere as strict with the New Zealand teenagers compared to how strict they were with the Australian teenagers (see below).7Two. 15 July 2024
5	Hannah Bentley (16, Bendigo, Victoria) and Dillan Olliver (16, Adelaide)	Andrew and Charnell De Kock (a medical supply business owner and teen counselor) in Johannesburg, South Africa	Dillan gets upset when he is told he has to have a haircut to attend school. Hannah and Dillan smoke multiple times at school and are later kicked out of school when caught smoking and ditching class. Andrew De Kock gave them an ultimatum on either going back to private school or going to a school in the slums of Johannesburg. Later, when Andrew and Charnell confront both teens about smoking at school, Hannah lies and storms out. When Dillan and Hannah are tasked with planting seeds, Hannah refuses and takes a walk through Diepsloot, scaring Andrew and Dillan.7Two. 15 July 2024
6	Aza (17, Sydney) and Troy Davenport (17, Brisbane)	Nathan and Cassandra McDonald (a pastor and music teacher) in Zanesville, Ohio, US	Aza manipulates Cassandra into trusting her throughout the week, she also takes a romantic interest in the McDonald's foster son Brian. She is later caught deceiving Cassandra and hiding cigarettes. Troy sneaks alcohol throughout the week and does a run from a soup kitchen. He is confronted by Cassandra for drinking and hiding it. Cassandra died on 16 November 2017. The same host family would appear in the New Zealand version (see below).7Two. 15 July 2024

=== Season 3 (2011–12) ===
Episode	Air date	Teenagers	Family	Notes
1	Wednesday 10 August 2011	Breianna Madgwick (17, Penrith, New South Wales) and Chris Lowden (16, Gold Coast, Queensland)	Nicholas and Mpume Myeza in Isipingo, South Africa	At the Isipingo community church, one of the cameramen are shown on the far-left when Brei shouted at Nicholas. On the first day of school, both teens were assigned to ground duty after Brei refused to remove her piercings and Chris refused to cut his hair. Mpume consficated Brei's make-up and earlier in the episode, grounded Brei because of her behaviour, then Brei truanted school which she was forced to come back to school by Mrs. Cogan before the police gets called which she reluctantly agreed to do so. In 2014, Chris was charged with attempted fraud and other offences on the Gold Coast. On 7Two. 16 July 2024
2	Wednesday 17 August 2011	Brooke Connor (16, Perth) and Mark Phillips (16, Caboolture, Queensland)	Peter and Annika Wallenskog (a part-time homeguard captain and economic analyst) in Vallentuna, Sweden	First episode where one of the teens (Mark) had only one kidney. Both teens smoked at school and Brooke was punished by losing her room. Annika confiscated Brooke's make-up and Brooke threatened Annika that she would take something of hers. Brooke was imprisoned a year later after the episode was broadcast because she was involved in a robbery with a friend and she served a seven-year prison sentence. On 7Two. 16 July 2024.
3	Wednesday 24 August 2011	Liam Stocking (17, Melbourne) and Rylee Carr (16, Gold Coast, Queensland)	Simon and Yvonne Godfrey in Albany, New Zealand	Both teens do a runner from church on their first night, and after being caught leaving the house later that night, are banished from the house and sleep outside. Rylee obtains cannabis from local youths. and after flushing the drugs down the toilet, Liam flips out and runs away, he was then kicked out of the house for going out twice and threatening Yvonne. He was allowed back in the next day. On 7Two. 16 July 2024
4	Wednesday 21 September 2011	Celeste Butler (16, Perth) and Kai(h) Andersen (16, Sydney, NSW)	Mark and Becky Lytle (an equine specialist and homemaker) in Marion, North Carolina, US	Both teens vandalised a cabin for a disabled member of the Lytle family, spray painted a sheep recovering from an illness, threw bouncy balls at Becky Lytle, and destroyed the letterbox. As a result, the police were called along with the private security firm. Emanuel, the grandfather, died in 2024. On 7Two. On 7Two. 16 July 2024.
5	Tuesday 17 July 2012	Euni Harris (18, Brisbane, Queensland) and Sam (16, Brisbane, Queensland)	Omar and Kumarie Bachew in Lavantille, Trinidad	The first episode where one of the problematic teens is adopted and of Asian descent, and the first to feature a Caribbean family of Indian heritage. Both from Brisbane, Euni and Sam are sent to live in Trinidad and Tobago under the roof of a family with roots from India. They bicker continuously with Omar and Kumarie throughout their first day, and Kumarie's mother leaves that night out of fear. At one point during their first night, the Bachews lock the teens in and Euni grabs the door threatening someone will get hurt if she is not let out. The next morning Omar threatens to call the police on both teens when they refuse to open the door and stop smoking. Kumarie eventually decides she can no longer deal with the teens and refuses to cook, leaving Omar to deal with them for the day. When Omar makes Sam count nails, Sam argues and cusses at Omar, and the police are called again. Later Omar argues with Sam over wearing makeup.
6	Tuesday 24 July 2012	Eva Bloom (16, Melbourne) and Gabriel Laklak (16, Adelaide)	Buck and LeaNan Burney in Keystone Heights, Florida, US	Gabriel was mocking Eva in front of the American teens during a beach party, making her irritated while she's giving food and drinks to everybody. After a violent altercation between Eva and Buck at night, Eva was given an ultimatum the next morning on either conform to their house rules or spend a week at a labor camp. Buck then brought Gab and Eva to a boot camp, where they experienced the same pain that they had given to their parents.
7	Tuesday 7 August 2012	Madeleine (16, Airport West, Victoria) and Lewis (17, Sydney)	Nishith and Sangeeta Saxena (a former army colonel and journalist) in Ghaziabad, India	Lewis is caught smoking on the first night and is caught by Sangeeta's son. Sangeeta searches both teens' bags they refuse to hand over their cigarettes until Nishith gives them an ultimatum. On the second night, Lewis asks Nishith about the decorations in his room while Madeleine steals back the cigarettes from the parent's bedroom. Sangeeta's sons turn Madeleine in the following morning, and when Sangeeta tells both teens they will be sent to work at a labor camp, Madeleine yells and curses at Sangeeta. At the same time, Lewis laughs, not realizing he is going with Madeleine.
8	Tuesday 14 August 2012	George Holt, 18 and Henry Holt, 16, Frankston, Victoria	Kenneth and Sylvia Woods (a restaurant owner and real estate agent) in Mount Vernon, New York, US	First episode where both teens were boys and were also brothers. Henry argues with Kenneth over how to do a proper signature on the house rules contract. Henry was later grounded after a late-night adventure in which he walked all the way from Mount Vernon to Times Square in the heart of New York City, with the show's camera crew following along for the entire journey. On On 7Two. 16 July 2024

=== Reception ===
The first episode attracted an audience of 1.54 million, and was the second most watched show of the night.

Episode No.	Airdate	Ratings (in millions)	Nightly Rank	Weekly Rank
1	22 July 2009	1.541	2nd	8th
2	29 July 2009	1.595	2nd	5th
3	5 August 2009	1.499	3rd	8th
4	12 August 2009	1.453	2nd	8th
5	19 August 2009	1.521	1st	6th
6	26 August 2009	1.302	5th	13th
7	2 September 2009	1.307	5th	15th
8	9 September 2009	1.395	3rd	6th
9	16 September 2009	1.407	2nd	TBA

== Turkey ==
The World's Strictest Parents
- Genre: Reality TV
- Country of origin: Turkey
- No. of seasons: 2
- No. of episodes: 20

Production
- Running time: 1 Hour

Original release
- Network: TRT 1
- Release: 1 October 2010 – 11 March 2011

=== Season 1 (2010) ===
Episode	Teenagers	Family	Air date	Notes
1	Jessie and Timmy	Jasons family in Philippines	1 October 2010	
2	Erika and Vern	Ruttern family in Kentucky	8 October 2010	Vern was sent home for drugs.
3	Waneta and Dante	Mellen family in Queensland	15 October 2010	
4	Arie and Timmy	Flom family in France	22 October 2010	Timmy spent one night in a police station.
5	Rosita and Efrain	Barrs family in Tokyo	29 October 2010	
6	Mary and Greg	Mathers family in California	5 November 2010	Greg and Mary had a fight and Greg was sent home for causing the fight.
7	Lorri and Quentin	Mast family in Italy	12 November 2010	
8	Ilda and Lyman	Gribbie family in Oregon	19 November 2010	
9	Hilaria and Donald	Texato family in Mexico	26 November 2010	
10	Rosella and Waylon	Jennison family in Canada	3 December 2010	Waylon was arrested for fighting and spent one night at the police station.

=== Season 2 (2011) ===
Episode	Teenagers	Family	Air date	Notes
1	Hilaria and Moises	Halliwell family in North Carolina	7 January 2011	
2	Shira and Clayton	Simser family in Russia	14 January 2011	Clayton was sent home after running away.
3	Toya and Erlene	Prechitt family in Maryland	21 January 2011	The first episode to feature two teenagers who are trans.
4	Carmela and Hugo	Eastham family in the United Kingdom	28 January 2011	First episode to be within the UK
5	Misti and Merle	Dorgan family in Texas	4 February 2011	
6	Jerri and Buck	Coulson family in New South Wales	11 February 2011	
7	Justina and Genardo	Outland family in New Zealand	18 February 2011	
8	Lila and Blaine	Leaman family in New York	25 February 2011	
9	Cortney and Letitia	Banas family in South Africa	4 March 2011	Second episode to feature two teenagers of the same gender
10	Hellen and Jeese	Tadeos family in Washington D.C.	11 March 2011	Series finale.

== New Zealand ==
The World's Strictest Parents
- Genre: Reality TV
- Country of origin: New Zealand
- No. of seasons: 1
- No. of episodes: 6

Production
- Running time: 1 Hour

Original release
- Network: TVNZ
- Release: 1 March – 5 April 2012

A New Zealand adaptation of The World's Strictest Parents aired in 2012 on TV One. Only one season was made.

=== Season 1 (2012) ===
Episode	Teenagers	Location	Notes
1	Arden Haar (16, Oratia) and Jasper Hamlet (16, Coatesville, New Zealand)	Nalini Nanjundayya (a businesswoman) in Bangalore, India	This is the Nanjundayya's second appearance on World's Strictest Parents. On the second day, Nalini disapproves of Arden's outfit. Later, Jasper and Nalini argue about smoking, and Jasper is given the option to give up the cigarettes or return home to New Zealand.
2	Adam Ellington (17, Albany, New Zealand) and Britney Gibson (18, Panmure, New Zealand)	Nathan and Cassandra McDonald (a pastor and music teacher) in Zanesville, Ohio, US	This is the second time the Mcdonalds family has appeared on World's Strictest Parents. Cassandra takes both teens to a juvenile youth center for incarcerated youth, where several comments made by Adam anger not only Cassandra but the center's director as well. Adam is also caught smoking, and refuses to be criticized without Nathan present. Cassandra's foster son Brian attempts to intervene, but only manages to provoke Adam. The next day, Cassandra takes Adam back to the youth center, where he is told he will stay for a number of months.
3	Riley (17, North Shore, New Zealand) and Emerald (19, Papakura)	Zack and Patty Wirth (ranchers) in Wolf Creek, Montana, US	This is the Wirth's second time appearing on World's Strictest Parents. Zack and Patty have made their rules much more strict after previously taking in Australian teens. Riley and Emerald sneak cigarettes throughout their time in Montana, but that didn't bother Zack. Fortunately, both of the teens became easygoing and respectful when they interacted with the horses, worked at the homeless shelter, and visited the church.
4	David (18, Dairy Flat, New Zealand) and Rene'e (17, Pakuranga)	Jacs and Debbie Lemmer in Pretoria, South Africa	On the first night, Rene'e begins to have a meltdown when criticized for cutting onions slowly. The next day, David is caught smoking by Debbie, and Jacs ends up searching David's bags. When David and Rene'e are tasked with completing homework, David cusses at the Lemmer's son Louwrens, and is caught smoking again by Debbie. Jacs and Debbie make Rene'e and David cook dinner, and tell them they will not eating that night or be going on a trip to an African farm, angering both the teens. Debbie is later shocked by photos Rene'e has uploaded to her social media accounts.
5	Rebecca (16, Pakuranga) and Michael (18, Epsom, New Zealand)	Debbie and Mike in Douglas Daly, Northern Territory, Australia	On the second day, Rebecca disappears while the family completes yard work and is caught smoking by Mike. Rebecca refuses to give up her cigarettes but later hands them over to Debbie
6	Jack (17, Invercargill) and Carlene (16, Taupō)	Laval and Jennifer Simons (a special forces soldier and former army nurse) in Port Lavaca, Texas, US	This is the second time the Simons family has appeared on World's Strictest Parents. During the rules meeting, Jack is adamant that he will be smoking while in Texas, and Laval tells him he can head home if he plans to smoke. On the second day, Laval confronts Carlene about hiding a second cell phone, and she refuses to give it up. Eventually, Laval decides to go through Carlene's luggage until he finds it, enraging her, causing an altercation between the two. Both the teens enjoyed their experience at an American high school until they were kicked out of school by the principal due to his concern about Carlene's behavior. Carlene ends up packing her luggage and debating on running away, and later when she refuses to work for Laval, so he calls in military drill sergeants. Carlene refuses to listen to the drill sergeants, and she ends up staying on the porch for the rest of the day. Jack enjoyed a military workout due to his passion of joining the Army. Meanwhile, Carlene begins to engage with the family towards the end of her time, but Laval and Jennifer do not believe she learned anything from her time in Texas.

=== Reception ===
Episode No.	Airdate	Viewers	Time-shifted Ratings	Time-shifted Rank
1	1 March 2012	332,740	6,400	16th
2	8 March 2012	277,000	N/A	N/A
3	15 March 2012	277,930	15,090	8th
4	22 March 2012	344,820	12,290	9th
5	29 March 2012	341,850	9,590	10th
6	5 April 2012	285,800	17,710	6th

== Denmark ==
In Denmark the show is called Verdens strengeste forældre and is broadcast by TV3.

=== Season 1 (2011) ===
Episode	Teenagers	Family	Notes
1	Morten and Anastasia	John and Mary Coleman (a building company owner and special education teacher) in Ireland	Both Morten and Anastasia manipulate John and Mary into giving them back their cigarettes, and later attempt to run out of school. Anastasia is also caught lying to Mary, and hiding a box of alcohol and cigarettes under her bed.
2	Frederik and Karen	Joel and Kim Pattison in Louisiana	Frederik is punished for saying "damn" at school, and later for receiving a poor grade on an assignment due to writing in Danish. Karen is also scrutinized for wearing a short outfit when going bowling.
3	Morten and Sasha	Ole-Jørgen and Ann Hammeken in Greenland	
4	Trine and Kodjo	Michael and Mette Grønbech in Denmark	
5	Michelle and Malou	Jørgen and Margit in Denmark	First time with female participants only
6	Henriette and Kim	Henrik and Annette Sørensen in Denmark	

=== Season 2 (2012) ===
Episode	Teenagers	Family	Notes
1	Jonas and Ditte	Datnow family in South Africa	
2	Dennis and Line	Dieckmann on the Danish island of Taasinge	
3	Robin and Natascha	Elgaard Thorsager family in Denmark	
4	Frederik and Amalie	Randy and Phebe Gray in Tennessee	
5	Michelle and Lennard	Morten and Ida Kristensen in Denmark	
6	Simone and Sarah	Katharine Birbalsingh in the United Kingdom	Second time with female participants only

== Germany ==
In Germany the show is called "Die strengsten Eltern der Welt". It is broadcast by Kabel Eins.

=== Season 1 (2009) ===
Episode	Teenagers	Family	Notes
1	Sarah and Thomas	Waldner Family in Canada	
2	Fabian and Julia	Uwe and Anke Nicolaus family in Namibia	
3	Kay and Nicole	Roland and Bernadette Brunner in Switzerland	
4	Michael and Jennifer	Dario and Carmen Urbanski in South Africa	
5	Anna and Pisei; Stephen and Agnes	Toby and Jody Dahl in Montana; Thomas and Jamila Friedrich in Morocco	
6	Caroline and Vivien	Isaac and Grace Akorli in Ghana	
7	Jaqueline and Mandy	Franz and Marie Krämer family in Patagonia	
8	Dustin and Jeffrey	Olger and Tania Tejada in Peru	
9	Anna and Michael	Dario and Carmen Urbanski in South Africa	
10	Recap of all families		
11	Lilli and Stanislav	Fedja and Ludmilla Fedorenko in Siberia	
12	Yvonne and Michel	Ianis and Ioanna Liebich in Greece	
13	Louis and Sarah	Roland and Edith Krämer in Germany	
14	Justin and Nadine	Reimhard and Michelle Stemmann in Teneriffa	

=== Season 2 (2010) ===
Episode	Teenagers	Family	Notes
1	Jenny and Dennis	Jotty Auala and Calista Tjazerua family in Namibia	
2	Michaela and Tino	Dumitru and Lucretia Carloanta in Romania	
3	Dominic and Alicia	Vasyl and Vasylina Maksymyuk in Ukraine	
4	Robin and Vivien	Uli and Jean Lengenberg in Seattle	
5	Vivien and Marcel	John Blackwell and Christina Spence in New Zealand	
6	Michele and Daria	Bishow and Indira Pokarel in Nepal	
7	Aylin and Markus	Ole Sairua, Nasali and Noretit in Kenya	
8	Soner and Laura	Philip and Mira Ross in Finland	
9	Shiva and Nico	Michael and Sabine Wesseln in Spain	
10	Anna and Laura	Dahl family in Montana	Second appearance

=== Season 3 (2011) ===
Episode	Teenagers	Family	Notes
1	Jessika and Basti	Bernard and Adele Dieme in Senegal	
2	Laura and Marlon	Shanker-Lal and Poonam Bishnoi in India	
3	Antonia and Max	Elias and Andrea Machaca in Peru	
4	Dominik and Kalica	Mehmet and Kezban Erdal in Turkey	
5	Michele and Daria	Bishow and Indira Pokarel in Nepal	
6	Samer and Dana	Laklak and Dhwarwar Marika in Australia	
7	Sascha and Janine	Mikhail and Marina Miguras in Siberia	
8	Dennis and Michelle	Haru and Shitaye Muluneh in Ethiopia	
9	Dennis and Janet	Chucka and Tserendolgor Bozjigon in Mongolia	
10	Maurice and Angelina	Aderno, Jandaia, Nitinaua and Nayara Pataxó in Brazil	
11	Danny and Jasmin	Julius and Kristin Lundberg in Iceland	
12	Marta and Fabian	Laurant and Maari Botrasoa in Madagascar	
13	Timmy and Anne	Emerson and Andrea Lopes in Cape Verde	

Unlike the original series, the teenagers don't know they are going to different parents' households and they think that it's just a holiday trip. The new family usually does not speak German and the teenagers likewise usually don't speak any other language than German so they can only talk through translators. Therefore, they do not have long conversation or are given advice as in the original series.

== Poland ==
In Poland, the reality was aired on TVN from 2012 to 2014 with the title "Surowi rodzice".

== Related shows ==
- Teen Trouble
- Supernanny
- Beyond Scared Straight
- The Principal's Office
- Maury (talk show) (1991–2022)
- Sally (talk show) (1983–2002)
- Sleeping with the Family
- Hermano Mayor (2009–2017)
- Brat Camp (2005–2007)
- SOS Adolescentes (2007–2008)
