= Paul Coyne =

American film producer

- Born: July 1, 1964 (age 62); Boston, Massachusetts, U.S.
- Education: Fitchburg State College
- Occupations: Film and television producer and editor
- Spouse: Elaine Hehir (1989–1994) her death,
- Website: http://www.coyneoperated.com/

Paul J. Coyne (born July 1, 1964) is an American film and television editor and producer.

== Early life ==
Coyne grew up in Milford, Massachusetts, and always thought he would someday become an artist. His earliest memory is of viewing a re-release of Jay North's Zebra in the Kitchen, at the Milford Cinemas. As a hobby, Coyne first picked up his mother's Bell & Howell camera when he was 10, and combined with his skills in creative writing, began making Super-8 films. His childhood friend, Mark Cicciu, worked as a theater usher, allowing Coyne to repeatedly watch movies free of charge, furthering his interest in films. It was not until high school, when viewing John Ford's "Drums Along the Mohawk," that Coyne realized he wanted to become a filmmaker. Coyne graduated from Milford High School in 1982, and given his penchant for drawing, he was voted "Most Artistic" by his graduating class. He returned to Milford High as the keynote speaker for the graduating class of 2000.

== College ==
Coyne attended Fitchburg State College in their film program. Among Coyne's accomplishments at Fitchburg State were co-writing and editing the first feature film attempted at the school, as well as directing a Casablanca-inspired fundraising film for the United Way of America. Coyne also made several appearances on WCVB-TV's Nightshift program, which profiled student filmmakers.

Coyne eventually met, and soon married, fellow college student Elaine Hehir on August 12, 1989. Already a super senior at Fitchburg State, Coyne and Elaine petitioned the school to allow the couple to seek a Hollywood internship, the first such attempt made by students at the college. By the time they left for Hollywood in 1989, Coyne was only three credits short of receiving his degree. He officially graduated in 2005 with sufficient credits. In consideration of his successful career and other achievements, Fitchburg State honored Coyne as the Distinguished Alumnus of 2005.

== Professional career ==
In Hollywood, Coyne began working as an assistant editor, before moving on to editor. One of the film's Coyne edited, Dolphins: Minds in the Water, received a Silver Medal from the Student Academy Awards in the documentary category, as well as a CINE Golden Eagle Award in the amateur pre-professional category. After that, Coyne received his first feature film offer for the low budget, Misfit Patrol.

Just as Coyne's career was beginning to take off, Elaine was diagnosed with a malignant spinal tumor. The two returned to Massachusetts where Elaine died in 1994, at the age of 26. Coyne eventually returned to Los Angeles in 1996, and continued to edit and produce documentaries, feature films and reality television shows.

Coyne has five art, writing, and film scholarships available annually at Milford High School, as well as "Women in Film" scholarships at Fitchburg State in honor of Elaine. Coyne is also involved in working with The Jimmy Fund, a Massachusetts charity that raises money for children with cancer. In 2004, Coyne and his fellow Survivor editors were nominated for an Emmy Award for Outstanding Picture Editing for Nonfiction Programming (Single or Multi-Camera) for the episode "Shark Attack".

In 2005, Paul was awarded the Distinguished Alumnus Award from his alma mater Fitchburg State College, in Massachusetts.

In recent years, Coyne has focused on producing, serving as Supervising Producer of Spike TV's Invasion Iowa and Shaq's Big Challenge and Homeland Security USA on ABC. He has served as Executive Producer of the critically acclaimed If You Really Knew Me on MTV, for which he received an American Cinema Editors 2011 Eddie Award for Best Edited Reality Show, and as Executive Producer of Beyond Scared Straight, which became the highest-rated original series premiere in A&E's history. Beyond Scared Straight was nominated for American Cinema Editors Eddie Awards for Best Edited Reality Series in 2012, 2013 and 2014. Beyond Scared Straight has been nominated and won numerous other awards as well, including Coyne's Emmy Award nomination for Best Editing in 2012.

== Filmography ==
=== Editor ===
- Dolphins: Minds in the Water (1991)
- Gas Food Lodging (1992) (second assistant editor)
- Scared Silent: Exposing and Ending Child Abuse (1992) TV documentary (assistant editor)
- Last Call (1993)
- Misfit Patrol (1998) Feature film
- This Week in History (1999) TV series
- Big Brother (2000-2007)
- The Living Century (2000)
- Flipped (2001) TV series
- The Amazing Race (2001)
- Ultimate Reality (2001) TV series
- The Bachelor (2002)
- Children's Miracle Network Telethon 2002
- Looking for Love: Bachelorettes in Alaska (2002) TV series
- Music Behind Bars (2002) TV series
- Dear Santa (2002) TV special
- The Family (2003)
- Average Joe: Hawaii (2004) (supervising editor)
- Survivor (2004)
- Joe Schmo 2 (2004)
- Situation: Comedy (2005)
- Invasion Iowa (2005)
- The Mostly Unfabulous Social Life of Ethan Green (2005)
- American Inventor (2006)
- The One: Making a Music Star (2006)
- Raising Flagg (2006) Feature film
- Shaq's Big Challenge (2007)
- Hell's Kitchen (2009)
- The Great American Road Trip (2009)
- If You Really Knew Me (2010)
- Beyond Scared Straight (2011-2015)
- American Grit (2016)
- This Is Life Live (2017)
- Flying High With Phil Keoghan (2017)
- Everything Must Change (2017)
- The Platinum Life (2017)
- The Story of Us with Morgan Freeman (2017)

=== Producer ===
- Rita Hayworth: Dancing Into the Dream (1990) (coordinating producer)
- Big Brother (2000)
- We the People (2002) (co-producer)
- Children's Miracle Network Telethon 2002 (executive producer)
- The Living Century (2000) (associate producer)
- Joe Schmo 2 (2004)
- Invasion Iowa (2005) (supervising producer)
- The Mostly Unfabulous Social Life of Ethan Green (2005) (co-producer)
- Shaq's Big Challenge (2007) (producer) (supervising producer)
- Homeland Security USA (2009) (supervising producer)
- If You Really Knew Me (2010) (executive producer)
- Beyond Scared Straight (2010) (executive producer)

=== Actor ===
- Hoggs' Heaven (1994) (Audience Thinker)
- The Mostly Unfabulous Social Life of Ethan Green (2005) (NancyBoy42)

=== Art Department ===
- The Paint Job (1992) Feature film (storyboard illustrator)
- Hoggs' Heaven (1994) (storyboard illustrator)

=== Writer ===
- Children's Miracle Network Telethon 2002
