= Beyond Scared Straight =

American reality television series (2011–2015)

- Title card
- Inspired by: Scared Straight!
- No. of seasons: 9
- No. of episodes: 83

Original release
- Network: A&E
- Release: January 13, 2011 – September 3, 2015

Related
- Scared Straight!

Beyond Scared Straight is an American reality television series that aired on A&E from January 13, 2011 to September 3, 2015 running for 9 seasons. The series follows troubled teenagers who spend a single day touring a jail or prison to learn from the inmates about the realities of being incarcerated. The series was inspired by the Academy Award-winning 1978 American documentary Scared Straight!. The series was executive produced by the original film's director Arnold Shapiro and by fellow executive producer Paul Coyne.

In June 2015, the network announced that the series would end after season 9, which concluded September 3, 2015.

== Summary ==
Based on the 1978 American documentary Scared Straight!, this series highlights juvenile crime prevention programs in prisons and jails throughout the United States. Each hour-long episode focuses on several at-risk teenagers. Throughout the series, these teens face intense confrontations from both law enforcement and inmates.

Each episode starts with individual interviews, where the teens discuss the reasons behind their habitual misconduct. Following this, they undergo the booking process, which includes removing jewelry, belts, hats, sunglasses, and other personal items. In certain episodes, the teens are required to wear prison jumpsuits.

They then experience life inside prison: visiting cell blocks, interacting with inmates, eating prison meals, and sometimes aggressive military-style boot camp discipline. They also hear firsthand stories from inmates about their journeys to incarceration. An emotional segment lets the teens communicate with their parents via the prison visitor telephone system.

The episode concludes with a one-month follow-up, providing viewers with updates on the teens' paths. Some have managed to turn their lives around, while others remain on a troubled course.

== Episodes ==
| Season | Episodes | Originally released | |
| Season | Episodes | First released | Last released |
|---|---|---|---|
| 1 | 7 | January 13, 2011 | March 3, 2011 |
| 2 | 12 | August 18, 2011 | January 19, 2012 |
| 3 | 17 | August 20, 2012 | February 7, 2013 |
| 4 | 9 | May 30, 2013 | August 1, 2013 |
| 5 | 8 | October 3, 2013 | November 21, 2013 |
| 6 | 8 | February 28, 2014 | April 24, 2014 |
| 7 | 6 | June 26, 2014 | July 31, 2014 |
| 8 | 5 | December 4, 2014 | December 18, 2014 |
| 9 | 11 | June 25, 2015 | September 3, 2015 |

=== Season 1 (2011) ===
| No. | Title | Original release date | Prod. code |
|---|---|---|---|
| 1 | "Chowchilla" | January 13, 2011 | 103 |
At the Valley State Prison, the female prisoners intimidate five girls who are behind bars. The teens are confronted by aggressive murderers and threatened with a weekend stay.
| 2 | "Jessup" | January 20, 2011 | 100 |
At the Maryland Correctional Institution, inmates including convicted murderers teach five teens the deadly, brutal, and unfair realities of prison life. During the tour, a teen snitches on a prisoner causing the prisoner to lunge at the teen forcing guards to subdue him.
| 3 | "Corcoran" | January 27, 2011 | 102 |
At the California prison which is home to Charles Manson, the teens learn life in the prison yard and the dangers of it.
| 4 | "Leiber" | February 3, 2011 | 10 |
Six teens visit the Leiber Correctional Facility in South Carolina.
| 5 | "San Quentin" | February 10, 2011 | 104 |
A group of boys goes inside one of the nation's most infamous prisons. They are taunted by cellblocks of inmates and even stand outside the death row area.
| 6 | "Hagerstown" | February 24, 2011 | 105 |
At a Maryland prison, the inmates give the teens a taste of reality in prison by showing them the “Lock-up Loaf,” a brick of baked mush served to unruly prisoners.
| 7 | "Jessup Women's Prison" | March 3, 2011 | 106 |
At the Maryland Correctional Institution, four shoplifting friends have the opportunity to learn the tough life of prison. The visit reaches its greatest emotional impact when one girl bravely reveals a dark secret.

=== Season 2 (2011–12) ===
| No. | Title | Original release date | Prod. code |
|---|---|---|---|
| 1 | "Mecklenburg County, NC" | August 18, 2011 | 205 |
A group of at-risk teens is taken to jail. A defiant teen goes head-to-head with terrifying inmates and one of the toughest female jail deputies Beyond Scared Straight has come across – Sgt. Garrett. When he finally refuses to follow an order, Sgt. Garrett makes it her mission to break him down.
| 2 | "Oakland County, MI" | August 25, 2011 | 201 |
The deputies and inmates who run "Turn-Around" program are tough. They are physical, vocal and in-your-face. They may have met their match in a drug-dealing teen who proves himself with his fists.
| 3 | "Portsmouth County, VA" | September 1, 2011 | 203 |
The at-risk teens aren't afraid to fight back when confronted with a loud cellblock One gets into a screaming match with a verbally abusive inmate while another teen, who answers teasing with violence, insults another inmate and is pulled screaming into his cell.
| 4 | "Oklahoma County, OK" | September 8, 2011 | 206 |
Angry, impressionable teens are being pulled into the gangster lifestyle. For two pairs of at-risk girls who an intervention program, jail seems to be no scarier than the streets. When one of them is pushed to there breaking point, she physically assaults a deputy.
| 5 | "San Bernardino County, CA - Boys" | September 15, 2011 | 204 |
For four teens that begin an intervention program, neither the deputies nor inmates seem to make an impact. A drug-dealer threatens a deputy and a thief spits on an inmate.
| 6 | "Richland County, SC" | December 8, 2011 | 202 |
Troublemakers stay overnight at jail as deputies and violent convicts make it a sleepless experience.
| 7 | "St. Clair County, IL" | December 15, 2011 | 208 |
After being mobbed by a cellblock of screaming inmates, at-risk teens, are shocked when the terror follows them outside the jail.
| 8 | "San Bernardino County, CA - Girls" | December 22, 2011 | 207 |
A teenaged female gang member defies inmates and deputies, leading to a physical confrontation in the chow hall.
| 9 | "Western Tidewater Regional Jail, VA" | December 29, 2011 | 211 |
Drug using siblings visit a notorious jail and see the deadly realities of behind bars. One of them is snatched up into a closet by an inmate and threatened, the other one learns that good looks get you nowhere inside.
| 10 | "Queen Anne's County, MD" | January 5, 2012 | 210 |
During a four-day intervention experience where at-risk teens witness both jail and their own funeral, a boyfriend and girlfriend turn on each other.
| 11 | "Oakland County, MI - Girls" | January 12, 2012 | 209 |
A teen trio of female troublemakers discovers their bond is not tight enough to survive even a day inside a women's lockup.
| 12 | "Hampton Roads Regional Jail, VA" | January 19, 2012 | 212 |
A teenage pyromaniac discovers that he wouldn't survive behind bars, even though his mother is one of the deputies at the jail.

=== Season 3 (2012–13) ===
| No. | Title | Original release date | Prod. code |
|---|---|---|---|
| 1 | "Boston, MA (Girls)" | August 20, 2012 | 302 |
In a city where your neighborhood defines your gang, four at-risk teen girls endure a day in a female jail and learn where their lives are headed. Though they walk into the jail together, the teens will turn on one of their own
| 2 | "Jacksonville, FL (Boys)" | August 27, 2012 | 305 |
Four at-risk teens attend a three-part "scared straight" tour. A large 15-year-old, is intimidated by no one. But when he witnesses his pint-sized little brother suffering the terrifying consequences of trying to imitate him, he breaks down. Also a white, self-proclaimed racist, endures the wrath of the black inmate population.
| 3 | "The Return of "Ice Mike" | October 4, 2012 | St. Clair County, IL |
Troubled teens that attend a diversion program take a lie detector test that reveals some shocking secrets. Inmates "Ice Mike" and "Hustle Man" return from last season to confront a BMX-riding stoner, a fearless gangster, a terrorizing bully, and a promiscuous under age girl who just doesn't say no to older boys and her paralyzed mom can't stop her.
| 4 | "Hudson County, NJ" | October 11, 2012 | 213 |
Near the Jersey Shore, four cocky at-risk teens try to charm their way through a harrowing day in a New Jersey jail; one of them reunites with their father; gunshots ring out sending everyone to the ground.
| 5 | "The Return of Tiny" | October 18, 2012 | Oklahoma County, OK |
Four at-risk teens are confronted by gang members and their own emotions while touring the county jail. Inmate Tiny from last season and a hardened female inmate who is an avowed member of the Aryan Brotherhood zeroes in on each teen, regardless of race, describing a vivid and terrifying portrait of what she's capable of doing to all of them.
| 6 | "San Bernardino, CA" | October 25, 2012 | 301 |
Parents are losing control of their teens.
| 7 | "Lake County, FL" | November 1, 2012 | 216 |
Troubled teens find little to do but act out and break the law. a beautiful manipulator, who uses her looks to get what she wants and an angry thug who gets into physical fights with school officials and family members discover that in jail it doesn't matter who you think you are on the outside.
| 8 | "Fulton County, GA" | November 8, 2012 | 215 |
Four at-risk teens are given a wide-eyed view of the justice system, from having to clean toilets in a cellblock to being interrogated by a judge
| 9 | "Hampton Roads, VA" | November 15, 2012 | 306 |
During a "scared straight" tour, a money-hungry teen drug dealer named R.J. refuses to be scared and lunges at a taunting inmate until officers subdue him
| 10 | "Richland County, SC" | December 20, 2012 | 311 |
A mother of 3 troubled teens from Dallas, Texas drives 1,000 miles to enter them in the overnight program.
| 11 | "Oneida County, NY" | December 27, 2012 | 309 |
One of a trio of teen hoodlums is made a brutal example in a restraint chair and officers cuff an explosive bully before he even enters the jail.
| 12 | "Oklahoma County, OK" | January 3, 2013 | 316 |
A spoiled drama queen thinks the tour is just a TV show populated with actors, but she is shocked by the reality of hardened criminals directing her every move.
| 13 | "Floyd County, GA" | January 10, 2013 | 313 |
An angry teen's cancer-stricken father hopes a trip to jail will change his son's destructive ways before it's too late.
| 14 | "Portsmouth County, VA" | January 17, 2013 | 307 |
An at-risk teen, with dreams of a rap career, gets a wake-up call when he sees where his love of drugs and gang activity will lead to during a visit.
| 15 | "Western Tidewater, VA" | January 24, 2013 | 310 |
A bad attitude may be one promiscuous teen girl's biggest weapon, but when she has to share a cell with her inmate cousin she finds out family ties do not bind behind bars.
| 16 | "Suffolk County, MA (Boys)" | January 31, 2013 | 303 |
Fresh from the hood, teens face rival gang members whose local loyalties persist behind bars, when they tour.
| 17 | "Follow-Up Special" | February 7, 2013 | 406 |
This follow up special goes back on the last few seasons to see if the teens turned their life around.

=== Season 4 (2013) ===
| No. | Title | Original release date | Prod. code |
|---|---|---|---|
| 1 | "Oneida, NY" | May 30, 2013 | 403 |
Four troubled girls learn that the trauma they put their mothers through at home is nothing compared to the terror of life behind bars.
| 2 | "Deputy Lyle Returns" | June 6, 2013 | Floyd County, GA |
Colorful Deputy Lyle returns to change the lives of four troubled teens, though he may have finally met his match in one teen who threatens to put Lyle in his place.
| 3 | "Big and Bad" | June 13, 2013 | Hampton Roads |
Deputies have never seen the level of defiance they get from a 14-year old street brawler.
| 4 | "Lake County, FL" | June 27, 2013 | 401 |
A 12-year old girl is reduced to frightened tears, and even the inmates are shocked when her older brother refuses to offer any comfort.
| 5 | "Oakland County, MI" | July 11, 2013 | 308 |
An explosive giant who attacks his adopted parents, may have finally met his match in the hardened inmates and officers.
| 6 | "St. Clair County, IL" | July 18, 2013 | 314 |
Ferocious killer and inmate Hustle Man is dragged from a teen talk when he attacks an at-risk kid who refuses to comb another inmate's chest hair.
| 7 | "Douglas County, GA" | July 25, 2013 | 402 |
Two sisters defy both inmates and deputies but once their mother has an emotional breakdown, their eyes are opened to the pain they have caused.
| 8 | "Girls Fight Back" | August 1, 2013 | Hampton Roads, VA |
Four teens think that the reputations they've built for themselves on the streets will protect them from an inmate onslaught behind bars. One teen is targeted by gang members and changing his ways may be the only thing to save his life.
| 9 | "Truth or Consequences" | August 1, 2013 | Richland County, SC |
During a physically exhausting all-night jail stay in jail Aaron, 12, a habitual liar, confounds deputies by excelling at every exercise--despite having a broken arm.

=== Season 5 (2013) ===
| No. | Title | Original release date | Prod. code |
|---|---|---|---|
| 1 | "Dance, Bieber, Dance" | October 3, 2013 | Albuquerque, NM |
A 17-year-old stoner tries to defend his girlfriend's honor against a cellblock full of snarling, tattooed inmates.
| 2 | "Snitches Get Stitches" | October 10, 2013 | Floyd County, GA |
For the first time, a violent teen featured on a previous "Beyond Scared Straight" episode is now a submissive inmate hoping to change the lives of a new group of teens.
| 3 | "Insane and Chaos" | October 17, 2013 | Oklahoma County, OK |
A fifteen-year-old fighter becomes enraged and tries to run from officers to escape the harsh realities of jail
| 4 | "Outside and Inside" | October 24, 2013 | Queen Anne's County, MD |
Troubled teens visit a jail, a funeral home and an emergency room, leading to a deadly encounter.
| 5 | "Fulton County, GA" | October 31, 2013 | Atlanta, GA |
A visit to the "alternative lifestyle" unit shows four at-risk teens that being different makes you an even bigger target in jail. One brother squeals on his younger sibling, leading one of them to be taken away in cuffs.
| 6 | "Charlotte County, FL" | November 7, 2013 | TBA |
A high-school football player wants to join the SWAT team after graduation, but drugs and fighting are leading him straight to "the longest yard."
| 7 | "St. Clair, IL" | November 14, 2013 | TBA |
A troubled teen disappears into a crush of angry inmates as deputies and his loyal, street-tough brother try to figure out where he has gone.
| 8 | "Dougherty County, GA" | November 21, 2013 | TBA |
An explosive fighter and thief, taunts Georgia deputies and inmates by wearing a homemade t-shirt that mocks efforts to scare him straight.

=== Season 6 (2014) ===
| No. | Title | Original release date | Prod. code |
|---|---|---|---|
| 1 | "Family Ties" | February 28, 2014 | Hampton Roads, VA |
In Virginia, chaos takes over and officers spring into action when aggressive sisters and their cousin are told they will be staying in jail overnight.
| 2 | "A Family's Loss" | March 7, 2014 | Douglas County, GA |
Following the jail tour, the streets sadly takes the life of a teen trying to head down a better path.
| 3 | "Roundtree Circle" | March 14, 2014 | Chester County, SC |
In an emotionally devastating encounter, a teen gang-banger has a heart-wrenching talk with his desperate and remorseful brother, who is incarcerated.
| 4 | "Precious Time" | March 27, 2014 | St. Clair County, IL |
A nineteen-year-old self-described hustler thinks everything is a joke, but when he angers the wrong inmate during the "Beyond Scared Straight" program, he suddenly finds himself at the center of a screaming mob.
| 5 | "Without My Daddy" | April 3, 2014 | Hampton Roads, VA |
A 14-year-old fighter whose father recently died, erupts in rage until the inmates and deputies make her realize the source of her anger.
| 6 | "Teen Father?" | April 10, 2014 | Oklahoma County, OK |
Two brothers and their sister are on a rampage of violence and crime until they are split apart.
| 7 | "Song for Sandals" | April 17, 2014 | Dougherty County, GA |
A twelve-year-old boy genius, who is convinced he can outsmart anyone, is tested in the fundamentals of jailhouse survival.
| 8 | "My Father the Inmate" | April 24, 2014 | Fulton County, GA |
A 17-year-old thief steals multiple cars and has no remorse about being "gone in 60 seconds". When he discovers his stepdad imprisoned his world comes crashing down.

=== Season 7 (2014) ===
| No. | Title | Original release date | Prod. code |
|---|---|---|---|
| 1 | "Bunk and Junk" | June 26, 2014 | St. Clair County, IL |
The loyalty of two inseparable sisters is tested when one must make the tough choice of either betraying her sister or staying in jail overnight.
| 2 | "Girls" | July 3, 2014 | Chester, SC |
Arrested for stealing, an eighteen-year-old girl is already behind bars when the tour begins but her criminal behavior is far worse than her crime.
| 3 | "Hold on Turbo" | July 10, 2014 | San Bernardino, CA |
a teenage boy runs with gang-members on the streets, but it's at home where he wields knives and becomes the most dangerous.
| 4 | "Jailhouse Rap" | July 17, 2014 | Hampton Roads, VA |
A defiant 15-year-old fighter thrives on violence, but an unexpected meeting with a close relative in jail, and another inmate's inspiring freestyle rap, leads to a one-two punch of reality.
| 5 | "Judgement Day" | July 24, 2014 | Douglas County, GA |
A sixteen-year-old fighter lies to a judge, and the consequences may keep him locked up.
| 6 | "Blood Orange" | July 31, 2014 | Fulton County, GA |
A 13-year-old boy claims gangs and lights fires. His plans to assault rival gang members are derailed when he gets caught ratting out a thieving convict.

=== Season 8 (2014) ===
| No. | Title | Original release date | Prod. code |
|---|---|---|---|
| 1 | "Tears of a Clown" | December 4, 2014 | Oklahoma City, OK |
Sisters who emulate the violent lyrics and wear the face paint of the Insane Clown Posse. They learn that there is no clowning around in jail.
| 2 | "Mother and Child Reunion" | December 11, 2014 | Hampton Roads, VA |
The jail becomes the scene of an emotional reunion for an incarcerated mother and her 14-year-old daughter, who seems destined for the same fate.
| 3 | "History of Violence" | December 11, 2014 | St. Clair County, IL |
A gangbanger loudly challenges inmates, but is shocked to see a relative behind bars. She then faces a situation after the tour with potentially fatal consequences.
| 4 | "Facing Foxxxxy" | December 18, 2014 | Fulton County, GA |
Rumors lead to violence when a proud gay teen beats a fellow classmate, sending her to the hospital and him to jail where he gets an eye-opening lesson in restraint.
| 5 | "The Harder They Fall" | December 18, 2014 | Chester County, SC |
An abusive 16-year-old rapper challenges the power of the deputies, who then team together to restrain the troubled teen.

=== Season 9 (2015) ===
| No. | Title | Original release date | Prod. code |
|---|---|---|---|
| 1 | "Wasted Time" | June 25, 2015 | Fulton County, GA |
A very aggressive 15-year-old whose attacks on his mother forced her to Taser and pepper-spray him in self-defense, and to send him on a tour of a jail.
| 2 | "Dep. Lyle Lays Down the Law" | July 2, 2015 | Floyd County, GA |
Unpredictable Deputy Lyle bullies, coaxes and comforts to help create new futures for a car-jacking gangbanger, a shoplifting party girl, a violent fighter and a granny-robbing thief.
| 3 | "Jail House Cookies" | July 9, 2015 | Hampton Roads, VA |
A 16-year-old gangbanger physically challenges the officers and inmates at nearly every step of the tour.
| 4 | "Cornflake, Sandbag & Frozen" | July 16, 2015 | Chester County, SC |
After an 18 year-old is caught at school, unaware she is carrying someone else's weapons, her only hope for a clean slate is to take part in the youth intervention program.
| 5 | "Weekend Worriers" | July 23, 2015 | Dougherty County, GA |
Starting fires, stealing guns and cars and assaulting their mom, baby-faced brothers must grow up fast to survive in jail.
| 6 | "Concrete & Steel" | July 30, 2015 | Douglas County, GA |
A four-time runaway refuses to back down to inmates or deputies, but finds an unlikely ally behind bars.
| 7 | "Final Jeopardy" | August 6, 2015 | Richland County, SC |
Caught on video violently attacking his mother a 14-year-old bully gets a taste of his own brutality during a long overnight stay in jail.
| 8 | "Uncle Inmate" | August 13, 2015 | Oklahoma County, OK |
Angry sisters think they're tough enough for jail, until they are startled to discover a family member serving time.
| 9 | "Lexi's Lockup Lash-Out" | August 20, 2015 | St. Clair County, IL |
A spoiled, fighting gang member steals from the poor to give to herself. When she is confronted by a swarm of angry inmates in jail, she physically fights back, launching the entire cellblock into chaos and lockdown.
| 10 | "Buttoning Buttons" | August 27, 2015 | Douglas County, GA |
An angry 14-year-old bully and thief, meets a devoted deputy who tries to help open her mind to letting go of her tragic past.
| 11 | "Lights Out!" | September 3, 2015 | N/A |
This special looks back on the series on how it reached out to more than 550 troubled teens.

== Controversy ==
=== Criticism ===
The television series has no involvement with creating the juvenile diversion programs that it documents, filming programs that were already in jails and prisons across the country. Two Department of Justice officials argued that the program was “not only ineffective but is potentially harmful." The series has been criticized due to the teens being in jail with adults which were considered life-threatening and dangerous, and that the show violated the Juvenile Justice and Delinquency Prevention Act of 1974 (JJDPA).

== Related shows ==
- The World's Strictest Parents
- The Principal's Office
- Teen Trouble
- Sleeping with the Family
- Scared Straight!
