= Witt/Thomas Productions =

American television and movie production company

- Type: Production company
- Industry: Television production
- Founded: 1973; 53 years ago
- Defunct: 2016; 10 years ago
- Fate: Still producing telefilms on occasional basis
- Key people: Paul Junger Witt; Tony Thomas (both; founders); Susan Harris; John Rich; Gilbert Junger; Don Reo; Mitchell Hurwitz; Gary S. Levine
- Products: Television programs

Witt/Thomas Productions was an American television and movie production company run by TV producers Paul Junger Witt and Tony Thomas. The company was consistently productive between its founding in 1973 and 1999, but is still active, producing an occasional film or TV series project. It has produced more than 25 American primetime television series, mostly half-hour sitcoms. Witt/Thomas is perhaps best known for producing the popular sitcoms Soap, Benson, It's a Living, The Golden Girls (along with its sequel, The Golden Palace), Empty Nest, Blossom, Nurses and Brotherly Love. Witt and Thomas have also produced many cinematic works, including the 1989 box office collection success Dead Poets Society.

Numerous Witt/Thomas television series were created and co-executive produced by Susan Harris, then Witt's wife. The shows that had involvement from Harris were produced under the modified title Witt/Thomas/Harris Productions.

== History ==
=== Work with other creators and producers ===
During the 1980s and '90s, Witt/Thomas continued their producing streak, with many of their shows still involving Harris, and several served by other creators. From 1979 until 1983, John Rich (later known for co-producing MacGyver with Henry Winkler) was a top-tier producer with Witt and Thomas on Benson, and later on the company's short-lived Condo. In 1991, Rich briefly returned to the company as an executive producer on the short-lived NBC sitcom Walter & Emily.

Witt/Thomas brought It's a Living to ABC's fall schedule in 1980, a comedy centered on four buxom waitresses who worked for a posh restaurant atop a Los Angeles hotel, and the fraternizing that went on between them. The series, created by Stu Silver, Dick Clair, and Jenna McMahon, ran on ABC for two seasons, with the second season airing under the modified title Making a Living. Syndication reruns, which aired a year after the series' cancellation (see below), brought the show a whole new audience; the series was revived under its original title for first-run syndication, and ran four additional seasons (1985–1989). Witt/Thomas also produced the short-lived 1983 ABC sitcom Condo, from creator Sheldon Bull. Although it had no involvement from Susan Harris, Condo featured elements of Soap, in which two families, related by marriage, were the focus, along with the in-fighting that went on between both sides. Other Witt/Thomas series during the mid-1980s that were created by people other than Susan Harris included the short-lived CBS sitcom Tough Cookies (1986), which starred Robby Benson as a young maverick detective, and One Big Family (1986–1987), a first-run syndication series which was the third (and final) Witt/Thomas comedy vehicle for Danny Thomas. The latter was the only series from the company in which one of the partners (Witt) had co-creation credit, in this case with David Pollock and Elias Davis.

In 1990, Golden Girls writers/producers Tracy Gamble and Richard Vaczy were hired by Witt/Thomas to create a sitcom pilot, which was ultimately not picked up for series status. In June of that year, their summer pilot We'll Take Manhattan aired, in which Jackée Harry and Corinne Bohrer starred as polar opposites—a sassy city girl and a naive Southern belle, respectively—who attempt to make it in New York City together. The cast also featured Joel Brooks, Fred Applegate, and Edan Gross (who had recently starred with Bohrer on the ABC sitcom Free Spirit). We'll Take Manhattan was NBC's second attempt to place Jackée in her own headlined series after her departure from the network's 227, on which she found massive fame. Her first starring vehicle, the 227 spinoff Jackée, had not been picked up the previous year. Gamble and Vaczy had previously worked on 227 before their hiring by Witt/Thomas.

In 1991, Witt/Thomas struck a development deal with the young Fox network, for a pilot created and written by Andy Guerdat and Steve Kreinberg, who had first worked for Witt/Thomas as writers on It's a Living from 1985 to 1987, among their numerous other credits. The pilot was Herman's Head, an irreverent sitcom starring William Ragsdale as a young publishing-company fact checker whose thought processes were explored through a "Greek chorus" of human emotions that lived in his head. The series developed a cult following on Fox upon its September 1991 premiere, and lasted three seasons.

Paul Perlove, who had served as an executive producer during the first season of the Witt/Thomas series Blossom (see below), created his own series for the company, Walter & Emily, which had a brief run on NBC from November 1991 until February 1992. It starred Cloris Leachman and Brian Keith in the title roles, and focused on the generation gaps they faced between their adult son and grandson.

Witt/Thomas launched their second series for Fox in the fall of 1992, which perhaps had the most unusual premise of all of their shows: Woops!, a comedy taking place in a postapocalyptic US, in which six adult survivors of the mysterious nuclear blast found themselves congregating in an abandoned farm house and living together, depending on each other for survival. The series was created and co-executive produced by Gary Jacobs, following his producing work on the successful Empty Nest, and featured Evan Handler, Fred Applegate, and Lane Davies (who had worked on Good & Evil in 1991) in the cast. The wild premise for Woops! was perceived as being somewhat limited in its development, due to the small Earth population in the storyline, but the series only had a few months to prove itself before getting axed in December 1992.

In 1994, David Landsberg (a former producer of Blossom and Herman's Head), and Brenda Hampton (another Blossom producer), had a Witt/Thomas pilot of theirs, Daddy's Girls, be picked up by CBS. Dudley Moore headlined this comedy, in which his character, Dudley Walker, a flamboyant Englishman whose deceased wife leaves him a clothing empire, tries to balance his empire along with fussing over his three attractive young daughters (played by Stacy Galina, Meredith Scott Lynn, and Keri Russell). Playing opposite Moore was Harvey Fierstein in a rare TV series role, as Dudley's prissy, overtly gay business partner. Critics lambasted Daddy's Girls even before its September 1994 debut, predicting it would not last until Christmas; CBS indeed only aired three episodes, before placing it on a hiatus from which it ended up never returning.

Later in the 1994–95 season, CBS picked up another Witt/Thomas pilot, The Office, created by veteran producer Susan Beavers (who had previously produced Nurses for Witt/Thomas) and Barbara Corday, co-creator of former CBS feminist-slanted police drama Cagney & Lacey. The comedy centered on the camaraderie of numerous executives and their secretaries at a packaging company, with the cast headed by Valerie Harper and Dakin Matthews. The series had a brief spring run during March and April 1995. It has no relation to the later British series The Office, or its American NBC counterpart (2005–2013).

In 1996, the last Witt/Thomas development deal with Fox resulted in the short-lived sitcom Local Heroes. Created by Frank Mula, a writer and producer of The Simpsons, the comedy was described as a "blue-collar version of Friends", as it depicted the close-knit friendship of several young men and women who were just getting by in a small town. Local Heroes notably starred Jay Mohr, along with three actors from previous Witt/Thomas series — Jason Kristofer, from the short-lived Heartland (1989), Ken Hudson Campbell of Herman's Head, and Kristin Dattilo of the previous year's The Office.

Keeping with the tradition of elevating producers within the company to creators, Witt/Thomas gave Mitchell Hurwitz, who had numerous producing roles on many Witt/Thomas series throughout the 1990s, the chance to create his own project, Everything's Relative, which turned up as a spring replacement series on NBC in 1999. A family comedy about an eccentric, slightly immature couple (Jeffrey Tambor and Jill Clayburgh) and their adult, upscale-professional, but equally immature sons (Kevin Rahm and Eric Schaeffer), it received positive reviews that likened the diverse, interlocking stories to that of Seinfeld. Nonetheless, NBC only aired the series four times in April 1999 before cancelling it. Hurwitz later teamed up with Ron Howard and 20th Century Fox to create and produce the Fox sitcom Arrested Development, in which he again cast Jeffrey Tambor as an eccentric patriarch of an equally quirky family. In 1998, Nina Wass joined the company as president. She later left to join her startup company at Disney in August 1999, eventually partnering with Gene Stein.

Although it was not immediately realized, the quick demise of Everything's Relative soon marked the end of Witt/Thomas Productions' 24-year television series producing streak. The company, however, remained intact, producing an occasional made-for-TV movie thereafter. Witt and Thomas came out of their TV series retirement in 2012, with the revival of their dramatic series Beauty and the Beast.

==== Don Reo ====
In 1987, screenwriter Don Reo began his involvement with Witt/Thomas, writing for their NBC project Mama's Boy. Reo soon went on to create several series for the company, in conjunction with his nameplate, Impact Zone Productions. His first creation was the CBS sitcom Heartland, which starred Brian Keith as a cantankerous Nebraska farmer who moves in with his daughter, son-in-law, and grandchildren. The series had a brief run in the spring of 1989, but Reo had other projects for Witt/Thomas that would soon hit the air. During the 1990–91 season, two more Reo series from Witt/Thomas premiered: Lenny, a sitcom vehicle for comedian Lenny Clarke, which debuted on CBS in September 1990; and Blossom, an NBC series starring Mayim Bialik whose pilot was previewed on July 5, 1990, and whose series premiere occurred on January 3, 1991. Lenny was a ratings failure, and was cancelled by CBS in March 1991; Blossom was more successful, enjoying a strong following among teenaged viewers on NBC's youth-oriented Monday-night comedy block (alongside freshman hit The Fresh Prince of Bel-Air), and ultimately ran until 1995, lasting five seasons.

Following up his Blossom success for NBC, Reo acquired John Larroquette for a project soon after the conclusion of his long-running sitcom Night Court. This resulted in The John Larroquette Show on NBC's fall 1993 schedule. The first season of The John Larroquette Show specialized in dark, seedy humor unusual for network television. Despite critical acclaim, it was nearly cancelled by NBC at the end of its first season. The network ended up renewing the show on the agreement that Reo and Witt/Thomas would lighten the show's tone and introduce more upbeat stories. Larroquette went through two more renewal periods on NBC, until getting cancelled in October 1996, just five weeks into its fourth season. Reo created one more series for Witt/Thomas, the Rhea Perlman vehicle Pearl, which ran on CBS during the 1996–97 season, in which Perlman joined Reo, Witt, Thomas, and Gary S. Levine as an executive producer.

==== Gary S. Levine ====
Witt and Thomas again took on a third partner in their production team, when they inducted Gary S. Levine as a top-tier producer in the company in 1994. He was president of that television division in 1993. Levine worked with Witt/Thomas for the next three years on five of their new shows, and was listed along with them on each show's top "executive producers" credit. His surname, however, was never added to the Witt/Thomas Productions names (similar to how former partner John Rich was never incorporated into the company name; Susan Harris, as Witt's wife, remains the only third partner to have her name included in the production marquee).

Witt/Thomas and Levine's first project together provided yet another Blossom producer, Rob LaZebnik, the chance to create his own pilot. The project was greenlighted by the upstart The WB television network in 1994. For The WB's launch in January 1995, the company produced the LaZebnik creation Muscle, yet another soap-opera spoof, this time taking on the youth-oriented dramas of the 1990s, primarily Melrose Place. The series, like Susan Harris creations Soap and Good & Evil before it, was critically acclaimed; The WB, however, cancelled it at the end of its first season (it was, in fact, the first series to be cancelled on the new network).

A year later, Witt/Thomas and Levine produced a new LaZebnik series, Common Law, which premiered on ABC in September 1996. The series was lauded for featuring a lead character of Latino heritage (played by Greg Giraldo) in a prestigious profession, that of partner in his own law firm. Despite the praise, Common Law suffered from low ratings, airing Saturdays at 9:30/8:30 C. ABC cancelled the series after only a month on the air (just a week before NBC abruptly dropped its Witt/Thomas sister series, The John Larroquette Show).

In the fall of 1995, Witt/Thomas and Levine had two new youth-oriented comedies of theirs premiere on NBC's Sunday schedule, Brotherly Love and Minor Adjustments. When Blossom was concluding its run the previous spring, two of its producers, Jonathan Schmock and Jim Vallely, received a development deal with NBC and Witt/Thomas that would give Blossom star Joey Lawrence his own starring vehicle. The result was Brotherly Love, in which Lawrence played an entirely new character alongside real-life brothers Matthew and Andrew Lawrence. Following the series was Minor Adjustments, a comedy about a child psychologist and his relationships with his family and patients, starring stand-up comic Rondell Sheridan. The series was created by Sheridan, Ken Estin, and Dwayne Johnson-Cochran, and certain episodes were directed by Soap and Empty Nest star Dinah Manoff. Minor Adjustments was cancelled by NBC in December 1995, but in a rather unusual move, the fledgling UPN network bought the show's rights, and returned it to the air only one month later, thus allowing the series to continue its freshman season. By the spring of 1996, UPN had cancelled Minor Adjustments, as well, and Brotherly Love was dropped by NBC, only to get a second (and final) season on The WB.

Levine also partnered with Witt and Thomas during the 1996–97 season to co-executive produce the company's CBS sitcom, Pearl.

=== Beauty and the Beast ===
Witt/Thomas, while primarily known for comedies, ventured into the production of a dramatic series in 1987, with the CBS fantasy drama Beauty and the Beast. Creator Ron Koslow and parent studio TriStar Television hired Witt and Thomas as executive producers on the series when the two wished to diversify their TV series-producing resume (Koslow had first worked with Witt/Thomas on their 1984 theatrical film Firstborn). The early success of Beauty and the Beast made Witt and Thomas one of the most prolific showrunners on American network TV in the late 1980s, between their working for two different studios simultaneously (Touchstone and Tri-Star) and the ratings success of their series. Witt and Thomas served as executive producers for all three seasons of Beauty and the Beast, and for the majority of their career, it remained the only hour-long dramatic series produced by Witt/Thomas Productions.

In 2012, Koslow, Witt and Thomas had pitched a new version of Beauty & the Beast to The CW network. In May of that year, the series was picked up for The CW's 2012–13 fall schedule, and had its premiere on October 11, 2012. An entirely new cast is featured in the revival, in many of the same roles that appeared in the CBS version. Although Koslow is involved in the new series as an executive producer, the format for the revival was created by Sherri Cooper and Jennifer Levin. Witt and Thomas again served as executive producers, marking the first time in 13 years that the two have produced a weekly primetime series together. The series concluded in 2016.

=== Lean years and return to TV series producing ===
In 2014, after having been back into TV series producing for two years with The CW's Beauty and the Beast, Witt/Thomas announced that they had screened a sitcom pilot written by Sally Robinson (best known for penning Lifetime's 2012 remake of Steel Magnolias) under the working title Feed Me. Witt and Thomas agreed to produce it, and soon shopped it to NBC, which put it in the running for fall 2014 comedy pilots. While the network had it under consideration, Witt and Thomas were lauded by the press for making a much-heralded return to sitcom producing, the last of which had been 15 years prior, and for resuming a relationship with NBC, which had been home to their classic hits The Golden Girls, Empty Nest, and many other Witt/Thomas shows. Feed Me was described as centering on "..a dysfunctional family bound by love and the restaurant they run together." The series was slated to star Mary-Louise Parker (a headlining role in response to her success on Showtime's Weeds), along with Andrea Parker, Ed Quinn, and Toks Olagundoye. In May 2014, however, NBC passed on the pilot.

=== Distribution and parent studios ===
Throughout its history, Witt/Thomas Productions has housed its shows at a number of different parent studios. With their first two series in the 1975–1976 season, Fay and The Practice, Witt/Thomas worked in association with Universal Television and Metro-Goldwyn-Mayer, respectively. Their 1977 CBS sitcom, Loves Me, Loves Me Not, remains to date the only series from the company to be produced at 20th Century Fox Television. Beginning with Soap, and encompassing all of their ABC series that aired between 1977 and 1986, Witt/Thomas started the practice of completely financing their shows themselves, without the presence of a parent studio. On most of the shows from this era, "A Witt/Thomas/Harris Production" was featured at the end of their closing-credit sequences, with copyright notice going to Witt/Thomas/Harris in lieu of a major studio, but during the 1982–83 season, the short-lived It Takes Two and Condo had their copyright notices go to a dummy company that was named after the respective program (i.e. "It Takes Two Productions" and "Condo Productions", respectively). With the latter shows, the Witt/Thomas/Harris or Witt/Thomas bylines still appeared before the "dummy" copyright.

When Soap and Benson both went into off-network reruns during the early 1980s, their syndication rights were sold to Columbia Pictures Television. For the 1983–84 season, Witt/Thomas also chose to off-network syndicate reruns of their recent short-lived series, namely It's a Living and It Takes Two. Distribution of these shows was handled by Golden West Television, which provided the production facilities for most Witt/Thomas shows. It's a Living and It Takes Two were the rare instances of series going into rerun syndication when they each lasted far shorter than four seasons, or 100 episodes, the normal minimum for syndication. Living later surpassed the syndication minimum, though, with its original 1985–1989 episodes in first-run syndication being added several years later.

With the launch of The Golden Girls in 1985, Witt/Thomas moved their series to Touchstone Television, which went on to produce several more of their shows afterward. This company also has a contract to produce feature films. During the 1985–86 season, Benson remained independent of a major studio during what turned out to be its final season, while the first season of the It's a Living first-run syndication revival had Golden West as its parent studio. Golden West was acquired by Lorimar-Telepictures in 1986, with certain Witt/Thomas series being divested to Buena Vista Television for syndication distribution at that time, but both the reruns and current original episodes of It's a Living, as well as the first-run syndicated One Big Family, had distribution handled by Lorimar-Telepictures from September 1986 onward. Witt/Thomas also worked with Republic Pictures from 1987 until 1990, for CBS' Beauty and the Beast. Although Witt-Thomas was a partner in TeleVentures along with Tri-Star Pictures and Stephen J. Cannell Productions, it managed to distribute Mama's Boy and Heartland. Eventually, in late 1988, Witt-Thomas-Harris severed its ties with TeleVentures and shifted its distribution exclusively to Disney.

In 1992, while continuing to work with Touchstone, Witt/Thomas began to house several of their new series at Warner Bros. Television, and distribution of feature films through Warner Bros. Pictures, for subsidiary Witt/Thomas Films. The John Larroquette Show was the first of these projects to be produced under Warner Bros. For the next three years, the producers continued their series at both studios, although after the premiere of Brotherly Love in 1995, all new Witt/Thomas series were exclusively launched under Warner Bros. The company's Touchstone association ended in 1996, when production of Brotherly Love was moved to Walt Disney Television for its second and last year, which also coincided with the series' move from NBC to The WB. After the 1996–97 season, Witt/Thomas was only working with Warner Bros. for the remaining two series it launched after that point, The Secret Lives of Men and Everything's Relative.

With Witt and Thomas' return to producing a primetime series, the 2012 revival of Beauty and the Beast is housed at CBS Television Studios. Their 2014 sitcom pilot Feed Me was produced in association with Universal Television. Paul Junger Witt died in 2018.

== List of shows produced by either production team ==
=== Witt/Thomas/Harris Productions ===
- Fay (1975–1976)
- Loves Me, Loves Me Not (1977)
- Soap (1977–1981)
- Benson (1979–1986)
- I'm a Big Girl Now (1980–1981)
- It Takes Two (1982–1983)
- Hail to the Chief (1985)
- The Golden Girls (1985–1992)
- Mama's Boy (1987–1988, six sitcom specials intended to be a series)
- Empty Nest (1988–1995)
- Nurses (1991–1994)
- Good & Evil (1991)
- The Golden Palace (1992–1993)
- The Secret Lives of Men (1998)

=== Witt/Thomas Productions ===
==== Television series ====
- The Practice (1976–1977)
- It's a Living (1980–1982, 1985–1989)
- Condo (1983)
- Tough Cookies (1986)
- One Big Family (1986–1987)
- Beauty and the Beast (1987–1990)
- Heartland (1989)
- Lenny (1990–1991)
- Blossom (1991–1995)
- Herman's Head (1991–1994)
- Walter & Emily (1991–1992)
- Woops! (1992)
- The John Larroquette Show (1993–1996)
- Daddy's Girls (1994)
- Muscle (1995)
- The Office (1995)
- Brotherly Love (1995–1997)
- Minor Adjustments (1995–1996)
- Local Heroes (1996)
- Common Law (1996)
- Pearl (1996–1997)
- Everything's Relative (1999)
- Beauty & the Beast (revival; 2012–2016)

==== Pilot specials ====
- We'll Take Manhattan (1990 comedy pilot, aired as an NBC summer special)
- Feed Me (2014, rejected NBC sitcom pilot)

==== Made-for-television films ====
Although Witt/Thomas Productions was not formed until 1975, the first several TV movies produced by Witt and Thomas are included in this list. During the early 1970s, Witt was a general producer on these TV movies, while Thomas held an associate producer credit.

- Brian's Song (1971)
- No Place to Run (1972)
- Home for the Holidays (1972)
- A Cold Night's Death (1973)
- The Letters (1973)
- Blood Sport (1973, with Danny Thomas Productions)
- Remember When (1974, with Danny Thomas Productions)
- The Gun and the Pulpit (1974, with Danny Thomas Productions)
- Satan's Triangle (1975, with Danny Thomas Productions)
- Griffin and Phoenix (1976)
- High Risk (1976, with Danny Thomas Productions)
- Trouble in High Timber Country (1980)
- The Line (1987)
- The Earth Day Special (1990)
- Country Estates (1993)
- Close to Home (1994)
- Radiant City (1996)

==== Theatrical films ====
- Firstborn (1984, known as Moving In in Europe)
- Dead Poets Society (1989)
- Final Analysis (1992)
- Mixed Nuts (1994)
- Three Kings (1999)
- Insomnia (2002)
- A Better Life (2011)
