= List of horror films of 1993 =

A list of horror films released in 1993.

Title	Director(s)	Cast	Country	Notes	Ref.
Amityville: A New Generation	John Murlowski	Ross Partridge, Julia Nickson-Soul, Lala Sloatman, David Naughton	United States	Released direct to video	
Body Bags	John Carpenter, Tobe Hooper	Roger Corman, Wes Craven, Mark Hamill, Stacy Keach, Twiggy, Robert Carradine, Debbie Harry, Sheena Easton	United States	Television film Co-produced by John Carpenter	
Body Melt	Philip Brophy	Gerard Kennedy, Andrew Daddo, Ian Smith	Australia		
Cannibal! The Musical	Trey Parker	Trey Parker, Matt Stone, Dian Bachar	United States		
Carnosaur	Adam Simon	Diane Ladd, Patricia Harrington, Jennifer Runyon, Clint Howard	United States	Produced by Roger Corman	
Children of the Corn II: The Final Sacrifice	David F. Price	Terence Knox, Paul Scherrer, Ryan Bollman	United States	Based on the works of Stephen King	
Cronos	Guillermo del Toro	Federico Luppi, Ron Perlman, Claudio Brook	Mexico		
The Dark Half	George A. Romero	Timothy Hutton, Amy Madigan, Michael Rooker, Julie Harris	United States	Based on the Stephen King novel	
Dark Universe	Steve Latshaw	Joe Estevez, Bently Tittle, Laurie Sherman, Blake Pickett	United States	Produced by Jim Wynorski and Fred Olen Ray	
Dollman vs. Demonic Toys	Charles Band	Tim Thomerson, Melissa Behr, Peter Chen, Tracy Scoggins	United States	Produced by Charles Band	
Full Eclipse	Anthony Hickox	Patsy Kensit, Mario Van Peebles, Victoria Rowell	United States		
Ghost Brigade	George Hickenlooper	Corbin Bernsen, Adrian Pasdar, Martin Sheen, Billy Bob Thornton, David Arquette	United States		
Ghost in the Machine	Rachel Talalay	Karen Allen, Chris Mulkey, Ted Marcoux	United States		
The Good Son	Joseph Ruben	Macaulay Culkin, Elijah Wood, Wendy Crewson, David Morse, Jacqueline Brookes	United States	Horror dark comedy	
Guwapings Dos	Jose Javier Reyes, Joey Marquez, Manny Castañeda	Mark Anthony Fernandez, Jomari Yllana, Eric Fructuoso, Alma Moreno, Aga Muhlach, Joey Marquez, William Martinez, John Estrada, Abby Viduya, Chanda Romero	Philippines	Horror comedy	
Hocus Pocus	Kenny Ortega	Bette Midler, Sarah Jessica Parker, Kathy Najimy	United States	Horror comedy	
Jack Be Nimble	Garth Maxwell	Alexis Arquette, Sarah Smuts-Kennedy	New Zealand		
Jason Goes to Hell: The Final Friday	Adam Marcus	John D. LeMay, Kari Keegan, Kane Hodder, Steven Williams	United States	Produced by Sean S. Cunningham	
Kalifornia	Dominic Sena	Brad Pitt, David Duchovny, Juliette Lewis, Michelle Forbes	United States		
Leprechaun	Mark Jones	Warwick Davis, Jennifer Aniston, Ken Olandt	United States		
Little Cory Gory	Bill Morroni	Edinia Scuddi, Todd Fortune, Sabino Villa Lobos	United States		
Mahakaal	Shyam Ramsay, Tulsi Ramsay	Archana Puran Singh, Reema Lagoo, Kulbhushan Kharbanda	India		
Maniac Cop III: Badge of Silence	William Lustig, Joel Soisson	Robert Davi, Caitlin Dulany, Gretchen Becker	United States	Written by Larry Cohen	
Man's Best Friend	John Lafia	Ally Sheedy, Lance Henriksen, Robert Costanzo	United States		
Necronomicon (a.k.a. H. P. Lovecraft's Necronomicon)	Brian Yuzna, Christophe Gans	Jeffrey Combs, Bruce Payne, Tony Azito, David Warner, Richard Lynch	United States	Horror Anthology; Special effects supervised by Tom Savini	
Needful Things	Fraser C. Heston	Max von Sydow, Ed Harris, Bonnie Bedelia	United States	Based on the Stephen King novel	
Night Owl	Jeffrey Arsenault	John Leguizamo, James Raftery, Ali Thomas	United States		
Night Terrors	Tobe Hooper	Robert Englund, Zoe Trilling, Alona Kimhi	United States	Produced by Harry Alan Towers; Filmed in Israel	
Ozone (a.k.a. Street Zombies)	J. R. Bookwalter	Wayne A. Harold, J. R. Bookwalter, Heather Smith	United States		
Puppet Master 4: The Demon	Jeff Burr	Gordon Currie, Chandra West, Jason Adams	United States	Produced by Charles Band	
Rakter Swad	Dhruba Dutta	Prosenjit Chatterjee, Debashree Roy, Dilip Roy	India		
Return of the Living Dead 3	Brian Yuzna	Melinda Clarke, J. Trevor Edmond, Kent McCord, Sarah Douglas	United States		
Savage Vengeance	Donald Farmer	Vickie Kehl, George Maranville, Melissa Moore	United States		
Schramm	Jörg Buttgereit	Monika M., Beatrice Manowski, Eddi Zacharias	Germany		
Skeeter	Clark Brandon	Tracy Griffith, Jim Youngs, Charles Napier, Michael J. Pollard	United States		
Subspecies 2: Bloodstone	Ted Nicolaou	Anders Hove, Melanie Shatner, Kevin Blair	United States		
Things	Jay Woelfel, Dennis Devine	Courtney Lercara, Neil Delama, Kelly-Jean Dammeyer	United States		
Ticks	Tony Randel	Rosalind Allen, Ami Dolenz, Seth Green	United States		
To Sleep with a Vampire	Adam Friedman	Charlie Spradling, Scott Valentine, Ingrid Vold	United States		
The Tommyknockers	John Power	Jimmy Smits, Marg Helgenberger, Joanna Cassidy, Traci Lords, E.G. Marshall, Robert Carradine	United States	Television film Based on the Stephen King novel	
Trauma	Dario Argento	Chris Rydell, Asia Argento, Piper Laurie, Brad Dourif	Italy; United States		
The Untold Story	Herman Yau	Anthony Wong, Danny Lee	Hong Kong		
The Vanishing	George Sluizer	Jeff Bridges, Kiefer Sutherland, Nancy Travis, Sandra Bullock	United States		
Warlock: The Armageddon	Anthony Hickox	Julian Sands, Chris Young, Paula Marshall	United States	Sequel to Warlock (1989)	
Witchboard 2: The Devil's Doorway	Kevin S. Tenney	Ami Dolenz, Christopher Michael Moore, Laraine Newman	United States	Sequel to Witchboard (1986)	
Witchcraft V: Dance with the Devil	Talun Hsu	Freddy Andreiuci, Ayesha Hauer, Drew Peloso	United States		
The Witching	Eric Black, Matthew Jason Walsh	Auggi Alvarez, Carol Barta, Veronica Orr	United States		
Zombie Bloodbath	Todd Sheets	Jerry Angell, Cathy Metz, Auggi Alvarez	United States		

== Sources ==
- Muir, John Kenneth (2011). Horror Films of the 1990s. Jefferson, North Carolina: McFarland. ISBN 978-0-786-48480-5.
- Young, R. G. (2000). The Encyclopedia of Fantastic Film: Ali Baba to Zombies. Hal Leonard Corporation. ISBN 1-55783-269-2.
