= A Kiss So Deadly =

1996 television film directed by Chuck Bowman

A Kiss So Deadly is a 1996 made-for-television thriller directed by Chuck Bowman.

== Cast ==
- Charles Shaughnessy as Tom Deese
- Dedee Pfeiffer as Catherine Deese
- Tom Bresnahan as Todd Gale
- Noelle Parker as June Stern
- Kerrie Keane as Addy Deese
- Charlotte Ross as Amanda Blake
- Scott Simpson as Stalker
- Jeffrey Pillars as Ray
- Robert Catrini as Craig
- Paul Sincoff as Officer Cruz
- Tim Gardner as Officer Chaso
- Nina Repeta as Waitress
- Jeff Hochendoner as Bartender
- William Gregory Lee as Adam
- Steve Posner as Professor
- Michael Genevie as Det. Ron Marin
- Hank Troscianiec as First Cop
- Brian Keith Gamble (credited as Brian Gamble) as Second Cop
- Julián Vicente as Detective
- Barry Bell as Condo Supervisor

== Crew ==
- Directed by Chuck Bowman
- Written by Nevin Schreiner (story and teleplay) and Monica Parker (story)
- Produced by Chuck Bowman, Jennifer Alward (executive producer) and Jill Proctor (associate producer)
- Music by Joseph Conlan
- Cinematography by Karl Herrmann
- Edited by Jonathon Braun

== Plot ==
Tom Deese (Charles Shaughnessy) falls in love with his daughter's roommate, Amanda (Charlotte Ross), and becomes the focus of his daughter Catherine's (Dedee Pfeiffer) suspicions when Amanda is murdered.

== Reception ==
Variety film critic Tony Scott, wrote that Shaughnessy ‘doesn’t do much convincing’ and that his former Days of Our Lives co-star Ross fared better, giving her character ‘an easygoing, even sympathetic, quality.’ He also noted Pfeiffer's ‘intelligent face’ and felt that Simpson ‘turns in the best scene of the production when he rasps into a phone.’ Scott added that the production was technically sound, but faults were the result of Schreiner's ‘absurd script.’
