= We'll Take Manhattan =

We'll Take Manhattan may refer to:

- We'll Take Manhattan (1990 film), an American television pilot featuring Jackée Harry
- We'll Take Manhattan (2012 film), a British television biopic
- We'll Take Manhattan, a 1967 television pilot produced by Hanna-Barbera Productions
- We'll Take Manhattan, a 2000 collected edition of the comics series Gen¹³

== See also ==
- "We'll have Manhattan", a lyric from the 1925 song "Manhattan", written by Richard Rodgers and Lorenz Hart
- "First We Take Manhattan", a 1987 song by Leonard Cohen
