= Little Dracula (TV series) =

1991 French-German-British-American animated series

- Voices of: Edan Gross; Joe Flaherty; Jonathan Winters; Kath Soucie; Brian Cummings; Neil Ross
- Theme music composer: Andrew Dimitroff; Stephen C. Marston; Barry Trop
- Country of origin: United States
- No. of episodes: 13 (3 unaired)

Production
- Executive producer: Steven Hahn
- Producers: Mike Young; Michael Hack; Pawn Evans; Marlene Sharp
- Running time: 30 minutes (including commercials)
- Production companies: Steven Hahn Productions; Sachs Family Entertainment; Bandai Entertainment

Original release
- Network: FOX (Fox Kids); M6
- Release: 3 September 1991 – 13 October 1999

Little Dracula is a 1991 American animated series directed by Joe Pearson with original music by Stephen C. Marston under Walker Hahn Productions. It debuted on Fox Kids on 3 September 1991 and features the voices of several veteran comedians and actors. Based on the book series of the same name, thirteen episodes were produced, but only six were aired; five episodes aired the week of 3 – 6 September, before its timeslot was given to Beetlejuice. A sixth episode aired on Halloween. It was during this initial run that the Little Dracula franchise made its way to a handful of merchandising deals.

In 1999, Fox Family reran Little Dracula, including four episodes which had not aired during the original run (another three remained unaired). Some Little Dracula books were also republished following this brief revival.

A second season (13 more episodes) was co-produced with France and Germany, by IDDH, M6, and Renaissance-Atlantic Films. It never aired in the United States. In Europe, Little Dracula (Draculito, mon saigneur) is an animated series in 26 episodes.

The series became available on the Kabillion YouTube channel on November 15, 2026.

== Cast ==
- Edan Gross as Little Dracula
- Joe Flaherty as Big Dracula
- Jonathan Winters as Igor and Granny
- Kath Soucie as Mrs. Dracula and Millicent
- Brian Cummings as Garlic Man
- Neil Ross as Maggot
- Danny Mann as No Eyes and Twin Beaks
- Melvyn Hayes as Deadwood
- Joey Camen as Werebunny
- Fran Ryan as Hannah the Barbarian

== Episodes ==
=== Season 1, part 1 (Fox Kids, 1991) ===
No.	Title	Original release date	Prod. code
1	"The Curse of the Ghastly Minimum Wage"	3 September 1991	103
2	"Little D's First Bite" "Ghoul Days"	4 September 1991	102
3	"Little D's Surprise"	5 September 1991	101
4	"The Bite Before Christmas"	6 September 1991	105
5	"Little D Goes Hawaiian"	7 September 1991	106
6	"Little D's Halloween"	31 October 1991	104

=== Season 1, part 2 (Fox Family, 1999) ===
No.	Title	Original release date	Prod. code
7	"Bat Boys"	12 September 1999	107
8	"Easy Biters"	14 September 1999	108
9	"Deadwood's Complaint"	17 September 1999	109
10	"The Chamber of Unspeakable Terror"	17 September 1999	110
11	"The Bite at the Ghoul School Corral"	3 October 1999	111
12	"Midnight Madness"	11 October 1999	112
13	"Deadly Screentest"	13 October 1999	113

== Home releases ==
Numerous episodes of Little Dracula came to VHS throughout 1993 and '94. Available through Abbey Home Media, they appear to have been made available in PAL format only.

Title	Date	Format	Description	Studio
The Biggest Ever Saturday Morning Heroes	4 October 1993	PAL VHS	Three hours of James Bond Jr., T-Rex, Little Dracula, Teenage Mutant Hero Turtles, Super Mario Bros., Captain N, and The Transformers. 191 minutes.	Abbey Home Entertainment; distributed by Tempo Video
Little Dracula's Fangtastic Video	4 October 1993	PAL VHS	Includes "Bat Boys" and "Easy Biters." 66 minutes.	Abbey Home Entertainment; distributed by Tempo Video
Little Dracula's Video Full of Frightful Surprises	29 December 1993	PAL VHS	Includes "Little D's Surprise," "Deadwood's Complaint," and "The Chamber of Unspeakable Terrors." 65 minutes.	Abbey Home Entertainment; distributed by Tempo Home Video
Little Dracula's Video: With a Bite	28 December 1994	PAL VHS	The adventures of Little Dracula. 66 minutes.	Abbey Home Video; distributed by Tempo Home Video

== Action figures and other merchandise ==
The year Little Dracula debuted on Fox Kids, an action figure collection based on the characters hit store shelves. Produced by Bandai, the line includes Little Dracula, Drac Attack Little Dracula, Igor, Maggot, Werebunny, Garlic Man, Twin Beaks, The Man With No Eyes, and Deadwood. They each feature multiple points of articulation, several meticulous accessories, and a unique action feature (Igor's brain pops up when his arm is lifted). Vehicles of Little Dracula include the Coffin Car, Dracster, Easy-biter Motorcycle, and Garlicmobile.

Other merchandise includes costume and roleplaying sets such as Little Dracula's Vampire Kit and Little Dracula's Scepter & Amulet. Starting January 1992, Harvey Comics also published a 3-part Little Dracula comic book mini-series.

== See also ==
- Vampire film
- List of vampire television series
