= Hidden Hills =

American sitcom television series

- Genre: Sitcom
- Created by: Peter Segal; Ric Swartzlander
- Starring: Justin Louis; Paula Marshall
- Opening theme: Pleasant Valley Sunday
- Composer: Mark Mothersbaugh
- Country of origin: United States
- Original language: English
- No. of seasons: 1
- No. of episodes: 18 (5 unaired)

Production
- Executive producers: Susanne Daniels; Kate Juergens; Peter Segal; Ric Swartzlander
- Producer: Michael Ewing
- Cinematography: Billy Dickson; Peter Smokler
- Editors: Joel Goodman; David Helfand; Karen Segal; Bill Turro; Steve Welch
- Running time: 30 minutes
- Production companies: First Move; Callahan Filmworks; Rude Mood Productions; NBC Studios

Original release
- Network: NBC
- Release: September 24, 2002 – January 21, 2003

Hidden Hills is an American sitcom television series that aired on NBC from September 24, 2002, to January 21, 2003, during the 2002 fall line-up. Based on the book Surviving Suburbia, the series was created by Peter Segal and Ric Swartzlander. The theme song was "Pleasant Valley Sunday", made famous by The Monkees. Mark Mothersbaugh (co-founder of Devo) performed the version used on the show. The show was made by Ric Swartzlander's Rude Mood Productions and NBC.

== Cast ==
=== Main ===
- Justin Louis as Doug Barber
- Paula Marshall as Dr. Janine Barber
- Kristin Bauer as Belinda Slypich
- Stacy Galina as Pam Asher
- Tamara Taylor as Sarah Timmerman
- Dondré Whitfield as Zack Timmerman
- Alexa Nikolas as Emily Barber
- Sean Marquette as Derek Barber

=== Recurring ===
- Cristián de la Fuente as Manolo
- Sandra McCoy as Miss Lily

== Episodes ==
No.	Title	Directed by	Written by	Original release date	Prod. code
1	"Pilot"	Robert Berlinger	Peter Segal & Ric Swartzlander	September 24, 2002	01001
2	"The Mark of Manolo"	Michael Engler	Barbie Feldman	October 1, 2002	01003
3	"The Affair"	Robert Berlinger	Gayle Abrams	October 8, 2002	01004
4	"The Vasectomy"	Robert Berlinger	Lester Lewis	October 15, 2002	01006
5	"The Getaway"	Robert Berlinger	Ric Swartzlander	October 22, 2002	01002
6	"Halloween"	Michael Engler	Bob Kushell	October 29, 2002	01005
7	"The Shocker"	Lev L. Spiro	Al Sonja L. Rice	November 12, 2002	01008
8	"Coach Doug"	Robert Berlinger	Barbie Feldman	November 19, 2002	01009
9	"The Birth"	Robert Berlinger	Bob Kushell	November 26, 2002	01011
10	"Christmas"	Bryan Gordon	Lester Lewis	December 10, 2002	01010
11	"The Visit"	Craig Zisk	Gayle Abrams	January 7, 2003	01012
12	"The Concert"	Martha Coolidge	Taylor Hamra	January 14, 2003	01014
13	"The Neighbors"	Michael McDonald	Al Sonja L. Rice	January 21, 2003	01013
14	"The Feud"	Robert Berlinger	Jim Gerkin	Unaired	01015
15	"The Reunion"	Lev L. Spiro	Bob Kushell	Unaired	01016
16	"The Birthday"	Lev L. Spiro	Lester Lewis	Unaired	01017
17	"The Housewife"	Lawrence Trilling	Gayle Abrams	Unaired	01018
18	"The Motorcycle"	Alan Myerson	Jim Gerkin	Unaired	01007

== Reception ==
An article in The Record newspaper in New Jersey stated that "Hidden Hills features the usual sitcom theme of jealousy but tackles it with intelligent writing. And Marshall sticks with an honest portrayal that doesn't go over the top."
