= Barry Bell =

American actor and voice actor

- Born: June 22, 1951 (age 74); Raleigh, North Carolina, U.S.
- Occupation: Actor
- Years active: 1976–present
- Spouses: Katherine Cortez (m. 1971–1975) Lorri Lindberg (m. 1986)

Barry Bell (born June 22, 1951) is an American film, television, stage and voice actor. He is best known for portraying Steve Gayton from Stephen King's 1986 film Maximum Overdrive, Barnett Gibons from This World, Then the Fireworks 1997 film, Rocco Petrone from HBO's From the Earth to the Moon 1998, Saul Hertz from Morning 2000 film, Wilkinson from Bruno (2000) film, Lt. Feuer from One of Her Own 1994 (TV) film, Dugan from Legacy 1999 (TV series) and as Mason, CIA from Target Earth a 1998 TV film.

== Filmography ==
=== Film ===
Year	Title	Role	Notes
1976	The Electric Chair	Rev. Samuel Moss	
1983	Reuben, Reuben	Man at Bar	
1984	Chain Gang	Defense Counsel	
1986	Maximum Overdrive	Steve	
1986	Trick or Treat	Cop #2	
1990	The White Girl	Party Goer #2	
1990	Escape	Hitman	
1993	Taking Liberty	Baron Von Wolfsberg	
1994	Radioland Murders	Cop #1	
1995	The Dam	Store Owner	
1997	This World, Then the Fireworks	Barnett Gibons	
2000	Bruno	Wilkinson	
2000	Doomsday Man	Prentiss	
2001	Morning	Saul Hertz	
2012	Speak Now	Phillip	Short Film

=== Television ===
Year	Title	Role	Notes
1993	The Young Indiana Jones Chronicles	Charles MacArthur	Episode: "Young Indiana Jones and the Mystery of the Blues"
1994	Terror in the Night	Ronnie Barnes	TV movie
1994	One of Her Own	Lt. Feuer	TV movie
1994–1995	Matlock	Kurt Becker / Robber / Leo Harmon	4 episodes
1995	American Gothic	Gordy Willis	Episode: "Eye of the Beholder"
1995	Dare to Love	Maitre'd	TV movie
1996	Stolen Memories: Secrets from the Rose Garden	Katie's Dad	TV movie
1996	Sophie & the Moonhanger	KKK Speaker Aldon	TV movie
1996	Twilight Man	Orderly #1	TV movie
1996	The Perfect Daughter	Ken Johnson	TV movie
1996	A Kiss So Deadly	Condo Supervisor	TV movie
1996	A Different Kind of Christmas	Mover	TV movie
1997	To Dance with Olivia	Sheriff	TV movie
1997	Love-Struck		TV movie
1997	Perfect Crime	Agent Fox	TV movie
1998	Target Earth	Mason, CIA	TV movie
1998	Dawson's Creek	Coach	Episode: "Detention"
1998	Walker, Texas Ranger	Dr. Harold Glass	Episode: "Warriors"
1998	The Patron Saint of Liars	Mr. Sanderson	TV movie
1998	From the Earth to the Moon	Rocco Petrone	Episode: "Galileo Was Right"
1998	Carriers	Jonathan Parker	TV movie
1999	Legacy	Mr. Dugan	Episode: "Full House"
1999	CI5: The New Professionals	FBI Agent	Episode: "Orbit"
1999	Nathan Dixon	Grave Digger	TV movie

=== Video games ===
Year	Title	Role	Notes
1998	Dark Side of the Moon: A Sci-Fi Adventure	Einar Grice	
