= Mama's Boy (TV series) =

- Genre: Sitcom
- Created by: Susan Harris
- Starring: Bruce Weitz; Nancy Walker; Susan Blakely; Dan Hedaya
- Country of origin: United States
- Original language: English
- No. of seasons: 1
- No. of episodes: 7 (1 unaired)

Production
- Camera setup: Multi-camera
- Running time: 30 minutes
- Production company: Witt/Thomas/Harris Productions

Original release
- Network: NBC
- Release: September 19, 1987 – August 6, 1988

Mama's Boy is an American sitcom television series that aired from September 19, 1987, until August 6, 1988. It was created by Susan Harris, and produced by Witt/Thomas/Harris Productions and it was distributed by TeleVentures. The comedy starred Bruce Weitz and Nancy Walker in the lead roles.

Mama's Boy was proposed as a new NBC project to debut as a series sometime during the 1987–88 season. When it debuted, it was described as a "designated hitter" -- "a show that will be broadcast monthly and then, ratings permitting, be ready to move into a weekly slot if required." However, after a couple of telecasts in the fall of 1987, the network continued to air the series' initial episodes sporadically (with as many as five months passing between episodes three and four) without a regular time slot. By the end of the season, NBC decided not to upgrade the show from "specials" status; only seven episodes were produced, with six airing through August 6, 1988. The last episode remains unaired.

== Premise ==
A newspaper columnist shares a New York apartment with his mother.

Weitz and Walker received this series in response to their recent popular NBC roles: his seven-year run as Det. Mick Belker on Hill Street Blues, and her two-time guest role as Angela, sister of Sophia Petrillo (Estelle Getty) on The Golden Girls. Additionally, Dan Hedaya, whose high-profile NBC guest role was as Nick Tortelli on Cheers, was added to the cast of this proposed series soon after the cancellation of his short-lived Cheers spin-off, The Tortellis.

== Cast ==
- Bruce Weitz as Jake McCaskey
- Nancy Walker as Molly McCaskey
- Susan Blakely as Victoria
- Dan Hedaya as Mickey

== Episodes ==
No.	Title	Directed by	Written by	Original release date
1	"Bachelor of the Year"	J.D. Lobue	Don Reo	September 19, 1987
Jake gets nominated for Bachelor of the Year by Manhattan Magazine. Ranked fourth in United States Nielsen ratings for the week (20.6, 18.3 million homes), helped by following The Golden Girls.
2	"Molly's Night Out"	Unknown	Unknown	October 31, 1987
Jake fixes Molly up with a millionaire.
3	"Pilot"	Greg Antonacci	Bill Levinson	November 26, 1987
Jake's mom, Molly, moves temporarily into Jake's apartment as she tries to get her financial situation sorted out, and wreaks havoc on Jake's personal life.
4	"Mickey's Song"	Unknown	Unknown	April 9, 1988
When Jake's cop buddy is shot, he recuperates at the McCaskeys' apartment.
5	"Remembrance of Things Past"	Unknown	Bob Schiller and Bob Weiskopf	June 29, 1988
Jake thinks about getting married when he meets a former girlfriend.
6	"Hamlet"	Unknown	Unknown	August 6, 1988
7	"Scared Straight"	TBD	TBD	UNAIRED
