= Charlotte Ross =

American actress (born 1968)

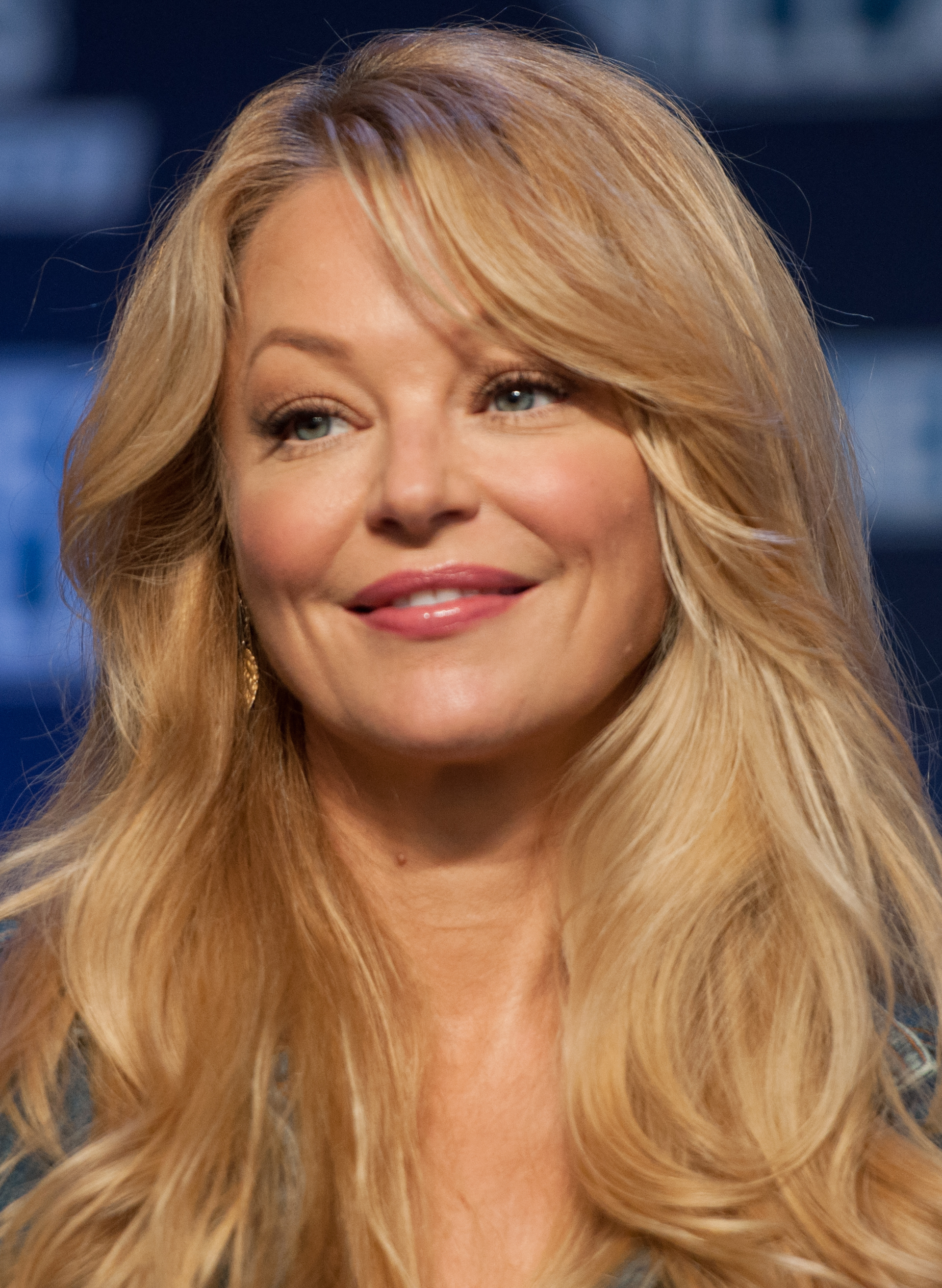
- Ross in August 2016
- Born: January 21, 1968 (age 58); Winnetka, Illinois, U.S.
- Education: New Trier High School
- Occupation: Actress
- Years active: 1986–present
- Spouse: Michael Goldman (m. 2003; div. 2008)
- Children: 1
- Website: CharlotteRoss.com

Charlotte Ross (born January 21, 1968) is an American actress. She is best known for her roles as Eve Donovan on the NBC soap opera Days of Our Lives from 1987 to 1991, and as Detective Connie McDowell on the ABC police procedural drama series NYPD Blue from 2001 to 2004.

== Early life ==
Ross was born in the Chicago suburb of Winnetka, Illinois, on January 21, 1968, and grew up there. Her parents are Debbie Ross Kullby, and Peter Ross (died 2009), who was a financial advisor.

== Career ==
After graduating from New Trier High School, Ross moved to Los Angeles, which her father opposed.

Ross's run on Days of Our Lives lasted from 1987 to 1991, earning her two Emmy Award nominations. Her other television credits include the musical drama series The Heights (where she sang on the Billboard Number One hit "How Do You Talk to an Angel"), The 5 Mrs. Buchanans, Drexell's Class, Pauly, Law & Order, Trinity, Beggars and Choosers, Frasier, Savage Land, Jake in Progress, Fall Into Darkness, and A Kiss So Deadly (which reunited with her Days co-star Charles Shaughnessy). She also co-starred in the Lifetime original films Montana Sky and Christmas in Paradise (both 2007). She earned a Gold record in 1992 for her work as a singer on the soundtrack album to The Heights.

Ross also played Connie McDowell in the ABC police procedural drama series NYPD Blue from 2001 to 2004. On February 25, 2003, Ross appeared in an NYPD Blue episode entitled "Nude Awakening", which featured shots of her buttocks as she prepared to step into the shower.

In 2006, Ross joined Billy Blanks to co-host a series of Tae-Bo infomercials. In 2011, Ross appeared as Candy in Summit's 3D film Drive Angry, alongside Nicolas Cage and Amber Heard. From 2009 to 2012, Ross began a recurring role on the Fox comedy-drama series Glee as Judy Fabray, the mother of Quinn Fabray (Dianna Agron). She appeared in four episodes. In 2013, Ross began starring in the VH1 sports drama series Hit the Floor. In 2014, Ross passed on an offer to return to Days of Our Lives as Eve Donovan, and her role was recast with Kassie DePaiva because she was too busy with other acting projects. Ross made a guest appearance in the ABC musical drama series Nashville. Later in the same year, she was cast as Felicity Smoak's mother in The CW superhero series, Arrow.

== Personal life ==
Ross married Michael Goldman in 2003, and they have a son. The couple separated in 2008. Ross currently resides in Los Angeles.

=== Activism ===
In 2002, Ross supported PETA's anti-fur campaign by appearing naked in advertisements captioned "I'd Rather Show My Buns Than Wear Fur".

In 2014, Ross signaled her support to the Animal Legal Defense Fund campaign "National Justice for Animals Week" by filming a video.

== Filmography ==
=== Film ===
Year	Title	Role	Notes	Ref.
1986	Touch and Go	Courtney's Girlfriend		
1994	Foreign Student	Elizabeth 'Sue Ann' Baldridge		
1994	Love and a .45	Mary Ann		
1994	Savage Land	Mandy		
1998	Looking for Lola	Debbie		
2007	Moola	Nora		
2007	Live!	Jennifer		
2011	Drive Angry	Candy		
2011	Street Kings 2: Motor City	Beth Kingston	Direct-to-video	
2011	The Umpire	Billie Satriano	Short film	
2014	Rita Mahtoubian is Not a Terrorist	Lana	Short film	

=== Television ===
Year	Title	Role	Notes	Ref.
1987–1991	Days of Our Lives	Eve Baron Donovan	Series regular; role from July 16, 1987, to July 12, 1991; Nominated – Daytime Emmy Award for Outstanding Younger Actress in a Drama Series (1990–1991)	
1991	She Says She's Innocent aka Violation of Trust	Justine Essex	Television film	
1991	Reasonable Doubts	Meredith Little	Episode: "Dicky's Got the Blues"	
1992	Empty Nest	Antoinette	Episode: "Sayonara"	
1992	Drexell's Class	Janet	Episode: "The Resentments"	
1992	Married... with Children	Darlene	Episode: "Teacher Pets"	
1992	The Heights	Hope Linden	Series regular; 13 episodes	
1994	Birdland	Ronnie	Episode: "Crazy for You"	
1994–1995	The 5 Mrs. Buchanans	Bree Buchanan	Series regular; 17 episodes	
1995–1996	Murder One	Stephanie Lambert	Episodes: "Chapter Eight" and "Chapter Seventeen"	
1996	ER	Angel	Episode: "The Right Thing"	
1996	Minor Adjustments	Amy	Episode: "Baba-Doo-Wang"	
1996	A Kiss So Deadly	Amanda Blake	Television film	
1996	Fall into Darkness	Ann Price	Television film	
1997	Pauly	Dawn Delaney	Series regular; 7 episodes	
1998	A Will of their Own	Susan Peterson	TV miniseries	
1998	Trinity	Fiona McCallister	Series regular; 10 episodes	
1998	NYPD Blue	Laurie Richardson	Episodes: "The One That Got Away" and "I Don't Wanna Dye"	
1999	Kidnapped in Paradise	Megan Emerson	Television film	
1999–2001	Beggars and Choosers	Lori Volpone	Series regular; 42 episodes	
2001	Frasier	Monica	Episode: "Sliding Frasiers"	
2001–2004	NYPD Blue	Det. Connie McDowell	Series regular; 70 episodes	
2006	Jake in Progress	Annie	3 episodes	
2007	Law & Order	Judith Barlow	Episode: "Talking Points"	
2007	Montana Sky	Tess Mercy	Television film (Lifetime)	
2007	Christmas in Paradise	Dana Marino	Television film (Lifetime)	
2008	Ring of Death	Mary Wyatt	Television film (Spike)	
2009	CSI: Crime Scene Investigation	Sabrina Owen	Episode: "If I Had a Hammer..."	
2009–2012	Glee	Judy Fabray	4 episodes	
2013	Hit the Floor	Olivia Vincent	Series regular (season 1)	
2014	Nashville	Ruth Bennett	Episode: "Guilty Street"	
2014–2017	Arrow	Donna Smoak	Recurring role (seasons 3–4 & 6); 12 episodes	
2026	Wonder Man	Bridget	Episode: "Doorman"	
