= Sons and Daughters (1991 TV series) =

- Genre: Comedy drama
- Created by: Brad Buckner; Eugenie Ross-Leming
- Starring: Lucie Arnaz; Michelle Wong; Rick Rossovich; Peggy Smithhart; Paul Scherrer; Kamaron Harper; Billy O'Sullivan; Scott Plank; Stacy Edwards; George D. Wallace; Aaron Brownstein; Lisa Blount; Don Murray
- Composer: Steve Dorff
- Country of origin: United States
- Original language: English
- No. of seasons: 1
- No. of episodes: 13 (6 unaired) (list of episodes)

Production
- Executive producers: Brad Buckner; Eugenie Ross-Leming
- Running time: 60 minutes
- Production companies: B&E Productions; Paramount Television

Original release
- Network: CBS
- Release: January 4 – March 1, 1991

Sons and Daughters is an American comedy-drama television series created by Brad Buckner and Eugenie Ross-Leming, that aired on CBS from January 4 until March 1, 1991.

It was originally to premiere on October 25, 1990, but it was shelved at the last minute.

== Premise ==
A single mother raises her adoptive daughter while trying to maintain harmony among other family members.

== Cast ==
- Lucie Arnaz as Tess Hammersmith, Bing's first daughter
- Michelle Wong as Astrid Hammersmith, Tess's adoptive daughter
- Rick Rossovich as Spud Lincoln, Patty's husband
- Peggy Smithhart as Patty Hammersmith Lincoln, Bing's second daughter
- Paul Scherrer as Rocky Lincoln, Spud & Patty's first son
- Kamaron Harper as Paulette Lincoln, Spud & Patty's daughter
- Billy O'Sullivan as Ike Lincoln, Spud & Patty's second son
- Scott Plank as Gary Hammersmith, Bing's son
- Stacy Edwards as Lindy Hammersmith, Gary's wife
- George D. Wallace as Hank Hammersmith, Bing's widowed father
- Aaron Brownstein as Bing Hammersmith Jr., Bing & Mary Ruth's son
- Lisa Blount as Mary Ruth Hammersmith, Bing's 2nd wife
- Don Murray as Bing Hammersmith Sr.

== Episodes ==
No.	Title	Directed by	Written by	Original release date
1	"Where's Poppa?"	David Carson	Brad Buckner and Eugenie Ross-Leming	January 4, 1991
The father of Tess Hammersmith returns to town with a young wife and a son.
2	"All Together Now"	Bill Bixby	Ronald Rubin	January 11, 1991
The appearance of Astrid's birth mother upsets Tess; and Lindy suffers from postpartum sexual dysfunction.
3	"The Thing"	Betty Thomas	Brad Buckner and Eugenie Ross-Leming	January 18, 1991
Tess and Mary Ruth has a disagreement over a marble tub. Bing and Gary go on a camping trip.
4	"The Dating Games"	Unknown	Unknown	January 25, 1991
Tess goes back into the dating scene. Paulette auditions for a part in the school play.
5	"Melanie"	Bill Bixby	Kathryn Baker	February 8, 1991
Rocky and his twenty-something supervisor at his part-time job (Lisa Pelikan) fall for each other; a stray dog Astrid has adopted wreaks household havoc; Grandpa babysits. Stephen Root guest stars.
6	"Thanks"	Unknown	Unknown	February 15, 1991
Guest stars include Eli Rich, Todd Susman and Justin Shenkarow.
7	"Sniffles"	Peter Levin	Brad Buckner and Eugenie Ross-Leming	March 1, 1991
Mary Ruth and Bing visit a fertility clinic; Ike and Spud both go to get their tonsils removed; Lindy's neurotic mother wants to move in. Guest stars include Norma Maldonado, Marj Dusay, Scott Bryce and Kathleen Freeman.
8	"Young Winston"	Nick Havinga	Jim Wells	UNAIRED
Ike has an imaginary friend. Gary gambles on a "sure" investment. Mary Ruth makes a gourmet dinner for Bing's friends. Guest stars include Patricia Barry, David Belafonte, Daniel Bardol and Lane Davies.
9	"Throw Momma from the Terrain"	King Baggot	E. Jack Kaplan	UNAIRED
Bing's first wife, who'd abandoned the family 23 years before, shows up unexpectedly; Lindy takes her breastfeeding fight public. Beverly Garland and Dori Brenner guest star.
10	"Crime and Punishment"	TBD	TBD	UNAIRED
Astrid's birth mother shows up.
11	"Deep Throat"	Peter Levin	Brad Buckner and Eugenie Ross-Leming	UNAIRED
Lindy's mother moves in. Bing and Mary Ruth discuss having another baby.
12	"Telling Secrets"	TBD	TBD	UNAIRED
David Sederholm and Amy Stoch guest star.
13	"Nose to Nose"	TBD	TBD	UNAIRED
Kevin Kilner, Ann Ryerson, Tiffanie Poston, and Andrew Hill Newman guest star
