= Edan Gross =

American businessman and actor

- Born: October 10, 1978 (age 47); United States
- Other name: Edon Gross
- Occupations: Businessman, actor
- Years active: 1985–1999

Edan Gross (born Edan-Shalom Gross, October 10, 1978) is an American businessman and former child actor. His first name is pronounced "EE-don", and is Hebrew for "Eden", or "paradise" or "place of pleasure".

== Career ==
Edan's first role was on the spin-off MASH series Trapper John, M.D., as Joshua Gordon in episode S06E16 Bad Breaks (aired Feb 24, 1985).

He appeared in many guest spots on television programs in the 1980s and 1990s including Cheers, Murphy Brown, The Golden Girls, Empty Nest, Newhart, Highway to Heaven, Married... with Children, Northern Exposure, and Herman's Head. He was also featured as a regular on the short-lived sitcoms Sweet Surrender (NBC, 1987), Free Spirit (ABC, 1989–1990) and Walter & Emily (NBC, 1991–1992). Additionally, Gross was the voice of the Good Guy dolls in Child's Play, the "Corky doll" from the Cricket doll series, the title character of the animated series Little Dracula, Flounder in the animated series The Little Mermaid and Waif in the computer game Return to Zork.

He also voiced Tyrone Turtle in Tiny Toon Adventures, Christopher Robin in the Christmas special Winnie the Pooh and Christmas Too, Merton in the ABC Weekend Special Runaway Ralph, Bitsy in the Yogi Bear special Yogi's Great Escape and voiced various characters in The Ren & Stimpy Show, TaleSpin, Pound Puppies, ProStars, Timeless Tales from Hallmark, Superman and Wally on the television special The Halloween Tree. Additionally, he was an uncredited actor in the horror-thriller movie, Mikey (film) as "Rest of cast listed alphabetically; Classroom Kid (uncredited)"

He was the president of 3TAC Distribution, Inc. from December 17, 2013, until its dissolution on April 1, 2016.

Since 2017, Edan has built a successful, long-term career as a commercial real estate broker based in Los Angeles.

== Filmography ==
=== Live-action ===
- ABC Weekend Specials - Merton
- Cheers - Child #2
- Daddy - Matty Burnette
- Murphy Brown - Joey
- Acceptable Risks - Jake Snyder
- The Golden Girls - The Boy
- Empty Nest - Jeffrey Millstein
- Newhart - Little Boy
- Highway to Heaven - Kid #2
- Married... with Children - Young Al Bundy, Carl
- Northern Exposure - Brad Young, "Survival of the Species" (4-11, January 4, 1993)
- Best of the Best - Walter Grady
- Best of the Best II - Walter Grady
- Herman's Head - Little Herman
- Trapper John, M.D. - Joshua Gordon
- Superboy - Young Clark
- Walter & Emily - Hartley
- Child's Play - Friendly Chucky / Kid in Animated Commercial / Oscar Doll
- Child's Play 2 - Tommy Doll
- Child's Play 3 - Good Guy Doll / Larry Doll / Pauly Doll
- Webster - Sherman Berman
- Sweet Surrender - Bart Holden
- The Tracey Ullman Show - David Havershim
- The Twilight Zone - Boy
- Mikey - Classroom Kid
- And You Thought Your Parents Were Weird - Max Carson
- Lisa - Ralph
- Renegade - Kenny
- We'll Take Manhattan - Rocky
- Free Spirit - Gene Harper

=== Animation ===
- Tiny Toon Adventures - Tyrone Turtle
- Winnie the Pooh and Christmas Too - Christopher Robin
- The Little Mermaid - Flounder
- The Ren & Stimpy Show - Additional voices
- TaleSpin - Bobbo
- Little Dracula - Little Dracula
- ProStars - Additional voices
- Pound Puppies - Jerry
- Foofur - Additional voices
- Superman - Scout Kid
- The Legend of Prince Valiant - Brother Paul, Young Arthur, Boy
- The Karate Kid - Additional voices
- Timeless Tales from Hallmark - Additional voices
- The Halloween Tree - Tom Skelton
- Yogi's Great Escape - Bitsy

=== Video games ===
- Return to Zork - Waif
