= Fall into Darkness =

1996 television movie directed by Mark Sobel

- Genre: Thriller
- Based on: Fall into Darkness by Christopher Pike
- Written by: J.B. White
- Directed by: Mark Sobel
- Starring: Tatyana M. Ali; Jonathan Brandis; Charlotte Ross; Sean Murray; Paul Scherrer
- Theme music composer: John D'Andrea; Cory Lerios; Matthias Weber
- Country of origin: United States
- Original language: English

Production
- Executive producer: Kenneth Kaufman
- Producers: Harriet Brown; Stephanie Hagen
- Cinematography: Miklós Lente
- Editor: Jonathon Braun
- Running time: 88 min.
- Production companies: Christopher Pike Productions; Patchett Kaufman Entertainment

Original release
- Network: NBC
- Release: November 25, 1996

Fall into Darkness is a 1996 television movie based on the young adult novel by Christopher Pike, who also executive-produced. The film stars Tatyana M. Ali, Jonathan Brandis, Charlotte Ross, and Sean Murray. It originally aired on NBC on November 25, 1996.

== Plot ==
Sharon McKay (Tatyana M. Ali) meets Jerry (Sean Murray) and his sister Ann Price (Charlotte Ross). After Sharon turns down Jerry, he falls into a state of depression, gets drunk, and wanders onto some train tracks and is killed. Ann believes Sharon is responsible for Jerry's death. Ann decides to frame Sharon for her (Ann's) murder with the help of her friend Paul. Things go as planned on the hiking trip that Sharon, Ann and several of their friends attend, as Sharon then is accused of Ann's murder, but Ann never resurfaces and it seems nothing is as it appears to be.

== Cast ==
- Tatyana M. Ali as Sharon McKay
- Charlotte Ross as Ann Price
- Jonathan Brandis as Chad Lear
- Paul Scherrer as Paul Lear
- Sean Murray as Jerry Price
- Alan Morgan as Mr. Renquist
- Jason Nash as Evan Clark
- Danielle Nicolet as Tracey
- Benjamin Ratner as John Richmond
- Marco Sanchez as Nico
- Ted Bradford as Minister

== DVD release ==
Fall into Darkness was released on all-region DVD on October 22, 2001.
