= This World, Then the Fireworks =

- Theatrical release poster
- Directed by: Michael Oblowitz
- Screenplay by: Larry Gross
- Based on: "This World, Then the Fireworks" by Jim Thompson
- Produced by: Larry Gross; Chris Hanley; Brad Wyman
- Starring: Billy Zane; Gina Gershon; Sheryl Lee; Rue McClanahan
- Cinematography: Tom Priestley Jr.
- Edited by: Emma E. Hickox
- Music by: Pete Rugolo
- Production companies: Balzac's Shirt; JVC Entertainment Networks; Largo Entertainment; Muse Productions; Wynard
- Distributed by: Largo Entertainment; Orion Pictures
- Release date: July 11, 1997
- Running time: 100 minutes
- Country: United States
- Language: English
- Box office: $51,618

This World, Then the Fireworks is a 1997 American crime drama film directed by Michael Oblowitz and starring Billy Zane, Gina Gershon, and Sheryl Lee. The screenplay is based on a short story of the same name by Jim Thompson.

== Plot ==
As children, Marty and Carol Lakewood, fraternal twins, witness a brutal murder involving their father. They grow up to become depraved and incestuous adults, living in coastal California in the mid-1950s.

Marty is a skillful journalist, but grows bored with every new job and is easily distracted. When he seduces a young police officer, Lois Archer, and discovers she owns a beach house, Marty sets out to double-cross her and make the property his own.

Carol is a heartless prostitute, willing to go to any lengths to con men out of their money, or make them pay in other ways. Powerless to stop them is Mrs. Lakewood, a weak-willed woman who suspects the terrible truth in her children's relationship, but knows no way to stop it.

== Cast ==
- Billy Zane as Marty Lakewood
  - Christopher Jones as Young Marty
    - Christian Durango as Little Marty
- Gina Gershon as Carol Lakewood Morgan
  - Megan Leigh Brown as Young Carol
    - Sloan Cobb as Little Carol
- Sheryl Lee as Lois Archer
- Rue McClanahan as Mrs. Lakewood
  - Roberta Hanley as Young Mrs. Lakewood
- Seymour Cassel as Detective Harris
- Will Patton as Lieutenant Morgan
- Richard Edson as Joe
- Tom Keeley as Lyle
- William Hootkins as Jake Krutz
- Philip Loch as Marty Lakewood's Father
- Elis Imboden as neighbor's Wife
- Mark Jeffrey Miller as Lloyd
- Marianna Alacchi as Glenda
- Robert Pentz as Lou
- Orson Oblowitz as Eugene
- Thad Mace as Tim
- Jonathan Taylor Luthren as Ben
- Stephanie Fisher as Claire
- Lou Criscuolo as McCloud
- Jeffrey Pillars as Galloway
- John Bennes as Griffith
- Barry Bell as Barnett Gibons
- David Lenthall as Doctor
- Terry Nienhuis as Minister
- Valentin de Vargas as Mexican Doctor
- Dean Mumford as Marine
- Willy Cobbs as Blues Musician
- Brian Keith Gamble as Spindly Man
- Mert Hatfield as Bus Driver
- Matt O'Toole as Thug 1
- Norman Max Maxwell as Thug 2

== Release ==
This World, Then the Fireworks was released on July 11, 1997 in only five U.S. theaters, grossing US$51,618 in total. It was released on videocassette on June 30, 1998, and on Blu-ray (through Kino Lorber) on November 14, 2017.

== Reception ==
On review aggregator website Rotten Tomatoes, the film has a 38% approval rating based on 8 reviews, with an average ranking of 3.9/10.

Emanuel Levy of Variety wrote "In the hands of filmmaker Michael Oblowitz, novelist Jim Thompson's story This World, Then the Fireworks gets an elegantly stylish, highly erotic, intentionally over-the-top rendition". Total Film called the film "sexy, stylized, deliberately overheated slice of noir".

== See also ==
- List of American films of 1997
