= Critical Care (Star Trek: Voyager) =

- Star Trek: Voyager episode
- Episode no.: Season 7 Episode 5
- Directed by: Terry Windell
- Story by: Robert Doherty; Kenneth Biller
- Teleplay by: James Kahn
- Production code: 250
- Original air date: November 1, 2000

Guest appearances
- John Kassir – Gar; Dublin James – Tebbis; Larry Drake – Administrator Chellick; Gregory Itzin – Dr. Dysek; Paul Scherrer – Voje; John Franklin – Kipp; Brooks Bonstin – Miner; Christina Chauncey – Level Blue Nurse; John Durbin – Alien Miner; Debi A. Monahan – Gar's Companion; Jim O'Heir – Husband; Stephen O'Mahoney – Med Tech; William Daniels – Hospital Ship Allocation Alpha (voice)

Episode chronology
← Previous "Repression"	Next → "Inside Man"
- Star Trek: Voyager season 7

"Critical Care" is the 151st episode of Star Trek: Voyager, and the fifth episode of its seventh season.

This episode focuses on the plight of the EMH, who has been stolen and is forced to work at an alien hospital. While working there it is confronted with various medical ethics questions he must overcome.

It originally aired on November 1, 2000 on UPN.

== Plot ==
The Doctor's mobile emitter is stolen from Voyager by an alien trader named Gar and sold to an overcrowded hospital run by the hardnosed Administrator Chellick. When the Doctor is activated and told to get to work on the patients of overcrowded and underequipped level "Red", he protests his kidnapping, but must comply due to his Hippocratic Oath.

The Doctor quickly learns that this hospital is run in a strict manner by a computer called the Allocator, which regulates doses of medicine to patients based on a Treatment Coefficient (TC) value assigned each patient. He is told that TC is based on a complex formula that reflects the patient's perceived value to society, rather than medical need. One patient, Tebbis, has a terminal condition that requires a drug the hospital can provide, but Tebbis's TC is too low to warrant it. When the Doctor begins to question the system, the Allocator assigns him to level "Blue." Level Blue's facilities and quality of care are dramatically better and more modern than Red's. He learns the patients on this level have a much higher TC than those where Tebbis is warded, and that the Allocator prioritizes their prophylactic care over those lower-TC patients who need emergency care. The Doctor is able to convince the nurses to provide him with extra doses of medicine, which he smuggles to the lower level and administers to Tebbis and others. Chellick discovers his scheme and forcibly restricts the Doctor to Level Blue.

Meanwhile, the Voyager crew tracks down Gar, who had stolen the Doctor's program, and Neelix tricks him into revealing the place where he sold the Doctor. Voyager sets course there.

The Doctor learns that Tebbis has died despite the fact that continued injections would have saved him. He figures out a means to escape Level Blue to continue to try to save the other patients in the lower levels. Chellick learns of this and arrives to stop the Doctor, but the Doctor injects him with some of Tebbis's blood, infecting him with the same condition. Mistaking him for the late Tebbis, The Allocator assigns Chellick a low TC, preventing him from getting the proper treatment. With this leverage, the Doctor convinces Chellick to move the low-TC patients, including himself, to level Blue to receive care. Voyager arrives to rescue the Doctor as Chellick's orders are carried out. Back aboard ship, the Doctor considers if his ethics subroutines have failed as he willingly infected Chellick, but Seven of Nine assures him that they did not, which means he acted entirely of his own accord.

== Academic response ==
In Teaching Medicine and Medical Ethics Using Popular Culture this episode was suggested as part of curriculum to teach medical ethics. They note the episode touches upon the concepts of justice, beneficence, and the allocation of medical resources.

== Home media releases ==
On December 21, 2003, this episode was released on DVD as part of a Season 7 boxset; Star Trek Voyager: Complete Seventh Season.

== See also ==
- Artificial intelligence in healthcare
- Health equity
- Social determinants of health
