= Lost on Earth =

- Genre: Science fiction Sitcom
- Created by: Doug Lawrence; Sy Rosen; Ackbaar Goulding
- Starring: Tim Conlon; Paul Gleason; Stacy Galina
- Composer: Jim Latham
- Country of origin: United States
- Original language: English
- No. of seasons: 1
- No. of episodes: 13

Production
- Executive producers: David Steinberg; David Salzman; Quincy Jones
- Running time: 30 minutes
- Production companies: Home by Six Productions; Quincy Jones/David Salzman Entertainment

Original release
- Network: USA Network
- Release: January 4 – April 2, 1997

Lost on Earth is an American sitcom starring Tim Conlon. The series premiered January 4, 1997 on the USA Network. It centers on a group of aliens who took the form of puppets after catching broadcasts of The Muppet Show and a reporter who's forced to work with them on a TV series.

== Plot ==
KTEE-TV television reporter David Rudy (Tim Conlon) has just suffered an on-air gaffe that could cost him his job. Rather than be fired, Rudy accepts a demotion from his boss, George Greckin (Paul Gleason), by agreeing to host a children's puppet show. Rudy quickly discovers that the puppets are not props, but are real aliens that became stranded on Earth while exploring the universe. Rudy is also dating the boss's daughter Sherry (Stacy Galina).

== Cast ==
- Tim Conlon as David Rudy, a mild-mannered reporter who grew up in an orphanage
- Stacy Galina as Sherry Greckin, David's girlfriend and the station's business manager
- Victor Togunde as Nick, a smart alec whom David befriended at the bar
- Paul Gleason as George Greckin, the blowhard station owner and Sherry's father

=== Aliens ===
- Terri Hardin/Kristin Charney as Angela, the only female of the group who's horny for David
- Kevin Carlson as Ahab, a gruff, armless weirdo who's quick with the quips
- Peter McCowatt/Greg Ballora as Philippe, the leader of the aliens
- Sandey Grinn as Bram, a sadsack who's in love with Angela
- Drew Massey as Reliegh, the most humanistic alien of the crew
- Carl J. Johnson as Cubby, a giant pig-like creature

== Episodes ==
No.	Title	Directed by	Written by	Original release date	Prod. code
1	"They're Alive"	Gary Brown	Sy Rosen & Ackbaar Goulding	January 4, 1997	9601
An embarrassing on-air incident causes David to get demoted from reporter to host of a puppet show. But when he discovers he's working with aliens who have taken the form of puppets, his show's an unexpected hit.
2	"In Arms Way"	Gary Brown	Story by : Larry Spencer & Vicki S. Horwits; Teleplay by : Larry Spencer	January 11, 1997	9602
George demands that David gets rid of armless Ahab, and when he doesn't do it, Ahab finds himself sitting in the local thrift store. Meanwhile, Dave decides to try out for an anchorman job.
3	"Commitment"	Paul Fusco	Phil Doran	January 18, 1997	9604
After David says, "I love you," Sherry freaks out, dumps him, and begins dating meathead anchorman Brad Shaw (John O'Hurley). Meanwhile, in a moment of vulnerability, Angela kisses Bram.
4	"Freedom"	Paul Fusco	Larry Spencer & Phil Doran	January 25, 1997	9605
The aliens get a chance to mingle at the TV station's costume party.
5	"Metamorphosis"	Gary Brown	Doug Chamberlin & Chris Webb	February 1, 1997	9603
In an effort to win David's affections, Angela makes herself up to look like Sherry. The plan backfires and gets David into trouble with both Sherry and the new sponsors.
6	"Acceptance"	Paul Fusco	Rick Rogers & Frank Santopadre	February 8, 1997	9606
The aliens have been stalking Seinfeld star Michael Richards, and in an attempt to cover, David blurts out that Richards is an old friend. Suddenly, George expects an exclusive interview.
7	"Nick Knows"	Peter Baldwin	TBD	unaired	9607
8	"Puppet Love"	Phil Ramuno	TBD	unaired	9608
9	"Guaranteed Not to Shrink"	Rick Locke	TBD	unaired	9609
10	"Father's Day"	Gary Brown	TBD	unaired	9610
11	"Where There's Smoke"	Gary Brown	TBD	unaired	9611
12	"Death of a Custodian"	Gary Brown	TBD	unaired	9612
13	"Going Home"	Paul Fusco	TBD	unaired	9613

== Reception ==
Steven Linan of the Los Angeles Times called the series "mirthless" and "a lost cause". Linan also stated that the show is "too silly for adults and too coarse for kids". John Levesque of the Seattle Post-Intelligencer did not find the series funny, and said that the scripts were "unimaginative" and "unprofessional". Claude Brooks of The Palm Beach Post said the series "isn't that bad", however "the puppets are funnier than the humans". Brooks referred to the series as essentially "3rd Rock from the Sun meets The Muppet Show".
