= We'll Take Manhattan (1990 film) =

- Written by: Tracy Gamble; Richard Vaczy
- Directed by: Andy Cadiff
- Starring: Jackée Harry; Corinne Bohrer; Edan Gross; Joel Brooks
- Country of origin: United States
- Original language: English

Production
- Executive producers: Paul Junger Witt; Tony Thomas
- Producers: Tracy Gamble; Richard Vaczy

Original release
- Release: June 16, 1990

We'll Take Manhattan is a 1990 American television pilot directed by Andy Cadiff and produced by Tony Thomas and Paul Junger Witt, who had had repeated success with other shows in the era. The series was not picked by the NBC network, though they opted to air the pilot episode.

The series was to star Jackée Harry, Corinne Bohrer, Edan Gross, Joel Brooks. It aired a single time on NBC as part of their Saturday night lineup on June 16, 1990.

Bohrer and Gross had just worked on the ABC sitcom Free Spirit together that had been canceled earlier in the 1989-1990 television season.

This series was the first attempt to create a starring vehicle for Harry, who had been best known for her role on NBC's 227. When this show did not get picked up, she would join the cast of The Royal Family following the death of Redd Foxx the following season.
