= Daddy's Girls (1994 TV series) =

- Genre: Sitcom
- Created by: Brenda Hampton; David Landsberg
- Starring: Dudley Moore; Harvey Fierstein; Stacy Galina; Meredith Scott Lynn; Keri Russell; Phil Buckman; Alan Ruck
- Composer: Nick South
- Country of origin: United States
- Original language: English
- No. of seasons: 1
- No. of episodes: 13 (10 unaired)

Production
- Executive producer: David Landsberg
- Running time: 30 minutes
- Production companies: Carydan Productions; Witt/Thomas Productions; Warner Bros. Television

Original release
- Network: CBS
- Release: September 21 – October 12, 1994

Daddy's Girls is an American television sitcom created by Brenda Hampton and David Landsberg that aired on CBS from September 21 to October 12, 1994.

== Overview ==
The series followed Dudley Walker (Dudley Moore), the owner of a New York fashion house who loses his wife and his business partner when, after a years-long secret affair, they run off together leaving him as the primary caretaker to his three daughters.

The series is notable as the first in which a gay principal character was played by an openly gay actor. Harvey Fierstein played Dennis Sinclair, a high-strung designer at Walker's firm.

The series was critically panned, and was placed "on hiatus" after only three episodes had aired.

This was Moore's penultimate on-screen job and his last regular television series. He later attributed his difficulties during the production of the show to the early stages of progressive supranuclear palsy, the disease that ultimately led to his death in 2002.

== Cast ==
- Dudley Moore as Dudley Walker
- Harvey Fierstein as Dennis Sinclair
- Stacy Galina as Amy Walker
- Meredith Scott Lynn as Samantha Walker
- Keri Russell as Phoebe Walker
- Phil Buckman as Scar
- Alan Ruck as Lenny

== Episodes ==
No.	Title	Directed by	Written by	Original release date	Prod. code
1	"Pilot"	Barnet Kellman	David Landsberg & Brenda Hampton	September 21, 1994	001
2	"American in Paris...Cool"	Greg Antonacci	Jack Amiel & Michael Begler	September 28, 1994	004
3	"Keep Your Business Out of My Business"	Unknown	Unknown	October 12, 1994	003
4	"Hit and Run"	TBD	TBD	Unaired	002
5	"Losin' It"	TBD	TBD	Unaired	005
6	"A Month of Sundays"	TBD	TBD	Unaired	006
7	"Triple Double"	TBD	TBD	Unaired	007
8	"Thank God It's Thursday"	TBD	TBD	Unaired	008
9	"Three Play"	TBD	TBD	Unaired	009
10	"Hard Sell"	TBD	TBD	Unaired	010
11	"The Honeymoon's Over"	TBD	TBD	Unaired	011
12	"Feed a Cold"	TBD	TBD	Unaired	012
13	"All in the Family"	TBD	TBD	Unaired	013

== Reception ==
Although Fierstein earned praise for his performance, Daddy's Girls was hated by critics. New York magazine called the series "Despised, reviled." Entertainment Weekly, somewhat prophetically, found Moore to be "wan and confused". The Dallas Morning News could only say that "Daddy's Girls isn't horrendously bad" but somewhat prophetically predicted that it would not last until Christmas.
