= The Van Dyke Show =

American sitcom

- Genre: Sitcom
- Created by: Donald Todd
- Written by: Sam Bobrick; Ron Clark; Neil Rosen; George Tricker
- Directed by: Zane Buzby; Jay Sandrich
- Starring: Dick Van Dyke; Barry Van Dyke; Kari Lizer; Maura Tierney; Billy O'Sullivan; Paul Scherrer; Whitman Mayo
- Composer: Stewart Levin
- Country of origin: United States
- Original language: English
- No. of seasons: 1
- No. of episodes: 10 (4 unaired)

Production
- Executive producers: Sam Bobrick; Ron Clark
- Producers: Walter Barnett; Jim Geoghan
- Camera setup: Multi-camera
- Running time: 30 minutes
- Production company: GTG Entertainment

Original release
- Network: CBS
- Release: October 26 – December 7, 1988

The Van Dyke Show is an American sitcom starring Dick Van Dyke and his son Barry Van Dyke, which aired on CBS from October 26 to December 7, 1988. The series marked the second time the real-life father-son actors worked together, after Dick guest-starred in a 4th-season episode of Airwolf with Barry as the leading man. It was Van Dyke's second return to series television since The New Dick Van Dyke Show ended in 1974.

== Synopsis ==
The series centers on Matt Burgess (Barry Van Dyke), who runs a small regional theater in Pennsylvania, and his father Dick Burgess (Dick Van Dyke), a Broadway musical star. Dick decided to give up Broadway to live and work with his son at the theater. The theater's staff included Doc, the stage manager; Jillian, Matt's secretary; and Eric, Matt's helper.

== Cast ==
- Dick Van Dyke as Dick Burgess
- Barry Van Dyke as Matt Burgess
- Kari Lizer as Chris Burgess
- Maura Tierney as Jillian Ryan
- Billy O'Sullivan as Noah Burgess
- Paul Scherrer as Eric Olander
- Whitman Mayo as Doc Sterling

=== Guest stars ===
- Lainie Kazan
- Lee Paul

== Reception and cancellation ==
The series was generally panned by critics and failed to generate sufficient ratings. CBS announced the series' cancellation on December 14, 1988, one week after the sixth episode aired. The remaining four episodes of the ten produced were never aired.

== Episodes ==
No.	Title	Directed by	Written by	Original release date	U.S. viewers (millions)
1	"Opening Night"	Unknown	Unknown	October 26, 1988	11.7
2	"Dick Stops Smoking"	Unknown	Unknown	November 2, 1988	10.4
3	"My Favorite Person"	Jay Sandrich	George Tricker & Neil Rosen	November 9, 1988	9.5
4	"Death Can Be Catching"	Unknown	Unknown	November 16, 1988	10.5
5	"Fatal Condo"	Frank Bonner	Stephen Langford	November 30, 1988	8.4
6	"The Benefit"	Unknown	Unknown	December 7, 1988	6.4
7	"The Revival"	N/A	N/A	Unaired	N/A
8	"A Dark and Stormy Night: Part 1"	N/A	N/A	Unaired	N/A
9	"A Dark and Stormy Night: Part 2"	N/A	N/A	Unaired	N/A
10	"Dick Burgess: Between the Sheets"	N/A	N/A	Unaired	N/A
