= Alright Already (TV series) =

- Genre: Sitcom
- Created by: Carol Leifer
- Starring: Carol Leifer; Amy Yasbeck; Stacy Galina; Mitzi McCall; Maury Sterling; Jerry Adler
- Composers: Johnathan Wolff; Paul Buckley
- Country of origin: United States
- Original language: English
- No. of seasons: 1
- No. of episodes: 21

Production
- Executive producers: Stephen Engel; Carol Leifer; Brad Grey
- Producer: Rob Schiller
- Camera setup: Multi-camera
- Running time: 30 minutes
- Production company: Brillstein-Grey Entertainment

Original release
- Network: The WB
- Release: September 7, 1997 – May 3, 1998

Alright Already is an American sitcom television series created and starring by Carol Leifer, that aired on The WB from September 7, 1997, to May 3, 1998.

== Premise ==
A single businesswoman opens an optometry shop in Miami with her best friend and deals with embarrassing situations and her relationship with her family.

== Cast ==
- Carol Leifer as Carol Lerner
- Amy Yasbeck as Renee
- Stacy Galina as Jessica Lerner
- Mitzi McCall as Miriam Lerner
- Maury Sterling as Vaughn Lerner
- Jerry Adler as Al Lerner

== Production ==
The series' original working title was Ocean Drive.

== Episodes ==
No.	Title	Directed by	Written by	Original release date	Prod. code	Viewers (millions)
1	"Again with the Baby"	Rob Schiller	Leslie Caveny	September 7, 1997	101	3.14
Carol lies about having a baby to make the neighbors turn down the volume of their music.
2	"Again with the Jury Duty"	Unknown	Carol Leifer	September 14, 1997	103	2.05
Carol tries to get out of jury duty so she can date a district attorney working on the case; Miriam and Al protest a traffic ticket.
3	"Again with the Black Box"	Rob Schiller	Carol Leifer	September 21, 1997	102	3.17
Carol buys a gag gift at a sex shop for Renee's snooty friend.
4	"Again with the Pilot"	Rob Schiller	Carol Leifer	September 28, 1997	100	2.94
Carol has an embarrassing predicament with toilet paper at a shopping centre.
5	"Again with the Laser Surgery"	Rob Schiller	Bill Kunstler	October 5, 1997	104	2.82
Carol and Renee get competitive when a store offering laser-eye-surgery opens next door; Vaughn pretends to be gay to attract a beautiful model.
6	"Again with the Mah-Jong"	Rob Schiller	Judy Toll and Susan Sherman	October 12, 1997	105	2.28
Carol cancels her bottled-water delivery when she finds out that the water is unclean; Miriam and Jessica have a tense mah-jong match.
7	"Again with the Lobbyist"	Rob Schiller	Chris Henchy and Chuck Martin	October 26, 1997	106	2.54
Carol tries to convince her parents to put her picture up on the wall.
8	"Again with the Porno Video"	Rob Schiller	Michael Rowe	November 2, 1997	107	2.24
Carol gets a porno video stuck in the VCR; Renee thinks the male star of the video looks like their overnight-delivery guy.
9	"Again with the Jessica's Boyfriend"	Rob Schiller	Dawn DeKeyser	November 9, 1997	108	2.88
Carol sets Jessica up on a date with a frame designer.
10	"Again with the Sponge Cake"	Unknown	Michael Rowe	November 16, 1997	109	2.76
Carol goes on a blind date; Miriam takes a driving lesson; Vaughn dates a dieter.
11	"Again with the Funeral"	Unknown	Judy Toll and Susan Sherman	November 23, 1997	110	3.09
Carol performs menial tasks for a widow; Jessica makes a sponge cake for the retirement community.
12	"Again with the Sexual Harassment"	Unknown	Carol Leifer	December 14, 1997	112	2.34
After pressure from her mom, Carol hires dimwitted cousin Gary to work at the shop.
13	"Again with the Billionaire"	Unknown	Stephen Engel and Carol Leifer	January 11, 1998	111	2.06
Carol dates a billionaire who constantly has her pay the bills.
14	"Again with the Satellite Dish"	Unknown	George McGrath	January 18, 1998	113	2.09
Carol impresses everybody with answers to Jeopardy!; Renee becomes director for the Lerners' condo's musical.
15	"Again with the Hockey Player (1)"	Unknown	Bill Kuntsler and Jim Wise	February 1, 1998	114	3.15
Carol is dating a man who tears off her clothes during moments of passion, costing her a new wardrobe. To be continued...
16	"Again with the Hockey Player (2)"	Unknown	Stephen Engel and Carol Leifer (teleplay) and Michael Gannon (story)	February 8, 1998	115	3.11
Carol is mortified when the hockey player she is dating reveals details about their sex life to millions of viewers.
17	"Again with the Astronaut"	Rob Schiller	Chuck Martin and Chris Henchy	February 15, 1998	117	2.43
Carol dates an astronaut and gives him a cold.
18	"Again with the Gynecologist"	Amanda Bearse	Kell Cahoon and Tom Saunders	February 22, 1998	118	3.31
Carol dates a gynecologist who isn't exactly what she expected him to be in bed.
19	"Again with the Answering Machine"	Unknown	Kell Cahoon and Tom Saunders	March 1, 1998	116	3.28
Carol tries to dump her boyfriend by leaving a message on his answering machine, but is constantly thwarted by call-forwarding.
20	"Again with the Photos"	Unknown	Judy Toll and Susan Sherman (teleplay) & Chris Henchy and Carol Leifer (story)	April 27, 1998	119	2.2
Carol goes back to her hockey-playing boyfriend.
21	"Again with the White House"	Gordon Hunt	Bill Kuntsler and Michael Rowe (teleplay) & Carol Leifer and Stephen Engel (story)	May 3, 1998	120	3.1
Two of Carol's former boyfriends invite her to the White House.
