= Heartland (1989 TV series) =

American sitcom

- Created by: Don Reo
- Starring: Brian Keith; Richard Gilliland; Katie Layman
- Opening theme: performed by Dion DiMucci
- Country of origin: United States
- Original language: English
- No. of seasons: 1
- No. of episodes: 10

Production
- Camera setup: Multi-camera
- Running time: 30 minutes
- Production companies: Impact Zone Productions; Witt/Thomas Productions

Original release
- Network: CBS
- Release: March 20 – June 12, 1989

Heartland is an American sitcom that aired on CBS from March 20, 1989, until June 12, 1989. The series stars Brian Keith as an old-fashioned Nebraska farmer who moves in with his daughter (Katie Layman), son-in-law (Richard Gilliland) and their family. Keith's real-life daughter Daisy Keith plays one of his grandchildren. The show was created by Don Reo, and was produced by Impact Zone Productions in association with Witt/Thomas Productions and distributed by TeleVentures.

== Premise ==
An old-fashioned farmer, B. L. McCutcheon, loses his farm and has to move in with his daughter's family in the fictional rural town of Pritchard, Nebraska.

== Cast ==
- Brian Keith as B.L. McCutcheon
- Richard Gilliland as Tom Stafford
- Katie Layman as Casey McCutcheon Stafford
- Jason Kristofer as Johnny Stafford
- Devin Ratray as Gus Stafford
- Daisy Keith as Kim Stafford

== Episodes ==
No.	Title	Directed by	Written by	Original release date	U.S. viewers (millions)	Rating/share (households)
1	"The Tornado"	Terry Hughes	Don Reo	March 20, 1989	17.9	12.4/19
The Staffords refuse an offer from an agribusiness representative. A tornado hits the farm.
2	"B.L. Moves Out"	Terry Hughes	Don Reo	March 27, 1989	13.2	9.6/15
B.L. and Tom have a fight and B.L. runs from the house. Johnny goes skinny-dipping.
3	"Johnny Goes to California"	Steve Zuckerman	Don Reo	April 3, 1989	11.8	8.6/13
Johnny plans a road trip to California.
4	"Gus Sees a Dead Guy"	Steve Zuckerman	Don Reo	April 10, 1989	13.3	9.5/15
Gus sees his first dead body at a funeral. Johnny doesn't trust Kim's new boyfriend.
5	"Girl Wrestler"	Andy Cadiff	Don Reo & Judith D. Allison	April 17, 1989	14.3	9.8/16
Gus quits the wrestling team when a girl joins the team.
6	"Life and Death"	Steve Zuckerman	Don Reo	April 24, 1989	11.8	8.2/14
Casey thinks she is pregnant. Johnny goes deer hunting.
7	"The Sky Is Falling"	Unknown	Unknown	May 1, 1989	13.9	10.1/16
One of the Staffords' sheep is killed when an airplane falls out of the sky.
8	"The Dog Story"	Zane Busby	Don Reo & Judith D. Allison	May 8, 1989	12.0	8.9/14
Johnny falls in love with a farmer's daughter.
9	"No Place Like Home"	Andy Cadiff	Julia Newton	May 22, 1989	12.2	9.0/16
Tom attends an auction. B.L. accompanies Kim on her trip to New York City to apply to Juilliard.
10	"The Wild One"	Unknown	Unknown	June 12, 1989	11.9	8.4/15
Tom and B.L. have to share a bed when they go for a trip to Kansas. Johnny buys an old motorbike.
