= Walter & Emily =

- Genre: Sitcom
- Created by: Paul Perlove
- Starring: Brian Keith; Cloris Leachman; Christopher McDonald; Matthew Lawrence; Edan Gross
- Theme music composer: Dave Koz; Jeff Koz; Audrey Koz (later theme)
- Opening theme: "It's Never Too Late for Love" performed by Dave Koz (later episodes)
- Composer: George Aliceson Tipton
- Country of origin: United States
- Original language: English
- No. of seasons: 1
- No. of episodes: 13

Production
- Executive producers: Paul Junger Witt; Tony Thomas; John Rich
- Producers: Ron Bloomberg; Gilbert Junger; Larry Levin; Bruce Ferber
- Camera setup: Multi-camera
- Running time: 30 minutes
- Production companies: Witt/Thomas Productions; Touchstone Television

Original release
- Network: NBC
- Release: November 16, 1991 – February 22, 1992

Walter & Emily is an American sitcom that aired on NBC from November 16, 1991, to February 22, 1992. The series was created by Paul Perlove, and produced by Witt/Thomas Productions in association with Touchstone Television.

== Plot ==
Retired salesman Walter Collins' son Matt, a divorced sportswriter, had custody of his 11-year-old son Zach on the condition that the boy's grandparents, Walter and his wife Emily, would be around to help raise him.

== Cast ==
- Brian Keith as Walter Collins
- Cloris Leachman as Emily Collins
- Christopher McDonald as Matt Collins
- Matthew Lawrence as Zach Collins
- Edan Gross as Hartley

== Episodes ==
No.	Title	Directed by	Written by	Original release date
1	"Big Trouble"	John Rich	Paul Perlove	November 16, 1991
2	"Take This Job..."	John Rich	Unknown	November 23, 1991
3	"Risks"	John Rich	Unknown	November 30, 1991
4	"Bedtime Story"	John Rich	Unknown	December 7, 1991
5	"Duck"	John Rich	Unknown	December 14, 1991
6	"The Perfect Woman"	John Rich	Unknown	December 21, 1991
7	"Aunt Julia"	John Rich	Unknown	January 4, 1992
8	"Exposed"	John Rich	Unknown	January 11, 1992
9	"Remember Me?"	John Rich	Unknown	January 25, 1992
10	"Labor Pain"	John Rich	Michael Langworthy	February 1, 1992
11	"Date Night"	John Rich	Unknown	February 8, 1992
12	"The Falcon and the Leg Man"	John Rich	Unknown	February 15, 1992
13	"Sis"	John Rich	Unknown	February 22, 1992

== Bibliography ==
- Tim Brooks and Earle Marsh, The Complete Directory to Prime Time Network and Cable TV Shows 1946–Present, Ninth edition (New York: Ballantine Books, 2007) ISBN 978-0-345-49773-4
