= Michael Genevie =

- Born: September 30, 1959 (age 66); West Virginia
- Education: Florida State University
- Known for: Serving as the Director of the Abbeville Opera House
- Spouse: Kathy Genevie

Michael Genevie (born September 30, 1959) is an American stage, film and television actor who was the Executive and Artistic Director of the Abbeville Opera House, the official drama state theatre of South Carolina, from 1979 to 2018.

Genevie was born and raised in West Virginia and graduated in 1976 from the Florida State University School of Theatre, where he earned an MFA in Directing. He began his professional acting and directing career immediately after an Internship at the renowned Actors Theatre of Louisville and has been the Director of the Abbeville Opera House for more than twenty five years.

Genevie has been seen in over 75 feature films, television series and movies of the week.

Under Genevie's direction, the Abbeville Opera House has twice received the South Carolina Governors Travel Award for Tourism. He is listed in the Abbeville County Hall of Fame for his many contributions to the revitalization of the community. The Abbeville Opera House opened its doors in October 1908.
