= Children of the Corn II: The Final Sacrifice =

1992 film by David Price

- Theatrical release poster
- Directed by: David Price
- Written by: A. L. Katz; Gilbert Adler
- Based on: Children of the Corn by Stephen King
- Produced by: Scott A. Stone; David G. Stanley
- Starring: Terence Knox; Paul Scherrer; Ryan Bollman; Christie Clark; Rosalind Allen; Ned Romero
- Cinematography: Levie Isaacks
- Edited by: Barry Zetlin
- Music by: Daniel Licht
- Production companies: Stone Stanley Entertainment; Corn Cob Productions
- Distributed by: Dimension Films; Miramax Films
- Release dates: May 1992 (Italy, France); October 21, 1992 (Germany); January 29, 1993 (U.S.)
- Running time: 93 minutes
- Country: United States
- Language: English
- Budget: $1.3 million
- Box office: $7 million (US)

Children of the Corn II: The Final Sacrifice is a 1992 American supernatural slasher film and the sequel to the 1984 film Children of the Corn. Directed by David Price (son of studio chief Frank Price), it stars Terence Knox, Ryan Bollman, Ned Romero, and Paul Scherrer. The film was released on October 21, 1992, in Germany and in theatres by Dimension Films on January 29, 1993. The video release was handled by Paramount Pictures. This was the last film in the series to be released theatrically until 2023, as other sequels went on direct to video.

== Plot ==
The plot involves the dark goings-on in Hemingford, Nebraska, a town near Gatlin, the original film's setting. Two days after the events of the first film, the people of Hemingford decide to adopt the surviving children from Gatlin and help them start new lives. The well-meaning locals are unaware that the children return to the cornfield where one of the cult members, Micah, is possessed by He Who Walks Behind the Rows, the demonic entity the cult worships.

Caught in the middle are city reporter John Garrett and his son Danny, who are having a huge fight over John's failed relationship with Danny's mother. John is in town working on a story about children to save his fading career. He encounters two of his former colleagues, Bobby Knite and fellow reporter Wayde McKenzie, who are leaving town. They later die in a nearby cornfield after taking a shortcut in their van; a mysterious and powerful storm that lasts only a few minutes causes the surprisingly sharp corn stalks to wreak havoc. Back in town, John meets a bed and breakfast owner, Angela Casual, and they soon become lovers. Trying to distance himself from his father, Danny befriends Lacey, a beautiful local orphan girl, who tells him some disturbing details about Gatlin.

Micah and the other children murder local woman Ruby Burke by sabotaging the hydraulic jacks supporting her house while she is underneath it, causing it to descend and crush her. Micah then kills another townsperson, David Simpson, during church services with a knife and a wooden voodoo doll, which causes him to bleed to death from his head and face. John starts to question the town doctor about what is going on, but the doctor acts suspiciously and asks John to leave. Afterwards, the doctor calls the sheriff and reports that John is investigating. The doctor is later stabbed to death in his office by the children. Micah and the children later kill Mrs. Burke's sister, Mrs. West, in the road and make it look like she was struck by a car.

John partners with Frank Red Bear, a Native American professor at the state university, trying to make sense of the recent chaos and death. Frank leads John to ancient Native American rock paintings, telling him that Native Americans believed the area around Gatlin and Hemingford to hold special power which can magnify good or bad, and that children are especially vulnerable: Frank recites a story which tells of children killing their elders, but also how in the end with a funeral pyre a good spirit will emerge, further stipulating that the rock paintings show this has not yet come to pass.

As they investigate the local corn storage, they discover that town residents have been selling spoiled corn from the previous year's harvest along with the new crop to maximize profits. Growing on the spoiled corn is a dark-green acidic toxin which they believe is filling the town's air and contributing to a state of delusions in the children, rendering them emotionless and violent. The Sheriff discovers them spying on the site, ties them up, and leaves them to be killed by a corn harvester, but they escape. Along the way, John questions Frank further about what's going on, with Frank telling how Native Americans believed in a spirit who would seek revenge for perceived wrongs done to the land, with He Who Walks Behind the Rows being this spirit.

The Sheriff and the rest of the Hemingford adults attend an emergency town-hall meeting to discuss the situation, but the children lock them inside and set the building afire, killing them all. The children then kidnap Angela and Lacey and take them out to the cornfield where they pressure a confused Danny to join them in sacrificing Lacey. John and Frank arrive driving the harvester. One of the children shoots Frank with an arrow, wounding him. Danny and John free Lacey and Angela and attempt to escape but the cornfield seems endless and they shortly return to where they started. Micah attempts to harness the power of He Who Walks Behind the Rows until Frank restarts the harvester, before he dies. Micah's robe gets caught in the machine. At that moment, Micah is freed from his possession and calls for help. Danny runs in to help him but is too late. The harvester pulls Micah in, killing him. The rest of the children scatter, and John, Danny, Angela, and Lacey leave the clearing.

John and Danny later reconcile as they burn Frank's body on traditional Native American funeral pyre, before they, Angela, and Lacey drive off together. Some time later, Frank is seen doing additions to the rock paintings to show that the story has come to pass, with his spirit having become the protector of the area.

== Cast ==
- Ryan Bollman as Micah
- Terence Knox as John Garrett
- Paul Scherrer as Danny Garrett
- Rosalind Allen as Angela Casual
- Christie Clark as Lacey Hellerstat
- Ned Romero as Dr. Frank Red Bear
- Ed Grady as Dr. Richard Appleby
- Sean Bridgers as Jedediah
- Aubrey Dollar as Naomi Johnson
- Wallace Merck as Sheriff Blaine
- Ted Travelstead as Mordechai

== Production ==
=== Development ===
Larry Kupin and Harry E. Sloan, both of whom had previously headed New World Pictures, took advantage of the company's uncertain financial future and acquired the rights to both Children of the Corn and Hellraiser for Trans-Atlantic Pictures with plans to exploit both properties with decreased risk to themselves by partnering with multiple production and distribution companies. A. L. Katz and Gilbert Adler were working on the TV series Freddy's Nightmares when they were approached to develop the script for the Children of the Corn sequel. David Price, who had previously directed Son of Darkness: To Die For II, was hesitant at first when approached to direct the film as he knew about Stephen King's vocal dislike of the first film. Price eventually garnered more enthusiasm after reading Katz and Adler's script, then under the title of Children of the Corn II: Deadly Harvest, feeling it opened up the world presented in the first film allowing for more characterization since the townspeople weren't all killed off at the beginning.

=== Filming ===
Film production began at the end of spring 1991, and shooting began on July 29, 1991, in Liberty, North Carolina. The shoot lasted just four weeks. Most of the cast were locals, including the children. The scene involving an elderly woman flying through a store window after her wheelchair becomes controlled by Micah was filmed in downtown Ramseur, North Carolina. The scene where Micah and the children of the corn burn the town elders was filmed in a home at the corner of Asheboro St. and Luther Ave. in Liberty. The home was burned for the film and a vacant lot remains where the house once stood. The production crew used a local parsonage at the corner of Fayetteville and Raleigh Sts. in Liberty as its headquarters during shooting. Brian Yuzna's son Xeno appears as one of the children of the corn.

In the DVD commentary, director David Price said during the shoot there was a local Christian group who held a few (low-key) protests during filming, and he received a dead rodent on his door step as a warning. As a result, the production constructed their own church for a few scenes in the film. Despite this, no actual incidents occurred.

Also in the DVD commentary, Price said the ending involving Red Bear painting a stone was added at the last minute. Originally, it involved John Garrett making a phone call to his tabloid at a phone booth by the side of the road near the cornfield, only to have it swallowed into the earth by He Who Walks Behind The Rows, killing him. This was scrapped due to budget constraints.

The film had a working title of Children of the Corn: The Awakening during early stages of production. The film was also screened in Italy in 1992 with the title Children of the Corn II: Deadly Harvest.

== Release ==
After Children of the Corn II wrapped back-to-back production with Hellraiser III: Hell on Earth the producers brought the films to Bob and Harvey Weinstein in 1991, who had recently rebranded their genre label, Millimeter Films, to Dimension Films with both films being the earliest releases from the label.

Children of the Corn II was originally scheduled to be released in the US on June 26, 1992, however its release date was postponed to October 2, 1992, and eventually postponed until January 1993 due to Miramax adding additional special effects to the movie.Children of the Corn II: The Final Sacrifice was released in theaters on January 29, 1993. It made $2.7 million in its opening weekend and eventually grossed a total of $6,980,986 in the US.

=== Home media ===
Children of the Corn II was released on VHS on September 15, 1993, by Paramount Home Video. The Canadian and European home video releases feature a slightly different musical score, and is missing the CGI sequence in the middle of the film.

== Reception ==
On the review aggregator website Rotten Tomatoes, Children of the Corn II holds a 20% approval rating based on 15 critic reviews, with an average rating of 4.1/10.

Joseph Ornelas of Collider described the film as "so-bad-it's-good", saying, "Whatever way you slice it, Children of the Corn II: The Final Sacrifice defies all logic and every rule of good storytelling, failing its way to the top to utterly delightful effect."

== See also ==
- Children of the Corn (film series)
- List of adaptations of works by Stephen King
