= Stacy Galina =

American jeweler and former actress (born 1966)

- Born: September 24, 1966 (age 59); Baltimore, Maryland, U.S
- Occupations: Actress, Jeweler
- Years active: 1989–2011 (actress)
- Children: 1

Stacy Galina (born September 24, 1966) is an American jeweler and former actress. She is known for her roles as Kate Whittaker and Mary-Frances Sumner in the CBS prime time soap opera Knots Landing.

== Early life ==
Galina was born in Baltimore, Maryland, and studied at the School of American Ballet and American Ballet Theatre in New York and danced for three years with the Atlanta Ballet. She is an only child. Galina's original dream career was to be a professional dancer, but a childhood injury at age seven led to her temporarily using a wheelchair and forced her to abandon such prospects.

== Career ==
Galina later began an acting career, making her screen debut in a small part in the 1989 comedy film Big Man on Campus. She later appeared in the David Jacobs' series Paradise, before winning a role on his Knots Landing. She first appeared in the series in a guest role, playing Mary Frances Sumner in 1990, before joining the regular cast as Kate Whittaker for the final three seasons of the show. She reprised the role of Kate for Knots Landing: Back to the Cul-de-Sac in 1997.

Galina had regular roles in a number of short-lived sitcoms, such as Daddy's Girls (CBS, 1994), Lost on Earth (USA Network, 1997), Alright Already (The WB, 1997–1998), and Hidden Hills (NBC, 2002–2003). Galina also guest starred on Party of Five, Friends, Will & Grace, Boston Legal, and had a recurring role on Providence. She also had the leading role in the 1998 direct-to-video horror film, Children of the Corn V: Fields of Terror as the final girl.

== Personal life ==
Galina retired from acting in 2011, citing a learning disability as her biggest reason, as she often had difficulty memorizing lines and keeping up with the cast. She instead pursued work as a full-time jeweler.

== Filmography ==
=== Film ===
| Year | Title | Role | Notes |
|---|---|---|---|
| 1989 | Big Man on Campus | Student | |
| 1998 | Children of the Corn V: Fields of Terror | Allison | Direct-to-video |

=== Television ===
| Year | Title | Role | Notes |
|---|---|---|---|
| 1989 | Mike Hammer: Murder Takes All | Amy Durant | Television film |
| 1990 | The Magical World of Disney | Jill | Episode: "Exile" |
| 1989–1990 | Paradise | Frankie | Episodes: "Crossroads", "Till Death Do Us Part" |
| 1990–1993 | Knots Landing | Kate Whittaker / Mary-Frances Sumner | Main role; 71 episodes |
| 1994 | Daddy's Girls | Amy | Main role; 3 episodes |
| 1995 | Party of Five | Maggie Beaton | Episode: "Analogies" |
| 1997 | Lost on Earth | Sherry Greckin | Main role; 7 episodes |
| 1997 | Knots Landing: Back to the Cul-de-Sac | Kate Whittaker | Miniseries |
| 1997–1998 | Alright Already | Jessica Lerner | Main role; 21 episodes |
| 1999 | It's Like, You Know... | Maggie | Episode: "Lost in America" |
| 2000 | Friends | Julie Graff | Episode: "The One with the Nap Partners" |
| 2002 | What I Like About You | Sheila | Episode: "The Parrot Trap" |
| 2001–2002 | Providence | Allison Hoffman | Recurring role, 5 episodes |
| 2003 | Untitled Howie Mandel Project | | TV pilot |
| 2002–2003 | Hidden Hills | Pam Asher | Main role; 18 episodes |
| 2004 | Will & Grace | Debbie | Episode: "Looking for Mr. Good Enough" |
| 2006 | Boston Legal | Jody Young | Episode: "Live Big" |
| 2007 | Notes from the Underbelly | Marie | Episode: "Keeping Up Appearances" |
| 2011 | Love Bites | Kindra | Episode: "Firsts" |
