= Paul Scherrer (actor) =

American actor

- Born: December 16, 1968 (age 57); Rochester, New York, U.S.
- Education: Loyola University Chicago
- Occupations: Former actor, realtor
- Years active: 1981–2001
- Children: 2

Paul Gallagher Scherrer (born December 16, 1968) is a realtor and former American stage, film and television actor. He began his career as a child actor on the stage. Scherrer retired from acting in 2001 and now lives and works in Indianapolis.

== Early life and career ==
Scherrer was born in Rochester, New York to Gay and Paul Scherrer and raised in Indianapolis. He began acting as a child and played Peter Cratchit in a musical production of A Christmas Carol. At 13, he earned an Encore Award for best performance by a child actor for his role in the musical, Camelot.

Scherrer attended North Central High School for two years where he played varsity baseball and graduated in 1987. Upon graduation, he enrolled at Loyola University Chicago. He dropped out after his freshman year to play Eric, the 16-year-old aspiring actor and janitor on the 1988 sitcom, The Van Dyke Show. The series was canceled later that same year. In 1989, he was cast as Robb Harper on the ABC sitcom Free Spirit. The series struggled in the ratings and was canceled by ABC in January 1990. The following year, he was cast in yet another short-lived series, Sons and Daughters, starring Lucie Arnaz.

In 1992, Scherrer co-starred in the horror film Children of the Corn II: The Final Sacrifice. That same year, he appeared in the ABC sitcom pilot Camp Bicknell. The project was subsequently retooled and it premiered on ABC that fall as Camp Wilder, but without Scherrer and other cast members from the original pilot. During this period, Scherrer had guest starring roles on Silk Stalkings, Quantum Leap, and Murder, She Wrote. In 1996, Scherrer had a supporting role in the NBC television movie Fall into Darkness starring Tatyana Ali and Jonathan Brandis. In 2000, he guest starred on Star Trek: Voyager in the seventh-season episode "Critical Care". His last acting role to date was in a 2001 episode of JAG.

Scherrer now owns United Real Estate, a real estate brokerage in Indianapolis, with his brother, Chris and is a member of Scherrer Bros, owned by his wife, Nicole and sister-in-law Valerie. Paul and Nicole have two children.

== Filmography ==
Film
Year	Title	Role	Notes
1992	Children of the Corn II: The Final Sacrifice	Danny Garrett	
1998	Standoff	Ranger Barry	
2000	Rocket's Red Glare	Eddie	

Television
Year	Title	Role	Notes
1988	The Van Dyke Show	Eric Olander	10 episodes
1989–1990	Free Spirit	Robb Harper	14 episodes
1990	Daughter of the Streets	Brett	Television movie
1990	Running Against Time	Chris Rhodes	Television movie
1991	Uncle Buck	Paul	Episode: "Pig-malion"
1991	Sons and Daughters	Rocky Lincoln	7 episodes
1991	Fire in the Dark	Eric	Television movie
1992	Honor Thy Mother	Neal	Television movie
1992–1994	Silk Stalkings	Various roles	2 episodes
1993	Quantum Leap	Jack	Episode: "Return of the Evil Leaper - October 8, 1956"
1993	Sworn to Vengeance		Television movie
1994	Search and Rescue		Television movie
1994	Murder, She Wrote	Ben Peterson	Episode: "An Egg to Die For"
1996	Widow's Kiss	Chuck Nyles	Television movie
1996	Fall into Darkness	Paul Lear	Television movie
1997	Promised Land	Joel Corwin	Episode: "Downsized"
1998	ER		Episode: "Sharp Relief"
2000	Star Trek: Voyager	Voje	Episode: "Critical Care"
2001	JAG	P.O. Ramsey Dill	Episode: "Jagathon"

== Award nomination ==
Year	Award	Category	Title of work
1990	Young Artist Award	Best Young Actor Supporting Role in a Television Series	Free Spirit
