= Ryan Bollman =

American television and film actor (born 1972)

- Born: Ryan Matthew Bollman; August 9, 1972 (age 54); St. Louis, Missouri, U.S.
- Occupation: Actor
- Years active: 1986–present
- Known for: Children of the Corn II: The Final Sacrifice; Only the Strong; The NeverEnding Story III
- Website: ryanbollman.com

Ryan Matthew Bollman (born August 9, 1972) is an American television and film actor best known for his roles in Children of the Corn II: The Final Sacrifice (1992), Only the Strong (1993), and The NeverEnding Story III (1994).

== Personal life ==
Bollman was born on August 9, 1972 in St. Louis, Missouri to Allan and Susanne Bollman. He grew up in Sappington and Belleville, Illinois.

== Career ==
In 1995, Bollman portrayed Buesher in the play The Conquest of the South Pole by Manfred Karge at the Lost Studio in Los Angeles. In 2006, he portrayed Ralph Malph in the musical Happy Days by Garry Marshall at the Falcon Theater.

== Filmography ==
Film
Year	Title	Role	Notes
1992	Children of the Corn II: The Final Sacrifice	Micah	
1993	Only the Strong	Donovan	
1994	The NeverEnding Story III	Dog	
1995	The Granny	Junior	
1996	True Blue	Morrison Black	
1998	Lured Innocence	Dewey	
1999	No Vacancy	Pete	
1999	Love Happens	Billy	
2000	Forever Lulu	Freddie	
2000	Dean Quixote	Harry	
2002	Hip, Edgy, Sexy, Cool	Actor in Audition	
2005	Black Dawn	Billy Raduziner	
2008	Patsy	Skip	
2008	Technique	Tommy	Short film
2009	The Closer	Steve	Short film
2009	Decomposing Tony Maslow	Phil, the agent	
2010	Kung Fu Magoo	Corporal Hayes	Voice
2013	Hour Friends	Rizzo	
2016	$elfie Shootout	Chub	
2016	Quality Problems	Lance	
2018	1 Interrogation	Lester Gage	
2025	Pilgrim	Derek	
TBA	A Corpse in Kensington †	Keir	

Key
†	Denotes films that have not yet been released

Television
Year	Title	Role	Notes
	D. B.'s Delight		Weekly regular
	Incredible Kids		
	Kidsworld		
	In Touch		
1982	Small World	Himself	TV Movie featuring Mariette Hartley
1986	Starman	Boy #2	Episode: "The Return"
1986	Kidsongs		Episode: "What I Want to Be"
1986	Throb	Small Change	Episode: "Tassles"
1986	Highway to Heaven	Chris	Episode: "For the Love of Larry"
1987	Kids Incorporated	Jason	Episode: "You've Got the Wrong Date"
1987	Punky Brewster	Robert	Episode: "My Fair Punky"
1987	Mama's Family	Eugene	Episode: "Child's Play"
1988	Small Wonder	Mark Gordon	Episode: "Ronald McDonald House"
1989–1991	Life Goes On	Lester Fitchman	4 episodes
1991	Renegade	Ted	Episode: "The Champ"
1993	At Home with the Webbers	Jimmy Nelson	TV Movie
1994	Thunder Alley	Instructor	Episode: "Get a Job"
1995	Family Matters	Gun Salesman	Episode: "The Gun"
1996	Relativity	Video Job	Episode: "Jake Gets a Job"
1996	Out of the Blue	Crankcase	Episode: "Smilin' Jack"
1997	Dangerous Minds	Teddy Dean	Episode: "Teach, Don't Touch"
1998	Step by Step	Lieutenant Muldoon	Episode: "The Understudy"
1999	Vengeance Unlimited	Kevin Battles	Episode: "Critical"
1999	G vs E	Lizard	Episode: "Lady Evil"
1999	The Pretender	Kessler	Episode: "Angel's Flight"
2000	Star Trek: Voyager	Donik	Episode: "Flesh and Blood"
2000	The Amanda Show		Episode: "Mammal-O's"
2000	Cover Me	Gil Fedder	Episode: "The Hit Parade"
2001	FreakyLinks	Conrad Biggs	2 episodes
2003	Las Vegas	Nervous Guy	Episode: "Luck Be a Lady"
2005	Monk	Frank Ruttle - Photographer	Episode: "Mr. Monk Goes to a Wedding"
2007	The Closer	Kenny Woods	Episode: "Dumb Luck"
2008	iCarly	Detective Stuart 'Spanky' Stimbler	Episode: "iStakeout"
2008	Bones	Poacher #2	Episode: "The Bone That Blew"
2012	Austin & Ally	Tommy Clarkson	Episode: "Austin & Jessie & Ally All Star New Year: Part 1"
2015	Amnesia	Jarod	Episode: "Awakening"

== Stage credits ==
Year	Title	Role	Location	Notes
	Camelot		The Muny, St. Louis, Missouri	
	The Sound of Music		The Muny, St. Louis, Missouri	
	Sleeping Beauty		The Muny, St. Louis, Missouri	
	Hans Christian Anderson		The Muny, St. Louis, Missouri	
	Cinderella		The Muny, St. Louis, Missouri	
1981	A Christmas Carol	Tiny Tim / Young Scrooge	Loretta Hilton/Westport Plaza Theater	
1982	A Tale of Two Cities		Loretta Hilton Theater	
1995	The Conquest of the South Pole	Buesher	The Lost Studio (The Loft)	
1996	La Ronde	The Poet	The Lost Studio (The Loft)	
2000	A Night Out	Gidney	The Lost Studio (The Loft)	Featuring Chris Coppola and Robert Romanus
2006	Happy Days	Ralph Malph	Falcon Theatre	Directed by Garry Marshall
2007	Mental: The Musical	Dr. Gary	Edgemar Center for the Arts	
	Plunge		Actor's Circle Theatre, Culver City	
	Arcadia	Gus / Augustus	Mark Taper Forum	
	Coming Attractions		Royal Scots Club	

== Accolades ==
Festival	Year	Title	Award	Result	Ref.
9th Youth in Film Awards	1987	Highway to Heaven (episode "For the Love of Harry") (NBC)	Best Young Actor Guest Starring in a Television Drama Series	Nominated	
9th Youth in Film Awards	1987	Webster (episode "Honor Thy Grandfather") (ABC)	Best Young Actor Guest-Starring in a Television Comedy Series	Nominated	
10th Youth in Film Awards	1989	Mama's Family (NBC)	Best Young Actor Guest-Starring in a Syndicated Family Comedy, Drama, or Special	Nominated	
11th Youth in Film Awards	1990	Life Goes On (ABC)	Best Young Actor Guest Starring in a Television Series	Nominated	
