= Free Spirit (TV series) =

American sitcom (1989–1990)

- Genre: Fantasy sitcom
- Created by: Leslie Ray; Steven Vail
- Developed by: Tim O'Donnell
- Starring: Corinne Bohrer; Franc Luz; Edan Gross; Alyson Hannigan; Paul Scherrer
- Theme music composer: Steve Dorff; John Bettis
- Opening theme: "She's a Free Spirit"
- Composer: David Michael Frank
- Country of origin: United States
- Original language: English
- No. of seasons: 1
- No. of episodes: 14

Production
- Executive producers: Phil Doran; Richard Gurman
- Producers: Mark Fink; Howard Meyers
- Camera setup: Videotape, multi-camera
- Running time: 24 mins
- Production companies: ELP Communications; Columbia Pictures Television

Original release
- Network: ABC
- Release: September 22, 1989 – January 21, 1990

Free Spirit is an American fantasy sitcom that aired on ABC during the 1989–1990 television season. The series stars Corinne Bohrer as a witch who moves in with a recently divorced father to help care for his three children. Originally produced by ELP Communications, Free Spirit aired from September 22, 1989, to January 21, 1990.

== Overview ==
Free Spirit follows the misadventures of a mischievous and vivacious witch named Winnie Goodwinn (Corinne Bohrer) who is summoned by 10-year-old Gene (Edan Gross) with a wish, and is subsequently hired as a live-in housekeeper by Gene's father Thomas J. Harper (Franc Luz), a recently divorced lawyer. Winnie looks after Thomas' three children, Gene, 13-year-old Jessie (Alyson Hannigan) and 16-year-old Robb (Paul Scherrer) who are still adjusting to their parents' divorce and their move from New York City to suburban Connecticut.

Thomas has no idea that Winnie is a witch, but his three children do. Although Winnie is good-hearted and never means any harm, her powers frequently get her and the family into trouble. Winnie often has to scramble to get out of various situations while keeping Thomas from learning her secret.

== Cast ==
=== Main ===
- Corinne Bohrer as Winnie Goodwinn
- Franc Luz as Thomas J. Harper
- Edan Gross as Gene Harper
- Alyson Hannigan as Jessie Harper
- Paul Scherrer as Robb Harper

== Production ==
=== Casting ===
In the unaired pilot, Christopher Rich portrayed the role of Thomas Harper and Shonda Whipple portrayed Jessie Harper. Since the show was originally conceived as a vehicle for Edan Gross and Corinne Bohrer, producers felt that Rich and Whipple were replaceable. Only the second version of the pilot aired with Franc Luz and Alyson Hannigan in their respective roles.

== Broadcast history ==
Sneak preview TV Guide advertisement

Free Spirit premiered as a preview broadcast on September 22, 1989, at 9:30/8:30c, on the first night in which ABC's Friday lineup used the now-popular TGIF format. On September 24, the series moved into its regular time slot of Sunday at 8/7c, airing between two other freshman series, Life Goes On and Homeroom.

== Episodes ==
No.	Title	Directed by	Written by	Original release date
1	"Pilot"	Art Dielhenn	Leslie Ray	September 22, 1989
A lawyer hires an inept witch to be a housekeeper for his three children, only to have the kids find out the truth about her.
2	"The Bosses Are Coming"	Art Dielhenn	Howard Meyers & Susan Meyers	September 24, 1989
Using the guise of Thomas' clients, Winnie's boss wants to take her back to the Witches' Realm, prompting Winnie to make a deal to remain in the mortal world. Dann Florek guest stars.
3	"Wedding Bell Blues"	Art Dielhenn	Richard Gurman & Phil Doran	October 1, 1989
After Thomas' date backs out of a wedding invitation, he asks Winnie to go with him to the event, but she might want to check her attire before going.
4	"Too Much of a Good Thing"	Art Dielhenn	Kevin Abbott	October 8, 1989
After Winnie casts a love spell on a girl that Robb has the hots for, Robb learns that he is the only one who can break the spell. Alli Brown and Seth Green guest star.
5	"Guess Who's Staying for Dinner?"	Art Dielhenn	Mark Fink	October 22, 1989
A sexy client, whose 80-year-old husband has died, wants to be Thomas' next wife, prompting a jealous Winnie to find out the real reason behind this sudden proposal. Teri Austin guest stars.
6	"Hallowinnie"	Art Dielhenn	Bob Rosenfarb	October 29, 1989
Jessie is hoping that she will join a clique on Halloween, an event Winnie despises. But when Thomas suggests that Jessie throw a party for the group, Winnie reluctantly gives in by performing a magic trick on Jessie, which comes in handy at the party as she finds out the group's true intentions. Anne Marie McEvoy and Maia Brewton guest star.
7	"Two for the Road"	Art Dielhenn	Mark Fink	November 5, 1989
After Thomas buys a convertible for Robb and Winnie to share, it's an excited Winnie who really gets behind the wheel, and a furious Robb is ready to take the keys away from her.
8	"Not with My Sister You Don't"	Art Dielhenn	April Kelly	November 19, 1989
Winnie becomes concerned about Jessie's date in more ways than one. Claudette Nevins guest stars.
9	"Love That Winnie"	Art Dielhenn	Bob Rosenfarb	December 3, 1989
Winnie imagines herself in an episode of The Donna Reed Show as a way to be the perfect homemaker, but she's about to discover that being one in real life is not like a TV show.
10	"The New Secretary"	Art Dielhenn	Martin Pasko & Rebecca Parr Cioffi	December 10, 1989
Winnie is hired as Thomas' secretary and gets involved with a divorced couple (Florence Henderson and Robert Reed), who still have feelings for each other.
11	"Radio Nights"	Art Dielhenn	Howard Meyers & Susan Meyers	December 17, 1989
Thomas is left stranded at a radio station after a thunderstorm causes a tree to fall and block off a bridge. The storm also strips Winnie of her powers, while Gene fears that he will not see his father again. Timothy Stack guest stars.
12	"We Gotta Be Me"	Art Dielhenn	Kevin Abbott	January 7, 1990
In an effort to stop his annoying behavior, Jessie and Gene ask Winnie to split Robb into two guys... and they still get more annoyed by the results. Rebecca Balding guest stars.
13	"Blast from the Past"	Art Dielhenn	Ellen Guylas	January 14, 1990
After a courtship that spans 150 years, Winnie's warlock fiancee Kevin (Dave Coulier) finally asks her to marry him. Michael Constantine also guest stars.
14	"Love and Death"	Phil Squyres	Phil Doran	January 21, 1990
When Winnie's kid sister Cassandra (Josie Davis) visits, she sweeps Robb off his feet, prompting Winnie to dust off this spirited romance.

== Reception and cancellation ==
Critical reviews of Free Spirit were generally negative. In a poll conducted by Electronic Media, television critics voted it the worst show on television. In addition to poor critical reception, the series struggled in the ratings. After ratings failed to improve, ABC canceled Free Spirit in January 1990. The last episode of the fourteen produced was never aired in the United States.

== Awards nominations ==
Year	Award	Category	Nominee
1990	Young Artist Awards	Best New Television Series	–
1990	Young Artist Awards	Best Young Actress Starring in a Television Series	Alyson Hannigan
1990	Young Artist Awards	Best Young Actor Supporting Role in a Television Series	Paul Scherrer
