= Little Dracula =

Book series by Martin Waddell

- Author: Martin Waddell
- Cover artist: Joseph Wright
- Series: Little Dracula
- Genre: Children's books Picture books
- Publisher: Walker Books/Candlewick Press
- Publication date: 1986–present
- Publication place: United Kingdom; United States
- Media type: Book

Little Dracula is a British series of children's books and an American animated television series that originally aired on Fox. Little Dracula revolves around a green-skinned child vampire who aspires to be like his father, Big Dracula, yet also enjoys rock 'n roll and surfing. Little Dracula also has a monstrous friend named Werebunny, and his Transylvanian family of strange characters is often threatened by the villainous Garlic Man.

== Book series ==
The Little Dracula book series, originally published by Walker Books and later reissued in the US through Candlewick Press, debuted in 1986. It was penned by writer Martin Waddell and illustrated by Joseph Wright; although, a joke book was written by Alan Durant with illustration by Paul Tempest. The paperback stories, recommended for ages 4–8, rely heavily on Wright's gory yet humorous illustrations. They detail Little Dracula's spooky lifestyle which includes bowling with skulls and drinking a glass of blood before sleeping in his miniature coffin. Other morbid scenes include Mrs. Dracula emptying the brain from a severed head into a frying pan for breakfast and children playing tennis with rackets strung with cat guts. Dubbed "too silly to be truly spooky," the series received praise by Publishers Weekly and School Library Journal particularly for its meticulous illustrations which were also regarded as "not for the squeamish."

While the majority of Little Dracula books were released during the 1980s and early 1990s, some were reissued in the US as recently October 2001. This may have been to capitalize on the brief revitalization of the animated series the prior year.

Title	Date	ISBN
Little Dracula's First Bite	7 October 1986	0-14-050657-8
Little Dracula's Christmas	4 November 1986	0-14-050658-6
Little Dracula at the Seaside	30 July 1987	0-7445-0531-3
Little Dracula at the Seashore (Reissue)	2 March 1992	1-56402-026-6
Little Dracula Goes to School	2 March 1992	1-56402-027-4
Little Dracula's Fiendishly Funny Joke Book	28 May 1992	0-7445-2393-1
Little Dracula's Fangtastic Fun Book	28 May 1992	0-7445-2189-0
Little Dracula's Monstrous Poster	28 May 1992	0-7445-2392-3
Little Dracula's Other Monstrous Poster	28 May 1992	0-7445-2395-8
Little Dracula's Joke Book (Reissue)	3 July 2000	0-7445-7777-2
Little Dracula's First Christmas (Reissue)	8 October 2001	0-7445-7843-4
