= List of American film actresses =

The following American film actresses are listed alphabetically. It contains both actresses born American and those who acquired American nationality later.

Some actors who are well known for both film and TV work are also included in the list of American television actresses.

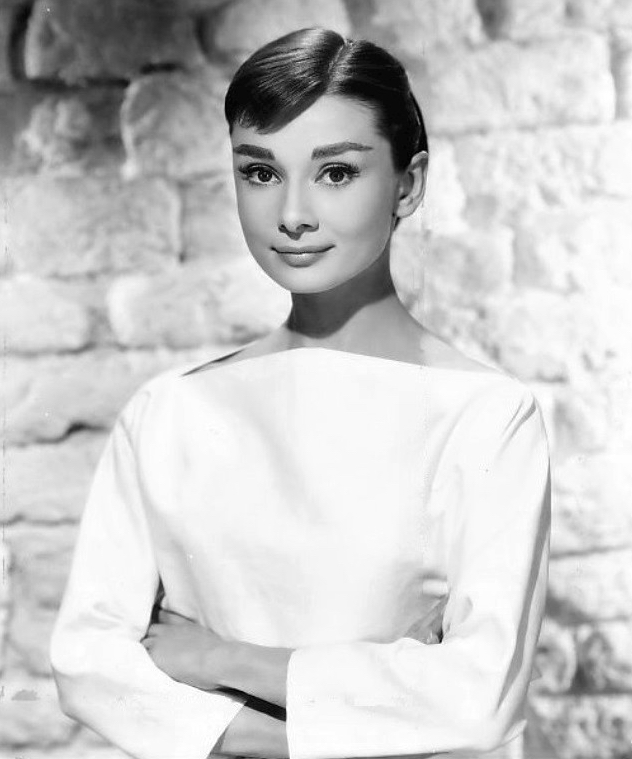
Audrey Hepburn

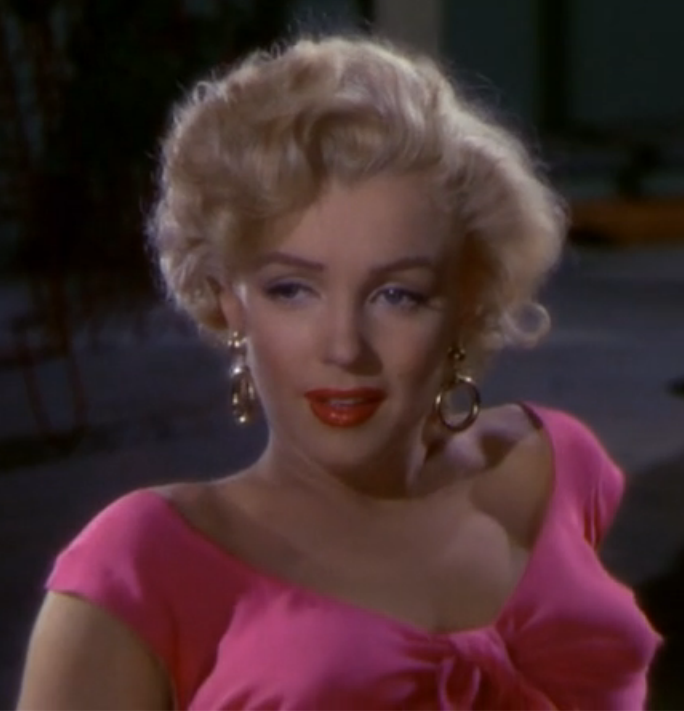
Marilyn Monroe

Elizabeth Taylor

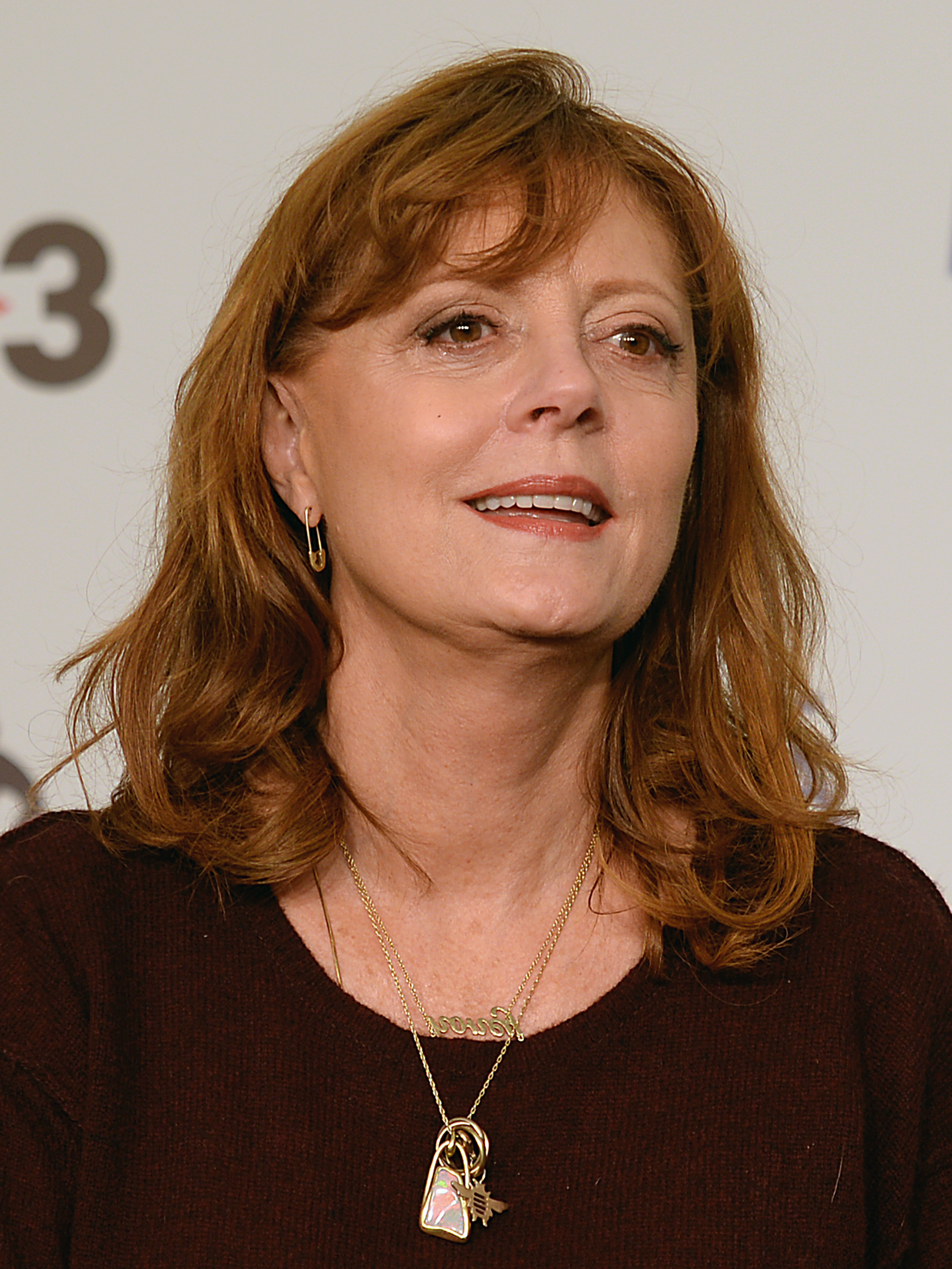
Susan Sarandon

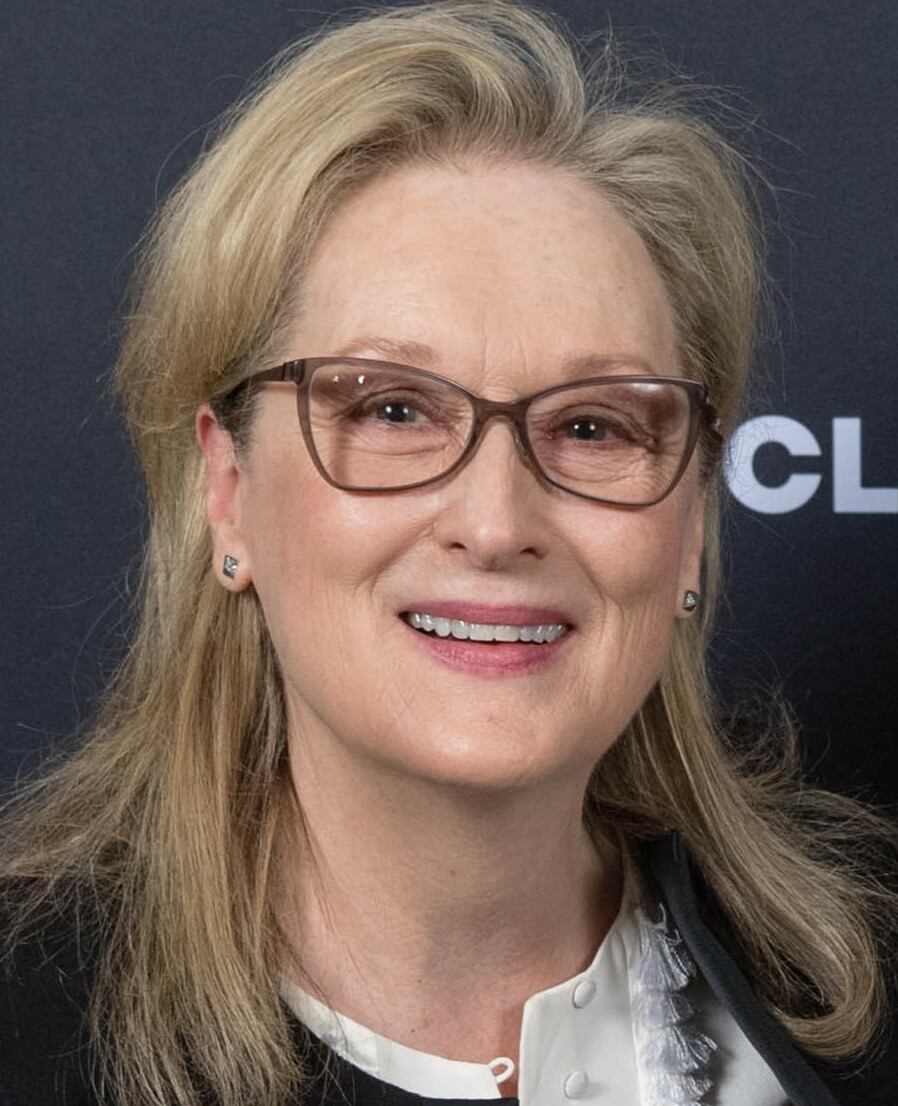
Meryl Streep

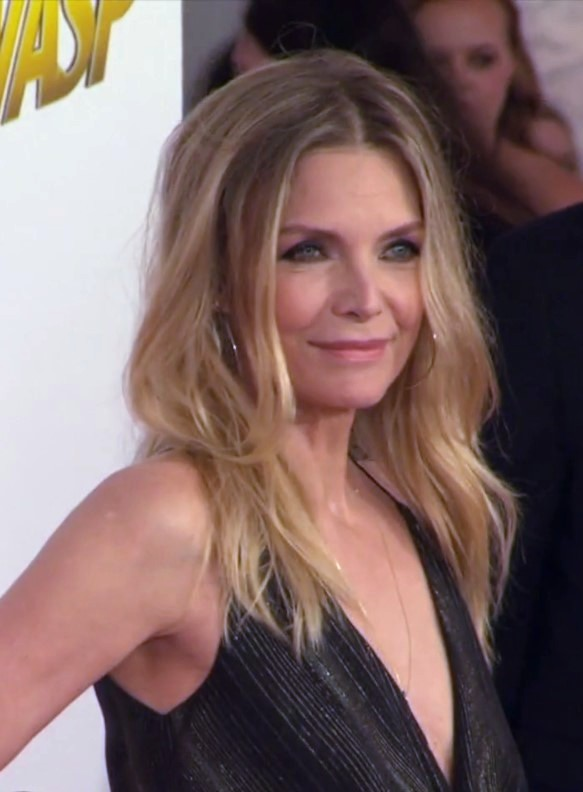
Michelle Pfeiffer

Angela Bassett

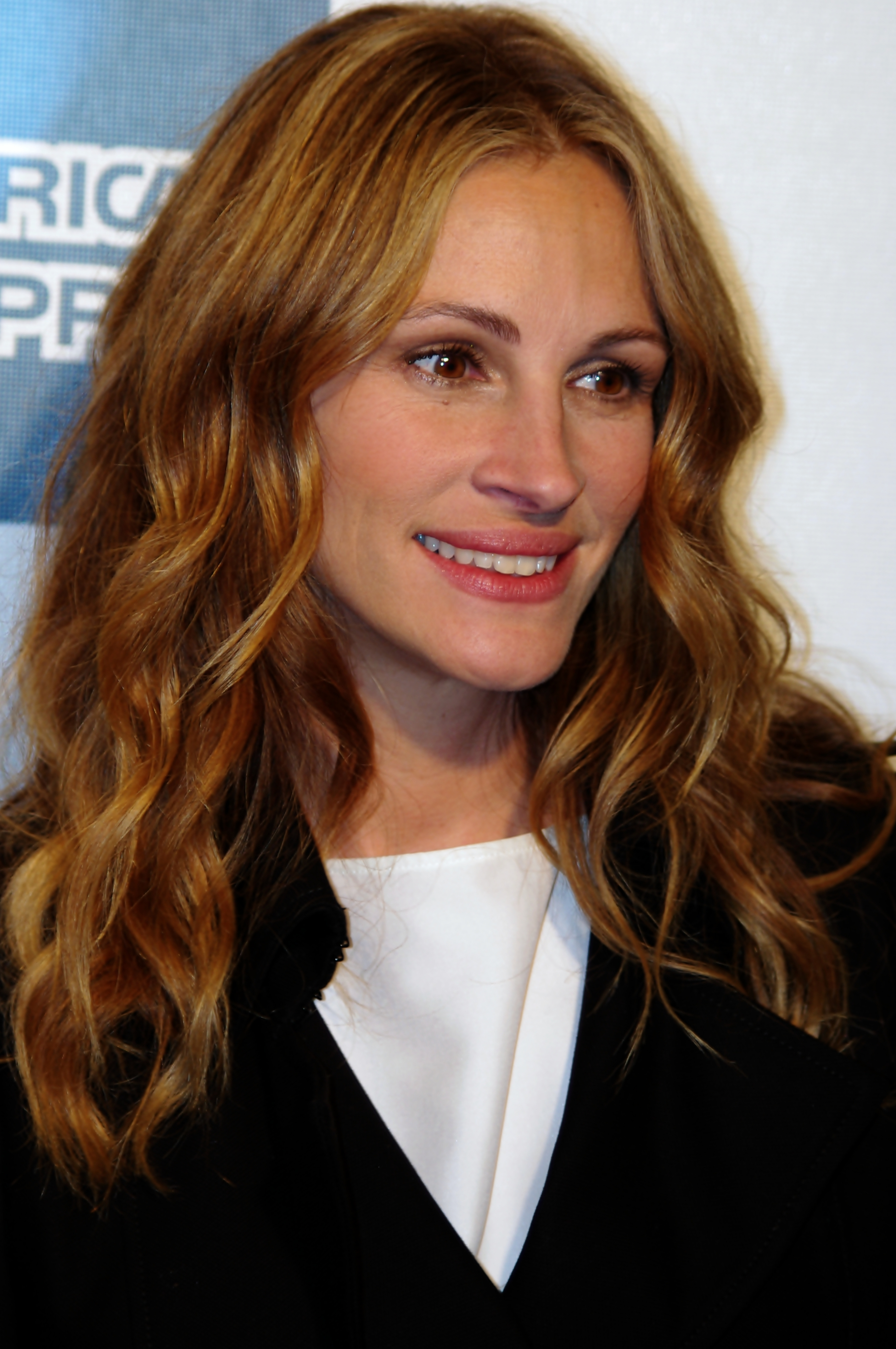
Julia Roberts

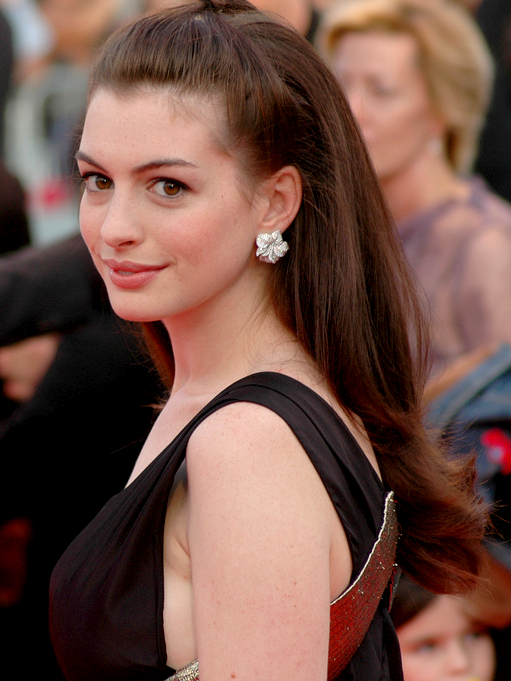
Anne Hathaway

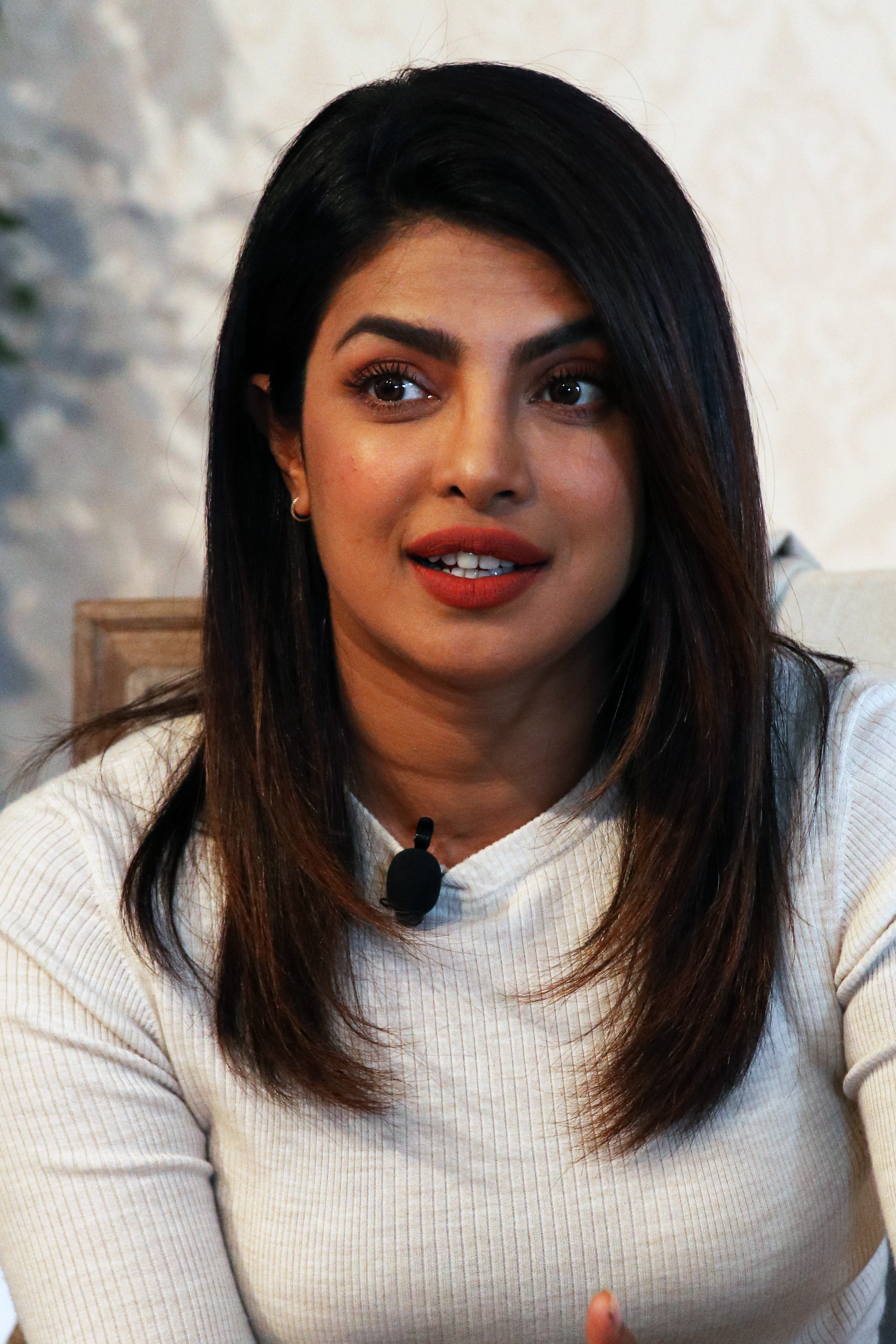
Priyanka Chopra

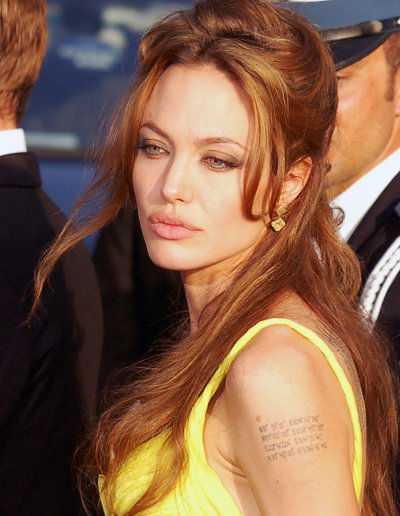
Angelina Jolie

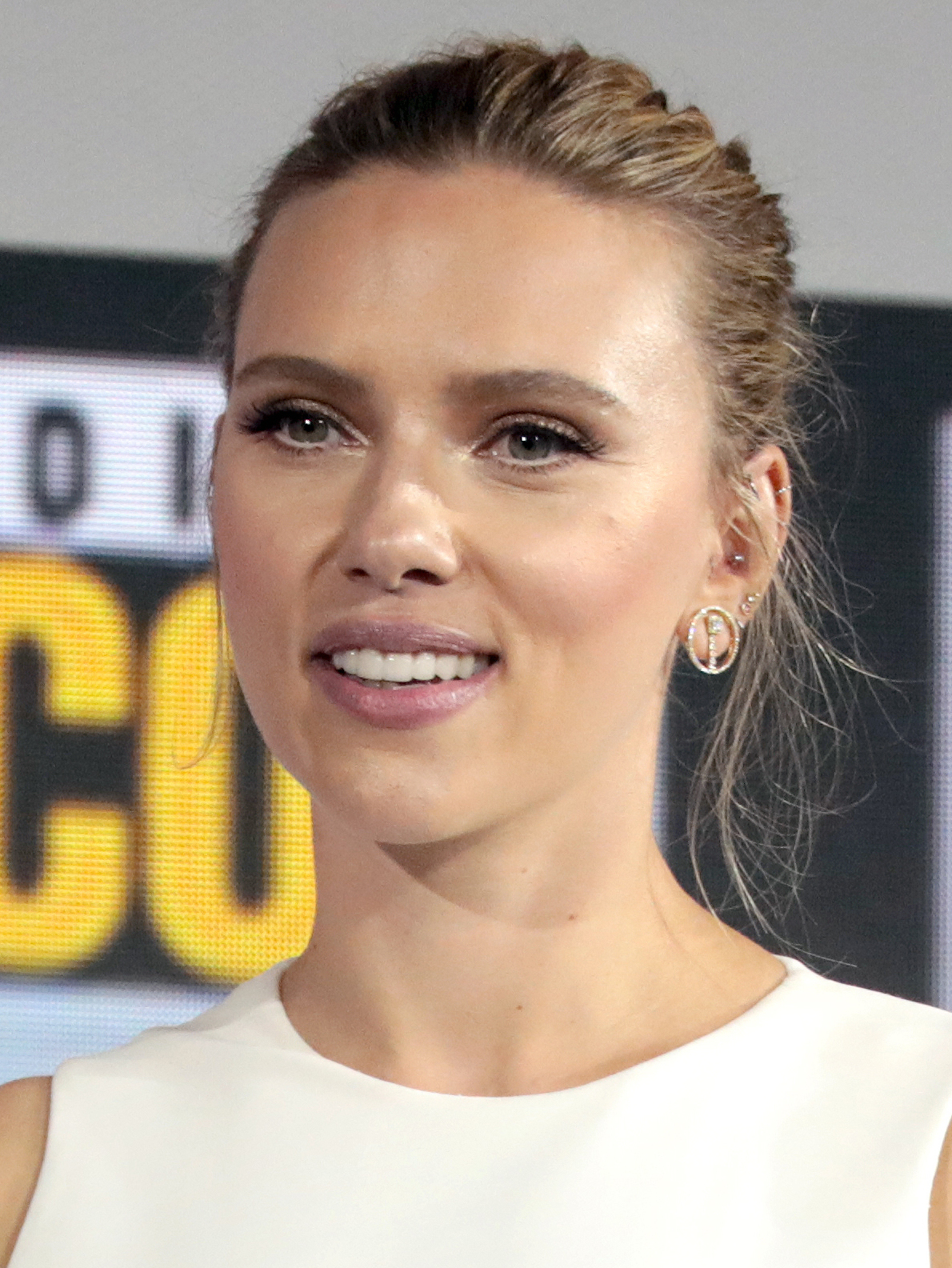
Scarlett Johansson

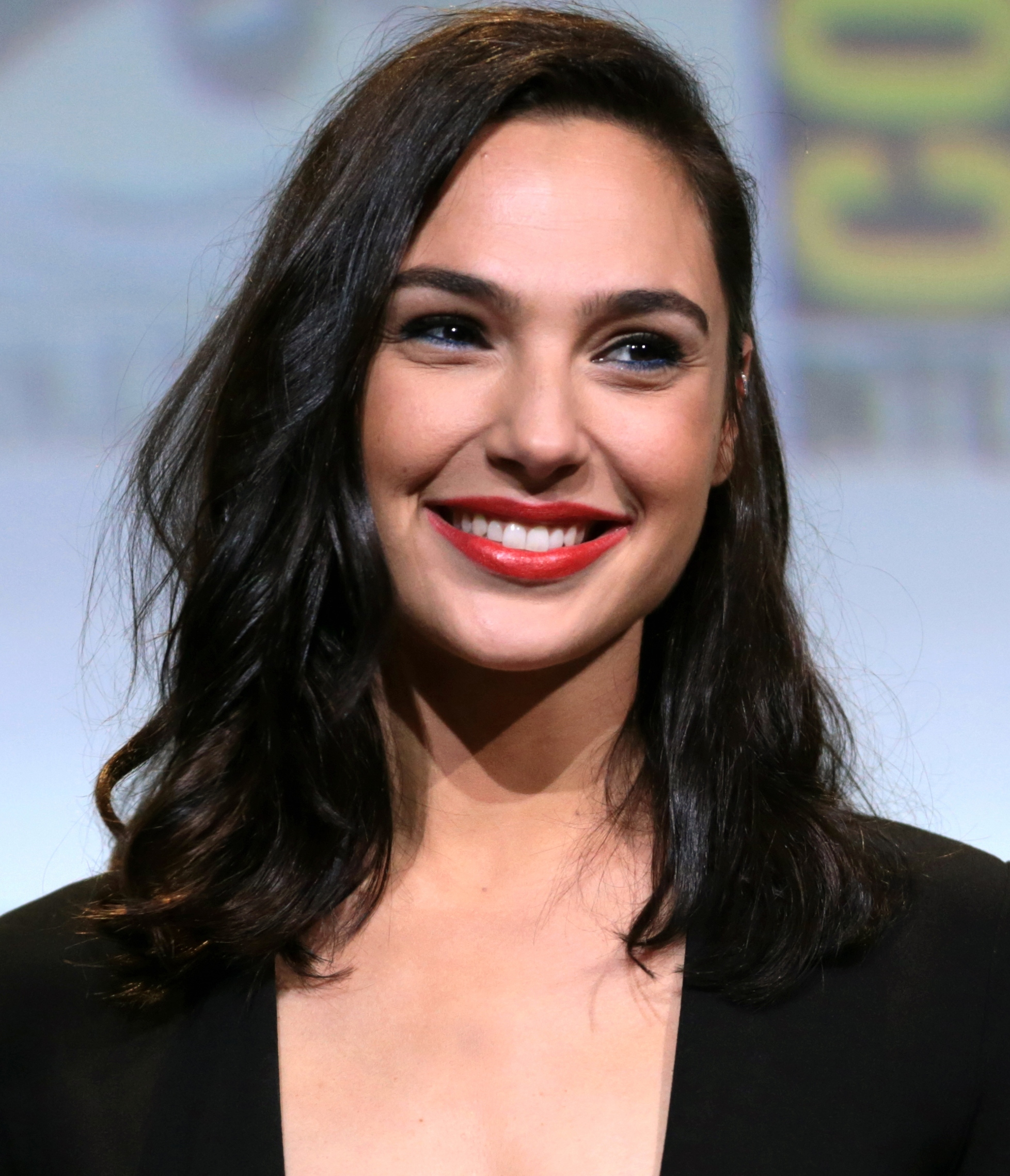
Gal Gadot

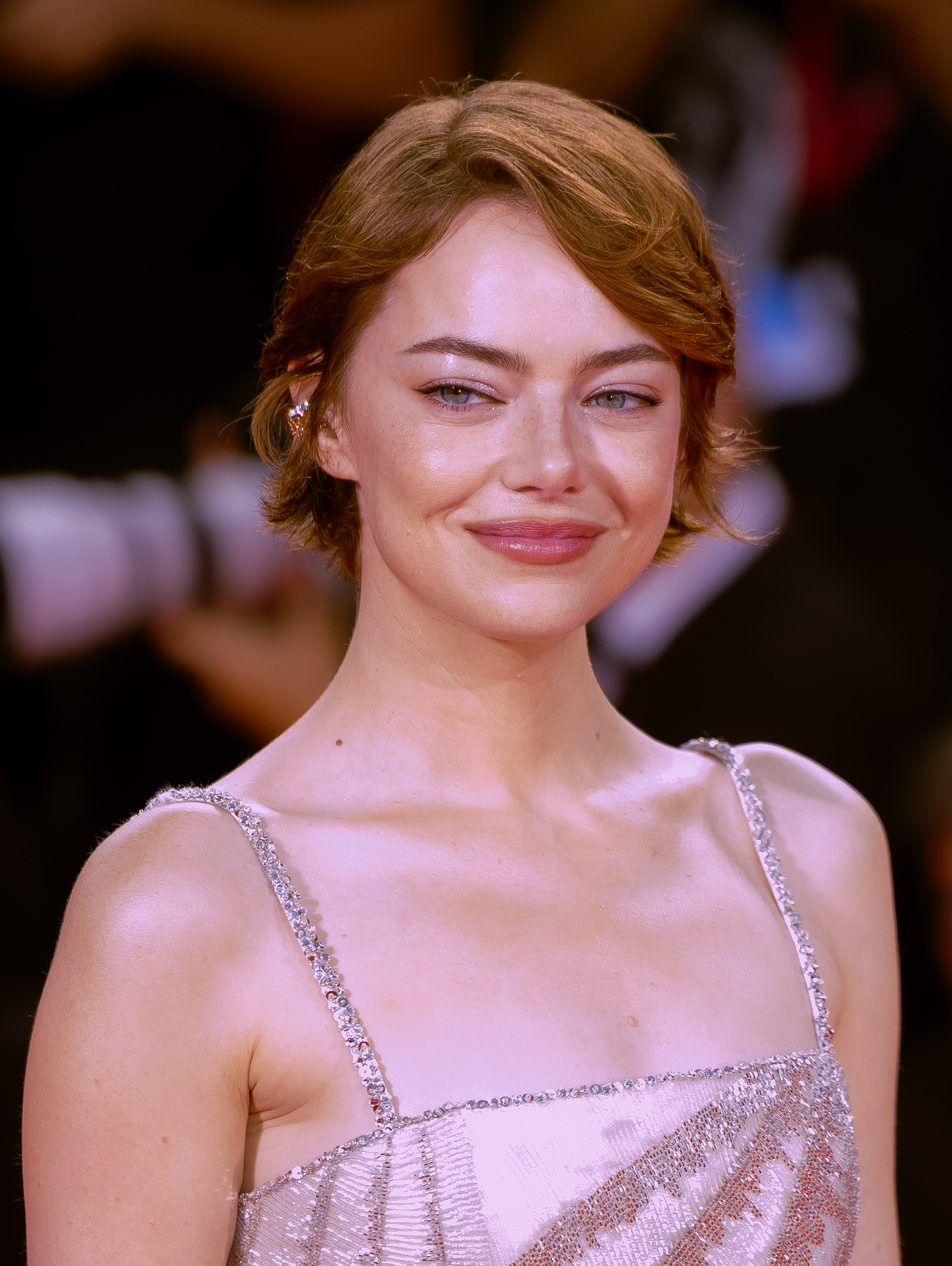
Emma Stone

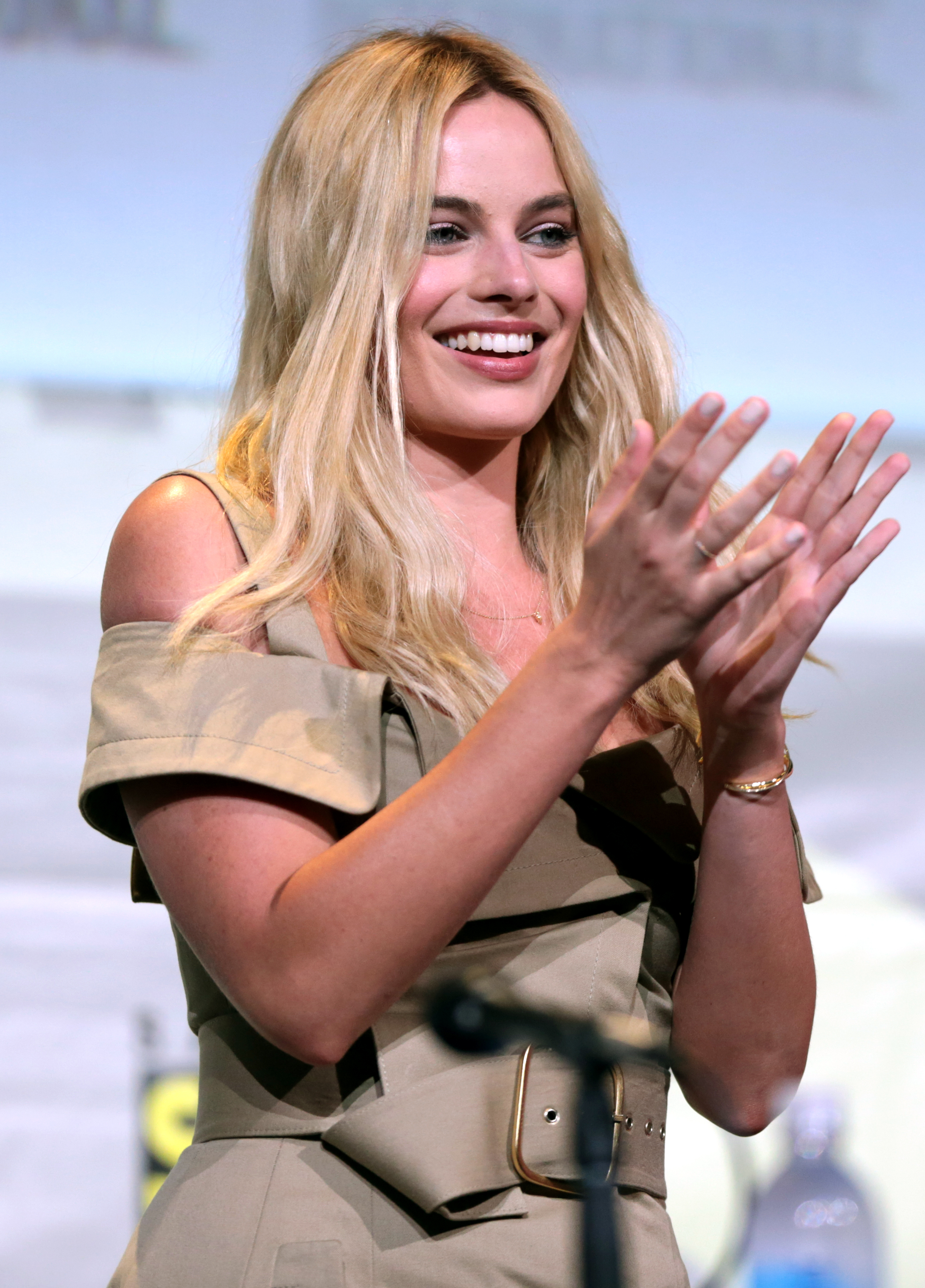
Margot Robbie

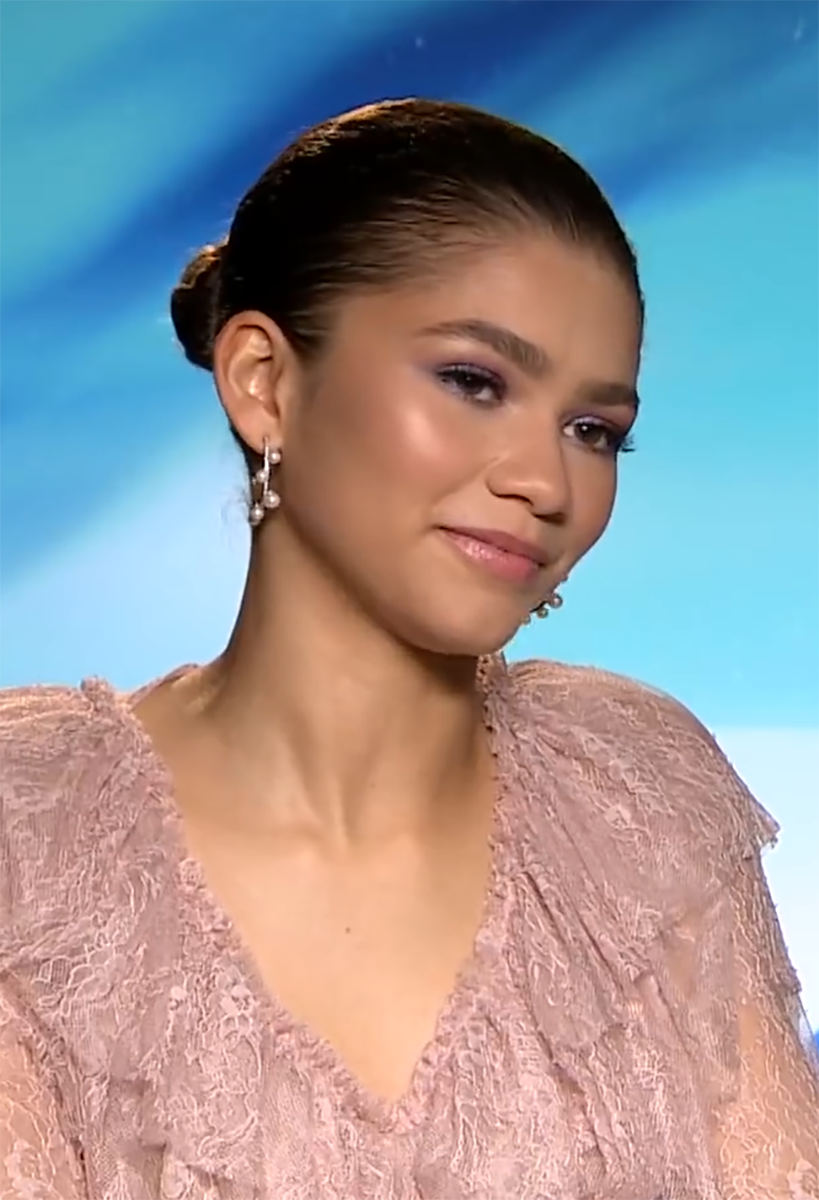
Zendaya

Key to entries:

born in Nation: this person was born abroad but was American by birth
Nationality-born: this person acquired American citizenship later in life
a range is birth–death years
if year of death only is known, that is stated explicitly

== A ==
- Beverly Aadland 1942–2010
- Mariann Aalda born May 7, 1948 (age 78)
- Caroline Aaron born August 7, 1952 (age 74)
- Diahnne Abbott born May 1, 1945 (age 81)
- Rose Abdoo born November 28, 1962 (age 63)
- Paula Abdul born June 19, 1962 (age 64)
- Donzaleigh Abernathy born August 5, 1957 (age 69)
- Whitney Able born June 2, 1982 (age 44)
- Candice Accola born May 13, 1987 (age 39)
- Amy Acker born December 5, 1976 (age 49)
- Jean Acker 1893–1978
- Bettye Ackerman 1924–2006
- Isabella Acres born February 21, 2001 (age 25)
- Amy Adams born August 20, 1974 (age 52) (born in Italy)
- Brooke Adams born February 8, 1949 (age 77)
- Edie Adams 1927–2008
- Jane Adams 1918–2014
- Jane Adams born April 1, 1965 (age 61)
- Joey Lauren Adams born January 9, 1968 (age 58)
- Julie Adams 1926–2019
- Lillian Adams 1922–2011
- Marla Adams 1938–2024
- Mary Kay Adams born September 12, 1962 (age 64)
- Nancy Addison 1946–2002
- Uzo Aduba born February 10, 1981 (age 45)
- Shohreh Aghdashloo born May 11, 1952 (age 74) (Iranian-born)
- Dianna Agron born April 30, 1986 (age 40)
- Christina Aguilera born December 18, 1980 (age 45)
- Lexi Ainsworth born October 28, 1992 (age 34)
- Malin Akerman born May 12, 1978 (age 48) (Swedish-born)
- Jessica Alba born April 28, 1981 (age 45)
- Lola Albright 1924–2017
- Denise Alexander 1939–2025
- Erika Alexander born November 19, 1969 (age 56)
- Jaimie Alexander born March 12, 1984 (age 42)
- Jane Alexander born October 28, 1939 (age 87)
- Khandi Alexander born September 4, 1957 (age 69)
- Sasha Alexander born May 17, 1973 (age 53)
- Kristian Alfonso born September 5, 1963 (age 63)
- Tatyana Ali born January 24, 1979 (age 47)
- Mary Alice 1936–2022
- Ana Alicia born December 12, 1956 (age 69) (born in Mexico)
- Christa B. Allen born November 11, 1991 (age 34)
- Debbie Allen born January 16, 1950 (age 76)
- Elizabeth Allen 1929–2006
- Joan Allen born August 20, 1956 (age 70)
- Jonelle Allen born July 8, 1948 (age 78)
- Karen Allen born October 5, 1951 (age 75)
- Krista Allen born April 5, 1971 (age 55)
- Laura Allen born March 21, 1974 (age 52)
- Nancy Allen born June 24, 1950 (age 76)
- Rosalind Allen born September 23, 1957 (age 69) (born in New Zealand)
- Kirstie Alley 1951–2022
- Jamie Anne Allman born April 6, 1977 (age 49)
- June Allyson 1917–2006
- Daniella Alonso born September 22, 1978 (age 48)
- María Conchita Alonso born June 29, 1955 (age 71)
- Trini Alvarado born January 10, 1967 (age 59)
- Izabella Alvarez born March 1, 2004 (age 22)
- Lauren Ambrose born February 20, 1978 (age 48)
- Mädchen Amick born December 12, 1970 (age 55)
- Suzy Amis born January 5, 1962 (age 64)
- Eva Amurri born March 15, 1985 (age 41)
- Kristina Anapau born October 30, 1979 (age 47)
- Andrea Anders born May 10, 1975 (age 51)
- Gillian Anderson born August 9, 1968 (age 58)
- Loni Anderson 1945–2025
- Mary Anderson 1918–2014
- Melissa Sue Anderson born September 26, 1962 (age 64) (American-Canadian)
- Melody Anderson born December 3, 1955 (age 70)
- Nicole Gale Anderson born August 29, 1990 (age 36)
- Jennifer Aniston born February 11, 1969 (age 57)
- Odette Annable born May 10, 1985 (age 41)
- Susan Anton born October 12, 1950 (age 76)
- Shiri Appleby born December 7, 1978 (age 47)
- Christina Applegate born November 25, 1971 (age 54)
- Anne Archer born August 24, 1947 (age 79)
- Beverly Archer born July 19, 1948 (age 78)
- Leila Arcieri born December 18, 1973 (age 52)
- Eve Arden 1908–1990
- Ashley Argota born January 9, 1993 (age 33)
- Jillian Armenante born July 5, 1968 (age 58)
- Bess Armstrong born December 11, 1953 (age 72)
- Ryan Kiera Armstrong born March 10, 2010 (age 16)
- Samaire Armstrong born October 31, 1980 (age 46) (born in Japan)
- Alexis Arquette 1969–2016
- Patricia Arquette born April 8, 1968 (age 58)
- Rosanna Arquette born August 10, 1959 (age 67)
- Bea Arthur 1922–2009
- Jean Arthur 1900–1991
- Katie Aselton born October 1, 1978 (age 48)
- Erica Ash 1977–2024
- Ashanti born October 13, 1980 (age 46)
- Elizabeth Ashley born August 30, 1939 (age 87)
- Mary Astor 1906–1987
- Hayley Atwell born April 5, 1982 (age 44) (British-American)
- Margaret Avery born January 20, 1944 (age 82)
- Nicki Aycox 1975–2022
- Rochelle Aytes born May 17, 1976 (age 50)
- Candice Azzara born May 18, 1945 (age 81)

== B ==
- Lauren Bacall 1924–2014
- Barbara Bach born August 28, 1946 (age 80)
- Catherine Bach born March 1, 1954 (age 72)
- Mary Badham born October 7, 1952 (age 74)
- Jane Badler born December 31, 1953 (age 72)
- Erykah Badu born February 26, 1971 (age 55)
- Katherine Bailess born April 24, 1980 (age 46)
- Laura Bailey born May 28, 1981 (age 45)
- Pearl Bailey 1918–1990
- Barbara Bain born September 13, 1931 (age 95)
- Fay Bainter 1893–1968
- Diora Baird born April 6, 1983 (age 43)
- Blanche Baker born December 20, 1956 (age 69)
- Carroll Baker born May 28, 1931 (age 95)
- Diane Baker born February 25, 1938 (age 88)
- Kathy Baker born June 8, 1950 (age 76)
- Leigh-Allyn Baker born March 13, 1972 (age 54)
- Brenda Bakke born May 15, 1963 (age 63)
- Fairuza Balk born May 21, 1974 (age 52)
- Lucille Ball 1911–1989
- Kaye Ballard 1925–2019
- Talia Balsam born March 5, 1959 (age 67)
- Anne Bancroft 1931–2005
- Lisa Banes 1955–2021
- Tallulah Bankhead 1902–1968
- Elizabeth Banks born February 10, 1974 (age 52)
- Tyra Banks born December 4, 1973 (age 52)
- Theda Bara 1885–1955
- Christine Baranski born May 2, 1952 (age 74)
- Adrienne Barbeau born June 11, 1945 (age 81)
- Ellen Barkin born April 16, 1954 (age 72)
- Joanna Barnes 1934–2022
- Priscilla Barnes born December 7, 1954 (age 71)
- Claudia Barrett 1929–2021
- Majel Barrett 1932–2008
- Barbara Barrie 1931–2026
- Dana Barron born April 22, 1966 (age 60)
- Drew Barrymore born February 22, 1975 (age 51)
- Ethel Barrymore 1879–1959
- Roseanne Barr born November 3, 1952 (age 74)
- Bonnie Bartlett born June 20, 1929 (age 97)
- Mischa Barton born January 24, 1986 (age 40)
- Ella Jay Basco born September 17, 2006 (age 20)
- Kim Basinger born December 8, 1953 (age 72)
- Angela Bassett born August 16, 1958 (age 68)
- Justine Bateman born February 19, 1966 (age 60)
- Florence Bates 1888–1954
- Kathy Bates born June 28, 1948 (age 78)
- Cyia Batten born January 26, 1972 (age 54)
- Frances Bavier 1902–1989
- Barbara Baxley 1923–1990
- Anne Baxter 1923–1985
- Meredith Baxter born June 21, 1947 (age 79)
- Jennifer Beals born December 19, 1963 (age 62)
- Amanda Bearse born August 9, 1958 (age 68)
- Madisen Beaty born February 28, 1995 (age 31)
- Louise Beavers 1902–1962
- Kimberly Beck born January 9, 1956 (age 70)
- Irene Bedard born July 22, 1967 (age 59)
- Bonnie Bedelia born March 25, 1948 (age 78)
- Nicole Beharie born January 3, 1985 (age 41)
- Beth Behrs born December 26, 1985 (age 40)
- Doris Belack 1926–2011
- Ashley Bell born May 26, 1986 (age 40)
- Catherine Bell born August 14, 1968 (age 58) (born in England)
- Jillian Bell born April 25, 1984 (age 42)
- Kristen Bell born July 18, 1980 (age 46)
- Lake Bell born March 24, 1979 (age 47)
- Camilla Belle born October 2, 1986 (age 40)
- Kathleen Beller born February 19, 1956 (age 70)
- Troian Bellisario born October 28, 1985 (age 41)
- Maria Bello born April 18, 1967 (age 59)
- Bea Benaderet 1906–1968
- Andrea Bendewald born March 4, 1970 (age 56)
- Annette Bening born May 29, 1958 (age 68)
- Constance Bennett 1904–1965
- Haley Bennett born January 7, 1988 (age 38)
- Joan Bennett 1910–1990
- Melissa Benoist born October 4, 1988 (age 38)
- Amber Benson born January 8, 1977 (age 49)
- Ashley Benson born December 18, 1989 (age 36)
- Jodi Benson born October 10, 1961 (age 65)
- Julie Benz born May 1, 1972 (age 54)
- Candice Bergen born May 9, 1946 (age 80)
- Polly Bergen 1930–2014
- Elizabeth Berkley born July 28, 1972 (age 54)
- Jeannie Berlin born November 1, 1949 (age 77)
- Emma Berman born August 1, 2008 (age 18)
- Crystal Bernard born September 30, 1961 (age 65)
- Sandra Bernhard born June 6, 1955 (age 71)
- Halle Berry born August 14, 1966 (age 60)
- Valerie Bertinelli born April 23, 1960 (age 66)
- Angela Bettis born January 9, 1973 (age 53)
- Troy Beyer born November 7, 1964 (age 62)
- Mayim Bialik born December 12, 1975 (age 50)
- Leslie Bibb born November 17, 1973 (age 52)
- Jessica Biel born March 3, 1982 (age 44)
- Barbara Billingsley 1915–2010
- Rachel Bilson born August 25, 1981 (age 45)
- Traci Bingham born January 13, 1968 (age 58)
- Thora Birch born March 11, 1982 (age 44)
- Kerry Bishé born May 1, 1984 (age 42) (born in New Zealand)
- Summer Bishil born July 17, 1988 (age 38)
- Julie Bishop 1914–2001
- Danielle Bisutti born October 1, 1976 (age 50)
- Karen Black 1939–2013
- Sofia Black-D'Elia born December 23, 1991 (age 34)
- Joan Blackman 1938–2026
- Betsy Blair 1923–2009
- Linda Blair born January 22, 1959 (age 67)
- Patricia Blair 1933–2013
- Selma Blair born June 23, 1972 (age 54)
- Vivien Lyra Blair born June 4, 2012 (age 14)
- Amanda Blake 1929–1989
- Susan Blakely born September 7, 1948 (age 78)
- Ronee Blakley born August 24, 1945 (age 81)
- Jolene Blalock born March 5, 1975 (age 51)
- Rowan Blanchard born October 14, 2001 (age 25)
- Tammy Blanchard born December 14, 1976 (age 49)
- Cate Blanchett born May 14, 1969 (age 57) (born in Australia)
- Sally Blane 1910–1997
- Alexis Bledel born September 16, 1981 (age 45)
- Yasmine Bleeth born June 14, 1968 (age 58)
- Mary J. Blige born January 11, 1971 (age 55)
- Trinity Bliss born November 6, 2009 (age 17)
- Joan Blondell 1906–1979
- Nikki Blonsky born November 9, 1988 (age 37)
- Moon Bloodgood born September 20, 1975 (age 51)
- Lindsay Bloom born August 28, 1950 (age 76)
- Verna Bloom 1938–2019
- Emily Blunt born February 23, 1983 (age 43) (British-born)
- Ann Blyth 1927–2026
- Eleanor Boardman 1898–1991
- Corinne Bohrer born October 18, 1958 (age 68)
- Mary Boland 1880–1965
- Melissa Bolona born December 28, 1989 (age 36)
- Beulah Bondi 1889–1981
- Lisa Bonet born November 16, 1967 (age 58)
- Shirley Booth 1898–1992
- Olive Borden 1906–1947
- Alex Borstein born February 15, 1973 (age 53)
- Michelle Borth born August 19, 1978 (age 48)
- Samantha Boscarino born December 26, 1994 (age 31)
- Rachel Boston born May 9, 1982 (age 44)
- Kate Bosworth born January 2, 1983 (age 43)
- Barbara Bouchet born August 15, 1943 (age 83) (born in Germany)
- Julie Bovasso 1930–1991
- Clara Bow 1905–1965
- Katrina Bowden born September 19, 1988 (age 38)
- Lilan Bowden born September 1, 1985 (age 41)
- Andrea Bowen born March 4, 1990 (age 36)
- Julie Bowen born March 3, 1970 (age 56)
- Kansas Bowling born August 2, 1996 (age 30)
- Eileen Bowman born May 8, 1966 (age 60)
- Jessica Bowman born November 26, 1980 (age 45)
- Jenna Boyd born March 4, 1993 (age 33)
- Anise Boyer 1914–2008
- Lara Flynn Boyle born March 24, 1970 (age 56)
- Lucy Boynton born January 17, 1994 (age 32)
- Lorraine Bracco born October 2, 1954 (age 72)
- Alice Brady 1892–1939
- Pyper Braun born August 5, 2013 (age 13)
- Alexandra Breckenridge born May 15, 1982 (age 44)
- Tracey E. Bregman born May 29, 1963 (age 63) (born in Germany)
- Lucille Bremer 1917–1996
- Eileen Brennan 1932–2013
- Amy Brenneman born June 22, 1964 (age 62)
- Abigail Breslin born April 14, 1996 (age 30)
- Jordana Brewster born April 26, 1980 (age 46) (born in Panama)
- Paget Brewster born March 10, 1969 (age 57)
- Chloe Bridges born December 27, 1991 (age 34)
- Alison Brie born December 29, 1982 (age 43)
- Connie Britton born March 6, 1967 (age 59)
- Pamela Britton 1923–1974
- Beth Broderick born February 24, 1959 (age 67)
- Jayne Brook born September 16, 1960 (age 66)
- Geraldine Brooks 1925–1977
- Louise Brooks 1906–1985
- Blair Brown born April 23, 1946 (age 80)
- Chelsea Brown 1942–2017
- Kimberlin Brown born June 29, 1961 (age 65)
- Kimberly J. Brown born November 16, 1984 (age 41)
- Olivia Brown born April 10, 1960 (age 66)
- Pat Crawford Brown 1925–2019
- Vanessa Brown 1928–1999
- Yvette Nicole Brown born August 12, 1971 (age 55)
- Leslie Browne born June 29, 1957 (age 69)
- Logan Browning born June 9, 1989 (age 37)
- Sabrina Bryan born September 16, 1984 (age 42)
- Joy Bryant born October 18, 1974 (age 52)
- Nana Bryant 1888-1955
- Tara Buck born March 16, 1975 (age 51)
- Kira Buckland born July 16, 1987 (age 39)
- Betty Buckley born July 3, 1947 (age 79)
- Sandra Bullock born July 26, 1964 (age 62)
- Cara Buono born March 1, 1974 (age 52)
- Candace Cameron Bure born April 6, 1976 (age 50)
- Billie Burke 1884–1970
- Delta Burke born July 30, 1956 (age 70)
- Marylouise Burke born January 20, 1941 (age 85)
- Carol Burnett born April 26, 1933 (age 93)
- Brooke Burns born March 16, 1978 (age 48)
- Catherine Burns 1945-2019
- Heather Burns born April 7, 1975 (age 51)
- Ellen Burstyn born December 7, 1932 (age 93)
- Hilarie Burton born July 1, 1982 (age 44)
- Kate Burton born September 10, 1957 (age 69)
- Sophia Bush born July 8, 1982 (age 44)
- Michelle Buteau born July 24, 1977 (age 49)
- Brett Butler born January 30, 1958 (age 68)
- Yancy Butler born July 2, 1970 (age 56)
- Julia Butters born April 15, 2009 (age 17)
- Ruth Buzzi 1936–2025
- Spring Byington 1886–1971
- Amanda Bynes born April 3, 1986 (age 40)
- Marion Byron 1911–1985

== C ==
- Shirley Caesar born October 13, 1938 (age 88)
- Jeanne Cagney 1919–1984
- Erin Cahill born January 4, 1980 (age 46)
- L. Scott Caldwell born April 17, 1950 (age 76)
- Alice Calhoun 1900–1966
- Monica Calhoun born July 29, 1971 (age 55)
- K Callan born January 9, 1936 (age 90)
- Sarah Wayne Callies born June 1, 1977 (age 49)
- Vanessa Bell Calloway born March 20, 1957 (age 69)
- Anna Camp born September 27, 1982 (age 44)
- Colleen Camp born June 7, 1953 (age 73)
- Christa Campbell born December 7, 1972 (age 53)
- Danielle Campbell born January 30, 1995 (age 31)
- Maia Campbell born November 26, 1976 (age 49)
- Tisha Campbell born October 13, 1968 (age 58)
- Maria Canals-Barrera born September 28, 1966 (age 60)
- Dyan Cannon born January 4, 1937 (age 89)
- Judy Canova 1913–1983
- Kylie Cantrall born June 25, 2005 (age 21)
- Francesca Capaldi born June 8, 2004 (age 22)
- Lizzy Caplan born June 30, 1982 (age 44)
- Jessica Capshaw born August 9, 1976 (age 50)
- Kate Capshaw born November 3, 1953 (age 73)
- Irene Cara 1959–2022
- Gina Carano born April 16, 1982 (age 44)
- Kathryn Card 1892–1964
- Linda Cardellini born June 25, 1975 (age 51)
- Clare Carey born June 11, 1967 (age 59) (born in Rhodesia)
- Mariah Carey born March 27, 1969 (age 57)
- Lynn Carlin born January 31, 1938 (age 88)
- Kitty Carlisle 1910–2007
- Amy Carlson born July 7, 1968 (age 58)
- Kelly Carlson born February 17, 1976 (age 50)
- Jeanne Carmen 1930–2007
- Julie Carmen born April 4, 1954 (age 72)
- Sue Carol 1906–1982
- Charisma Carpenter born July 23, 1970 (age 56)
- Jennifer Carpenter born December 7, 1979 (age 46)
- Sabrina Carpenter born May 11, 1999 (age 27)
- Charmian Carr 1942-2016
- Ever Carradine born August 6, 1974 (age 52)
- Barbara Carrera born December 31, 1945 (age 80) or 1944, or 1946, or 1951 (born in Nicaragua)
- Tia Carrere born January 2, 1967 (age 59)
- Diahann Carroll 1935–2019
- Madeline Carroll born March 18, 1996 (age 30)
- Nancy Carroll 1903–1965
- Pat Carroll 1927–2022
- Blue Ivy Carter born January 7, 2012 (age 14)
- Dixie Carter 1939–2010
- Lynda Carter born July 24, 1951 (age 75)
- Gabrielle Carteris born January 2, 1961 (age 65)
- Angela Cartwright born September 9, 1952 (age 74) (English-born)
- Veronica Cartwright born April 20, 1949 (age 77) (British-born)
- Adriana Caselotti 1916-1997
- Rosalind Cash 1938–1995
- Peggy Cass 1924–1999
- Joanna Cassidy born August 2, 1945 (age 81)
- Katie Cassidy born November 25, 1986 (age 39)
- Peggie Castle 1927–1973
- Shanley Caswell born December 3, 1991 (age 34)
- Phoebe Cates born July 16, 1963 (age 63)
- Kim Cattrall born August 21, 1956 (age 70) (British-born)
- Jessica Cauffiel born March 30, 1976 (age 50)
- Emma Caulfield born April 8, 1973 (age 53)
- Joan Caulfield 1922–1991
- Kristin Cavallari born January 5, 1987 (age 39)
- Eva Ceja born December 23, 1983 (age 42)
- Lacey Chabert born September 30, 1982 (age 44)
- Faune Chambers born September 23, 1976 (age 50)
- Carol Channing 1921–2019
- Stockard Channing born February 13, 1944 (age 82)
- Rosalind Chao born September 23, 1957 (age 69)
- Cyd Charisse 1922–2008
- Annette Charles 1948–2011
- Daveigh Chase 1990–2026
- Jessica Chastain born March 24, 1977 (age 49)
- Ruth Chatterton 1892–1961
- Molly Cheek born March 2, 1950 (age 76)
- Kristin Chenoweth born July 24, 1968 (age 58)
- Cher born May 20, 1946 (age 80)
- Vanessa Lee Chester born July 2, 1984 (age 42)
- Lois Chiles born April 15, 1947 (age 79)
- Anna Chlumsky born December 3, 1980 (age 45)
- Margaret Cho born December 5, 1968 (age 57)
- Erika Christensen born August 19, 1982 (age 44)
- Claudia Christian born August 10, 1965 (age 61)
- Jamie Chung born April 10, 1983 (age 43)
- Marguerite Churchill 1910–2000
- Ciara born October 25, 1985 (age 41)
- Candy Clark born June 20, 1947 (age 79)
- Priyanka Chopra born July 18, 1982 (age 44)
- Judy Clark 1924–2002
- Melinda Clarke born April 24, 1969 (age 57)
- Sarah Clarke born February 16, 1972 (age 54)
- Patricia Clarkson born December 29, 1959 (age 66)
- Jill Clayburgh 1944–2010
- Kiersey Clemons born December 17, 1993 (age 32)
- Colleen Clinkenbeard born April 13, 1980 (age 46)
- Rosemary Clooney 1928–2002
- Glenn Close born March 19, 1947 (age 79)
- Imogene Coca 1908–2001
- Annalisa Cochrane born June 21, 1996 (age 30)
- Lauren Cohan born January 7, 1982 (age 44) (British-born)
- Lynn Cohen 1933–2020
- Mindy Cohn born May 20, 1966 (age 60)
- Claudette Colbert 1903–1996
- Taylor Cole born April 29, 1984 (age 42)
- Tina Cole born August 4, 1943 (age 83)
- Chloe Coleman born November 23, 2008 (age 17)
- Holliston Coleman born June 30, 1992 (age 34)
- Monique Coleman born November 13, 1980 (age 45)
- Kim Coles born January 11, 1962 (age 64)
- Patricia Collinge 1892–1974
- Lily Collins born March 18, 1989 (age 37) (British-American)
- Lynn Collins born May 16, 1977 (age 49)
- Holly Marie Combs born December 3, 1973 (age 52)
- Anjanette Comer 1939–2026
- Dorothy Comingore 1913–1971
- Betty Compson 1897–1974
- Mattea Conforti born May 22, 2006 (age 20)
- Michaela Conlin born June 9, 1978 (age 48)
- Jennifer Connelly born December 12, 1970 (age 55)
- Kristen Connolly born July 12, 1980 (age 46)
- Carole Cook 1924–2023
- Rachael Leigh Cook born October 4, 1979 (age 47)
- Jennifer Coolidge born August 28, 1961 (age 65)
- Calico Cooper born May 19, 1981 (age 45)
- Ellen Corby 1911–1999
- Mara Corday 1930-2025
- Didi Conn born July 13, 1951 (age 75)
- Maddie Corman born August 15, 1970 (age 56)
- Carrie Coon born January 24, 1981 (age 45)
- Miranda Cosgrove born May 14, 1993 (age 33)
- Mary Costa born April 5, 1930 (age 96)
- Dolores Costello 1903–1979
- Stephanie Courtney born February 8, 1970 (age 56)
- Jane Cowl 1883–1950
- Courteney Cox born June 15, 1964 (age 62)
- Laverne Cox born May 29, 1972 (age 54)
- Nikki Cox born June 2, 1978 (age 48)
- Carolyn Craig 1934–1970
- Yvonne Craig 1937–2015
- Jeanne Crain 1925–2003
- Barbara Crampton born December 27, 1958 (age 67)
- Norma Crane 1928–1973
- Joan Crawford c. 1904–1977
- Cathy Lee Crosby born December 2, 1944 (age 81)
- Denise Crosby born November 24, 1957 (age 68)
- Mary Crosby born September 14, 1959 (age 67)
- Marcia Cross born March 25, 1962 (age 64)
- Lindsay Crouse born May 12, 1948 (age 78)
- Gia Crovatin born November 30, 1985 (age 40)
- Suzanne Cryer born January 13, 1967 (age 59)
- Olivia Culpo born May 8, 1992 (age 34)
- Constance Cummings 1910–2005
- Erin Cummings born July 19, 1977 (age 49)
- Quinn Cummings born August 13, 1967 (age 59)
- Kaley Cuoco born November 30, 1985 (age 40)
- Jane Curtin born September 6, 1947 (age 79)
- Jamie Lee Curtis born November 22, 1958 (age 67)
- Ann Cusack born May 22, 1961 (age 65)
- Joan Cusack born October 11, 1962 (age 64)
- Tawny Cypress born August 8, 1976 (age 50)
- Miley Cyrus born November 23, 1992 (age 33)

== D ==
- Caroline D'Amore born June 9, 1984 (age 42)
- Beverly D'Angelo born November 15, 1951 (age 74)
- Patti D'Arbanville born May 25, 1951 (age 75)
- Donna D'Errico born March 30, 1968 (age 58)
- Shae D'lyn born November 24, 1963 (age 62)
- Yaya DaCosta born November 15, 1982 (age 43)
- Alexandra Daddario born March 16, 1986 (age 40)
- Arlene Dahl 1925–2021
- Irene Dailey 1920–2008
- E. G. Daily born September 11, 1961 (age 65)
- Nadia Dajani born October 26, 1965 (age 61)
- Abby Dalton 1932–2020
- Tyne Daly born February 21, 1946 (age 80)
- Gwen Van Dam 1928–2024
- Dorothy Dandridge 1922–1965
- Claire Danes born April 12, 1979 (age 47)
- Shera Danese born October 9, 1949 (age 77)
- Brittany Daniel born March 17, 1976 (age 50)
- Bebe Daniels 1901–1971
- Erin Daniels born October 9, 1973 (age 53)
- Sarah E. Daniels born August 1, 1989 (age 37)
- Blythe Danner born February 3, 1943 (age 83)
- Candy Darling 1944–1974
- Linda Darnell 1923–1965
- Lisa Darr born April 21, 1963 (age 63)
- Jane Darwell 1879–1967
- Stacey Dash born January 20, 1967 (age 59)
- Alexa Davalos born May 28, 1982 (age 44)
- Amy Davidson born September 15, 1979 (age 47)
- Ann B. Davis 1926–2014
- Bette Davis 1908–1989
- Carole Davis born February 17, 1958 (age 68)
- Dana Davis born October 4, 1978 (age 48)
- Geena Davis born January 21, 1956 (age 70)
- Hope Davis born March 23, 1964 (age 62)
- Josie Davis born January 16, 1973 (age 53)
- Kristin Davis born February 23, 1965 (age 61)
- Phyllis Davis 1940–2013
- Viola Davis born August 11, 1965 (age 61)
- Embeth Davidtz born August 11, 1965 (age 61)
- Pam Dawber born October 18, 1951 (age 75)
- Rosario Dawson born May 9, 1979 (age 47)
- Roxann Dawson born September 11, 1958 (age 68)
- Doris Day 1922–2019
- Felicia Day born June 28, 1979 (age 47)
- Marceline Day 1908–2000
- Priscilla Dean 1896–1987
- Rosemary DeCamp 1910–2001
- Yvonne De Carlo 1922–2007
- Brooklyn Decker born April 12, 1987 (age 39)
- Frances Dee 1909–2004
- Ruby Dee 1922–2014
- Sandra Dee 1942–2005
- Kaylee DeFer born September 23, 1986 (age 40)
- Ellen DeGeneres born January 26, 1958 (age 68)
- Gloria DeHaven 1925–2016
- Olivia de Havilland 1916–2020
- Nicole DeHuff 1975–2005
- Wanda De Jesus born August 26, 1958 (age 68)
- Paz de la Huerta born September 3, 1984 (age 42)
- Dolores del Río 1904-1983 (Mexican-born)
- Allie DeBerry born October 26, 1994 (age 32)
- Kate del Castillo born October 23, 1972 (age 54) (Mexican-born)
- Kim Delaney born November 29, 1961 (age 64)
- Diane Delano 1957-2024
- Dana Delany born March 13, 1956 (age 70)
- Idalis DeLeón born June 15, 1969 (age 57)
- Grey DeLisle born August 24, 1973 (age 53)
- Alycia Delmore born October 4, 1977 (age 49)
- Julie Delpy born December 21, 1969 (age 56) (French-born)
- Drea de Matteo born January 19, 1972 (age 54)
- Rebecca De Mornay born August 29, 1959 (age 67)
- Carol Dempster 1901–1991
- Lori Beth Denberg born February 2, 1976 (age 50)
- Kat Dennings born June 13, 1986 (age 40)
- Sandy Dennis 1937–1992
- Bo Derek born November 20, 1956 (age 69)
- Laura Dern born February 10, 1967 (age 59)
- Portia de Rossi born January 31, 1973 (age 53) (Australian-born)
- Donna D'Errico born March 30, 1968 (age 58)
- Melissa De Sousa born September 25, 1967 (age 59)
- Emily Deschanel born October 11, 1976 (age 50)
- Mary Jo Deschanel born November 25, 1945 (age 80)
- Zooey Deschanel born January 17, 1980 (age 46)
- Amanda Detmer born September 27, 1971 (age 55)
- Madelyn Deutch born March 23, 1991 (age 35)
- Zoey Deutch born November 10, 1994 (age 31)
- Patti Deutsch 1943–2017
- Kaitlyn Dever born December 21, 1996 (age 29)
- Loretta Devine born August 21, 1949 (age 77)
- Torrey DeVitto born June 8, 1984 (age 42)
- Jenna Dewan born December 3, 1980 (age 45)
- Joyce DeWitt born April 23, 1949 (age 77)
- Rosemarie DeWitt born October 26, 1971 (age 55)
- Noureen DeWulf born February 28, 1984 (age 42)
- Susan Dey born December 10, 1952 (age 73)
- Alyssa Diaz born September 7, 1985 (age 41)
- Cameron Diaz born August 30, 1972 (age 54)
- Melonie Diaz born April 25, 1984 (age 42)
- Kim Dickens born June 18, 1965 (age 61)
- Angie Dickinson born September 30, 1931 (age 95)
- Marlene Dietrich 1901–1992
- Victoria Dillard born September 20, 1969 (age 57)
- Phyllis Diller 1917–2012
- Melinda Dillon 1939–2023
- Mia Dillon born July 9, 1955 (age 71)
- Jean Dixon 1893-1981
- Donna Dixon born July 20, 1957 (age 69)
- Maria Dizzia born December 29, 1974 (age 51)
- Megan Dodds born September 20, 1970 (age 56)
- Shannen Doherty 1971–2024
- Ami Dolenz born January 8, 1969 (age 57)
- Dagmara Dominczyk born July 17, 1976 (age 50) (born in Poland)
- Elinor Donahue born April 19, 1937 (age 89)
- Jocelin Donahue born November 8, 1981 (age 45)
- Juliet Donenfeld born December 31, 2009 (age 16)
- Elisa Donovan born February 3, 1971 (age 55)
- Ann Doran 1911-2000
- Kerris Dorsey born January 9, 1998 (age 28)
- Kaitlin Doubleday born July 19, 1984 (age 42)
- Portia Doubleday born June 22, 1988 (age 38)
- Donna Douglas 1932–2015
- Illeana Douglas born July 25, 1965 (age 61)
- Suzzanne Douglas 1957–2021
- Robyn Douglass born June 21, 1953 (age 73) (born in Japan)
- Fiona Dourif born October 30, 1981 (age 45)
- Billie Dove 1903–1997
- Ann Dowd born January 30, 1956 (age 70)
- Doris Dowling 1923–2004
- Denise Dowse 1958–2022
- Polly Draper born June 15, 1955 (age 71)
- Rachel Dratch born February 22, 1966 (age 60)
- Fran Drescher born September 30, 1957 (age 69)
- Louise Dresser 1878–1965
- Marie Dressler 1868–1934
- Ellen Drew 1915–2003
- Minnie Driver born January 31, 1970 (age 56) (British-born)
- Joanne Dru 1922–1996
- Alice Drummond 1928–2016
- Ja'Net DuBois 1932–2020
- Heather Dubrow born January 6, 1969 (age 57)
- Anne Dudek born March 22, 1975 (age 51)
- Haylie Duff born February 19, 1985 (age 41)
- Hilary Duff born September 28, 1987 (age 39)
- Julia Duffy born June 27, 1951 (age 75)
- Karen Duffy born May 23, 1962 (age 64)
- Olympia Dukakis 1931–2021
- Patty Duke 1946–2016
- Faye Dunaway born January 14, 1941 (age 85)
- Jennifer Dundas born January 14, 1971 (age 55)
- Christine Dunford born December 4, 1968 (age 57)
- Dominique Dunne 1959–1982
- Irene Dunne 1898–1990
- Mildred Dunnock 1901–1991
- Kirsten Dunst born April 30, 1982 (age 44)
- Tiffany Dupont born March 22, 1981 (age 45)
- Eliza Dushku born December 30, 1980 (age 45)
- Clea DuVall born September 25, 1977 (age 49)
- Shelley Duvall 1949–2024
- Ann Dvorak 1911–1979
- Natalia Dyer born January 13, 1995 (age 31)
- Alexis Dziena born July 8, 1984 (age 42)

== E ==
- Jeanne Eagels 1890–1929
- Bobbie Eakes born July 25, 1961 (age 65)
- Leslie Easterbrook born July 29, 1949 (age 77)
- Alison Eastwood born May 22, 1972 (age 54)
- Mary Eaton 1901–1948
- Christine Ebersole born February 21, 1953 (age 73)
- Sonya Eddy 1967–2022
- Ayo Edebiri born October 3, 1995 (age 31)
- Lisa Edelstein born May 21, 1966 (age 60)
- Barbara Eden born August 23, 1931 (age 95)
- Penny Edwards 1928–1998
- Melissa Claire Egan born September 28, 1981 (age 45)
- Nicole Eggert born January 13, 1972 (age 54)
- Jennifer Ehle born December 29, 1969 (age 56)
- Lisa Eilbacher born May 5, 1956 (age 70) (born in Saudi Arabia)
- Jill Eikenberry born January 21, 1947 (age 79)
- Hallie Eisenberg born August 2, 1992 (age 34)
- Carmen Electra born April 20, 1972 (age 54)
- Erika Eleniak born September 29, 1969 (age 57)
- Jenna Elfman born September 30, 1971 (age 55)
- Kimberly Elise born April 17, 1967 (age 59)
- Shannon Elizabeth born September 7, 1973 (age 53)
- Vera-Ellen 1921–1981
- Jane Elliot born January 17, 1947 (age 79)
- Patricia Elliott 1938–2015
- Aunjanue Ellis born February 21, 1969 (age 57)
- Fern Emmett 1896–1946
- Georgia Engel 1948–2019
- Molly Ephraim born May 22, 1986 (age 40)
- Shareeka Epps born July 11, 1989 (age 37)
- Kathryn Erbe born July 5, 1965 (age 61)
- Jennifer Esposito born April 11, 1973 (age 53)
- Susie Essman born May 31, 1955 (age 71)
- Scarlett Estevez born December 4, 2007 (age 18)
- Estelle Evans 1906–1985
- Judi Evans born July 12, 1964 (age 62)
- Linda Evans born November 18, 1942 (age 83)
- Madge Evans 1909–1981
- Mary Beth Evans born March 7, 1961 (age 65)
- Eve born November 10, 1978 (age 47)
- Angie Everhart born September 7, 1969 (age 57)
- Bridget Everett born April 21, 1972 (age 54)
- Wynn Everett born October 26, 1978 (age 48)
- Briana Evigan born October 23, 1986 (age 40)
- Kayla Ewell born August 27, 1985 (age 41)

== F ==
- Shelley Fabares 1944–2026
- Nanette Fabray 1920–2018
- Morgan Fairchild born February 3, 1950 (age 76)
- Lola Falana born September 11, 1942 (age 84)
- Edie Falco born July 5, 1963 (age 63)
- Siobhan Fallon born May 13, 1961 (age 65)
- Dakota Fanning born February 23, 1994 (age 32)
- Elle Fanning born April 9, 1998 (age 28)
- Anna Faris born November 29, 1976 (age 49)
- Frances Farmer 1913–1970
- Taissa Farmiga born August 17, 1994 (age 32)
- Vera Farmiga born August 6, 1973 (age 53)
- Glenda Farrell 1904–1971
- Sharon Farrell 1940-2023
- Terry Farrell born November 19, 1963 (age 62)
- Mia Farrow born February 9, 1945 (age 81)
- Farrah Fawcett 1947–2009
- Alice Faye 1915–1998
- Barbara Feldon born March 12, 1933 (age 93)
- Tovah Feldshuh born December 27, 1948 (age 77)
- Beanie Feldstein born June 24, 1993 (age 33)
- Sherilyn Fenn born February 1, 1965 (age 61)
- Priah Ferguson born October 1, 2006 (age 20)
- Vanessa Ferlito born December 28, 1977 (age 48)
- Conchata Ferrell 1943–2020
- America Ferrera born April 18, 1984 (age 42)
- Peggy Feury 1924–1985
- Tina Fey born May 18, 1970 (age 56)
- Sally Field born November 6, 1946 (age 80)
- Chip Fields born August 5, 1961 (age 65)
- Holly Fields born October 11, 1976 (age 50)
- Jere Fields born July 2, 1959 (age 67)
- Kim Fields born May 12, 1969 (age 57)
- Hala Finley born May 18, 2009 (age 17)
- Ashley Fink born November 20, 1986 (age 39)
- Linda Fiorentino born March 9, 1958 (age 68)
- Jenna Fischer born March 7, 1974 (age 52)
- Takayo Fischer born November 25, 1932 (age 93)
- Danielle Fishel born May 5, 1981 (age 45)
- Carrie Fisher 1956–2016
- Elsie Fisher born April 3, 2003 (age 23)
- Frances Fisher born May 11, 1952 (age 74) (born in England)
- Joely Fisher born October 29, 1967 (age 59)
- Schuyler Fisk born July 8, 1982 (age 44)
- Fannie Flagg born September 21, 1944 (age 82)
- Jennifer Flavin born August 14, 1968 (age 58)
- Jaqueline Fleming born September 10, 1977 (age 49) (born in Denmark)
- Rhonda Fleming 1923–2020
- Louise Fletcher 1934–2022
- Calista Flockhart born November 11, 1964 (age 61)
- Ann Flood 1932–2022
- Nina Foch 1924–2008
- Megan Follows born March 14, 1968 (age 58) (born in Canada)
- Bridget Fonda born January 27, 1964 (age 62)
- Jane Fonda born December 21, 1937 (age 88)
- Lyndsy Fonseca born January 7, 1987 (age 39)
- Joan Fontaine 1917–2013 (born in Japan)
- Anitra Ford born September 3, 1942 (age 84)
- Constance Ford 1923–1993
- Courtney Ford born June 27, 1978 (age 48)
- Faith Ford born September 14, 1964 (age 62)
- Maria Ford
- Deborah Foreman born October 12, 1962 (age 64)
- Sally Forrest 1928–2015
- Abby Ryder Fortson born March 14, 2008 (age 18)
- Jodie Foster born November 19, 1962 (age 63)
- Kimberly Foster born July 6, 1961 (age 65)
- Meg Foster born May 10, 1948 (age 78)
- Sara Foster born February 5, 1981 (age 45)
- Sutton Foster born March 18, 1975 (age 51)
- Jorja Fox born July 7, 1968 (age 58)
- Megan Fox born May 16, 1986 (age 40)
- Vivica A. Fox born July 30, 1964 (age 62)
- Mackenzie Foy born November 10, 2000 (age 25)
- Anne Francis 1930–2011
- Arlene Francis 1907-2001
- Kay Francis 1905–1968
- Bonnie Franklin 1944–2013
- Diane Franklin born February 11, 1962 (age 64)
- Kathleen Freeman 1923–2001
- Mona Freeman 1926–2014
- Kate French born September 23, 1984 (age 42)
- Lindsay Frost born June 4, 1962 (age 64)
- Soleil Moon Frye born August 6, 1976 (age 50)
- Isabelle Fuhrman born February 25, 1997 (age 29)
- Emma Fuhrmann born September 15, 2001 (age 25)
- Annette Funicello 1942–2013

== G ==
- Eva Gabor 1919–1995 (Hungarian-born)
- Zsa Zsa Gabor 1917–2016 (Hungarian-born)
- Jacqueline Gadsden 1900–1986
- Lady Gaga born March 28, 1986 (age 40)
- June Gale 1911–1996
- Rita Gam 1927–2016
- Aimee Garcia born November 28, 1978 (age 47)
- Ava Gardner 1922-1990
- Virginia Gardner born April 18, 1995 (age 31)
- Beverly Garland 1926–2008
- Judy Garland 1922–1969
- Jennifer Garner born April 17, 1972 (age 54)
- Julia Garner born February 1, 1994 (age 32)
- Kelli Garner born April 11, 1984 (age 42)
- Peggy Ann Garner 1932–1984
- Janeane Garofalo born September 28, 1964 (age 62)
- Teri Garr 1944–2024
- Betty Garrett 1919–2011
- Greer Garson 1904–1996 (British-born)
- Jennie Garth born April 3, 1972 (age 54)
- Ana Gasteyer born May 4, 1967 (age 59)
- Janina Gavankar born November 29, 1980 (age 45)
- Erica Gavin born July 22, 1947 (age 79)
- Rebecca Gayheart born August 12, 1971 (age 55)
- Sami Gayle born January 22, 1996 (age 30)
- Janet Gaynor 1906–1984
- Mitzi Gaynor 1931-2024
- Luella Gear 1897–1980
- Barbara Bel Geddes 1922–2005
- Sarah Michelle Gellar born April 14, 1977 (age 49)
- Gladys George 1904–1954
- Lynda Day George born December 11, 1944 (age 81)
- Melissa George born August 6, 1976 (age 50)
- Lauren German born November 29, 1978 (age 47)
- Gina Gershon born June 10, 1962 (age 64)
- Jami Gertz born October 28, 1965 (age 61)
- Greta Gerwig born August 4, 1983 (age 43)
- Estelle Getty 1923–2008
- Cynthia Gibb born December 14, 1963 (age 62)
- Marla Gibbs born June 14, 1931 (age 95)
- Debbie Gibson born August 31, 1970 (age 56)
- Kelli Giddish born April 13, 1980 (age 46)
- Elaine Giftos born January 24, 1945 (age 81)
- Eugenia Gilbert 1902–1978
- Florence Gilbert 1904–1991
- Helen Gilbert 1915–1995
- Jane Gilbert 1919–2004
- Joanne Gilbert 1932-2025
- Jody Gilbert 1916–1979
- Melissa Gilbert born May 8, 1964 (age 62)
- Mercedes Gilbert 1894–1952
- Sara Gilbert born January 29, 1975 (age 51)
- Sandra Giles 1932–2016
- Elizabeth Gillies born July 26, 1993 (age 33)
- Ann Gillis 1923–2018
- Alexie Gilmore born January 1, 1976 (age 50)
- Peri Gilpin born May 27, 1961 (age 65)
- Annabeth Gish born March 13, 1971 (age 55)
- Dorothy Gish 1898–1968
- Lillian Gish 1893–1993
- Robin Givens born November 27, 1964 (age 61)
- Summer Glau born July 24, 1981 (age 45)
- Lola Glaudini born November 24, 1971 (age 54)
- Ilana Glazer born April 12, 1987 (age 39)
- Lucile Gleason 1888–1947
- Carlin Glynn 1940-2023
- Paulette Goddard 1910–1990
- Angela Goethals born May 20, 1977 (age 49)
- Tracey Gold born May 16, 1969 (age 57)
- Whoopi Goldberg born November 13, 1955 (age 70)
- Gage Golightly born September 5, 1993 (age 33)
- Arlene Golonka 1936–2021
- Minna Gombell 1892–1973
- Selena Gomez born July 22, 1992 (age 34)
- Meagan Good born August 8, 1981 (age 45)
- Ginnifer Goodwin born May 22, 1978 (age 48)
- Lecy Goranson born June 22, 1974 (age 52)
- Pamela Gordon 1937-2003
- Ruth Gordon 1896–1985
- YaYa Gosselin born January 26, 2009 (age 17)
- Alice Ghostley 1923–2007
- Betty Grable 1916–1973
- Maggie Grace born September 21, 1983 (age 43)
- Elle Graham born May 25, 2009 (age 17)
- Heather Graham born January 29, 1970 (age 56)
- Kat Graham born September 5, 1989 (age 37) (Swiss-born)
- Lauren Graham born March 16, 1967 (age 59)
- Gloria Grahame 1923–1981
- Greer Grammer born February 15, 1992 (age 34)
- Ariana Grande born June 26, 1993 (age 33)
- Beth Grant born September 18, 1949 (age 77)
- Brea Grant born October 16, 1981 (age 45)
- Lee Grant born October 31, 1925 (age 101)
- Bonita Granville 1923–1988
- Karen Grassle born February 25, 1942 (age 84)
- Erin Gray born January 7, 1950 (age 76)
- Linda Gray born September 12, 1940 (age 86)
- Ari Graynor born April 27, 1983 (age 43)
- Kathryn Grayson 1922–2010
- Alice Greczyn born February 6, 1986 (age 40)
- Ariana Greenblatt born August 27, 2007 (age 19)
- Charlotte Greenwood 1890–1977
- Virginia Gregg 1916-1986
- Kerri Green born January 14, 1967 (age 59)
- Ashley Greene born February 21, 1987 (age 39)
- Charlotte Greenwood 1890–1977
- Judy Greer born July 20, 1975 (age 51)
- Kim Greist born May 12, 1958 (age 68)
- Jennifer Grey born March 26, 1960 (age 66)
- Virginia Grey 1917–2004
- Pam Grier born May 26, 1949 (age 77)
- Corinne Griffith 1894–1979
- Melanie Griffith born August 9, 1957 (age 69)
- Tracy Griffith born October 19, 1965 (age 61)
- Leslie Grossman born October 25, 1971 (age 55)
- Fiona Gubelmann born March 30, 1980 (age 46)
- Carla Gugino born August 29, 1971 (age 55)
- Ann Morgan Guilbert 1928–2016
- Grace Gummer born May 9, 1986 (age 40)
- Mamie Gummer born August 3, 1983 (age 43)
- Anna Gunn born August 11, 1968 (age 58)
- Danai Gurira born February 14, 1978 (age 48)
- Jasmine Guy born March 10, 1962 (age 64)
- Maggie Gyllenhaal born November 16, 1977 (age 48)

== H ==
- Olivia Hack born June 16, 1983 (age 43)
- Shelley Hack born July 6, 1947 (age 79)
- Joan Hackett 1934–1983
- Martha Hackett born February 21, 1961 (age 65)
- Tiffany Haddish born December 3, 1979 (age 46)
- Julie Anne Haddock born April 3, 1965 (age 61)
- Sara Haden 1899–1981
- Marianne Hagan born December 8, 1966 (age 59)
- Molly Hagan born August 3, 1961 (age 65)
- Jean Hagen 1923–1977
- Uta Hagen 1919–2004 (born in Germany)
- Julie Hagerty born June 15, 1955 (age 71)
- Meredith Hagner born May 31, 1987 (age 39)
- Kathryn Hahn born July 23, 1973 (age 53)
- Nikki Hahn born November 13, 2002 (age 23)
- Stacy Haiduk born April 28, 1968 (age 58)
- Leisha Hailey born July 11, 1971 (age 55) (born in Japan)
- Barbara Hale 1922–2017
- Jennifer Hale born January 1, 1972 (age 54) (Canada-American)
- Lucy Hale born June 14, 1989 (age 37)
- Alaina Reed Hall 1946–2009
- Grayson Hall 1922–1985
- Irma P. Hall born June 3, 1935 (age 91)
- Rebecca Hall born May 3, 1982 (age 44)
- Regina Hall born December 12, 1970 (age 55)
- Florence Halop 1923–1986
- Daria Halprin born December 30, 1948 (age 77)
- Courtney Halverson born June 14, 1989 (age 37)
- Veronica Hamel born November 20, 1943 (age 82)
- Kim Hamilton 1932–2013
- Linda Hamilton born September 26, 1956 (age 70)
- LisaGay Hamilton born March 25, 1964 (age 62)
- Lois Hamilton 1943–1999
- Margaret Hamilton 1902–1985
- Melinda Page Hamilton born August 22, 1974 (age 52)
- Barbara Hancock born November 21, 1949 (age 76)
- Chelsea Handler born February 25, 1975 (age 51)
- Daryl Hannah born December 3, 1960 (age 65)
- Anne Haney 1934–2001
- Alyson Hannigan born March 24, 1974 (age 52)
- Sammi Hanratty born September 20, 1995 (age 31)
- Marcia Gay Harden born August 14, 1959 (age 67)
- Melora Hardin born June 29, 1967 (age 59)
- Ann Harding 1902–1981
- Mariska Hargitay born January 23, 1964 (age 62)
- Jean Harlow 1911–1937
- Angie Harmon born August 10, 1972 (age 54)
- Joy Harmon 1940-2026
- Marie Harmon 1923–2021
- Elisabeth Harnois born May 26, 1979 (age 47)
- Jessica Harper born October 10, 1949 (age 77)
- Tanisha Harper born September 18, 1985 (age 41) (born in Japan)
- Tess Harper born August 15, 1950 (age 76)
- Valerie Harper 1939–2019
- Laura Harring born March 3, 1964 (age 62) (Mexican-born)
- Barbara Harris 1935–2018
- Cynthia Harris 1934–2021
- Danielle Harris born June 1, 1977 (age 49)
- Danneel Harris born March 18, 1979 (age 47)
- Estelle Harris 1928–2022
- Harriet Sansom Harris born January 8, 1955 (age 71)
- Julie Harris 1925–2013
- Mel Harris born July 12, 1956 (age 70)
- Rachael Harris born January 12, 1968 (age 58)
- Jenilee Harrison born June 12, 1958 (age 68)
- Linda Harrison born July 26, 1945 (age 81)
- Kathryn Harrold born August 2, 1950 (age 76)
- Deborah Harry born July 1, 1945 (age 81)
- Margo Harshman born March 4, 1986 (age 40)
- Dolores Hart born October 20, 1938 (age 88)
- Melissa Joan Hart born April 18, 1976 (age 50)
- Mariette Hartley born June 21, 1940 (age 86)
- Elizabeth Hartman 1943–1987
- Lisa Hartman Black born June 1, 1956 (age 70)
- Teri Hatcher born December 8, 1964 (age 61)
- Anne Hathaway born November 12, 1982 (age 43)
- Marcia Haufrecht born January 3, 1937 (age 89)
- Aaliyah Haughton 1979–2001
- Wanda Hawley 1895–1963
- Kali Hawk born October 4, 1986 (age 40)
- Goldie Hawn born November 21, 1945 (age 80)
- Salma Hayek born September 2, 1966 (age 60) (Mexican-born)
- Allison Hayes 1930–1977
- Helen Hayes 1900–1993
- Susan Hayward 1917–1975
- Rita Hayworth 1918–1987
- Glenne Headly 1955–2017
- Shari Headley born July 15, 1964 (age 62)
- Mary Healy 1918–2015
- Amber Heard born April 22, 1986 (age 40)
- Patricia Heaton born March 4, 1958 (age 68)
- Anne Heche 1969–2022
- Jessica Hecht born June 28, 1965 (age 61)
- Eileen Heckart 1919–2001
- Tippi Hedren born January 19, 1930 (age 96)
- Katherine Heigl born November 24, 1978 (age 47)
- Jayne Heitmeyer born October 30, 1960 (age 66) (born in Canada)
- Marg Helgenberger born November 16, 1958 (age 67)
- Katherine Helmond 1929–2019
- Mariel Hemingway born November 22, 1961 (age 64)
- Zulay Henao born May 29, 1979 (age 47) (born in Colombia)
- Florence Henderson 1934–2016
- Marcia Henderson 1929–1987
- Lauri Hendler born April 22, 1965 (age 61)
- Christina Hendricks born May 3, 1975 (age 51) (dual British and American citizenship)
- Elaine Hendrix born December 28, 1970 (age 55)
- Marilu Henner born April 6, 1952 (age 74)
- Shelley Hennig born January 2, 1987 (age 39)
- Linda Kaye Henning born September 16, 1944 (age 82)
- Pamela Hensley born October 3, 1950 (age 76)
- Taraji P. Henson born September 11, 1970 (age 56)
- Natasha Henstridge born August 15, 1974 (age 52) (born in Canada)
- Katharine Hepburn 1907–2003
- Rebecca Herbst born May 12, 1977 (age 49)
- Barbara Hershey born February 5, 1948 (age 78)
- Lori Heuring born April 6, 1973 (age 53) (Panamanian-born)
- Jennifer Love Hewitt born February 21, 1979 (age 47)
- Catherine Hicks born August 6, 1951 (age 75)
- Monique Hicks born December 11, 1967 (age 58)
- Brianna Hildebrand born August 14, 1996 (age 30)
- Marianna Hill born February 9, 1942 (age 84)
- Paris Hilton born February 17, 1981 (age 45)
- Nichole Hiltz born September 3, 1978 (age 48)
- Cheryl Hines born September 21, 1965 (age 61)
- Connie Hines 1931–2009
- Marin Hinkle born March 23, 1966 (age 60) (born in Tanzania)
- Ashley Hinshaw born December 11, 1988 (age 37)
- Judith Hoag born June 28, 1963 (age 63)
- Mitzi Hoag 1932–2019
- Gaby Hoffmann born January 8, 1982 (age 44)
- Brooke Hogan born May 5, 1988 (age 38)
- Alexandra Holden born April 30, 1977 (age 49)
- Laurie Holden born December 17, 1969 (age 56)
- Willa Holland born June 18, 1991 (age 35)
- Judy Holliday 1921–1965
- Polly Holliday 1937–2025
- Laurel Holloman born May 23, 1968 (age 58) or 1971
- Lauren Holly born October 28, 1963 (age 63)
- Celeste Holm 1917–2012
- Katie Holmes born December 18, 1978 (age 47)
- Darla Hood 1931–1979
- Charlene Holt 1928–1996
- Olivia Holt born August 5, 1997 (age 29)
- Miriam Hopkins 1902–1972
- Hedda Hopper 1885–1966
- Cody Horn born June 12, 1988 (age 38)
- Lena Horne 1917–2010
- Julianne Hough born July 20, 1988 (age 38)
- Whitney Houston 1963–2012
- Bryce Dallas Howard born March 2, 1981 (age 45)
- Traylor Howard born June 14, 1966 (age 60)
- Beth Howland 1939–2015
- Kelly Hu born February 13, 1968 (age 58)
- Season Hubley born March 14, 1951 (age 75)
- Vanessa Hudgens born December 14, 1988 (age 37)
- Jennifer Hudson born September 12, 1981 (age 45)
- Haley Hudson born June 14, 1986 (age 40)
- Kate Hudson born April 19, 1979 (age 47)
- Rochelle Hudson 1916–1972
- Felicity Huffman born December 9, 1962 (age 63)
- Kathleen Hughes 1928–2025
- Mary Beth Hughes 1919–1995
- Sharon Hugueny 1944–1996
- Josephine Hull 1877–1957
- Gayle Hunnicutt 1943-2023
- Bonnie Hunt born September 22, 1961 (age 65)
- Helen Hunt born June 15, 1963 (age 63)
- Linda Hunt born April 2, 1945 (age 81)
- Marsha Hunt 1917–2022
- Holly Hunter born March 20, 1958 (age 68)
- Kaki Hunter born November 6, 1955 (age 71)
- Kim Hunter 1922–2002
- Melody Hurd born October 30, 2011 (age 15)
- Mary Beth Hurt 1946–2026
- Ruth Hussey 1911–2005
- Anjelica Huston born July 8, 1951 (age 75)
- Josephine Hutchinson 1903–1998
- Gunilla Hutton born May 15, 1944 (age 82) (Swedish-born)
- Lauren Hutton born November 17, 1943 (age 82)
- Martha Hyer 1924–2014
- Sarah Hyland born November 24, 1990 (age 35)
- Joyce Hyser born December 20, 1957 (age 68)

== I ==
- Laura Innes born August 16, 1957 (age 69)
- Jill Ireland 1936-1990 (British-born)
- Kathy Ireland born March 20, 1963 (age 63)
- Marin Ireland born August 30, 1979 (age 47)
- Amy Irving born September 10, 1953 (age 73)
- Judith Ivey born September 4, 1951 (age 75)

== J ==
- Janet Jackson born May 16, 1966 (age 60)
- Kate Jackson born October 29, 1948 (age 78)
- Shar Jackson born August 31, 1976 (age 50)
- Sherry Jackson born February 15, 1942 (age 84)
- Skai Jackson born April 8, 2002 (age 24)
- Victoria Jackson born August 2, 1959 (age 67)
- Gillian Jacobs born October 19, 1982 (age 44)
- Lexi Janicek born August 19, 2011 (age 15)
- Allison Janney born November 19, 1959 (age 66)
- Anne Jeffreys 1923–2017
- Mia Sinclair Jenness born December 14, 2005 (age 20)
- Claudia Jennings 1949–1979
- Scarlett Johansson born November 22, 1984 (age 41)
- Amy Jo Johnson born October 6, 1970 (age 56)
- Anne-Marie Johnson born July 18, 1960 (age 66)
- Ashley Johnson born August 9, 1983 (age 43)
- Dakota Johnson born October 4, 1989 (age 37)
- Kendra C. Johnson born December 26, 1976 (age 49)
- Kristen Johnston born September 20, 1967 (age 59)
- Lynn-Holly Johnson born December 13, 1958 (age 67)
- Rita Johnson 1913–1965
- Sandy Johnson born July 7, 1954 (age 72)
- JoJo born December 20, 1990 (age 35)
- Angelina Jolie born June 4, 1975 (age 51)
- Anissa Jones 1958–1976
- Carolyn Jones 1930–1983
- Cherry Jones born November 21, 1956 (age 69)
- Janet Jones born January 10, 1961 (age 65)
- January Jones born January 5, 1978 (age 48)
- Jasmine Cephas Jones born July 21, 1989 (age 37)
- Jennifer Jones 1919–2009
- Jill Marie Jones born January 4, 1975 (age 51)
- Marcia Mae Jones 1924–2007
- Rashida Jones born February 25, 1976 (age 50)
- Renée Jones born October 15, 1958 (age 68)
- Shirley Jones born March 31, 1934 (age 92)
- Tamala Jones born November 12, 1974 (age 51)
- Dorothy Jordan 1906–1988
- Olivia Jordan born September 28, 1988 (age 38)
- Jackie Joseph born November 7, 1933 (age 93)
- Milla Jovovich born December 17, 1975 (age 50)
- Leatrice Joy 1893–1985
- Elaine Joyce born December 19, 1945 (age 80)
- Ella Joyce born June 12, 1954 (age 72)
- Ashley Judd born April 19, 1968 (age 58)
- Victoria Justice born February 19, 1993 (age 33)

== K ==
- Jane Kaczmarek born December 21, 1955 (age 70)
- Qurrat Ann Kadwani born May 10, 1981 (age 45)
- Madeline Kahn 1942–1999
- Bianca Kajlich born March 26, 1977 (age 49)
- Mindy Kaling born June 24, 1979 (age 47)
- Elena Kampouris born September 16, 1997 (age 29)
- Melina Kanakaredes born April 23, 1967 (age 59)
- Carol Kane born June 18, 1952 (age 74)
- Chelsea Kane born September 15, 1988 (age 38)
- Nicole Kang born June 30, 1993 (age 33)
- Mitzi Kapture born May 2, 1962 (age 64)
- Kym Karath born August 4, 1958 (age 68)
- Kathryn Kates 1948–2022
- Julie Kavner born September 7, 1950 (age 76)
- Celia Kaye born February 24, 1942 (age 84)
- Lainie Kazan born May 15, 1940 (age 86)
- Maia Kealoha December 15, 2016 (age 9)
- Jane Kean 1923–2013
- Staci Keanan born June 6, 1975 (age 51)
- Diane Keaton 1946–2025
- Arielle Kebbel born February 19, 1985 (age 41)
- Monica Keena born May 28, 1979 (age 47)
- Catherine Keener born March 23, 1959 (age 67)
- Sally Kellerman 1937–2022
- Sheila Kelley born October 9, 1961 (age 65)
- Catherine Kellner born October 2, 1970 (age 56)
- Grace Kelly 1929–1982
- Jean Louisa Kelly born March 9, 1972 (age 54)
- Lisa Robin Kelly 1970–2013
- Minka Kelly born June 24, 1980 (age 46)
- Moira Kelly born March 6, 1968 (age 58)
- Nancy Kelly 1921–1995
- Patsy Kelly 1910–1981
- Paula Kelly 1943–2020
- Anna Kendrick born August 9, 1985 (age 41)
- Kyla Kenedy born February 4, 2003 (age 23)
- Barbara Kent 1907–2011
- Riley Keough born May 29, 1989 (age 37)
- Joanna Kerns born February 12, 1953 (age 73)
- Sandra Kerns born July 20, 1949 (age 77)
- Alicia Keys born January 25, 1981 (age 45)
- Margot Kidder 1948–2018
- Nicole Kidman born June 20, 1967 (age 59) (dual Australian and American citizenship)
- Laura Kightlinger born June 13, 1964 (age 62) or 1969
- Adrienne King born July 21, 1955 (age 71) or 1960
- Aja Naomi King born January 11, 1985 (age 41)
- Jaime King born April 23, 1979 (age 47)
- Joey King born July 30, 1999 (age 27)
- Kent King born August 5, 1974 (age 52)
- Regina King born January 15, 1971 (age 55)
- Phyllis Kirk 1927–2006
- Jemima Kirke born April 26, 1985 (age 41) (English-born)
- Lola Kirke born September 27, 1990 (age 36) (English-born)
- Sally Kirkland 1941–2025
- Tawny Kitaen 1961–2021
- Eartha Kitt 1927–2008
- Hayley Kiyoko born April 3, 1991 (age 35)
- Alexis Knapp born July 31, 1989 (age 37)
- Karen Kopins born October 10, 1961 (age 65)
- Gladys Knight born May 28, 1944 (age 82)
- Shirley Knight 1936–2020
- Keshia Knight Pulliam born April 9, 1979 (age 47)
- Beyoncé Knowles born September 4, 1981 (age 45)
- Solange Knowles born June 24, 1986 (age 40)
- Susan Kohner born November 11, 1936 (age 89)
- Karen Kopins born October 10, 1961 (age 65)
- Liza Koshy born March 31, 1996 (age 30)
- Nancy Kovack born March 11, 1936 (age 90)
- Linda Kozlowski born January 7, 1958 (age 68)
- Jane Krakowski born October 11, 1968 (age 58)
- Clare Kramer born September 3, 1974 (age 52)
- Louisa Krause born May 20, 1986 (age 40)
- Zoë Kravitz born December 1, 1988 (age 37)
- Lisa Kudrow born July 30, 1963 (age 63)
- Mila Kunis born August 14, 1983 (age 43) (born in Ukraine)
- Swoosie Kurtz born September 6, 1944 (age 82)
- Nancy Kwan born May 19, 1939 (age 87) (born in Hong Kong)

== L ==
- Patti Labelle born May 24, 1944 (age 82)
- Eva LaRue born December 27, 1966 (age 59)
- Vanessa Lachey born November 9, 1980 (age 45)
- Cheryl Ladd born July 12, 1951 (age 75)
- Diane Ladd 1935–2025
- Christine Lahti born April 4, 1950 (age 76)
- Sanoe Lake born May 19, 1982 (age 44) or 1979
- Ricki Lake born September 21, 1968 (age 58)
- Veronica Lake 1922–1973
- Christine Lakin born January 25, 1979 (age 47)
- Hedy Lamarr 1914–2000 (born in Austria)
- Dorothy Lamour 1914–1996
- Sarah Lancaster born February 12, 1980 (age 46)
- Juliet Landau born March 30, 1965 (age 61)
- Amy Landecker born September 30, 1969 (age 57)
- Ricki Noel Lander born December 14, 1979 (age 46)
- Audrey Landers born July 18, 1956 (age 70)
- Judy Landers born October 7, 1958 (age 68)
- Carole Landis 1919–1948
- Jessie Royce Landis 1896–1972
- June Lang 1917–2005
- Diane Lane born January 22, 1965 (age 61)
- Priscilla Lane 1915–1995
- Sasha Lane born September 29, 1995 (age 31)
- Hope Lange 1933–2003
- Jessica Lange born April 20, 1949 (age 77)
- Heather Langenkamp born July 17, 1964 (age 62)
- A. J. Langer born May 22, 1974 (age 52)
- Brooke Langton born November 27, 1970 (age 55)
- Angela Lansbury 1925–2022 (British-born)
- Joi Lansing 1929–1972
- Liza Lapira born December 3, 1981 (age 44)
- Brie Larson born October 1, 1989 (age 37)
- Ali Larter born February 28, 1976 (age 50)
- Louise Lasser 1939–2026
- Louise Latham 1922–2018
- Sanaa Lathan born September 19, 1971 (age 55)
- Queen Latifah born March 18, 1970 (age 56)
- Ashley Laurence born May 28, 1966 (age 60)
- Oona Laurence born August 1, 2002 (age 24)
- Piper Laurie 1932–2023
- Linda Lavin 1937–2024
- Barbara Lawrence 1930–2013
- Jennifer Lawrence born August 15, 1990 (age 36)
- Vicki Lawrence born March 26, 1949 (age 77)
- Bianca Lawson born March 20, 1979 (age 47)
- Jayme Lawson born September 19, 1997 (age 29)
- Maggie Lawson born August 12, 1980 (age 46)
- Maya Le Clark born March 28, 2011 (age 15)
- Nicole Leach born May 10, 1979 (age 47)
- Cloris Leachman 1926–2021
- Sharon Leal born October 17, 1972 (age 54)
- Michael Learned born April 9, 1939 (age 87)
- Kelly Le Brock born March 24, 1960 (age 66)
- Gwen Lee 1904–1961
- Gypsy Rose Lee 1911–1970
- Michele Lee born June 24, 1942 (age 84)
- Peggy Lee 1920–2002
- Peyton Elizabeth Lee born May 22, 2004 (age 22)
- Robinne Lee born July 16, 1974 (age 52)
- Sheryl Lee born April 22, 1967 (age 59) (born in Germany)
- Sondra Lee 1928-2026
- Cassandra Lee Morris born April 19, 1982 (age 44)
- Andrea Leeds 1914–1984
- Erica Leerhsen born February 14, 1976 (age 50)
- Hudson Leick born May 9, 1969 (age 57)
- Cherami Leigh born July 19, 1988 (age 38)
- Chyler Leigh born April 10, 1982 (age 44)
- Janet Leigh 1927–2004
- Katie Leigh born December 16, 1958 (age 67)
- Jennifer Jason Leigh born February 5, 1962 (age 64)
- Kasi Lemmons born February 24, 1961 (age 65)
- Bethany Joy Lenz born April 2, 1981 (age 45)
- Kay Lenz born March 4, 1953 (age 73)
- Melissa Leo born September 14, 1960 (age 66)
- Téa Leoni born February 25, 1966 (age 60)
- Joan Leslie 1925–2015
- Margarita Levieva born February 9, 1980 (age 46) (born in Russia)
- Jenifer Lewis born January 25, 1957 (age 69)
- Juliette Lewis born June 21, 1973 (age 53)
- Vicki Lewis born March 17, 1960 (age 66)
- Ashley Liao born October 21, 2001 (age 25)
- Liana Liberato born August 20, 1995 (age 31)
- Jennifer Lien born August 24, 1974 (age 52)
- Judith Light born February 9, 1949 (age 77)
- Morgan Lily born April 11, 2000 (age 26)
- Sophia Lillis born February 13, 2002 (age 24)
- Yvonne Lime 1935–2026
- Abbey Lincoln 1930–2010
- Emily Alyn Lind born May 6, 2002 (age 24)
- Riki Lindhome born March 5, 1979 (age 47)
- Margaret Lindsay 1910–1981
- Bai Ling born October 10, 1966 (age 60) (Chinese-born)
- Laura Linney born February 5, 1964 (age 62)
- Peggy Lipton 1946–2019
- Peyton List born August 8, 1986 (age 40)
- Peyton List born April 6, 1998 (age 28)
- Zoe Lister-Jones born September 1, 1982 (age 44)
- Lucy Liu born December 2, 1968 (age 57)
- Blake Lively born August 25, 1987 (age 39)
- Sabrina Lloyd born November 20, 1970 (age 55)
- Amy Locane born December 19, 1971 (age 54)
- Sondra Locke 1944–2018
- Spencer Locke born September 20, 1991 (age 35)
- Tammy Locke born September 19, 1959 (age 67)
- Tembi Locke born July 26, 1970 (age 56)
- Anne Lockhart born September 6, 1953 (age 73)
- June Lockhart 1925–2025
- Heather Locklear born September 25, 1961 (age 65)
- Lindsay Lohan born July 2, 1986 (age 40)
- Alison Lohman born September 18, 1979 (age 47)
- Kristanna Loken born October 8, 1979 (age 47)
- Carole Lombard 1908–1942
- Karina Lombard born January 21, 1969 (age 57)
- Julie London 1926–2000
- Lauren London born December 5, 1984 (age 41)
- Nia Long born October 30, 1970 (age 56)
- Shelley Long born August 23, 1949 (age 77)
- Eva Longoria born March 15, 1975 (age 51)
- Jennifer Lopez born July 24, 1969 (age 57)
- Traci Lords born May 7, 1968 (age 58)
- Josie Loren born March 19, 1987 (age 39)
- Joan Lorring 1926–2014
- Caity Lotz born December 30, 1986 (age 39)
- Lori Loughlin born July 28, 1964 (age 62)
- Julia Louis-Dreyfus born January 13, 1961 (age 65)
- Anita Louise 1915–1970
- Tina Louise born February 11, 1934 (age 92)
- Billie Lourd born July 17, 1992 (age 34)
- Bessie Love 1898–1986
- Courtney Love born July 9, 1964 (age 62)
- Carey Lowell born February 11, 1961 (age 65)
- Myrna Loy 1905–1993
- Olivia Luccardi born May 17, 1989 (age 37)
- Shannon Lucio born June 25, 1980 (age 46)
- Lorna Luft born November 21, 1952 (age 73)
- Deanna Lund 1937–2018
- Jamie Luner born May 12, 1971 (age 55)
- Ida Lupino 1918–1995 (English-born)
- Patti LuPone born April 21, 1949 (age 77)
- Masiela Lusha born October 23, 1985 (age 41) (Albanian-born)
- Dorothy Lyman born April 18, 1947 (age 79)
- Jane Lynch born July 14, 1960 (age 66)
- Kelly Lynch born January 31, 1959 (age 67)
- Carol Lynley 1942–2019
- Meredith Scott Lynn born March 8, 1970 (age 56)
- Sue Lyon 1946–2019
- Natasha Lyonne born April 4, 1979 (age 47)

== M ==
- Jes Macallan born August 9, 1982 (age 44)
- June MacCloy 1909–2005
- Jeanette MacDonald 1903–1965
- Andie MacDowell born April 21, 1958 (age 68)
- Ali MacGraw born April 1, 1939 (age 87)
- Justina Machado born September 6, 1972 (age 54)
- Allison Mack born July 29, 1982 (born in Germany)
- Dorothy Mackaill 1903–1990
- Joyce MacKenzie 1925–2021
- Shirley MacLaine born April 24, 1934 (age 92)
- Aline MacMahon 1899–1991
- Meredith MacRae 1944–2000
- Amy Madigan born September 11, 1950 (age 76)
- Bailee Madison born October 15, 1999 (age 27)
- Mikey Madison born March 25, 1999 (age 27)
- Madonna born August 16, 1958 (age 68)
- Virginia Madsen born September 11, 1961 (age 65)
- Valerie Mahaffey 1953–2025
- Marjorie Main 1890–1975
- Tina Majorino born February 7, 1985 (age 41)
- Wendy Makkena born October 4, 1958 (age 68)
- Wendie Malick born December 13, 1950 (age 75)
- Dorothy Malone 1925–2018
- Jena Malone born November 21, 1984 (age 41)
- Camryn Manheim born March 8, 1961 (age 65)
- Leslie Mann born March 26, 1972 (age 54)
- Taryn Manning born November 6, 1978 (age 48)
- Dinah Manoff born January 25, 1956 (age 70)
- Jayne Mansfield 1933–1967
- Shaylee Mansfield born April 6, 2009 (age 17)
- Gia Mantegna born April 17, 1990 (age 36)
- Linda Manz 1961–2020
- Adele Mara 1923–2010
- Kate Mara born February 27, 1983 (age 43)
- Rooney Mara born April 17, 1985 (age 41)
- Laura Marano born November 29, 1995 (age 30)
- Vanessa Marano born October 31, 1992 (age 34)
- Jamie Marchi born October 8, 1977 (age 49)
- Vanessa Marcil born October 15, 1968 (age 58)
- Janet Margolin 1943–1993
- Ann-Margret born April 28, 1941 (age 85) (born in Sweden)
- Julianna Margulies born June 8, 1966 (age 60)
- Constance Marie born September 9, 1965 (age 61)
- Rose Marie 1923–2017
- Jodie Markell born April 13, 1959 (age 67)
- Meghan Markle born August 4, 1981 (age 45)
- Brit Marling born August 7, 1982 (age 44)
- Mae Marsh 1894–1968
- Paula Marshall born June 12, 1964 (age 62)
- Penny Marshall 1943–2018
- Andrea Martin born January 15, 1947 (age 79)
- Kellie Martin born October 16, 1975 (age 51)
- Marsai Martin born August 14, 2004 (age 22)
- Mary Martin 1913–1990
- Meaghan Martin born February 17, 1992 (age 34)
- Pamela Sue Martin born January 5, 1953 (age 73)
- Margo Martindale born July 18, 1951 (age 75)
- Natalie Martinez born July 12, 1984 (age 42)
- Marsha Mason born April 3, 1942 (age 84)
- Chase Masterson born February 26, 1963 (age 63)
- Mary Stuart Masterson born June 28, 1966 (age 60)
- Mary Elizabeth Mastrantonio born November 17, 1958 (age 67)
- Samantha Mathis born May 12, 1970 (age 56)
- Marlee Matlin born August 24, 1965 (age 61)
- Marilyn Maxwell 1921–1972
- Elaine May born April 21, 1932 (age 94)
- Virginia Mayo 1920–2005
- Melanie Mayron born October 20, 1952 (age 74)
- Jayma Mays born July 16, 1979 (age 47)
- Tristin Mays born June 10, 1990 (age 36)
- Debi Mazar born August 13, 1964 (age 62)
- Heather Mazur born June 17, 1976 (age 50)
- Monet Mazur born April 17, 1976 (age 50)
- May McAvoy 1899–1984
- Diane McBain 1941–2022
- Mitzi McCall 1930–2024
- Irish McCalla 1928–2002
- Mercedes McCambridge 1916–2004
- Christine Elise McCarthy born February 12, 1965 (age 61)
- Jenny McCarthy born November 1, 1972 (age 54)
- Melissa McCarthy born August 26, 1970 (age 56)
- Cady McClain born October 13, 1969 (age 57)
- China Anne McClain born August 25, 1998 (age 28)
- Sierra McClain born March 16, 1994 (age 32)
- Rue McClanahan 1934–2010
- Edie McClurg born July 23, 1945 (age 81)
- AnnaLynne McCord born July 16, 1987 (age 39)
- Mary McCormack born February 8, 1969 (age 57)
- Patty McCormack born August 21, 1945 (age 81)
- Maureen McCormick born August 5, 1956 (age 70)
- Sierra McCormick born October 28, 1997 (age 29)
- LisaRaye McCoy born September 23, 1967 (age 59)
- Kimberly McCullough born March 5, 1978 (age 48)
- Jennette McCurdy born June 26, 1992 (age 34)
- Hattie McDaniel 1895–1952
- Heather McDonald born June 14, 1970 (age 56)
- Mary McDonnell born April 28, 1952 (age 74)
- Frances McDormand born June 23, 1957 (age 69)
- Reba McEntire born March 28, 1955 (age 71)
- Gates McFadden born March 2, 1949 (age 77)
- Hayley McFarland born March 29, 1991 (age 35)
- Vonetta McGee 1945–2010
- Kelly McGillis born July 9, 1957 (age 69)
- Elizabeth McGovern born July 18, 1961 (age 65)
- Maureen McGovern born July 27, 1949 (age 77)
- Rose McGowan born September 5, 1973 (age 53) (born in Italy)
- Madeleine McGraw born December 22, 2008 (age 17)
- Melinda McGraw born October 25, 1963 (age 63)
- Violet McGraw born April 22, 2011 (age 15)
- Dorothy McGuire 1916–2001
- Kathryn McGuire 1903–1978
- Maeve McGuire born July 24, 1937 (age 89)
- Lonette McKee born July 22, 1954 (age 72)
- Danica McKellar born January 3, 1975 (age 51)
- Nancy McKeon born April 4, 1966 (age 60)
- Nina Mae McKinney 1912–1967
- Wendi McLendon-Covey born October 10, 1969 (age 57)
- Katherine McNamara born November 22, 1995 (age 30)
- Maggie McNamara 1928–1978
- Kristy McNichol born September 11, 1962 (age 64)
- Katharine McPhee born March 25, 1984 (age 42)
- Butterfly McQueen 1911–1995
- Caroline McWilliams 1945–2010
- Meredith MacRae 1944–2000
- Eve McVeagh 1919–1997
- Emily Meade born January 10, 1989 (age 37)
- Anne Meara 1929–2015
- Kay Medford 1914–1980
- Leighton Meester born April 9, 1986 (age 40)
- Tamara Mello born February 22, 1976 (age 50)
- Eva Mendes born March 5, 1974 (age 52)
- Erica Mendez born February 13, 1988 (age 38)
- Bridgit Mendler born December 18, 1992 (age 33)
- Maria Menounos born June 8, 1978 (age 48)
- Idina Menzel born May 30, 1971 (age 55)
- Isabela Merced born July 10, 2001 (age 25)
- Lee Meriwether born May 27, 1935 (age 91)
- Una Merkel 1903–1986
- Ethel Merman 1908–1984
- Theresa Merritt 1922–1998
- Debra Messing born August 15, 1968 (age 58)
- Dina Meyer born December 22, 1968 (age 57)
- AJ Michalka born April 10, 1991 (age 35)
- Aly Michalka born March 25, 1989 (age 37)
- Lea Michele born August 29, 1986 (age 40)
- Bette Midler born December 1, 1945 (age 80)
- Sydney Mikayla born February 1, 2003 (age 23)
- Alyssa Milano born December 19, 1972 (age 53)
- Sylvia Miles 1924–2019
- Vera Miles born August 23, 1930 (age 96)
- Christina Milian born September 26, 1981 (age 45)
- Cristin Milioti born August 16, 1985 (age 41)
- Penelope Milford 1948–2025
- Ivana Miličević born April 26, 1974 (age 52) (born in Yugoslavia)
- Ann Miller 1923–2004
- Christa Miller born May 28, 1964 (age 62)
- Lara Jill Miller born April 20, 1967 (age 59)
- Penelope Ann Miller born January 13, 1964 (age 62)
- Alley Mills born May 9, 1951 (age 75)
- Donna Mills born December 11, 1940 (age 85)
- Yvette Mimieux 1942–2022
- Nicki Minaj born December 8, 1982 (age 43)
- Rachel Miner born July 29, 1980 (age 46)
- Liza Minnelli born March 12, 1946 (age 80)
- Kelly Jo Minter born September 24, 1966 (age 60)
- Beverley Mitchell born January 22, 1981 (age 45)
- Elizabeth Mitchell born March 27, 1970 (age 56)
- Katy Mixon born March 30, 1981 (age 45)
- Mary Ann Mobley 1937–2014
- Katherine Moennig born December 29, 1977 (age 48)
- Gretchen Mol born November 8, 1972 (age 54)
- Taylor Momsen born July 26, 1993 (age 33)
- Michelle Monaghan born March 23, 1976 (age 50)
- Daniella Monet born March 1, 1989 (age 37)
- Mo'Nique born December 11, 1967 (age 58)
- Maika Monroe born May 29, 1993 (age 33)
- Marilyn Monroe 1926–1962
- Meredith Monroe born December 30, 1969 (age 56)
- Doreen Montalvo 1963–2020
- Elizabeth Montgomery 1933–1995
- Demi Moore born November 11, 1962 (age 63)
- Grace Moore 1898–1947
- Joanna Moore 1934–1997
- Juanita Moore 1914–2014
- Julianne Moore born December 3, 1960 (age 65)
- Kenya Moore born January 24, 1971 (age 55)
- Mandy Moore born April 10, 1984 (age 42)
- Mary Tyler Moore 1936–2017
- Terry Moore born January 7, 1929 (age 97)
- Agnes Moorehead 1900–1974
- Natalie Moorhead 1901–1992
- Dolores Moran 1926–1982
- Erin Moran 1960–2017
- Peggy Moran 1918–2002
- Belita Moreno born November 1, 1949 (age 77)
- Rita Moreno born December 11, 1931 (age 94) (born in Puerto Rico)
- Chloë Grace Moretz born February 10, 1997 (age 29)
- Cathy Moriarty born November 29, 1960 (age 65)
- Debbi Morgan born September 20, 1956 (age 70)
- Haviland Morris born September 14, 1959 (age 67)
- Kathryn Morris born January 28, 1969 (age 57)
- Jennifer Morrison born April 12, 1979 (age 47)
- Shelley Morrison 1936–2019
- Elisabeth Moss born July 24, 1982 (age 44)
- Tamera Mowry born July 6, 1978 (age 48) (born in Germany)
- Tia Mowry born July 6, 1978 (age 48) (born in Germany)
- Bridget Moynahan born April 28, 1971 (age 55)
- Annie Mumolo born July 10, 1973 (age 53)
- Liliana Mumy born April 16, 1994 (age 32)
- Diana Muldaur born August 19, 1938 (age 88)
- Kate Mulgrew born April 29, 1955 (age 71)
- Megan Mullally born November 12, 1958 (age 67)
- Olivia Munn born July 3, 1980 (age 46)
- Brittany Murphy 1977–2009
- Edna Murphy 1899-1974
- Donna Murphy born March 7, 1959 (age 67)
- Rosemary Murphy 1925–2014
- Jillian Murray born June 4, 1984 (age 42)

== N ==
- Kathy Najimy born February 6, 1957 (age 69)
- Nita Naldi 1894–1961
- Florence Nash 1888–1950
- Mary Nash 1884-1976
- Mildred Natwick 1905–1994
- Elise Neal born March 14, 1966 (age 60)
- Patricia Neal 1926–2010
- Noel Neill 1920–2016
- Brooklyn Nelson born April 13, 2004 (age 22)
- Kristin Nelson 1945–2018
- Novella Nelson 1938–2017
- Tracy Nelson born October 25, 1963 (age 63)
- Lois Nettleton 1927–2008
- Bebe Neuwirth born December 31, 1958 (age 67)
- Julie Newmar born August 16, 1933 (age 93)
- Kathryn Newton born February 8, 1997 (age 29)
- Barbara Nichols 1928–1976
- Nichelle Nichols 1932–2022
- Rachel Nichols born January 8, 1980 (age 46)
- Julianne Nicholson born July 1, 1971 (age 55)
- Lorraine Nicholson born April 16, 1990 (age 36)
- Cynthia Nixon born April 9, 1966 (age 60)
- Stephanie Niznik 1967–2019
- Maidie Norman 1912–1998
- Mabel Normand 1892–1930
- Sheree North 1932–2005
- Brandy Norwood born February 11, 1979 (age 47)
- Kim Novak born February 13, 1933 (age 93)

== O ==
- Margaret O'Brien born January 15, 1937 (age 89)
- Erin O'Brien-Moore 1902–1979
- Renee O'Connor born February 15, 1971 (age 55)
- Susan Louise O'Connor born March 11, 1975 (age 51)
- Rosie O'Donnell born March 21, 1962 (age 64)
- Brittany O'Grady born June 2, 1996 (age 30)
- Gail O'Grady born January 23, 1963 (age 63)
- Catherine O'Hara 1954-2026 (dual Canadian and American citizenship)
- Maureen O'Hara 1920–2015 (Irish-born)
- Paige O'Hara born May 10, 1956 (age 70)
- Jodi Lyn O'Keefe born October 10, 1978 (age 48)
- Tricia O'Kelley born September 26, 1968 (age 58)
- Tatum O'Neal born November 5, 1963 (age 63)
- Barbara O'Neil 1910–1980
- Jennifer O'Neill born February 20, 1948 (age 78) (born in Brazil)
- Ahna O'Reilly born September 21, 1984 (age 42)
- Maureen O'Sullivan 1911–1998
- Annette O'Toole born April 1, 1952 (age 74)
- Randi Oakes born August 19, 1951 (age 75)
- Jacqueline Obradors born October 6, 1966 (age 60)
- Larisa Oleynik born June 7, 1981 (age 45)
- Susan Oliver 1932–1990
- Ashley Olsen born June 13, 1986 (age 40)
- Elizabeth Olsen born February 16, 1989 (age 37)
- Mary-Kate Olsen born June 13, 1986 (age 40)
- Susan Olsen born August 14, 1961 (age 65)
- Nancy Olson born July 14, 1928 (age 98)
- Olivia Olson born May 21, 1992 (age 34)
- Renee Olstead born June 18, 1989 (age 37)
- Lupe Ontiveros 1942–2012
- Jenna Ortega born September 27, 2002 (age 24)
- Ana Ortiz born January 25, 1971 (age 55)
- Emily Osment born March 10, 1992 (age 34)
- Beth Ostrosky born July 15, 1972 (age 54)
- Cheri Oteri born September 19, 1962 (age 64)
- Park Overall born March 15, 1957 (age 69)
- Kelly Overton born August 28, 1978 (age 48)

== P ==
- Judy Pace born June 15, 1942 (age 84)
- Genevieve Padalecki born January 8, 1981 (age 45)
- Anita Page 1910–2008
- Geraldine Page 1924–1987
- Janis Paige 1922–2024
- Brina Palencia born February 13, 1984 (age 42)
- Adrianne Palicki born May 6, 1983 (age 43)
- Betsy Palmer 1926–2015
- Keke Palmer born August 26, 1993 (age 33)
- Gwyneth Paltrow born September 27, 1972 (age 54)
- Kay Panabaker born May 2, 1990 (age 36)
- Danielle Panabaker born September 19, 1987 (age 39)
- Hayden Panettiere born August 21, 1989 (age 37)
- Annie Parisse born July 31, 1975 (age 51)
- Grace Park born March 14, 1974 (age 52) (Canadian-American)
- Linda Park born July 9, 1978 (age 48) (South-Korean born)
- Eleanor Parker 1922–2013
- Lara Parker 1938-2023
- Mary-Louise Parker born August 2, 1964 (age 62)
- Nicole Ari Parker born October 7, 1970 (age 56)
- Sarah Jessica Parker born March 25, 1965 (age 61)
- Suzy Parker 1932–2003
- Lana Parrilla born July 15, 1977 (age 49)
- Janel Parrish born October 30, 1988 (age 38)
- Leslie Parrish 1935-2025
- Estelle Parsons born November 20, 1927 (age 98)
- Karyn Parsons born October 8, 1966 (age 60)
- Dolly Parton 1946–2026
- Tonye Patano born October 16, 1961 (age 65)
- Gail Patrick 1911-1980
- Luana Patten 1938–1996
- Elizabeth Patterson 1874–1966
- Marnette Patterson born April 26, 1980 (age 46)
- Neva Patterson 1920–2010
- Paula Patton born December 5, 1975 (age 50)
- Alexandra Paul born July 29, 1963 (age 63)
- Sarah Paulson born December 17, 1974 (age 51)
- Sara Paxton born April 25, 1988 (age 38)
- Alice Pearce 1917–1966
- Patricia Pearcy born September 10, 1946 (age 80)
- Nia Peeples born December 10, 1961 (age 64)
- Amanda Peet born January 11, 1972 (age 54)
- Mary Beth Peil born June 25, 1940 (age 86)
- Elizabeth Peña 1959–2014
- Piper Perabo born October 31, 1976 (age 50)
- Clara Perez born April 5, 1981 (age 45) (born in Venezuela)
- Rosie Perez born September 6, 1964 (age 62)
- Elizabeth Perkins born November 18, 1960 (age 65)
- Millie Perkins born May 12, 1936 (age 90)
- Rhea Perlman born March 31, 1948 (age 78)
- Pauley Perrette born March 27, 1969 (age 57)
- Valerie Perrine 1943–2026
- Barbara Perry 1921–2019
- Donna Pescow born March 24, 1954 (age 72)
- Bernadette Peters born February 28, 1948 (age 78)
- Jean Peters 1926–2000
- Susan Peters 1921–1952
- Amanda Peterson 1971–2015
- Cassandra Peterson born September 17, 1951 (age 75)
- Dorothy Peterson 1897–1979
- Valarie Pettiford born July 8, 1960 (age 66)
- Madison Pettis born July 22, 1998 (age 28)
- Lori Petty born October 14, 1963 (age 63)
- Jade Pettyjohn born November 8, 2000 (age 26)
- Dedee Pfeiffer born January 1, 1964 (age 62)
- Michelle Pfeiffer born April 29, 1958 (age 68)
- Jo Ann Pflug born May 2, 1940 (age 86)
- Mary Philbin 1902–1993
- Busy Philipps born June 25, 1979 (age 47)
- Gina Philips born May 10, 1970 (age 56)
- Bijou Phillips born April 1, 1980 (age 46)
- Mackenzie Phillips born November 10, 1959 (age 66)
- Michelle Phillips born June 4, 1944 (age 82)
- Cindy Pickett born April 18, 1947 (age 79)
- Mary Pickford 1892–1979
- Christina Pickles born February 17, 1935 (age 91)
- Molly Picon 1898–1992
- Julie Piekarski born January 2, 1963 (age 63)
- Sasha Pieterse born February 17, 1996 (age 30) (born South African)
- Jada Pinkett Smith born September 18, 1971 (age 55)
- Leah Pipes born August 12, 1988 (age 38)
- Maria Pitillo born January 8, 1966 (age 60)
- Zasu Pitts 1894–1963
- Mary Kay Place born September 23, 1947 (age 79)
- Dana Plato 1964–1999
- Alice Playten 1947–2011
- Aubrey Plaza born June 26, 1984 (age 42)
- Suzanne Pleshette 1937–2008
- Martha Plimpton born November 16, 1970 (age 55)
- Eve Plumb born April 29, 1958 (age 68)
- Amy Poehler born September 16, 1971 (age 55)
- Priscilla Pointer 1924–2025
- Sydney Tamiia Poitier born November 15, 1973 (age 52)
- Lumi Pollack born January 18, 2009 (age 17)
- Teri Polo born June 1, 1969 (age 57)
- Scarlett Pomers born November 28, 1988 (age 37)
- Ellen Pompeo born November 10, 1969 (age 56)
- Alisan Porter born June 20, 1981 (age 45)
- Natalie Portman born June 9, 1981 (age 45)
- Parker Posey born November 8, 1968 (age 58)
- Laura Post born June 23, 1983 (age 43)
- Markie Post 1950–2021
- Monica Potter born June 30, 1971 (age 55)
- Annie Potts born October 28, 1952 (age 74)
- CCH Pounder born December 25, 1952 (age 73) (Guyana-born)
- Phyllis Povah 1893–1975
- Eleanor Powell 1912–1982
- Jane Powell 1929–2021
- Stefanie Powers born November 2, 1942 (age 84)
- Keri Lynn Pratt born September 23, 1978 (age 48)
- Kyla Pratt born September 16, 1986 (age 40)
- Laura Prepon born March 7, 1980 (age 46)
- Paula Prentiss born March 4, 1938 (age 88)
- Jaime Pressly born July 30, 1977 (age 49)
- Carrie Preston born June 21, 1967 (age 59)
- Kelly Preston 1962–2020
- Lindsay Price born December 6, 1976 (age 49)
- Megyn Price born March 24, 1971 (age 55)
- Pat Priest born August 15, 1936 (age 90)
- Brooklynn Prince born May 4, 2010 (age 16)
- Victoria Principal born January 3, 1950 (age 76) (born in Japan)
- Emily Procter born October 8, 1968 (age 58)
- Dorothy Provine 1935–2010
- Florence Pugh born January 3, 1996 (age 30)
- Linda Purl born September 2, 1955 (age 71)
- Haley Pullos, born July 10, 1998 (age 28)
- Missi Pyle born November 16, 1972 (age 53)

== Q ==
- Maggie Q born May 22, 1979 (age 47)
- Margaret Qualley born October 23, 1994 (age 32)
- Rainey Qualley born March 11, 1989 (age 37)
- Kathleen Quinlan born November 19, 1954 (age 71)
- Maeve Quinlan born November 16, 1964 (age 61)
- Aileen Quinn born June 28, 1971 (age 55)
- Molly C. Quinn born October 8, 1993 (age 33)
- Pat Quinn born June 20, 1937 (age 89) (born in Panama)
- Beulah Quo 1923–2002
- Audrey Quock born February 25, 1977 (age 49)

== R ==
- Lexi Rabe born June 15, 2012 (age 14)
- Cassidy Rae born June 7, 1976 (age 50)
- Charlotte Rae 1926–2018
- Cristina Raines born February 28, 1952 (age 74)
- Ella Raines 1920–1988
- Francia Raisa born July 26, 1988 (age 38)
- Mary Lynn Rajskub born June 22, 1971 (age 55)
- Sheryl Lee Ralph born December 30, 1956 (age 69)
- Esther Ralston 1902–1994
- Marjorie Rambeau 1889–1970
- Leven Rambin born May 17, 1990 (age 36)
- Cierra Ramirez born March 9, 1995 (age 31)
- Dania Ramirez born November 8, 1979 (age 47) (Dominican-born)
- Sara Ramirez born August 31, 1975 (age 51) (Mexican-born)
- Anne Ramsey 1929–1988
- Laura Ramsey born November 14, 1982 (age 43)
- Marion Ramsey 1947–2021
- Theresa Randle born December 27, 1964 (age 61)
- Jane Randolph 1914–2009
- Joyce Randolph 1924–2024
- June Diane Raphael born January 4, 1980 (age 46)
- Phylicia Rashad born June 19, 1948 (age 78)
- Emily Ratajkowski born June 7, 1991 (age 35)
- Kim Raver born March 15, 1969 (age 57)
- Navi Rawat born June 5, 1977 (age 49)
- Martha Raye 1916–1994
- Tania Raymonde born March 22, 1988 (age 38)
- Nancy Davis Reagan 1921–2016
- Elizabeth Reaser born June 15, 1975 (age 51)
- Alyson Reed born January 11, 1958 (age 68)
- Crystal Reed born February 6, 1985 (age 41)
- Donna Reed 1921–1986
- Nikki Reed born May 17, 1988 (age 38)
- Pamela Reed born April 2, 1949 (age 77)
- Della Reese 1931–2017
- Autumn Reeser born September 21, 1980 (age 46)
- Bridget Regan born February 3, 1982 (age 44)
- Storm Reid born July 1, 2003 (age 23)
- Tara Reid born November 8, 1975 (age 51)
- Lee Remick 1935–1991
- Leah Remini born June 15, 1970 (age 56)
- Retta born April 12, 1970 (age 56)
- Anne Revere 1903–1990
- Judy Reyes born November 19, 1967 (age 58)
- Debbie Reynolds 1932–2016
- Alicia Rhett 1915–2014
- Barbara Rhoades born March 23, 1947 (age 79)
- Cynthia Rhodes born November 21, 1956 (age 69)
- Jennifer Rhodes born August 17, 1947 (age 79)
- Kim Rhodes born June 7, 1969 (age 57)
- Monica Rial born October 5, 1975 (age 51)
- Marissa Ribisi born December 17, 1974 (age 51)
- Elizabeth Rice born November 5, 1985 (age 41)
- Gigi Rice born March 13, 1965 (age 61)
- Christina Ricci born February 12, 1980 (age 46)
- Irene Rich 1891–1988
- Ariana Richards born September 11, 1979 (age 47)
- Beah Richards 1920–2000
- Denise Richards born February 17, 1971 (age 55)
- Kim Richards born September 19, 1964 (age 62)
- Kyle Richards born January 11, 1969 (age 57)
- Cameron Richardson born September 11, 1979 (age 47)
- LaTanya Richardson born October 21, 1949 (age 77)
- Natasha Richardson 1963–2009 (British-born)
- Patricia Richardson born February 23, 1951 (age 75)
- Ashley Rickards born May 4, 1992 (age 34)
- Beth Riesgraf born August 24, 1978 (age 48)
- Amanda Righetti born April 4, 1983 (age 43)
- Jeannine Riley born October 1, 1940 (age 86)
- LeAnn Rimes born August 28, 1982 (age 44)
- Molly Ringwald born February 18, 1968 (age 58)
- Lisa Rinna born July 11, 1963 (age 63)
- Kelly Ripa born October 2, 1970 (age 56)
- Emily Rios born April 27, 1989 (age 37)
- Krysten Ritter born December 16, 1981 (age 44)
- Thelma Ritter 1902–1969
- Naya Rivera 1987–2020
- AnnaSophia Robb born December 8, 1993 (age 32)
- Avalon Robbins born July 3, 2001 (age 25)
- Doris Roberts 1925–2016
- Emma Roberts born February 10, 1991 (age 35)
- Julia Roberts born October 28, 1967 (age 59)
- Lynne Roberts 1922–1978
- Tanya Roberts 1955–2021
- Britt Robertson born April 18, 1990 (age 36)
- Robey born March 14, 1960 (age 66) (Canadian-American born)
- Wendy Robie born October 6, 1953 (age 73)
- Wendy Raquel Robinson born July 25, 1967 (age 59)
- Ann Robinson 1929–2025
- Cindy Robinson born April 6, 1973 (age 53)
- Holly Robinson Peete born September 18, 1964 (age 62)
- Lela Rochon born April 17, 1964 (age 62)
- Holland Roden born October 7, 1986 (age 40)
- Olivia Rodrigo born February 20, 2003 (age 23)
- Gina Rodriguez born July 30, 1984 (age 42)
- Michelle Rodriguez born July 12, 1978 (age 48)
- Raini Rodriguez born July 1, 1993 (age 33)
- Sarah Roemer born August 28, 1984 (age 42)
- Ginger Rogers 1911–1995
- Mimi Rogers born January 27, 1956 (age 70)
- Elisabeth Röhm born April 28, 1973 (age 53) (born in Germany)
- Esther Rolle 1920–1998
- Rose Rollins born April 30, 1981 (age 45)
- Ruth Roman 1922–1999
- Christy Carlson Romano born March 20, 1984 (age 42)
- Rebecca Romijn born November 6, 1972 (age 54)
- Xosha Roquemore born December 11, 1984 (age 41)
- Anika Noni Rose born September 6, 1972 (age 54)
- Cristine Rose born January 31, 1951 (age 75)
- Emily Rose born February 2, 1981 (age 45)
- Margot Rose born July 17, 1956 (age 70)
- Diana Ross born March 26, 1944 (age 82)
- Katharine Ross born January 29, 1940 (age 86)
- Lyric Ross born September 30, 2003 (age 23)
- Tracee Ellis Ross born October 29, 1972 (age 54)
- Emmy Rossum born September 12, 1986 (age 40)
- Lillian Roth 1910–1980
- Jessica Rothe born May 28, 1987 (age 39)
- Misty Rowe born June 1, 1952 (age 74)
- Victoria Rowell born May 10, 1959 (age 67)
- Kelly Rowland born February 11, 1981 (age 45)
- Gena Rowlands 1930–2024
- Jennifer Rubin born April 3, 1962 (age 64)
- Zelda Rubinstein 1933–2010
- Maya Rudolph born July 27, 1972 (age 54)
- Sara Rue born January 26, 1979 (age 47)
- Mercedes Ruehl born February 28, 1948 (age 78)
- Janice Rule 1931–2003
- Olesya Rulin born March 17, 1986 (age 40) (born in Russia)
- Jennifer Runyon 1960–2026
- Debra Jo Rupp born February 24, 1951 (age 75)
- Barbara Rush 1927–2024
- Odeya Rush born May 12, 1997 (age 29) (Israeli-born)
- Betsy Russell born September 6, 1963 (age 63)
- Gail Russell 1924–1961
- Jane Russell 1921–2011
- Keri Russell born March 23, 1976 (age 50)
- Rosalind Russell 1907–1976
- Theresa Russell born March 20, 1957 (age 69)
- Deanna Russo born October 17, 1979 (age 47)
- Rene Russo born February 17, 1954 (age 72)
- Kelly Rutherford born November 6, 1968 (age 58)
- Amy Ryan born May 3, 1969 (age 57)
- Blanchard Ryan born January 12, 1967 (age 59)
- Debby Ryan born May 13, 1993 (age 33)
- Eileen Ryan 1928–2022
- Irene Ryan 1902–1973
- Jeri Ryan born February 22, 1968 (age 58)
- Meg Ryan born November 19, 1961 (age 64)
- Winona Ryder born October 29, 1971 (age 55)

== S ==
- Katee Sackhoff born April 8, 1980 (age 46)
- Katey Sagal born January 19, 1954 (age 72)
- Halston Sage born May 10, 1993 (age 33)
- Eva Marie Saint 1924–2026
- Susan Saint James 1946–2026
- Meredith Salenger born March 14, 1970 (age 56)
- Zoe Saldaña born June 19, 1978 (age 48)
- Laura San Giacomo born November 14, 1962 (age 63)
- Kiele Sanchez born October 13, 1977 (age 49)
- Erin Sanders born January 19, 1991 (age 35)
- Jackie Sandler born September 24, 1974 (age 52)
- Sunny Sandler born November 2, 2008 (age 18)
- Bianca Santos born July 26, 1990 (age 36)
- Mia Sara born June 19, 1967 (age 59)
- Susan Sarandon born October 4, 1946 (age 80)
- Tura Satana 1938–2011
- Lori Saunders born October 4, 1941 (age 85)
- Morgan Saylor born October 26, 1994 (age 32)
- Allison Scagliotti born September 21, 1990 (age 36)
- Gia Scala 1934–1972 (English-born)
- Diana Scarwid born August 27, 1955 (age 71)
- Cassie Scerbo born March 30, 1990 (age 36)
- Kristen Schaal born January 24, 1978 (age 48)
- Wendy Schaal born July 2, 1954 (age 72)
- Felice Schachter born November 17, 1963 (age 62)
- Rebecca Schaeffer 1967–1989
- Natalie Schafer 1900–1991
- Anne Schedeen born January 8, 1949 (age 77)
- Taylor Schilling born July 27, 1984 (age 42)
- Carly Schroeder born October 18, 1990 (age 36)
- Rebecca Schull born February 22, 1929 (age 97)
- Amy Schumer born June 1, 1981 (age 45)
- Annabella Sciorra born March 29, 1960 (age 66)
- Ashley Scott born July 13, 1977 (age 49)
- Jill Scott born April 4, 1972 (age 54)
- Lizabeth Scott 1922–2015
- Martha Scott 1912–2003
- Stefanie Scott born December 6, 1996 (age 29)
- Amy Sedaris born March 29, 1961 (age 65)
- Kyra Sedgwick born August 19, 1965 (age 61)
- Sandra Seacat 1936-2023
- Marian Seldes 1928–2014
- Christian Serratos born September 21, 1990 (age 36)
- Joan Severance born December 23, 1958 (age 67)
- Chloë Sevigny born November 18, 1974 (age 51)
- Billie Seward 1912–1982
- Amanda Seyfried born December 3, 1985 (age 40)
- Anne Seymour 1909–1988
- Jane Seymour born February 15, 1951 (age 75) (British-born)
- Sarah Shahi born January 10, 1980 (age 46)
- Yara Shahidi born February 10, 2000 (age 26)
- Molly Shannon born September 16, 1964 (age 62)
- Karen Sharpe born September 20, 1934 (age 92)
- Lindsey Shaw born May 10, 1989 (age 37)
- Vinessa Shaw born July 19, 1976 (age 50)
- Alia Shawkat born April 18, 1989 (age 37)
- Lin Shaye born October 12, 1943 (age 83)
- Norma Shearer 1920–1983 (Canadian-American)
- Ally Sheedy born June 13, 1962 (age 64)
- Kate Lyn Sheil born June 13, 1985 (age 41)
- Adrienne Shelly 1966–2006
- Marley Shelton born April 12, 1974 (age 52)
- Jan Shepard 1928–2025
- Cybill Shepherd born February 18, 1950 (age 76)
- Sherri Shepherd born April 22, 1967 (age 59)
- Ann Sheridan 1915–1967
- Lisa Sheridan 1974–2019
- Margaret Sheridan 1926–1982
- Nicollette Sheridan born November 21, 1963 (age 62) (British-born)
- Brooke Shields born May 31, 1965 (age 61)
- Kiernan Shipka born November 10, 1999 (age 26)
- Alexandra Shipp born July 16, 1991 (age 35)
- Talia Shire born April 25, 1946 (age 80)
- Anne Shirley 1918–1993
- Dinah Shore 1916–1994
- Elisabeth Shue born October 6, 1963 (age 63)
- Jane Sibbett born November 28, 1962 (age 63)
- Gabourey Sidibe born May 6, 1983 (age 43)
- Sylvia Sidney 1910–1999
- Drew Sidora born May 1, 1985 (age 41)
- Maggie Siff born June 21, 1974 (age 52)
- Jamie-Lynn Sigler born May 15, 1981 (age 45)
- Karen Sillas born June 5, 1963 (age 63)
- Leslie Silva born April 21, 1968 (age 58)
- Sarah Silverman born December 1, 1970 (age 55)
- Alicia Silverstone born October 4, 1976 (age 50)
- Jessica Simpson born July 10, 1980 (age 46)
- Molly Sims born May 25, 1973 (age 53)
- Nancy Sinatra born June 8, 1940 (age 86)
- Jaz Sinclair born July 22, 1994 (age 32)
- Lori Singer born November 6, 1957 (age 69)
- Sadie Sink born April 16, 2002 (age 24)
- Marina Sirtis born March 29, 1955 (age 71) (English-born)
- Jennifer Sky born October 13, 1976 (age 50)
- Azura Skye born November 8, 1981 (age 45)
- Ione Skye born September 4, 1970 (age 56)
- Jenny Slate born March 25, 1982 (age 44)
- Helen Slater born December 15, 1963 (age 62)
- Lindsay Sloane born August 8, 1977 (age 49)
- Amy Smart born March 26, 1976 (age 50)
- Jean Smart born September 13, 1951 (age 75)
- Amber Smith born March 2, 1971 (age 55)
- Anna Nicole Smith 1967–2007
- Brooke Smith born May 22, 1967 (age 59)
- Jaclyn Smith born October 26, 1945 (age 81)
- Kellita Smith born January 15, 1969 (age 57)
- Lois Smith born November 3, 1930 (age 96)
- Madolyn Smith born January 1, 1957 (age 69)
- Martha Smith born October 16, 1952 (age 74)
- Shawnee Smith born July 3, 1969 (age 57)
- Shelley Smith 1952-2023
- Tasha Smith born February 28, 1971 (age 55)
- Willow Smith born October 31, 2000 (age 26)
- Yeardley Smith born July 3, 1964 (age 62) (born in France)
- Jan Smithers born July 3, 1949 (age 77)
- Carrie Snodgress 1945–2004
- Brittany Snow born March 9, 1986 (age 40)
- Liza Snyder born March 20, 1968 (age 58)
- Leelee Sobieski born June 10, 1983 (age 43)
- Rena Sofer born December 2, 1968 (age 57)
- Marla Sokoloff born December 19, 1980 (age 45)
- Sarah Sokolovic born November 30, 1979 (age 46)
- P. J. Soles born July 17, 1950 (age 76)
- Suzanne Somers 1946–2023
- Bonnie Somerville born February 24, 1974 (age 52)
- Phyllis Somerville 1943–2020
- Gale Sondergaard 1899–1985
- Brenda Song born March 27, 1988 (age 38)
- Mira Sorvino born September 28, 1967 (age 59)
- Shannyn Sossamon born October 3, 1978 (age 48)
- Ann Sothern 1909–2001
- Sissy Spacek born December 25, 1949 (age 76)
- Jordin Sparks born December 22, 1989 (age 36)
- Britney Spears born December 2, 1981 (age 44)
- Jamie Lynn Spears born April 4, 1991 (age 35)
- Scarlett Spears born June 12, 2017 (age 9)
- Tori Spelling born May 16, 1973 (age 53)
- Abigail Spencer born August 4, 1981 (age 45)
- Danielle Spencer 1965–2025
- Octavia Spencer born May 25, 1970 (age 56)
- Ashley Spillers born August 13, 1986 (age 40)
- June Squibb born November 6, 1929 (age 97)
- Gina St. John
- Jill St. John born August 19, 1940 (age 86)
- Kelly Stables born January 26, 1978 (age 48)
- Florence Stanley 1924–2003
- Kim Stanley 1925–2001
- Barbara Stanwyck 1907–1990
- Jean Stapleton 1923–2013
- Maureen Stapleton 1925–2006
- Karen Steele 1931–1988
- Mary Steenburgen born February 8, 1953 (age 73)
- Leslie Stefanson born May 10, 1971 (age 55)
- Hailee Steinfeld born December 11, 1996 (age 29)
- Amandla Stenberg born October 23, 1998 (age 28)
- Jan Sterling 1921–2004
- Mindy Sterling born July 11, 1953 (age 73)
- Frances Sternhagen 1930–2023
- Amber Stevens born October 7, 1986 (age 40)
- Connie Stevens born August 8, 1938 (age 88)
- Inger Stevens 1934–1970 (Swedish-born)
- Kaye Stevens 1932–2011
- Stella Stevens 1938-2023
- Elaine Stewart 1930–2011
- Kristen Stewart born April 9, 1990 (age 36)
- Julia Stiles born March 28, 1981 (age 45)
- Emma Stone born November 6, 1988 (age 38)
- Jennifer Stone born February 12, 1993 (age 33)
- Sharon Stone born March 10, 1958 (age 68)
- Alyson Stoner born August 11, 1993 (age 33)
- Gale Storm 1922–2009
- Madeleine Stowe born August 18, 1958 (age 68)
- Beatrice Straight 1914–2001
- Susan Strasberg 1938–1999
- Meryl Streep born June 22, 1949 (age 77)
- Barbra Streisand born April 24, 1942 (age 84)
- Cecily Strong born February 4, 1984 (age 42)
- Brenda Strong born March 25, 1960 (age 66)
- Jessica Stroup born October 23, 1986 (age 40)
- Sally Struthers born July 28, 1947 (age 79)
- Barbara Stuart 1930–2011
- Jean Stuart 1906–1926 Silent films
- Gloria Stuart 1910–2010
- Margaret Sullavan 1909–1960
- Kelly Sullivan born February 3, 1978 (age 48)
- Kristine Sutherland born April 17, 1955 (age 71)
- Carol Sutton 1944–2020
- Mena Suvari born February 13, 1979 (age 47)
- Dominique Swain born August 12, 1980 (age 46)
- Hilary Swank born July 30, 1974 (age 52)
- Gloria Swanson 1899–1983
- Kristy Swanson born December 19, 1969 (age 56)
- Julia Sweeney born October 10, 1959 (age 67)
- Jodie Sweetin born January 19, 1982 (age 44)
- Taylor Swift born December 13, 1989 (age 36)
- Amanda Swisten born December 20, 1978 (age 47)
- Loretta Swit 1937–2025
- Wanda Sykes born March 7, 1964 (age 62)
- Raven-Symoné born December 10, 1985 (age 40)

== T ==
- Sophia Takal born May 12, 1986 (age 40)
- Nita Talbot born August 8, 1930 (age 96)
- Patricia Tallman born September 4, 1957 (age 69)
- Constance Talmadge 1898–1973
- Natalie Talmadge 1896–1969
- Norma Talmadge 1894–1957
- Amber Tamblyn born May 14, 1983 (age 43)
- Jessica Tandy 1909–1994
- Katelyn Tarver born November 2, 1989 (age 37)
- Lilyan Tashman 1896–1934
- Sharon Tate 1943–1969
- Christine Taylor born July 30, 1971 (age 55)
- Elizabeth Taylor 1932–2011
- Holland Taylor born January 14, 1943 (age 83)
- Jennifer Taylor born April 19, 1972 (age 54)
- Leigh Taylor-Young born 1945
- Lili Taylor born February 20, 1967 (age 59)
- Scout Taylor-Compton born February 21, 1989 (age 37)
- Tamara Taylor born September 27, 1970 (age 56) (Canadian-American born)
- Aimee Teegarden born October 10, 1989 (age 37)
- Shirley Temple 1928–2014
- Tia Texada born December 14, 1971 (age 54)
- Maria Thayer born October 30, 1975 (age 51)
- Charlize Theron born August 7, 1975 (age 51) (South African-born)
- Tiffani Thiessen born January 23, 1974 (age 52)
- Lynne Thigpen 1948–2003
- Olivia Thirlby born October 6, 1986 (age 40)
- Heather Thomas born September 8, 1957 (age 69)
- Marlo Thomas born November 21, 1937 (age 88)
- Lea Thompson born May 31, 1961 (age 65)
- Susanna Thompson born January 27, 1958 (age 68)
- Tessa Thompson born October 3, 1983 (age 43)
- Bella Thorne born October 8, 1997 (age 29)
- Callie Thorne born November 20, 1969 (age 56)
- Courtney Thorne-Smith born November 8, 1967 (age 59)
- Uma Thurman born April 29, 1970 (age 56)
- Gene Tierney 1920–1991
- Maura Tierney born February 3, 1965 (age 61)
- Pamela Tiffin 1942–2020
- Jennifer Tilly born September 16, 1958 (age 68)
- Meg Tilly born February 14, 1960 (age 66)
- Addison Timlin born June 29, 1991 (age 35)
- Lio Tipton born November 9, 1988 (age 37)
- Ashley Tisdale born July 2, 1985 (age 41)
- Brianne Tju born June 14, 1998 (age 28)
- Hallie Todd born January 7, 1962 (age 64)
- Thelma Todd 1906–1935
- Lauren Tom born August 4, 1961 (age 65)
- Nicholle Tom born March 23, 1978 (age 48)
- Marisa Tomei born December 4, 1964 (age 61)
- Tamlyn Tomita born January 27, 1966 (age 60)
- Lily Tomlin born September 1, 1939 (age 87)
- Gina Torres born April 25, 1969 (age 57)
- Josie Totah born August 5, 2001 (age 25)
- Audrey Totter 1917–2013
- Constance Towers born May 20, 1933 (age 93)
- Michelle Trachtenberg 1985–2025
- Thalia Tran born May 20, 2006 (age 20)
- Nancy Travis born September 21, 1961 (age 65)
- Claire Trevor 1910–2000
- Jeanne Tripplehorn born June 10, 1963 (age 63)
- Dorothy Tristan 1934–2023
- Rachel True born November 15, 1966 (age 59)
- Jessica Tuck born February 19, 1963 (age 63)
- Robin Tunney born June 19, 1972 (age 54)
- Paige Turco born May 17, 1965 (age 61)
- Bree Turner born March 10, 1977 (age 49)
- Debbie Turner born September 5, 1956 (age 70)
- Janine Turner born December 6, 1962 (age 63)
- Kathleen Turner born June 19, 1954 (age 72)
- Lana Turner 1921–1995
- Tina Turner 1939–2023
- Helen Twelvetrees 1908–1958
- Aisha Tyler born September 18, 1970 (age 56)
- Liv Tyler born July 1, 1977 (age 49)
- Susan Tyrrell 1945–2012
- Cicely Tyson 1924–2021

== U ==
- Alanna Ubach born October 3, 1975 (age 51)
- Leslie Uggams born May 25, 1943 (age 83)
- Tracey Ullman born December 30, 1959 (age 66)
- Kim Johnston Ulrich born March 24, 1955 (age 71)
- Carrie Underwood born March 10, 1983 (age 43)
- Sara Jean Underwood born March 24, 1984 (age 42)
- Sheryl Underwood born October 28, 1963 (age 63)
- Gabrielle Union born October 29, 1972 (age 54)
- Kate Upton born June 10, 1992 (age 34)
- Jenna Ushkowitz born April 28, 1986 (age 40) (Korean-born)

== V ==
- Brenda Vaccaro born November 18, 1939 (age 86)
- Cristina Valenzuela born July 11, 1987 (age 39)
- Sigrid Valdis 1935–2007
- Nancy Valen born December 16, 1965 (age 60)
- Brooke Valentine born October 5, 1984 (age 42)
- Cindy Valentine born August 22, 1975 (age 51) (Italian-born)
- Karen Valentine born May 25, 1947 (age 79)
- Amber Valletta born February 9, 1974 (age 52)
- Joan Van Ark born June 16, 1943 (age 83)
- Mamie Van Doren born February 6, 1931 (age 95)
- Hilary Van Dyke born October 30, 1970 (age 56)
- Grace Van Patten born November 21, 1996 (age 29)
- Joyce Van Patten born March 9, 1934 (age 92)
- Deborah Van Valkenburgh born August 29, 1952 (age 74)
- Monique Van Vooren 1927–2020 (born in Belgium)
- Jo Van Fleet 1914–1996
- Danitra Vance 1954–1994
- Vivian Vance 1909–1979
- Grace VanderWaal born January 15, 2004 (age 22)
- Shantel VanSanten born July 25, 1985 (age 41)
- Janet Varney born February 16, 1976 (age 50)
- Diane Varsi 1938–1992
- Liz Vassey born August 9, 1972 (age 54)
- Sofia Vassilieva born October 22, 1992 (age 34)
- Countess Vaughn born August 8, 1978 (age 48)
- Terri J. Vaughn born October 16, 1969 (age 57)
- Alexa Vega born August 27, 1988 (age 38)
- Makenzie Vega born February 10, 1994 (age 32)
- Jaci Velasquez born October 15, 1979 (age 47)
- Nadine Velazquez born November 20, 1978 (age 47)
- Lauren Vélez born November 2, 1964 (age 62)
- Evelyn Venable 1913-1993
- Diane Venora born August 10, 1952 (age 74)
- Cassie Ventura born August 26, 1986 (age 40)
- Gwen Verdon 1925–2000
- Elena Verdugo 1925–2017
- Sofia Vergara born July 10, 1972 (age 54) (born in Colombia)
- Kate Vernon born April 21, 1961 (age 65) (born in Canada)
- Victoria Vetri born September 26, 1944 (age 82)
- Yvette Vickers 1928–2010
- Christina Vidal born November 18, 1981 (age 44)
- Lisa Vidal born June 13, 1965 (age 61)
- Tracy Vilar born April 12, 1968 (age 58)
- Nana Visitor born July 26, 1957 (age 69)
- Jenna von Oÿ born May 2, 1977 (age 49)
- Lark Voorhies born March 25, 1974 (age 52)
- Gloria Votsis born February 9, 1979 (age 47)

== W ==
- Caitlin Wachs born March 15, 1989 (age 37)
- Lindsay Wagner born June 22, 1949 (age 77)
- Natasha Gregson Wagner born September 29, 1970 (age 56)
- Janet Waldo 1920–2016
- Shawna Waldron born January 25, 1982 (age 44)
- Ethel Wales 1878–1952
- Sonya Walger born June 6, 1974 (age 52) (English-born)
- Abby Walker born April 8, 1987 (age 39)
- Ally Walker born August 25, 1961 (age 65)
- Arnetia Walker born July 11, 1954 (age 72)
- Bree Walker born February 26, 1953 (age 73)
- Dreama Walker born June 20, 1986 (age 40)
- Kathryn Walker born January 9, 1943 (age 83)
- Nancy Walker 1922–1992
- Dee Wallace born December 14, 1948 (age 77)
- Marcia Wallace 1942–2013
- Quvenzhané Wallis born August 28, 2003 (age 23)
- Kate Walsh born October 13, 1967 (age 59)
- Maiara Walsh born February 18, 1988 (age 38)
- Jessica Walter 1941–2021
- Lisa Ann Walter born August 3, 1963 (age 63)
- Laurie Walters born January 8, 1947 (age 79)
- Melora Walters born October 21, 1959 (age 67) (born in Saudi Arabia)
- Nancy Walters 1933–2009
- Susan Walters born September 28, 1963 (age 63)
- Peggy Walton-Walker born September 1, 1943 (age 83)
- Zoë Wanamaker born May 13, 1949 (age 77)
- B. J. Ward born September 12, 1944 (age 82)
- Maitland Ward born February 3, 1977 (age 49)
- Megan Ward born September 24, 1969 (age 57)
- Rachel Ward born September 12, 1957 (age 69) (British-American born)
- Sela Ward born July 11, 1956 (age 70)
- Susan Ward born April 15, 1976 (age 50)
- Emily Warfield born August 10, 1972 (age 54)
- Marlene Warfield 1941–2025
- Marsha Warfield born March 5, 1954 (age 72)
- Dawn Rochelle Warner born December 7, 1972 (age 53)
- Julie Warner born February 9, 1965 (age 61)
- Estella Warren born December 23, 1978 (age 47)
- Jennifer Warren born August 12, 1941 (age 85)
- Karle Warren born February 8, 1992 (age 34)
- Kiersten Warren born November 4, 1965 (age 61)
- Lesley Ann Warren born August 16, 1946 (age 80)
- Ruth Warrick 1916–2005
- Fredi Washington 1903–1994
- Kerry Washington born January 31, 1977 (age 49)
- Ethel Waters 1896–1977
- Katherine Waterston born March 3, 1980 (age 46) (English-born)
- Carlene Watkins born June 4, 1952 (age 74)
- Michaela Watkins born December 14, 1971 (age 54)
- Cynthia Watros born September 2, 1968 (age 58)
- Vernee Watson-Johnson born September 28, 1949 (age 77)
- Rolonda Watts born July 12, 1959 (age 67)
- Kim Wayans born October 16, 1961 (age 65)
- Carol Wayne 1942–1985
- Shawn Weatherly born July 24, 1959 (age 67)
- Sigourney Weaver born October 8, 1949 (age 77)
- Bresha Webb born July 10, 1987 (age 39)
- Chloe Webb born June 25, 1956 (age 70)
- Haley Webb born November 25, 1985 (age 40)
- Jane Webb 1925–2010
- Veronica Webb born February 25, 1965 (age 61)
- Ann Wedgeworth 1934–2017
- Virginia Weidler 1927–1968
- Liza Weil born June 5, 1977 (age 49)
- Rachel Weisz born March 7, 1970 (age 56) (English-born)
- Raquel Welch 1940–2023
- Savannah Welch born August 4, 1984 (age 42)
- Tahnee Welch born December 26, 1961 (age 64)
- Tuesday Weld born August 27, 1943 (age 83)
- Gwen Welles 1951–1993
- Virginia Welles 1925–2002
- Rebecca Wells 1928–2017
- Dawn Wells 1938–2020
- Ming-Na Wen born November 20, 1963 (age 62) (born in Macau)
- Mae West 1893–1980
- Nydia Westman 1902-1970
- Celia Weston born December 14, 1951 (age 74)
- Patricia Wettig born December 4, 1951 (age 74)
- Dana Wheeler-Nicholson born October 9, 1960 (age 66)
- Jill Whelan born September 29, 1966 (age 60)
- Lisa Whelchel born May 29, 1963 (age 63)
- Shannon Whirry born November 7, 1964 (age 62)
- Betty White 1922–2021
- Carole Ita White born August 24, 1949 (age 77)
- Julie White born June 4, 1961 (age 65)
- Karen Malina White born July 7, 1965 (age 61)
- Michole Briana White born May 29, 1969 (age 57)
- Persia White born October 24, 1972 (age 54)
- Ruth White 1914–1969
- Lynn Whitfield born May 6, 1953 (age 73)
- Mae Whitman born June 9, 1988 (age 38)
- Kym Whitley born June 7, 1961 (age 65)
- Grace Lee Whitney 1930–2015
- Josephine Whittell 1883–1961
- Mary Wickes 1910–1995
- Dianne Wiest born March 28, 1948 (age 78)
- Laura Slade Wiggins born August 8, 1988 (age 38)
- Kristen Wiig born August 22, 1973 (age 53)
- Collin Wilcox 1935–2009
- Lisa Wilcox born April 27, 1964 (age 62)
- Abby Wilde born February 25, 1989 (age 37)
- Olivia Wilde born March 10, 1984 (age 42)
- Samira Wiley born April 15, 1987 (age 39)
- Kathleen Wilhoite born June 29, 1964 (age 62)
- Adrienne Wilkinson born September 1, 1977 (age 49)
- Allison Williams born April 13, 1988 (age 38)
- Cara Williams 1925–2021
- Cindy Williams 1947–2023
- Esther Williams 1921–2013
- JoBeth Williams born December 6, 1948 (age 77)
- Kelli Williams born June 8, 1970 (age 56)
- Kiely Williams born July 9, 1986 (age 40)
- Kimberly Williams-Paisley born September 14, 1971 (age 55)
- Malinda Williams born September 24, 1970 (age 56)
- Michelle Williams born September 9, 1980 (age 46)
- Michelle Williams (singer) born July 23, 1980 (age 46)
- Natashia Williams born August 2, 1978 (age 48)
- Vanessa Williams born March 18, 1963 (age 63)
- Vanessa Estelle Williams born May 12, 1963 (age 63)
- Vesta Williams 1957–2011
- Wendy Williams born July 18, 1964 (age 62)
- Zelda Williams born July 31, 1989 (age 37)
- Afton Williamson born September 7, 1984 (age 42)
- Kate Williamson 1931–2013
- Kenya D. Williamson born November 20, 1945 (age 80)
- Alicia Leigh Willis born March 1, 1978 (age 48)
- Katherine Willis born May 2, 1971 (age 55)
- Rumer Willis born August 16, 1988 (age 38)
- Beverly Wills 1933–1963
- Bridgette Wilson born September 25, 1973 (age 53)
- Casey Wilson born October 24, 1980 (age 46)
- Chandra Wilson born August 27, 1969 (age 57)
- Debra Wilson born April 26, 1962 (age 64)
- Elizabeth Wilson 1921–2015
- Kristen Wilson born September 4, 1969 (age 57)
- Mara Wilson born July 24, 1987 (age 39)
- Marie Wilson 1916–1972
- Mary Louise Wilson born November 12, 1931 (age 94)
- Rita Wilson born October 26, 1956 (age 70)
- Sheree J. Wilson born December 12, 1958 (age 67)
- Camille Winbush born February 9, 1990 (age 36)
- Oprah Winfrey born January 29, 1954 (age 72)
- Debra Winger born May 16, 1955 (age 71)
- Mare Winningham born May 16, 1959 (age 67)
- Mary Elizabeth Winstead born November 28, 1984 (age 41)
- Ariel Winter born January 28, 1998 (age 28)
- Shelley Winters 1920–2006
- Jane Withers 1926–2021
- Reese Witherspoon born March 22, 1976 (age 50)
- Alicia Witt born August 21, 1975 (age 51)
- Collette Wolfe born April 4, 1980 (age 46)
- Fryda Wolff born May 25, 1982 (age 44)
- Deborah Ann Woll born February 7, 1985 (age 41)
- Evan Rachel Wood born September 7, 1987 (age 39)
- Lana Wood born March 31, 1946 (age 80)
- Natalie Wood 1938–1981
- Alfre Woodard born November 8, 1952 (age 74)
- Charlayne Woodard born December 29, 1953 (age 72)
- Pat Woodell 1944–2015
- Holly Woodlawn 1946–2015
- Shailene Woodley born November 15, 1991 (age 34)
- Ilene Woods 1929-2010
- Joanne Woodward born February 27, 1930 (age 96)
- Shannon Woodward born December 17, 1984 (age 41)
- Fay Wray 1907–2004
- Amy Wright born April 15, 1950 (age 76)
- N'Bushe Wright born September 20, 1970 (age 56)
- Robin Wright born April 8, 1966 (age 60)
- Teresa Wright 1918–2005
- Maris Wrixon 1916–1999
- Kari Wuhrer born April 28, 1967 (age 59)
- Sofia Wylie born January 7, 2004 (age 22)
- Jane Wyman 1917–2007
- Jane Wyatt 1910–2006

== Y ==
- Emily Yancy born April 28, 1939 (age 87)
- Lillian Yarbo 1905–1996
- Celeste Yarnall 1944–2018
- Danika Yarosh born October 1, 1998 (age 28)
- Amy Yasbeck born September 12, 1962 (age 64)
- Patti Yasutake 1953–2024
- Cassie Yates born March 2, 1951 (age 75)
- Deborah Yates born June 5, 1970 (age 56)
- Breanna Yde born June 11, 2003 (age 23)
- Susan Yeagley born February 27, 1972 (age 54)
- Ashlynn Yennie born May 15, 1985 (age 41)
- Morgan York born January 18, 1993 (age 33)
- Tina Yothers born May 5, 1973 (age 53)
- America Young born December 6, 1984 (age 41)
- Audrey Young 1922–2012
- Bellamy Young born February 19, 1970 (age 56)
- Carlson Young born October 29, 1990 (age 36)
- Clara Kimball Young 1890–1960
- Dey Young born July 28, 1955 (age 71)
- Evelyn Young 1915–1983
- Georgiana Young 1924–2007
- Karen Young born September 29, 1958 (age 68)
- Lauren Young born November 8, 1993 (age 33)
- Loretta Young 1913–2000
- Lucille Young 1883–1934
- Mary Young 1879–1971
- Polly Ann Young 1908–1997
- Ramona Young born May 23, 1998 (age 28)
- Sean Young born November 20, 1959 (age 66)
- Nancy Youngblut born February 14, 1953 (age 73)
- Barrie Youngfellow 1946–2022
- Krista Marie Yu born October 25, 1988 (age 38)
- Eugenia Yuan born October 26, 1976 (age 50)
- Blanche Yurka 1887–1974

== Z ==
- Grace Zabriskie born May 17, 1941 (age 85)
- Pia Zadora born May 4, 1954 (age 72)
- Kyra Zagorsky born June 6, 1976 (age 50)
- Roxana Zal born November 8, 1969 (age 57)
- Sasheer Zamata born May 6, 1986 (age 40)
- Lisa Zane born April 5, 1961 (age 65)
- Carmen Zapata 1927–2014
- Natalie Zea born March 17, 1975 (age 51)
- Rachel Zegler born May 3, 2001 (age 25)
- Nora Zehetner born February 5, 1981 (age 45)
- Renée Zellweger born April 25, 1969 (age 57)
- Jacklyn Zeman 1953–2023
- Kai Zen born February 6, 2012 (age 14)
- Zendaya born September 1, 1996 (age 30)
- Colleen Zenk born January 27, 1953 (age 73)
- Susanne Zenor born November 26, 1946 (age 79)
- Madeline Zima born September 16, 1985 (age 41)
- Vanessa Zima born December 17, 1986 (age 39)
- Yvonne Zima born January 16, 1989 (age 37)
- Stephanie Zimbalist born October 8, 1956 (age 70)
- Constance Zimmer born October 11, 1970 (age 56)
- Laurie Zimmer born March 2, 1949 (age 77)
- Leigh Zimmerman born March 28, 1969 (age 57)
- Winter Ave Zoli born June 28, 1980 (age 46)
- Sheri Moon Zombie born September 26, 1970 (age 56)
- Charlotte Zucker 1921–2007
- Cozi Zuehlsdorff born August 3, 1998 (age 28)
- Daphne Zuniga born October 28, 1962 (age 64)

See key to entries above.

== See also ==
- Lists of Americans
