= Group marriage =

Three or more adults in a partnership

Group marriage or conjoint marriage is a marital arrangement where three or more adults enter into sexual, affective, romantic, or otherwise intimate short- or long-term partnerships, and share in any combination of finances, residences, care or kin work. Group marriage is considered a form of polygamy. While academic usage has traditionally treated group marriage as a marital arrangement, more recent usage has expanded the concept to allow for the inclusion of non-conjugal unions. Colloquial usage of group marriage has also been associated with polyamory and polyamorous families.

== Classification ==
Depending on the sexual orientations of the individuals involved, all adults in the group marriage may be sexual partners of all others with whom they are compatible. For instance, if all members are heterosexual, all the women may have sexual relationships with all the men. If members are bisexual or pansexual, they may have evolved sexual relationships with either sex.

Group marriage implies a strong commitment to be "faithful" by having sex only within the group and intending to remain together for an extended period. The group may be open to taking on new partners, but only if all members of the family agree to accept the new person as a partner. The new person then moves into the household and becomes an equal member of the family.

The most common form of group marriage appears to be a triad of two women and one man, or less often two men and one woman.

== Legal aspects ==
In most countries, it is not illegal for three or more people to form and share a sexual relationship (subject sometimes to laws against homosexuality), though such relational forms risk running afoul of state or local ordinances banning unmarried cohabitation. No Western country permits statutory marriage between more than two people. Nor do they give strong and equal legal protection (e.g., of rights relating to children) to non-married partners — the legal regime is not comparable to that applied to married couples. Individuals involved in polyamorous relationships are considered by the law to be no different from people who live together or date under other circumstances.

== Non-European cultures ==
- Polygyny is most common in a region known as the "polygamy belt" in West Africa and Central Africa, with the countries estimated to have the highest polygamy prevalence in the world being Burkina Faso, Mali, Gambia, Niger and Nigeria.
- Among the Ancient Hawaiians, the relationship of punalua involved "the fact that two or more brothers with their wives, or two or more sisters with their husbands, were inclined to possess each other in common". Friedrich Ratzel in The History of Mankind reported in 1896 that in Hawaii a kind of incipient polyandry arose by the addition to the marriage establishment of a cicisbeo, known as Punalua.
- In some parts of Melanesia, there are "sexual relations between a group of men formed by the husband's brothers and a group of women formed by the wife's sisters".
- Women of the Nair community, a caste in Kerala, India, used to practice polyandry.
- Toda people, who live on the isolated Nilgiri plateau of Southern India practiced adelphic polyandry for centuries, but no longer do so. Adelphic polyandry occurs when brothers share the same wife or wives. Such arrangements have been common in Himalayan tribes until recently.
- In Sri Lanka, Sinhalese people practiced adelphic polyandry in the past, but no longer it is common to do so. The main motive behind this is to protect the wealth undivided. If there were seven or fewer brothers in a family, younger brothers get access to the eldest brother's wife. For families with more than seven brothers, the eighth brother will marry a new bride. Younger brothers get access to the eighth brother's wife, but not the elder brothers.
- Couple-to-couple marriages were made between the Alaskan Yup'ik until the early twentieth century when Christian missionaries suppressed the practice. Group marriage was not a standard of Yup'ik social order but rather a voluntary romantic arrangement between established couples.

The following instances are cited in Thomas 1906.

- In North America there is "group marriage as existing among the Omahas ... adelphic polygyny."
- Among the Dieri of Australia exist forms of spouse-sharing known as pirrauru, in two categories "according to whether or not the man has or has not a tippa-malku wife. In the first case it is, taken in combination with the tippa-malku marriage, a case of bilateral dissimilar adelphic (M. and F.) polygamy. In the latter case it is dissimilar adelphic (tribal) polyandry". The pirrauru "relation arises through the exchange by brothers of their wives".
- Among the Kurnandaburi of Australia, "a group of men who are own or tribal brothers are united ... in group marriage".
- Among the Wakelbura of Australia, there is "adelphic polyandry."
- Among the Kurnai of Australia, "unmarried men have access to their brothers' wives."

== In modern U.S. practices ==
Group marriage occasionally occurred in communal societies founded in the 19th and 20th centuries.

A long-lived example was the Oneida Community founded by John Humphrey Noyes in 1848. Noyes taught that he and his followers, having reached 200 in number, had thus undergone sanctification; that is, it was impossible for them to sin, and that for the sanctified, marriage (along with private property) was abolished as an expression of jealousy and exclusiveness. The Oneida commune lived together as a single large group and shared parental responsibilities. Any given male-female combination in the group was free to have sex, usually upon the man's asking the woman, and this was the common practice for many years. The group began to falter about 1879–1881, eventually disbanding after Noyes fled arrest. Several dozen pairs of Oneidans quickly married in traditional fashion.

The Kerista Commune practiced group marriage in San Francisco from 1971 to 1991, calling their version polyfidelity.

It is difficult to estimate the number of people who actually practice group marriage in modern societies, as such a form of marriage is not officially recognized or permitted in any jurisdiction in the U.S., and de jure illegal in many. It is also not always visible when people sharing a residence consider themselves privately to be a group marriage.

== Portrayal in media ==
Group marriage appears in some of the novels of Robert A. Heinlein such as Stranger in a Strange Land (1961), The Moon Is a Harsh Mistress (1966), Time Enough for Love (1973), and Friday (1982). Stranger in a Strange Land describes a communal group much like the Oneida Society. Heinlein created specific types of group marriages for The Moon Is a Harsh Mistress (line marriage) and Friday (S-groups).

In several of her Hainish Cycle stories (the cycle began in 1964) Ursula Le Guin describes a type of four-person marriage known as a sedoretu, practiced on the planet O. In this arrangement, a man and a woman from each of the two moiety are married to each other, but each member of the marriage only has sexual relationship with the male and the female spouse of the opposite moiety.

Proposition 31 is a 1968 novel by Robert Rimmer that tells the story of two middle-class, suburban California couples who adopt a relationship structure of polyfidelity to deal with their multiple infidelities, as a rationalistic alternative to divorce. In the book, the solution to the couples' problems with adultery and the impregnation of one couple's wife by the other couple's husband is to commit to a group marriage to raise their five children in a home compound in which the husbands rotate among the wives.

Larry Constantine and his legal wife, at the time, Joan Constantine, researched and practiced group marriage in the 1970s. They created the Family Tree organization to promote healthy non-monogamous families, and collaboratively authored a book on the subject in 1974, Group Marriage: A Study of Contemporary Multilateral Marriage (Collier Books, 1974).

In James Alan Gardner's book Vigilant (1999) the protagonist is part of a group marriage with multiple men and women involved.

In the 2010 television show Caprica, several main characters are portrayed as being in a polyfidelitous-style marriage consisting of multiple men and women, with each member being equal socially and legally. Such marriages co-exist along with monogamous marriages in the show's civilization. When asked about this aspect of the series, co-creator Ronald D. Moore said "In terms of polygamy, it's usually framed in a "Big Love" context – it's one man with many wives. I thought there was something even more intriguing about a true group marriage where all of the partners were married to one another. They have this much bigger definition of what a marriage was and I thought it was a fascinating cultural idea ...".

The fourth episode of the fourth season of the CBS television series, Elementary, an American procedural drama television series that presents a contemporary update of Sir Arthur Conan Doyle's character Sherlock Holmes, has a focus on group marriages. In the episode All My Exes Live in Essex, the victim of Sherlock Holmes's latest case was a participant in a group marriage with two men, and was once in another group marriage with five other people.

In the novel series The Expanse, by James S. A. Corey, which began in 2011, a number of different group marriages are portrayed, such as one with main protagonist James Holden's eight parents. Their marriage consists of one straight couple, one gay couple, and one polyamorous group of four. Their octet primarily exists to exploit a loophole in tax code allowing them to own twenty-two acres of farmland. Group marriages are also described as common on Mars and in the Asteroid Belt.

In the novel Europa Strike by Ian Douglas, one of the POV characters mentions a couple of non-traditional marriages, including three men, and one man with two women. These are off-handed mentions although they are an acknowledged part of the book's universe, with the existence of non-traditional marriage practices having been mentioned in earlier books of the Heritage Trilogy.

== See also ==
- Cohabitation in the United States
- POSSLQ
- Proposition 31, a novel by Robert Rimmer
- Samenlevingscontract
- Types of marriages

== Bibliography ==
- Constantine, Larry and Joan (1974). Group Marriage: A Study of Contemporary Multilateral Marriage. Collier Books. ISBN 978-0020759102.
- Dillard, J.M. (1990). The Lost Years. Pocket Books. p. 440. ISBN 978-0-6717-0795-8.
- Emens, Elizabeth F. (2004). "Monogamy's Law: Compulsory Monogamy and Polyamorous Existence". New York University Review of Law & Social Change. 29 (2): 277.
- Heinlein, Robert (1996). The Moon Is a Harsh Mistress. Tom Doherty Associates, Inc. ISBN 978-0-3128-6176-6.
- Murdock, George P. (1949). Social Structure. New York: The MacMillan Company. ISBN 0-02-922290-7.
- Murdock, George P. "Ethnographic Atlas Codebook", derived from Ethnographic Atlas
- Westermarck, Edward (1922). The History of Human Marriage. New York: Allerton Book Company.
