= Ace Trucking Co. =

Comics series

Ace Garp
- Ace Garp starscan by Boo Cook; 2000 AD and Ace Garp copyright Rebellion A/S 2005.

Publication information
- Publisher: Fleetway Publications
- First appearance: 2000AD #232 (October 1981)
- Created by: John Wagner; Alan Grant; Massimo Belardinelli

In-story information
- Alter ego: Ace Garp
- Team affiliations: GBH, Feek the Freek, the Dopplegarp, Chiefy the Pig-Rat, Ghost
- Notable aliases: Garp the Barp from Parp

Ace Trucking Co. is a comedy science fiction series that featured in the British comics magazine 2000 AD from 1981 to 1986. Created by writers John Wagner and Alan Grant and artist Massimo Belardinelli, it followed the misadventures of a space trucking company headed by Ace Garp, a pointy-headed alien who spoke in a kind of futuristic CB radio slang.

The title was lifted from Ace Trucking Company, a 1970s improvisational comedy group whose membership had included Fred Willard, Patti Deutsch, Michael Mislove, George Memmoli, and Bill Saluga.

== Plot ==
Ace was the skipper of the cargo spaceship Speedo Ghost, for much of the series the Ace Trucking Co.'s only ship. His crew included his huge 'biffo' (both bodyguard and security) GBH, who believed himself to be dead, Feek the Freek, a skeletal being who acted as the ship's engineer, and the sarcastic ship's computer Ghost. Joining the crew later in the run was Chiefy the Pig-Rat, a small rodent-like creature that became Feek's best friend and missed no opportunity to insult Ace.

In later stories, the crew was also joined by a duplicate of Ace himself. The reason for this is that, tired of the series, the creators killed off Ace by having him believe that he was suffering a fatal disease, causing him to commit suicide by flying into a star. However, the popularity of the series with 2000 AD's readers caused it to be revived, the explanation being that Ace passed through a dimensional rift in the star, and ended up being discovered by his counterpart in another universe, but not before a brief detour in the offices of Tharg the Mighty in a drawer filled with other characters that had been killed off over time. Technically, the second Ace is the 'real' one from the earlier stories.

Other recurring characters were Jago Kain, the human boss of Ace's business rival Yellow Line, Cap'n Evil Blood, a space pirate who was always trying to kill Garp, Ace-hating officers Kroxley and Zagger of the Galactic Police and Fatty Arkl, a rotund alien who ended up as the skipper of Ace's second ship (Old Peart The Third).

The character's official final story "The Garpetbagger" ended with his companions GBH and Feek the Freek ordering Ace to sell up and move on, quipping that he "outlived his welcome a long time ago".

In 1988, a one-off mini-story was produced for a 2000 AD annual which featured the original Ace returning to his own universe only to find that Feek has taken over the business and GBH has become his second in command. Ace loses his temper and vandalises a bar owned by Feek which lands him in prison, vowing to gain revenge at some point "in the near future". Despite this, Ace Trucking Co would not make a reappearance in 2000 AD until 2015, when the eight-page strip Star's Truck, by Eddie Robson and Nick Dyer, was published in that year's Sci-Fi Special.

== Creators ==
The main artist for the series' run was Massimo Belardinelli, although Ian Gibson and Alberto Giolitti also contributed.

Grant and Wagner became tired of writing the series and made several attempts to end it, with one series closing with the entire crew in prison, but reader demand kept bringing it back. The later stories show clear signs of the writers' annoyance at having to keep going on a series they had lost interest in - Ace started out as a smart and resourceful character, but ended up a greedy, dim-witted buffoon disliked even by his own crew.

== Publication ==
- Ace Trucking Co. (by Alan Grant/John Wagner, with art by Massimo Belardinelli, unless noted):
  - The Complete Ace Trucking Co. Volume 1 (320 pages ISBN 1-905437-77-3) collects:
    - "The Kleggs" (in 2000 AD #232-236, 1981)
    - "Hell's Pocket" (art by Ian Gibson, in 2000 AD #239-243, 1981. Bellardinelli is incorrectly credited with the art in Prog 241)
    - "Lugjack" (in 2000 AD #244-250, 1982)
    - "The Great Mush Rush" (in 2000 AD #251-258, 1982)
    - "The Ughbug Bloos" (in 2000 AD #259, 1982)
    - "Last Lug To Abbo Dabbo" (in 2000 AD #260-267, 1982)
    - "Joobaloo" (in 2000 AD #268-272, 1982)
    - "Too Many Bams" (in 2000 AD #273-278, 1982)
    - "The Kloistar Run" (in 2000 AD #279-285, 1982)
    - "Stoop Coop Soup" (in 2000 AD #288-293, 1982)
  - The Complete Ace Trucking Co. Volume 2 (336 pages ISBN 1-905437-98-6) collects:
    - "Bamfeezled" (2000 AD Sci-Fi Special 1982)
    - "On The Dangle" (in 2000 AD #378-386, 1984. Carlos Ezquerra is incorrectly credited with the art in Prog 380)
    - "Strike!" (in 2000 AD #387-390 and 392–400, 1984-1985 Art by Giolitti progs 394–395)
    - "The Croakside Trip" (in 2000 AD #428-433, 1985)
    - "Stowaway Lugjacker" (in 2000 AD Annual 1986, 1985)
    - "Whatever Happened to Ace Garp?" (in 2000 AD #451, 1986)
    - "The Doppelgarp" (in 2000 AD #452-472, 1986)
    - "The Garpetbaggers" (in 2000 AD #475-483 and 485–498, 1986)
    - "The Homecoming" (in 2000 AD Annual 1989, 1988)
  - Uncollected:
    - "Star's Truck" (written by Eddie Robson with art by Nick Dyer, in 2000 AD Sci-Fi Special 2015)
    - "The Banned Brand Stand" (written by Eddie Robson with art by Nigel Dobbyn, in 2000 AD Sci-Fi Special 2016)
    - "The Festive Flip-Flop!" (written by Eddie Robson with art by Nigel Dobbyn, in 2000 AD #2011, 2016)
    - "Muggo's Moon" (written by Eddie Robson with art by Nigel Dobbyn, in 2000 AD #2061, 2016)
    - "Untrenched" (written by Karl Stock with art by Nick Dyer, in 2000 AD #2312, 2022)
