= Hunted (Gardner novel) =

2000 novel by James Alan Gardner

- First edition
- Author: James Alan Gardner
- Cover artist: Greg Bridges
- Language: English
- Series: League of Peoples
- Genre: Science fiction
- Publisher: Eos
- Publication date: 2000
- Publication place: Canada
- Media type: Print (Hardcover, Paperback)
- Pages: 432
- ISBN: 978-0-380-80209-8
- OCLC: 44587573
- LC Class: CPB Box no. 1862 vol. 6
- Preceded by: Vigilant
- Followed by: Ascending

Hunted is a science fiction novel written by Canadian author James Alan Gardner, and published in the year 2000 by HarperCollins Publishers under its various imprints. The novel is the fourth in Gardner's "League of Peoples" series, after Expendable (1997), Commitment Hour (1998), and Vigilant (1999).

== Synopsis ==
When new Explorer Corps recruit Edward York arrives on board the starship Willow, he abruptly becomes its sole survivor: everyone else simultaneously drops dead, executed by the near-omnipotent League of Peoples for violating its rule that anyone without sufficient respect for life is not allowed to travel between solar systems.

Alone on a ship full of corpses, Edward discovers a complex plot involving the alien Mandasars, in whose decades-long civil war he had a cryptic role.

== Reception ==
At the SF Site, Rich Horton considered it "a very fun novel to read" and a "compelling adventure story", but faulted it for overreliance on deus ex machina in its conclusion.
