= Trapped (Gardner novel) =

2002 novel by James Alan Gardner

- First edition (h/b)
- Author: James Alan Gardner
- Cover artist: Alan Pollack
- Language: English
- Series: League of Peoples
- Genre: Science fiction
- Publisher: Eos
- Publication date: 2002
- Publication place: Canada
- Media type: Print (Hardcover, Paperback)
- Pages: 416
- ISBN: 978-0-380-81330-8
- OCLC: 50765998
- LC Class: CPB Box no. 1980 vol. 15
- Preceded by: Ascending
- Followed by: Radiant

Trapped is a science fiction novel written by the Canadian author James Alan Gardner and published in 2002 by HarperCollins Publishers under its various imprints. The book is the sixth installment in Gardner's "League of Peoples" series of novels, set in the mid-25th century. While the majority of the novels in the series take place in outer space, Trapped (like Commitment Hour, the second novel in the series) is set on "Old Earth", and does not feature the series' continuing character Festina Ramos.

== Backstory ==
Trapped exploits and develops the same conceptual background that all the novels in the series employ. Around the middle of the 21st century, humanity is contacted by an extraterrestrial race connected with the League of Peoples. These beings, the Shaddills, offer humanity a bargain: humans who accept the League's cardinal rule, and refrain from fatal violence against other sentient beings, can be transported to a terraformed planet, a "New Earth", and receive the benefits of the League's advanced technologies. At first, the only humans willing to accept the bargain are those whose difficult lives leave them feeling they have nothing to lose; but in a year or two, these early adopters return to visit "Old Earth" with tales of their marvelous new lives—and the exodus begins in earnest. Over a span of two decades, most of humanity leaves for New Earth, which forms the center of an interplanetary society called the Technocracy; and the modern technological society of Old Earth collapses through depopulation. Once the Shaddills' twenty-year offer has expired, the only people left on Old Earth are those who were too violent or recalcitrant to leave.

In this state of collapse, Old Earth is vulnerable to various influences and interferences. Most notably, the planet is infested with a wide range of nanotechnology that mimics bacteria and viruses; by the 25th century, "thirty percent of all microbes on Earth...are actually nanites in disguise". These nanites generate fields that can be tapped by gifted individuals to produce effects that replicate the wonders of legend and folklore—magic and sorcery, psychic powers, even "pseudo supernatural events" like ghosts.

The chaos on Earth is finally brought under control by a mysterious group called the Spark Lords. They suppress terrorism, confiscate remaining nuclear weapons, poison gas, and biological warfare agents; they "lockdown" the planet, preventing further incursions from aliens. Members of the alien species in Gardner's fictional universe—Divians, Mandasars, Cashlings, and others—who are trapped on Earth at the time are bred as slaves, called "demons" by their human masters. The Spark Lords form a ruthless but relatively benign tyranny, "Spark Royal" or the "Spark Protectorate", that controls the worst effects of warfare and natural disasters. The rule of this small group, however, is fairly loose; they tolerate, and even cooperate with, a range of criminal organizations.

By the time of the novel's action—"One day before the spring equinox" in 2457 A.D.—humanity has settled into the lifestyle of previous centuries. Most travel is by horseback or coach; swords are far more common than guns; candles and oil lamps provide most light. Obscure religious sects flourish. Gardner's future Earth, in these respects, participates in the theme of a "medieval future" explored by writers like Jack Vance and Gene Wolfe among others. People live among the remains of past higher technologies. "Welcome to our modern world! Where OldTech computers serve as footstools, while the rusted remains of jumbo jets get converted to beer-halls and brothels."

== Plot summary ==
The novel opens with five friends out for a night of drinking and occasional brawling. All five are teachers at a less-than-first-rate boarding school called Feliss Academy, situated in the town of Simka in Feliss Province (a future version of Simcoe, Ontario, the author's hometown, and not far from the author's Waterloo current home). Future versions of other real locations, such as Niagara Falls, Port Dover, and the Port Dover mausoleum appear in the novel.

The five, frustrated and bored with their unsatisfactory lives, are:

- Sir Pelinor, the school's fencing instructor, who fancies himself a courtly knight;
- Sister Impervia, the self-defense trainer, and a Handmaid of the Holy Order of Magdalenes;
- the Steel Caryatid, sorceress, psychic, and gifted in pyrokinesis;
- Myoko Namida, whose specialty is telekinesis and levitation;
- and Philemon Abu Dhubhai, Ph.D., the novel's narrator, a scientist and the scion of a wealthy and powerful family in the Middle East.

Tonight, however, is an unusual night: the Steel Caryatid has received a premonition that the group will undertake a quest. The quest reveals itself when Dhubhai encounters a ghost and learns that one student at the school has been murdered while another, the victim's boyfriend, has runoff. The group embarks on a search for the missing boy, which soon transforms into something far more sinister: a hunt for a shape-shifting alien creature, malevolent and very dangerous. The group expands with new recruits, then is whittled down by deaths along the route, as the search comes to involve aliens, a crazy and highly lethal Spark Lord, and a criminal gang nearly as bad. Their quarry, the runaway boy, turns out to be one of the most gifted psychics the world has ever known, which adds a new layer of complexity to their dilemma. Dhubhai and his surviving companions reach a bloody crisis in the basement of the power station at Niagara Falls, one of the few places on Earth that still maintains electric power and traces of OldTech civilization. Dhubhai learns that Spark Royal has kept the power flowing in order to imprison an alien force; the sinister being they have been following is only a small offshoot of a much greater and darker whole. Dhubhai discovers more than he anticipated about the cryptic workings of the League of Peoples before the alien force is controlled.
