= Dynamite Chicken =

1971 film by Ernest Pintoff

- dvd cover for Dynamite Chicken
- Directed by: Ernest Pintoff
- Written by: Ernest Pintoff
- Produced by: Ernest Pintoff
- Starring: Richard Pryor; Ace Trucking Company; Paul Krassner
- Production company: Dynamite Productions
- Distributed by: Walter Reade Organization
- Release date: January 20, 1971
- Running time: 76 minutes
- Country: United States
- Language: English

Dynamite Chicken is a 1971 American comedy film. Described in its opening credits as "an electronic magazine of American pop culture", it presents a series of interviews, stand-up comedy, countercultural sketches, documentary segments, and agitprop relating to the peace movement, based around a stream-of-consciousness free-form format.

Inspired by his experience making the TV documentary This is Marshall McLuhan for NBC, director Ernest Pintoff envisioned Dynamite Chicken as a collage to capture the hot-button issues of the moment. "I became interested in McLuhan and his theories of bombarding the audience with images...it seems to me the best way to impart a maximum of information to people."

The original segments involving Richard Pryor, Paul Krassner, the comedy group Ace Trucking Company and other figures were shot in 1969 and mostly improvised. Archival footage of other major celebrities of the day and repurposed film trailers is peppered throughout. The total budget for the production was $225,000.

He would state, "There's no message in the film, except for my point of view when I was making it." In another interview, he explained the title by saying, "I overheard someone say, 'I make dynamite chicken.' I liked it. You know, a chicken seems so little and the other so explosive. It's a silly title that doesn't mean too much. The film doesn't mean too much either. I hope people will respond. I had fun making it."

== Sketches ==
- Cold Opening - a text crawl in a typewriter-style font details a complaint filed with the American Civil Patrol about a Richard Pryor performance and the offensive words used therein, including "fart," followed by Pryor delivering jokes about farts in a playground. (There is a copyright line in the text crawl for "Through a Looking Glass Productions" with a Roman-numeraled credit year of 1982, suggesting this may be a new addition to the previous edit created by Pintoff in 1970, possibly added by Seymour Borde & Associates)
- Introduction - an overweight man (George Memmoli) exits an SRO hotel, underscored by "Also sprach Zarathustra*, and while walking away, scratches his rear end. Pryor then brays the title of the movie, and continues his thoughts. (Pryor material reappears throughout the film)
- Credits - the names of the artists appearing either in original segments or in archive footage play out underscored by "Mummy Doesn't Live Here Anymore (The Chicken Song)" by Tony Hendra & Nick Ullett, periodically intercut with random images and clips. Text proclaims, "A contemporary probe and commentary on the mores and maladies of our age...with schtick, bits, pieces, girls, a (Burger King Whopper) hamburger, a little hair, a lady, some fellas, some religious stuff, and a lot of other things."
- Post Coitum - dim footage and audio initially suggests a couple lighting up cigarettes after sex, but several lighter flashes reveals that there are many people in the bed. Performed by Ace Trucking Company
- Contrasts - Snippets of Sha-Na-Na undercut political sound bites from Paul Krassner, Pryor (performing material later reprised in his segments of Wattstax), and Malcolm X.
- What is Obscene - A naked woman on a stage asks, "What is obscene." The overweight man (Memmoli) from the prologue goes to a phone booth, and attempts an obscene phone call, grunting into the receiver while an operator (Patti Deutsch) attempts to make out where he wants his call. Al Goldstein and Jim Buckley of Screw Magazine discuss the mandate of their publication. The obscene caller reaches another woman, leaving a message of grunts.
- Prophets - Frank Lauria recites one of his poems.
- Meat and Potatoes - the staff and customers of a Burger King franchise location explain the details of their conduct of business and consumption, as a typical day is depicted.
- The New Feminists - an introduction of a tampon removed from its sheath and the "string" is lit (a firework fuse) introducing female members of the Redstockings collective discussing sexual inequities.
- Norma Jean - another Frank Lauria poem
- Actor's Nightmare - Ace Trucking Company perform a sketch where a talent agent (Fred Willard) and his assistant (Deutsch) are forcefully accosted by a desperate actor (Michael Mislove) looking for work. However, when the agent asks him to do a cold reading from a script about a desperate actor looking for work, the actor is unable to summon the same real-life intensity.
- Andy Warhol tape records Ondine reading from Warhol's book a, A Novel, and interviews members of the Mattachine Society.
- The Groupies - audio excerpts from The Groupies album is played over images of groupies.
- What I'm Doing Here - Leonard Cohen reads his poem.
- Small Spoleto Mantra - Allen Ginsberg reads a poem underscored by Jimi Hendrix's "Foxy Lady" augmented by sexually charged drawings.
- Sex and Art: Audition - a naked actress auditions for Electra, but after delivering lines in a modern New York affect, is dismissed for being "not Greek enough". When given a second read for a Shakespearean play, she is again dismissed for jiggling too much. After a third opportunity for Cinderella, she is rejected for having small breasts.
- The Commercial - Ace Trucking Company perform a sketch where a temperamental fey actor (Bill Saluga) holds up an Aqua Velva commercial by his complaints and inability to appear butch on camera. The sketch is followed by news footage of Joe Namath crying while announcing his retirement.
- Hair - British hairstylist John DeConey discusses the thought process of men choosing to wear their hair long.
- Flag - after an introduction featuring manipulated audio by Richard Nixon, citizens opine on what the American flag means to them.
- Phoebe Zeit-Geist - Michael O'Donoghue narrates a cliffhanger installment of his bondage-themed comic strip The Adventures of Phoebe Zeit-Geist, described as "a continuing chronicle of grief, misery, and despair."
- Drug Reunion - Ace Trucking Company perform a sketch where a hippie (Saluga) is busted by a narcotics officer (Willard) who discovers they were classmates in high school.
- Cojones - O'Donoghue delivers a ultra-masculine pitch for cigarettes.
- Support Your Local Police - two intersecting sketches from the Revolting Theatre, one involving police officer Sgt. Paul (Tuli Kupferberg) demonstrating irritant gases on masked subjects (Lannes Kenfield, Sylvia Topp), while a sponsor, "Yippie Helmets," presents a pitchman (Marshall Efron) demonstrating the destructive abilities of a policeman's truncheon and the protection afforded by his product on a typical Yippie (Lisa Ryan).
- Home of the Brave - the original trailer for the 1949 WWII drama Home of the Brave segues into audio of a segment of Lenny Bruce's "Politics" routine about jingoism, followed by the last portions of Joan Baez performing "Carry it On," and Al Kooper using a microphone, to create audio feedback, on a home stereo system, proclaiming, "And that's how rock'n'roll is born."
- LBJ - Jay Garner portrays President Lyndon B. Johnson while underscored by audio material performed by Lenny Bruce. A snippet of the trailer for One Minute to Zero follows.
- Contrasts/Flag (reprise) - more citizens offer their opinions of patriotism.
- God Loves Rock'n'Roll - a priest (Ron Carey) exits from a limo, and does a freestyle dance in front of New York's St. Patrick Cathedral to the song "God Loves Rock'n'Roll" by Lionel Goldbart.
- Sister Filomena - O'Donoghue introduces "direct from Rome, Italy," Filomena, a stripteasing nun.
- Revolution - musings from Krassner, Pryor, archival footage of John Lennon & Yoko Ono's "Bed-In", and Joan Baez with David Friedman, on leading people.
- Finale - the obscene phone caller (Memmoli) is caught in a phone booth by a detective (Roy Bond). He demands his right to call his lawyer, but upon making the call, only leaves a heavy breathing message.

== Cast ==
(as originally billed in the initial 1971 advertising)

- Richard Pryor
- Paul Krassner
- Ace Trucking Company
  - Patti Deutsch
  - Michael Mislove
  - Bill Saluga
  - George Memmoli
  - Fred Willard
  - Roy Bond
- Lenny Bruce
- Rhinoceros
- Ron Carey
- Tuli Kupferberg
- Sylvia Topp
- Lannes Kenfield
- Sha Na Na
- Peter Max
- Joan Baez

== Reception ==
Dynamite Chicken was originally screened only on college campuses, serviced by specialty company EYR (Educational Youth Recreation), who had also handled initial screenings of L. M. Kit Carson's documentary The American Dreamer. "It was initially booked in 35 schools," Pintoff told San Francisco Examiner film critic Stanley Eichelbaum, "And the response was so good, we thought we should try a theatrical run." The Walter Reade Organization acquired the film and began releasing it in cinemas in January 1971.

The San Francisco Examiner called the film "a blue version of "Laugh-In" that bombards us with a collage of political protest, hip sloganeering and sophomoric nonsense...It strikes me as insincere, inadequate, and superficial in its entire approach to the comedy of dissent." Kevin Thomas of the Los Angeles Times was more positive, saying "Pintoff, always in control of his wide-ranging material, remains an oasis of sanity in the eyes of the storm...Pintoff is fresh and disciplined in the choice of images he bombards us with."

Abraham H. Weiler of The New York Times wrote: "Like its pertinent four letter words and nudes, Dynamite Chicken may be fun and games on occasion but it's hardly a shocking revelation these days. Since it was aimed at the college circuits, where it has been shown for some time, Dynamite Chicken briefly employs the talents of practically everyone adored by the campus crowd, from Joan Baez to Andy Warhol, in skits, songs and on its sound track."

== Legacy ==
The "magazine" format of blending comedy, unusual documentary coverage, and music featured in Dynamite Chicken would serve as the template for the subsequent WNET variety series The Great American Dream Machine, on which Chicken co-star Marshall Efron was a contributing writer. Ken Shapiro, another contributor to the show, would perform a improvisational dance on New York City streets, similar to the Ron Carey priest sketch, in his own comedy project The Groove Tube. Members of Ace Trucking Company would participate in the 1976 sketch comedy film Tunnel Vision, which featured a stripteasing nun segment similar to the "Sister Filomena" sketch.

In 1982, Seymour Borde & Associates reissued Dynamite Chicken to theatres and drive-ins, with a new ad campaign, poster, and trailer, that focused almost entirely on Richard Pryor's presence, capitalizing on the success of Columbia Pictures' concert film Richard Pryor: Live on the Sunset Strip. Pryor was upset with the campaign's misleading tone suggesting that it was a new film and not a reissue, and that he was the star when his contribution only amounted to 10 total minutes, and initially filed a $6 million lawsuit to stop its distribution until the ads were changed. Los Angeles Superior Court Judge John Cole issued a preliminary restraining order to the distributors on November 13, 1982, and ruled on December 2 in Pryor's favor, saying that the campaign must be corrected to properly reflect Pryor's limited role.

Despite the ruling, almost all subsequent video releases of Dynamite Chicken have centered Pryor as a primary star of the film.

== See also ==
- List of American films of 1971
