= Ray Jay =

Ray Jay may refer to:

- Ray J. Johnson, a character created by comedian Bill Saluga
- Ray J, American performer
- Raymond James Stadium or the Ray Jay, a multi-purpose football stadium in Tampa, Florida
