= Ascending =

2001 novel by James Alan Gardner

- First edition (h/b)
- Author: James Alan Gardner
- Cover artist: Luis Royo
- Language: English
- Series: League of Peoples
- Genre: Science fiction
- Publisher: Eos
- Publication date: 2001
- Publication place: Canada
- Media type: Print (Hardcover, Paperback)
- Pages: 384
- ISBN: 978-0-380-81329-2
- OCLC: 48251831
- Preceded by: Hunted
- Followed by: Trapped

Ascending is a science fiction novel by the Canadian writer James Alan Gardner, published in 2001 by HarperCollins Publishers under its various imprints. It is the fifth novel in Gardner's "League of Peoples" series. It is a direct sequel to the first novel in the series, Expendable, in that it picks up the dual story of Festina Ramos, Explorer turned admiral, and the transparent glass woman Oar, where the earlier novel left off.

== Backstory ==
Through the course of Ascending, Gardner adds depth, detail, and perspective to the conceptual background he has established for the "League of Peoples" series. In particular, he explains how human beings and other species in the galaxy are contacted by, and become a part of, the larger galactic community.

Sometime in the middle of the 21st century, humanity encounters a mysterious group of beings who call themselves merely "citizens of the League of Peoples;" others call them the Shaddill. The Shaddill explain the grand design of the League: sentient species who renounce the use of fatal violence against other sentients can join the League and share in its wealth of advanced technologies, including terraformed planets, genetic engineering, "star drives" for effective interstellar travel, highly advanced medicine, and other advantages. The Shaddill offer to transport humans to a terraformed New Earth where none of the old problems of the "old Earth" will exist. Their offer stands open for twenty years. At first only the most disadvantaged and unhappy members of human society take the Shaddill up on their offer; but when they return to visit Earth in a year or two with tales of their wonderful new lives, the exodus increases— which causes more and more problems for those who remain behind. By the time the Shaddill's 20-year offer expires, the only people left on Old Earth are those too stubborn or violent to make the leap to a new society, and who must subsist in the collapsed remains of the old.

By the end of the novel, however, it becomes clear that the Shaddill have been offering a Faustian bargain: the beneficiaries of their largesse employ technologies they do not really understand, the full consequences of which they cannot perceive. The true motives of the Shaddill turn out to be far less benign and magnanimous than anyone had suspected.

== Plot summary ==
The novel opens with "A Word About Oar", a brief recap of the earlier story. At the end of Expendable, Festina left the apparently deceased Oar lying in one of the Towers of Ancestors on her planet, where her people absorb high-energy radiations that sustain their lives. At the start of Ascending, Oar regains consciousness in the tower where Festina left her, to find that she is being accosted by a diminutive and odd-looking orange being. This is Uclodda Unorr, a professional smuggler who has been hired to gather evidence on past misdeeds of the Technocracy's Outward Fleet—and who is surprised to discover that Oar is alive. He informs her that four years have passed since Festina left Melaquin, which makes the year 2456 A.D. Unorr has been sent to gather evidence before representatives of the Outward Fleet can arrive to destroy or conceal it; thanks to Festina's activities, a scandal has erupted that will expose the corruption of the High Council of Admirals (events recounted in Gardner's Hunted). Unorr and Oar find it in their interest to escape the planet forthwith; but as they and Unorr's large and muscular (but demur) wife Lajooli are leaving in a bioneural spacecraft, they are confronted by the Shaddill, who have come to use Oar's corpse in an experiment and are also surprised that she is alive.

The little party of Oar, Unorr, and Lajooli manage to escape from the Shaddill for the present; and so they find themselves fleeing across space from both the Shaddill and the Outward Fleet. In the process, Oar is contacted mentally by a very strange alien being who calls himself the Pollisand; he, or it, has a form resembling a headless white rhinoceros, but seems to be one of the very advanced and cryptic galactic beings who exist far above the mundane material level. The Pollisand claims responsibility for Oar's recovery from death; and it, or he, enlists Oar's help in a grand plan to destroy the Shaddill. Oar lets her animus outweigh her suspicion, and agrees to work with him.

Fortunately, Admiral Ramos is also rushing to Melaquin to prevent the destruction of evidence; Oar and friends detect her approach and race to the Admiral's ship to escape the pursuing Shaddill. They sacrifice their own ship to incapacitate the Shaddill's enormous vessel (though only temporarily), and are rescued by the humans. Festina is astonished to find that Oar is "alive and causing trouble again".

Trouble, however, approaches from all sides. The Outward Fleet has been deeply corrupted from the top down, and Festina's ship is soon sabotaged by a rather incompetent saboteur. Indeed, it becomes clear that the human society of New Earth, which calls itself the Technocracy, is rife with incompetence and corruption on all levels—part of a pattern of degeneracy that is afflicting other societies helped by the Shaddill, societies that have grown increasingly "decadent, temperamental, and culturally sterile", and filled with "wicked, arrogant, self-centered" individuals.

Festina tries to rescue the situation by contacting an eccentric and unpleasant species called the Cashlings; but before her plan can succeed, humans and Cashlings, Oar and Uclod and all are captured by the technologically overwhelming Shaddill. Human and Melaquin resourcefulness, however, manage to outwit and outmaneuver the enemy; Oar and Festina learn the secrets behind the Shaddill's malicious manipulation of humanity and other species. Oar triumphs over her adversaries, and also fulfills her bargain with the Pollisand, who in turn presents her with a remedy for the "Tired Brain" syndrome that leaves her people comatose in the Towers of Ancestors. With a new maturity of her own, she brings the cure back to Melaquin, becoming something very close to the savior of her people. Festina is more than a little amazed at the change in her old friend, back from the dead.
