= The Harrad Experiment (novel) =

1966 novel by Robert Rimmer

- Author: Robert Rimmer
- Language: English
- Genre: Fiction
- Publication date: 1966
- Publication place: United States

The Harrad Experiment is a 1966 novel written by Robert Rimmer. The novel was made into a film in 1973 followed by a 1974 sequel.

== Plot ==
Written diary-style by four fictional college students, Stanley, Harry, Sheila and Beth, who explore intimate sexual relationships that challenge society's norms.
