= Emmaline Henry =

American actress (1928–1979)

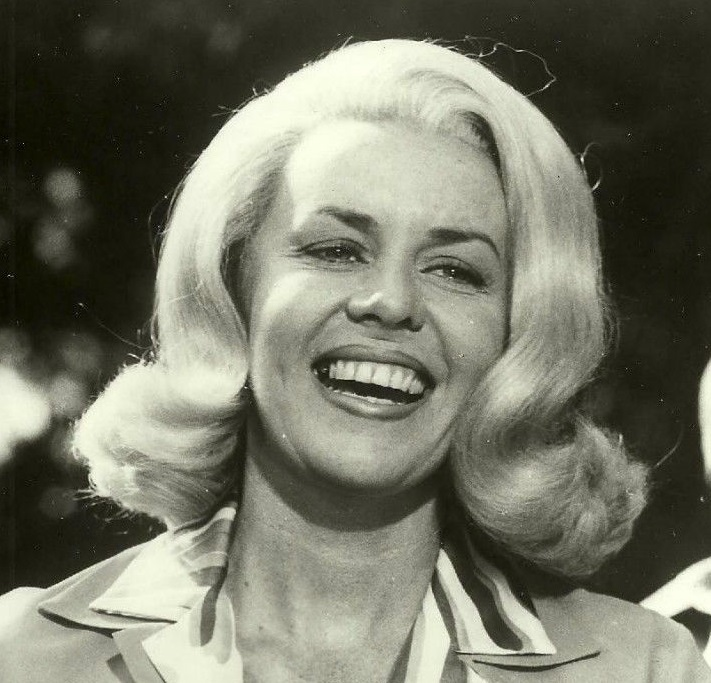
- Henry in 1964
- Born: November 1, 1928; Philadelphia, Pennsylvania, U.S.
- Died: October 8, 1979 (aged 50); Palm Springs, California, U.S.
- Resting place: Holy Cross Cemetery, Culver City
- Occupation: Actress
- Years active: 1954–1979, her death
- Spouse: Mark Roberts (m. 1969; div. 1974)

Emmaline Henry (November 1, 1928 – October 8, 1979) was an American actress best known for playing Amanda Bellows, the wife of Dr. Alfred Bellows, on the hit 1960s situation comedy I Dream of Jeannie.

== Career ==
Henry first appeared during the first season of I Dream of Jeannie, 1965, episode #18, "Is There An Extra Genie In the House?" playing a magician's assistant named "Myrt". She then made 33 appearances as Amanda Bellows until the fifth and final season in 1970.

Henry began her career as a singer, appearing on local radio in her teens. She went to Hollywood in the early 1950s and found her way into the choruses of several musicals. Producers began noticing, however, that her comic skills were superior to her singing. She toured in musicals like Top Banana, and later appeared in the film version of the show. She succeeded Carol Channing in the play Gentlemen Prefer Blondes.

Henry made her television debut in a 1955 episode of the ZIV production, I Led Three Lives. This was followed by appearances in another ZIV TV show, as a gun moll robber in Highway Patrol. She appeared on The Red Skelton Show in 1961 and, subsequently, made guest appearances on various sitcoms, including The Farmer's Daughter, The Munsters and Petticoat Junction. Her first starring role was as John Astin's wife in I'm Dickens, He's Fenster. In 1964–65, she appeared as Mickey Rooney's wife, Nora, in the short-lived sitcom Mickey and a guest appearance on Bonanza (1969).

She also made feature film appearances in Divorce American Style (1967), Rosemary's Baby (1968) and Harrad Summer (1974).

Following the cancellation of I Dream of Jeannie in 1970, Henry guest-starred on other sitcoms, including Love, American Style, The Bob Newhart Show, and in the dramatic television mini-series Backstairs at the White House. In 1971 she guest-starred in the final episode of Green Acres playing Lillian Grant, the sister of Oliver's former secretary Carol Rush (Elaine Joyce). The episode was a backdoor pilot that was rejected by CBS. On Three's Company, she appeared in the recurring role of Chrissy's boss, J.C. Braddock. Her final appearance was the Eight Is Enough episode "I Do, I Do, I Do, I Do ", which first aired on September 19, 1979, just 21 days before her death in October 1979.

== Personal life ==
Henry married actor Mark Roberts on November 1, 1969. They divorced in 1974.

== Death ==
Henry died of a brain tumor on October 8, 1979, at the age of 50, 23 days before her 51st birthday. She is interred at the Holy Cross Cemetery in Culver City, California.

== Filmography ==
=== Movies ===
Year	Title	Role	Notes
1954	Top Banana	Singer	Uncredited
1954	Lucky Me	Party Guest	Uncredited
1964	Marnie	Minor Role	Uncredited
1967	Divorce American Style	Fern Blandsforth	
1968	Rosemary's Baby	Elise Dunstan	
1974	Harrad Summer	Margaret Tonhausen	

=== Television ===
Year	Title	Role	Notes
1955	I Led 3 Lives	Comrade Martha	Episode: "Trapped"
1956-1958	Highway Patrol	Sally Warren / Gloria Burgess / Margaret Mason	Episodes: "Hitchhiker Dies" & "Lady Bandits"
1961	Lock-Up	Marion Green	Episode: "Design for Murder"
1961-1970	The Red Skelton Show	Various Roles	13 episodes
1962-1963	I'm Dickens, He's Fenster	Kate Dickens	32 episodes
1964-1965	Mickey	Nora Grady	17 episodes
1965	The Munsters	Gwendolyn the Accident-Prone Wife	Episode: "Herman, Coach of the Year"
1966	Petticoat Junction	Nancy Anderson	Episode: "Second Honeymoon"
1966	The Farmer's Daughter	Sara	Episodes: "Simple Joys of Nature" & "Is He or Isn't He?"
1966	The Double Life of Henry Phyfe	Alexandra	Episode: "Phyfe Goes Skiing"
1966-1970	I Dream of Jeannie	Amanda Bellows / Myrt	35 episodes
1969	Mayberry R.F.D.	Mrs. Wylie	Episode: "New Couple in Town"
1969	The Governor & J.J.	Leslie Torrance	Episode: "Romeo and J.J."
1969	Love, American Style	Pamela	Segment: "Love and the Busy Husband"
1969	Bonanza	Miss Sprague	Episode: "Abner Willoughby's Return"
1971	Green Acres	Lillian Grant	Episode: "The Ex-Secretary"
1972	The Great American Tragedy		TV movie
1972	The Bob Newhart Show	Mrs. Walker	Episode: "The Two Loves of Dr. Hartley"
1974	The Wide World of Mystery	Esther Leyden	Episode: "Nightmare at 43 Hillcrest"
1976	The Streets of San Francisco	Ginger Matson	Episode: "No Minor Vices"
1977	Police Woman	Jan	Episode: "Shark"
1977	Barnaby Jones	Sadie	Episode: "Run Away to Terror"
1978	What Really Happened to the Class of '65?	Louise Demming	Episode: "The Most Likely to Succeed"
1978	The Love Boat	Love Interest for 'Billy Boy'	Episode: "Rocky/Julie's Dilemma/Who's Who?"
1978-1979	Three's Company	J.C. Braddock	Episodes: "Chrissy's New Boss" & "The Catered Affair"
1979	Backstairs at the White House	Lady	Episode: "#1.4"
1979	Eight Is Enough	Sylvia McArthur	Episode: "I Do, I Do, I Do, I Do", (final appearance)
