= The Congress of Wonders =

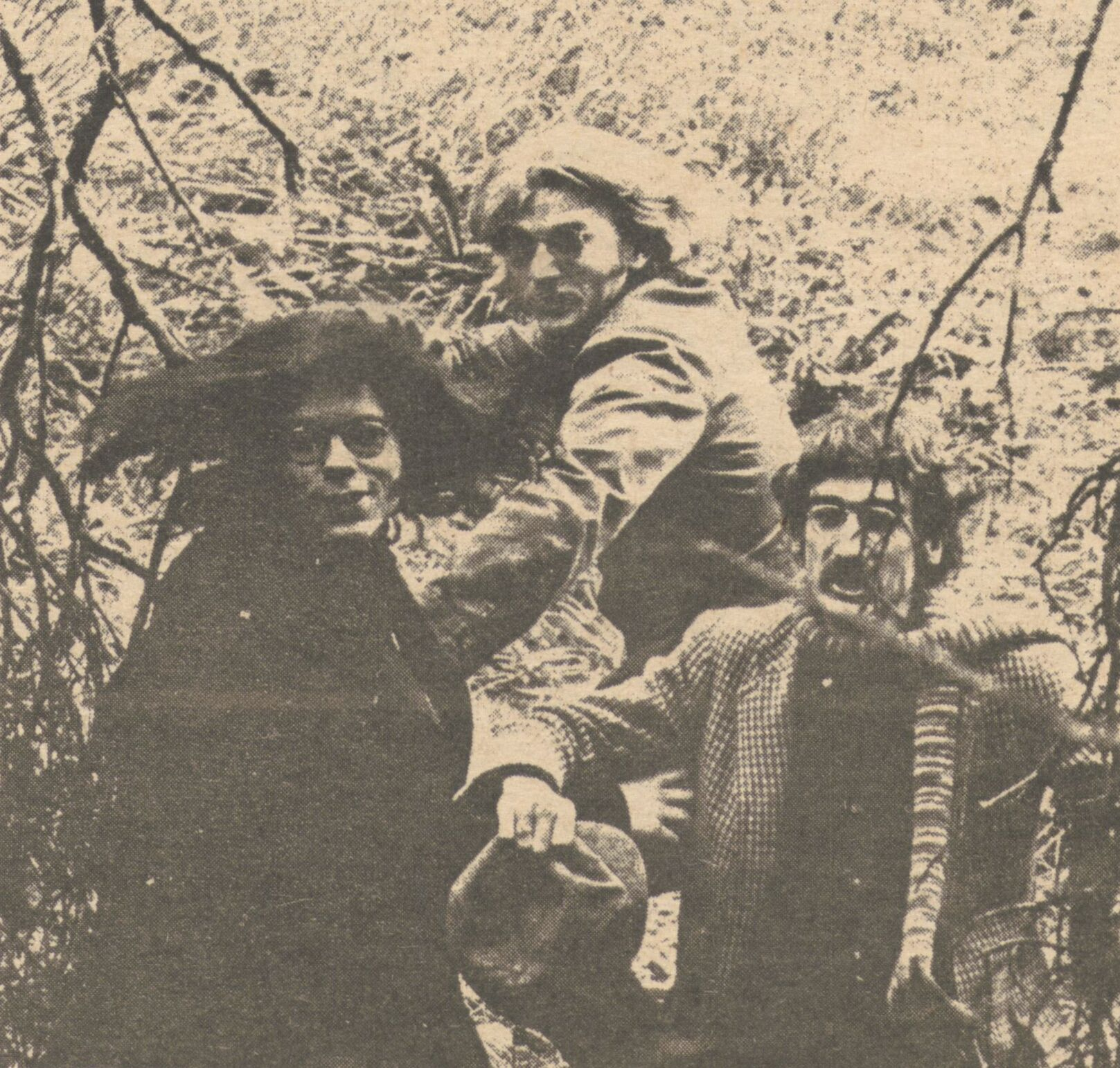
The Congress of Wonders in 1968

The Congress of Wonders was an American comedy duo from the San Francisco Bay Area, active in the late 1960s and early 1970s. The duo consisted of Howard Kerr, who performed as Karl Truckload, and Richard Rollins, who performed as Winslow Thrill. They performed in Bay Area music venues and released two comedy albums on the Fantasy label, Revolting and Sophomoric.

== History ==
The Congress of Wonders emerged from the San Francisco Bay Area counterculture and comedy scene. A 2021 retrospective in Copper described the act as a performing and recording duo that opened at music venues for rock bands including Quicksilver Messenger Service and Big Brother and the Holding Company.

In 1968, the Congress of Wonders performed at the Berkeley Folk Music Festival opening concert in Sproul Plaza, an event documented in Northwestern University's Berkeley Folk Music Festival Archive.

== Recordings and reception ==
The duo released two albums on Fantasy Records in the early 1970s: Revolting and Sophomoric. In a 1971 review of Revolting for the Appleton Post-Crescent, the reviewer identified the members of Congress of Wonders as Richard Rollins, performing as Winslow Thrill, and Howard Kerr, performing as Karl Truckload. The review described Rollins and Kerr as performers who had developed comedy material in coffee houses, theaters, and television, and contrasted their recorded work with comedy groups such as The Firesign Theatre, The Second City, and Ace Trucking Company.

A second 1971 review, published in The Prospector, said the duo had performed at the University of California and in San Francisco venues including the Avalon and the Family Dog. The Post-Crescent review praised Revolting as a funny comedy album and described the duo's work as including improvisation, voices, characters, jokes, and multi-linear performances. A later Copper retrospective described Revolting as stronger than Sophomoric, singling out the tracks "Star Trip" and "Pigeon Park".
