= Patti Deutsch =

American actress (1943–2017)

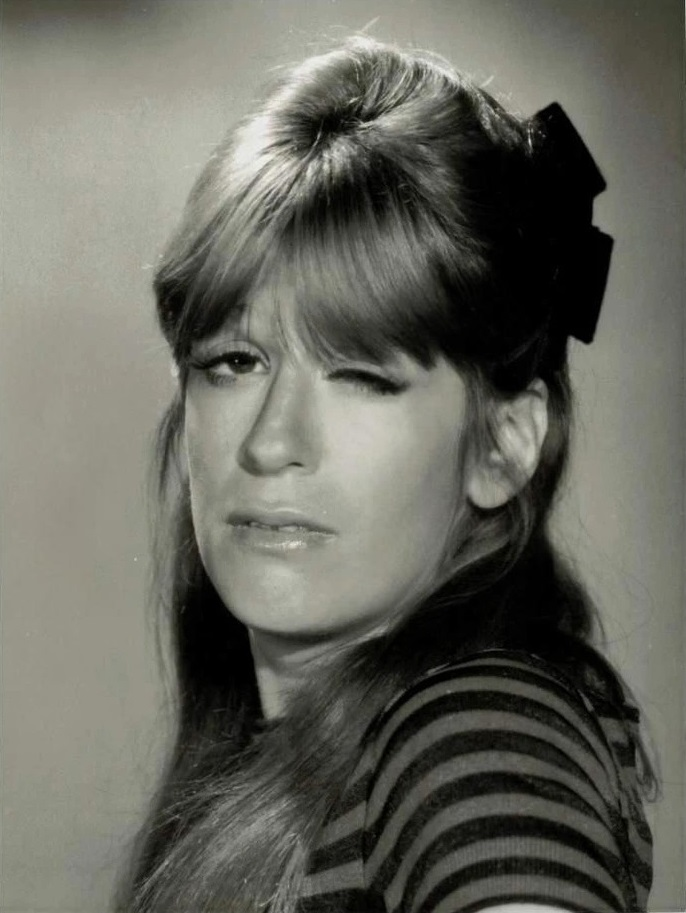
- Deutsch in Rowan & Martin's Laugh-In (1972)
- Born: Elaine Patricia Deutsch; December 16, 1943; Pittsburgh, Pennsylvania, U.S.
- Died: July 26, 2017 (aged 73); Los Angeles, California, U.S.
- Occupation: Actress
- Years active: 1968–2013
- Spouse: Donald Ross (m. 1968)
- Children: 3

Patricia Deutsch Ross (born Elaine Patricia Deutsch; December 16, 1943 – July 26, 2017) was an American actress who was known as a recurring panelist on the 1970s game shows Match Game and Tattletales.

== Early life ==
Deutsch was born in Pittsburgh, Pennsylvania. She graduated from Taylor Allderdice High School in 1961. She then attended Bennington College, Carnegie Mellon, the University of Texas at Austin, and the University of Southern California within a four-year period.

== Career ==
=== Stage ===
Early in her career, Deutsch starred in local productions of Neil Simon's California Suite at La Mirada and Long Beach. She also worked alongside Sid Caesar "as his new Imogene Coca" at the Rainbow Grill in New York City. In 1969, Deutsch was in the musical Free Fall.

=== Improv ===
In the 1960s and early 1970s, Deutsch was a member of Ace Trucking Company, an improvisational comedy group whose members also included Bill Saluga, Fred Willard, George Memmoli, and Michael Mislove. Ace Trucking Company performed regularly on This Is Tom Jones and The Tonight Show with Johnny Carson, and also recorded a sketch album with RCA. She has stated she was the original “Truckette”.

=== Television ===
From 1972 to 1973, Deutsch was a regular cast member on the final season of Rowan & Martin's Laugh-In, where she worked with her future fellow Match Game panelist Richard Dawson.

From 1973 to 1979, Deutsch was a recurring celebrity panelist on Match Game, and became a popular fixture in the number six seat. She also occasionally appeared on Tattletales with her husband.

In 1978, Deutsch appeared in the short-lived television series Grandpa Goes to Washington.

During the 1980s, she continued to guest-star on episodes of series such as Moonlighting and She's the Sheriff. Her final television credit was a guest role in the ABC series Don't Trust the B— in Apartment 23.

==== Guest appearances ====
In addition to The Tonight Show with Johnny Carson, Deutsch also had guest appearances on The Merv Griffin Show, The Dick Cavett Show and The Steve Allen Show. On March 7, 2008, she appeared as a guest on GSN's interstitial program GSN Live.

In 2009, Deutsch, along with fellow Match Game irregular (non-permanent) panelists Joyce Bulifant and Nancy Dussault, attended the Game Show Network's Game Show Awards to accept the "Favorite Classic Game Show" award on behalf of Match Game. During their acceptance speeches, Deutsch, Bulifant and Dussault fondly remembered host Gene Rayburn and permanent panelist Charles Nelson Reilly, both of whom had died.

=== Voice acting ===
During the early years of the show The Electric Company, Deutsch did voice-over work for some of the vignette cartoons with actor and show writer Paul Dooley.

In the 1980s and 1990s, Deutsch did regular voice work for Hanna Barbera in both The Smurfs and Capitol Critters cartoon series. She provided the voice for Mrs. Dave, the mother of Dr. Dave, on the popular Nickelodeon cartoon As Told by Ginger. She also had occasional voice roles in other popular cartoon series, such as Darkwing Duck.

Her later work included movie voice-overs for Tarzan; The Emperor's New Groove; Monsters, Inc. and Happily N'Ever After.

=== Commercials ===
Over the course of her career, Deutsch appeared in hundreds of local and national commercials, including classic spots for Folgers coffee and Charmin bathroom tissue. She also appeared in commercials for M&M Meat Shops, a Canadian food retailer.

== Personal life ==
During her improv years, Deutsch met her future husband, comedy screenwriter and playwright Donald Ross. They married in 1968 and had three children: sons Max Ross and Lee Sachnoff, and daughter Alexis (Ross) Hill. Both Deutsch and Ross appeared the same week as guests on Match Game '74.

Deutsch died of cancer on July 26, 2017, at age 73, at her home in Los Angeles. Her widower, Donald Ross (June 18, 1942 – June 1, 2018), also died of cancer.

== Filmography ==
=== Film ===
Year	Title	Character	Director(s)	Notes	ref
1971	Dynamite Chicken	Herself, with The Ace Trucking Company	Ernest Pintoff	Comedy film	
1981	New Friends	Herself (voice)	Diane Kenna	Animated short film	
1983	Mr. Mom	Deli Girl	Stan Dragoti	Comedy film	
1990	Jetsons: The Movie	Lucy-2 (voice)	Joseph Barbera; William Hanna	Animated science fiction comedy film Based on the animated television series The Jetsons by Hanna-Barbera.	
1999	Tarzan	Tantor's Mother (voice)	Chris Buck; Kevin Lima	Animated adventure film Based on the 1912 story Tarzan of the Apes by Edgar Rice Burroughs	
2000	The Land Before Time VII: The Stone of Cold Fire	Rainbow Face #2 (voice)	Charles Grosvenor	Animated adventure musical drama film	
2000	The Emperor's New Groove	Mata, the diner waitress (voice)	Mark Dindal	Animated comedy film	
2001	Monsters, Inc.	Photo Couple #1 (voice)	Pete Docter; David Silverman; Lee Unkrich	Animated fantasy comedy film	
2005	Kronk's New Groove	Mata (voice)	Saul Blinkoff; Elliot M. Bour	Animated musical comedy film	
2006	Happily N'Ever After	Various voices	Paul Bolger	Animated fantasy adventure comedy film	
2008	Immigrants	Greta Knight (English version, voice)	Gabor Csupo	Adult animated comedy film Also known as Immigrants - Jóska menni Amerika in Hungarian	

=== Television ===
Year	Title	Character	Notes	ref
1968	The Dick Cavett Show	Herself	2 episodes	
1968	What's My Line?	Herself	5 episodes	
1968–69	The Merv Griffin Show	Herself	9 episodes	
1969–71	This Is Tom Jones	Various	Regular performer with Ace Trucking Company	
1969	The Mike Douglas Show	Herself	Season 8: Episode 130	
1972	The John Byner Comedy Hour	Herself	4 episodes	
1972	Safeguard: Beige Deodorant and Antibacterial Soap	Cab Driver (uncredited)	Commercial directed by Robert Sallin	
1972	The Hollywood Squares	Herself	Episode dated October 30	
1972–73	Rowan and Martin's Laugh-In	Various	Regular performer	
1972–73	The Tonight Show Starring Johnny Carson	Self	7 episodes	
1973	Big Daddy	Guest	Made-for-TV movie directed by Norman Tokar	
1973	The Girl with Something Extra	Sudy	Episode: "It's So Peaceful in the Country"	
1973	The Vin Scully Show	Self	Season 1: Episode 43	
1973–79	Match Game	Herself	212 episodes	
1973–74	The Midnight Special	Self with Ace Trucking Company	3 episodes	
1974	Slither	Ruthie	Made-for-TV movie directed by Daryl Duke	
1974	Celebrity Sweepstakes	Self	6 episodes	
1974	Shakespeare Loves Rembrandt	Guest	Made-for-TV movie directed by Peter Baldwin	
1974	Password	Self	4 episodes	
1974–77; 1982–84	Tattletales	Herself	46 episodes 2 episodes	
1975–80	Match Game PM	Self	23 episodes	
1976	The Cross-Wits	Self	Episode: "Bill Cullen, Fannie Flagg, Patti Deutsch, Jack Carter"	
1977	Liar's Club	Self	Episode: "William Shatner, Patti Deutsch, Dick Gautier, Larry Hovis"	
1978–79	Grandpa Goes to Washington	Patti	Main cast	
1979	Beat the Clock	Self	5 episodes	
1980	A Cry for Love	Guest	Made-for-TV- movie directed by Paul Wendkos	
1983	Imagine That	Self	2 episodes	
1984–88	The Smurfs	Various voices	7 episodes	
1987	Bustin' Loose	Emma Wilmer	Episode: "Rain, Rain, Go Away"	
1987	She's the Sheriff	Guest	Episode: "The Perils of Pauline"	
1989	Moonlighting	Secretary	Episode: "In 'N Outlaws"	
1991	Darkwing Duck	Poetry Reader/Woman (voice)	Episode: "Days of Blunder"	
1992	Capitol Critters	Trixie (voice)	13 episodes	
1994	The Mommies	Mrs. Drummond	Episode: "Five Minutes Apart"	
1994	Bobby's World	Sally (voice)	Episode: "One Clump or Two"	
1995	Life with Louie	Sylvia (voice)	Episode: "The Fourth Thursday in November"	
1995	Santo Bugito	Betty Wolfenspider (voice)	Episode: "The Carnivore Kid"	
1997	The Spooktacular New Adventures of Casper	Guest	Episode: "Rats!/Stinkie Time Theater/Great Ghouly Governess"	
1998	Roxanne's Best Christmas Ever	Guest	Animated television special directed by Scott Page-Pagter and S. Patrick Strong	
1999	The Wild Thornberrys	Clan Hyena (voice)	Episode: "No Laughing Matter"	
1998–2000	The Angry Beavers	Trixie (voice)	3 episodes	
2001	The Wild Thornberrys: The Origin of Donnie	Female Rhinoceros Hornbill (voice)	Animated made-for-TV movie directed by Dean Criswell, Carol Millican, Ron Noble, and Joseph Scott	
2001–02	Time Squad	Various voices	2 episodes	
2004	As Told by Ginger	Mrs. Dave (voice)	4 episodes	
2005	The 100 Most Unexpected TV Moments	Self	Television documentary	
2005	Game Show Moments Gone Bananas	Self (Archival footage)	Episode 2	
2006	The Real Match Game Story: Behind the Blanks	Self (Archival footage)	Television documentary	
2007–08	The Emperor's New School	Mata, the Lunch Lady (voice)	5 episodes	
2009	2009 Game Show Awards	Self	Television special directed by Ron de Moraes	
2013	Don't Trust the B— in Apartment 23	Old lady	Episode: "The Leak..."	
