= Radiant (novel) =

2004 novel by James Alan Gardner

- First edition
- Author: James Alan Gardner
- Cover artist: Fred Gambino
- Language: English
- Series: League of Peoples
- Genre: Science fiction
- Publisher: Eos
- Publication date: 2004
- Publication place: Canada
- Media type: Print (Hardcover, Paperback)
- Pages: 416
- ISBN: 978-0-380-81332-2
- OCLC: 61368695
- Preceded by: Trapped

Radiant is a science fiction novel by the Canadian author James Alan Gardner. It was published in 2004 by HarperCollins Publishers under their Eos Books imprint. It is the seventh novel in Gardner's "League of Peoples" series. Like the six preceding novels, Radiant is set in the middle of the 25th century; like most of them, it takes place in outer space and on alien planets, and features the continuing character Festina Ramos.

== Backstory ==
In keeping with the series as a whole, Radiant shares the same backstory and conceptual background as the earlier books. Humanity has moved into the galaxy: based on a terraformed and bio-engineered New Earth, a human society called the Technocracy has developed an advanced, multi-planet, space-travelling society. The Technocracy explores space and colonizes new planets through its navy-like Outward Fleet and its Explorer Corps. Youn Suu, the novel's protagonist and first-person narrator, is a member of that Corps, as are the majority of the protagonists in Gardner's series. The Technocracy exists under the aegis of the League of Peoples, an umbrella organization of highly advanced alien beings that enforces a galactic peace and controls fatal violence against sentient beings in interstellar space.

In Radiant, Gardner develops hints in the earlier books of a more complex picture of the human future. Specifically, he delineates an offshoot of Technocracy society that calls itself Unity. In the Technocracy, genetic modification of human beings is severely limited (though the limits are regularly violated on an individual and black market basis), while the Unity has embraced genetic modification as their way of life. The novel also employs alien species introduced in prior books: the Cashlings (from Ascending), the Greenstriders (from Expendable and Vigilant), the Fuentes (from Ascending), and most notably, from Hunted, the form of sentient red moss nicknamed "the Balrog" (an obvious and Gardner-acknowledged borrowing from J. R. R. Tolkien). In Hunted, a supporting character is infected with the red moss in a symbiotic relationship; in that novel, Festina Ramos describes the moss as "Grossly intelligent...marginally telepathic and telekinetic...possibly precognitive..." (Hunted, chapter 16; ellipses in the original). Experience shows that the moss is far more powerful and formidable than Festina then guessed (scratch the "marginally" and "possibly"). In Radiant, the protagonist Youn Suu is infested with the Balrog, with extreme consequences.

== Buddhism ==
In Radiant, concepts from Buddhism play an important role: Youn Suu is a Buddhist from a planet settled by Buddhists; each chapter is prefaced by a Buddhist term and its definition. Gardner makes interesting connections between the traditional religion and one of the most basic preoccupations of his series, the idea of the evolution of biological life beyond the physical plane of existence. In Gardner's universe, alien species tend to go through an identifiable sequence of development—their "space-exploration phase, their bio-engineering phase, their evolution into immortal energy-beings phase..." (Vigilant, chapter 17; ellipsis in the original). The implication is that humanity can follow the same arc of development—an implication that is stronger in Radiant than in any of its predecessors. The traditional Buddhist concept of individual spiritual development till the attainment of Nirvana dovetails neatly with this fictional idea.

In the Author's Note that prefaces Radiant, Gardner specifies that he is not "preaching" Buddhism, but rather employing the religion to give his character a "multiplicity" of viewpoints on their world and their experience. Through much of the novel, the reader has varied access to the views of three different characters—Youn Suu, Festina Ramos, and a character known only by the nickname Tut, the three Explorers who do the novel's exploring. Ramos is a pragmatic realist, while Tut is a crazy person with a gold-plated face and penis. If Youn Suu embodies an Eastern take on the story's events, Ramos and Tut can be taken to represent the polar opposites of the Western mind. Some would use the terms left-brain (Ramos) and right-brain (Tut), while a classicist might prefer Apollonian versus Dionysian; there are many other pairs of terms that have been proposed for the same basic concepts. All three of these orientations are needed for the story's successful conclusion.

== Plot summary ==
At the start of the story, Youn Suu is a rookie Explorer on her first assignment in interstellar space. Like most Explorers, she suffers from a significant physical deformity—in her case, a facial blemish that has been left untreated to "qualify" her for the Explorer Corps. Her first assignment, with her partner Tut, is to investigate a sudden infestation of the Balrog in a domed city on the home world of the Cashlings. While there, she is herself infested by the red moss. At the same time, Youn Suu and Tut encounter Admiral Festina Ramos, present on a mission of her own.

Aboard an Outward fleet starship, Youn Suu is monitored medically, though there is no cure for her condition and no real treatment. The Balrog, far more than a parasite, is a hive mind well above the human level of development, so that killing it would violate the central precept of the League of Peoples. As its symbiotic relationship with its human host develops, the Balrog comes to share the mental functioning of its host, and prolongs the host's life while consuming her body—"her" because the only prior human host was also female (and also a Buddhist). Youn Suu is also exposed to potential exploitation, by people who want to use the Balrog's special abilities for their own purposes. Meanwhile, Ramos and the other explorers are called to an emergency rescue on a planet called Muta, where Unity survey teams have suddenly disappeared, with barely a peep of a distress signal.

The planet Muta, temperate and Earth-like, is to outward appearances almost ideal for colonization; yet colonizing efforts by the Unity, and the Greenstriders, and perhaps others, have mysteriously failed. The three Explorers land on the planet; even with the most elaborate precautions they fall prey to its peculiar circumstances, and find themselves stranded and contaminated with a microbe that threatens to destroy their bodies.

Investigating their predicament, they learn that the entire planet was once a global research station for the Fuentes, a species that discovered a way to transcend the physical body and transform itself into energy-based or consciousness-based entities. The research done by the Fuentes on Muta 6500 years earlier had been in pursuit of that goal—but had gone horribly wrong, dooming Fuentes and Greenstrider and Unity individuals to a disembodied but tortuous existence. While being hunted by raptor-like reptiles, the three Explorers must find a way to repair alien technology to reverse the damage, before their own bodies collapse.
