= Stephen Stucker =

American actor (1947–1986)

- Stucker in Airplane!
- Born: July 2, 1947; Des Moines, Iowa, U.S.
- Died: April 13, 1986 (aged 38); Hollywood, California, U.S.
- Resting place: Chapel of the Chimes (Oakland, California)
- Occupation: Actor
- Years active: 1975–1986

Stephen Stucker (July 2, 1947 – April 13, 1986) was an American actor, known for portrayals of bizarre characters, notably the manic control-room worker Johnny in the early 1980s Airplane! movies and the stenographer in the courtroom sequence of 1977's The Kentucky Fried Movie.

== Early life and career ==
Stucker was born in Des Moines, Iowa. His family moved to Shaker Heights, Ohio, where he distinguished himself in school as a pianist and class clown.

He made his screen debut co-starring in the 1975 comedic sexploitation film Carnal Madness as Bruce Wilson, a gay fashion designer who escapes from an insane asylum with two fellow inmates, fleeing to an all-girls school. He went on to perform in the 1977 earthquake-in-Los-Angeles comedy Cracking Up, with Fred Willard, Michael McKean and Harry Shearer.

Stucker was a scene-stealing member of the cast of the Madison, Wisconsin, Kentucky Fried Theater sketch comedy troupe founded by David Zucker, Jim Abrahams and Jerry Zucker. In 1977 he appeared in the John Landis film The Kentucky Fried Movie, based on the troupe's sketches. It led to his supporting role in the Zucker-Abrahams-Zucker comedy Airplane!, which he reprised in Airplane II: The Sequel. For the first film, the writers gave Stucker the straight lines for his scenes and let him write his character's off-the-wall responses.

In 1982 he had a guest role in a three-episode sequence in the TV series Mork & Mindy and, in 1983, had a small featured role in Landis's Trading Places. In 1984, he had a co-starring role as the sex-obsessed psychiatrist Dr. Bender in the teen comedy film Bad Manners (aka: Growing Pains).

== Illness and death ==
On July 12, 1984, Stucker was diagnosed with AIDS. He publicly disclosed his illness the following year, becoming one of the first recognizable entertainers to do so. In a November 1985 interview, Stucker claimed he had suffered from cancer-related symptoms as early as 1979, prior to public knowledge of what AIDS was, and that he had previously been an intravenous drug user who had been in social circles with as many as 40 people who had already died of the disease.

He died from AIDS-related complications in a Los Angeles hospital on April 13, 1986, at the age of 38. He is interred in the Chapel of the Chimes.

== Filmography ==
Year	Title	Role	Notes
1975	Carnal Madness	Bruce Wilson	Alternative titles: Delinquent School Girls / Sizzlers
1977	Cracking Up	Bruce "Tushy" Smith	
1977	The Kentucky Fried Movie	Stenographer	(Segment: "Courtroom")
1980	Airplane!	Johnny Henshaw-Jacobs	
1981	Marie	Himself	Episode # 1.7
1982	Mork & Mindy	Billy Vincent	Episode: "Gotta Run: Part 3"
1982	Jimmy the Kid	2nd Neighbor	
1982	Airplane II: The Sequel	Jacobs; Courtroom Clerk	
1983	Trading Places	Stationmaster	
1984	Bad Manners	Dr. Bender	Alternative title: Growing Pains
1985	Hot Resort	Bobby Williams	
1988	The Wizard of Speed and Time	Piano Choreographer	Scenes filmed in 1984; released posthumously
