= The Harrad Experiment =

1973 film by Ted Post

- Theatrical release poster
- Directed by: Ted Post
- Written by: Michael Werner; Ted Cassidy
- Based on: The Harrad Experiment by Robert H. Rimmer
- Produced by: Noel Marshall; Mel Sokolow; Dennis F. Stevens
- Starring: James Whitmore; Tippi Hedren; Don Johnson; Bruno Kirby; Laurie Walters; Victoria Thompson
- Cinematography: Richard H. Kline
- Edited by: Bill Brame
- Music by: Artie Butler
- Distributed by: Cinerama Releasing Corporation
- Release date: May 11, 1973
- Running time: 97 minutes
- Country: United States
- Language: English
- Budget: $400,000
- Box office: $3 million (US/Canada rentals)

The Harrad Experiment is a 1973 coming-of-age film about a fictional school, named Harrad College, where the students learn about sexuality and experiment with each other. Based on the 1966 novel of the same name by Robert Rimmer, this film deals with the concept of free love during the height of the sexual revolution, which took place in the United States during the late 1960s and early 1970s.

The film stars James Whitmore and Tippi Hedren as the married couple who run the school, and includes a young Don Johnson as one of the students who tries to go beyond the rules. It was directed by Ted Post. The screenplay, based upon Rimmer's novel, was co-written by Ted Cassidy and Michael Werner.

A sequel, Harrad Summer, was released in 1974.

== Plot ==
The Harrad Experiment is set in Harrad College, an experimental institution where students are encouraged to explore their sexuality and relationships in an open and honest environment. The story follows a group of students as they navigate the unconventional curriculum and confront their own beliefs, desires and insecurities.

The film begins with the arrival of new students at Harrad College, where they are introduced to the school's unique program by its founder, Professor Philip Tenhausen. The program pairs male and female students as roommates, with the expectation that they will develop a deeper understanding of sexuality, relationships and love.

The main focus is on four students: Stanley, Sheila, Harry and Beth. As they adjust to the program, each student faces personal challenges and growth.

Harry, who is initially uncomfortable with the openness of the experiment, slowly begins to embrace the experience, questioning his previously conservative views on sex and relationships.

Sheila, Stanley's roommate, struggles with her own insecurities and past traumas, but she gradually becomes more confident in expressing her desires and emotions. The two eventually form a close bond, moving from awkwardness to a deeper emotional and physical connection.

Meanwhile, Stanley, who is more open-minded about the experiment, finds himself challenged when he is attracted to and sleeps with Beth, Harry's wilder and less traditional roommate. Both couples’ relationships force them to confront their differing views on love and commitment.

Throughout the film, the students participate in various activities and discussions led by Professor Tenhausen, aimed at breaking down societal taboos and encouraging personal growth. As the experiment progresses, the students' relationships become more complex, leading to moments of tension, jealousy and self-discovery.

The film concludes with the students coming to terms with their experiences at Harrad College. While some leave the experiment with a new perspective on relationships and sexuality, others remain uncertain about the lessons they've learned. The film ends with an open question about the impact of the Harrad Experiment on the students' future lives and relationships.

== Cast ==
- James Whitmore as Philip Tenhausen
- Tippi Hedren as Margaret Tenhausen
- Don Johnson as Stanley Cole
- Bruno Kirby as Harry Schacht (as B. Kirby Jr.)
- Laurie Walters as Sheila Grove
- Victoria Thompson as Beth Hillyer
- Elliott Street as Wilson
- Robert Middleton as Sidney Bower
- Billy Sands as Jack
- Sharon Ullrick (née Taggart) as Barbara
- Maggie Wellman as Cynthia
- Michael Greene as Yoga Instructor
- Ron Kolman as Evan
- Eric Server as Workman
- Robert C. Ross as Workman

Appearing in uncredited roles are Ted Cassidy as a diner patron, Melanie Griffith and Gregory Harrison as students, Melody Patterson as Jeannie, Dennis F. Stevens as a heckler at the Ice House, and George Memmoli, Bill Saluga, and Fred Willard as Ace Trucking Company employees.

== Home media ==
The film was released on DVD on May 22, 2001 by Marengo Films.

== Production ==
Arthur Lubin said he was offered the chance to direct but turned it down as it had too much sex.

== Reception ==
In The Boston Phoenix, Steve Vineberg reviewed the film negatively, writing, "It's more or less tailored to the suburban set who don't feel up to Last Tango in Paris." He added, "The Harrad Experiment can probably be summed up by its opening and closing sequences — it begins with one of the girls wandering around the new campus and hugging a tree, and ends with the two couples whose relationships are the heart of the film clasping hands, repeating some inane contact exercise, and finally falling into a four-way embrace."

Time Out said that while Ted Post had employed long, "voyeuristic" takes and the theme music was poor, the film had more appeal than his other work and deserved its success.

== See also ==
- List of American films of 1973
