= League of Peoples =

Fictional association

The League of Peoples is a fictional interstellar polity present in a series of novels by Canadian science fiction author James Alan Gardner. Although theoretically made up of every sentient race in the galaxy, in actuality the League is controlled by (from Humanity's standpoint) hyperadvanced beings who have little concern for wants, needs, and desires of the less evolved races.

The League effectively has one law - no dangerous non-sentient creatures can cross between star systems. A dangerous non-sentient is defined by the league as any being which kills a sentient being or through negligence allows a sentient being to die. Any dangerous non-sentient that attempts to circumvent this law, or any being who knowingly aids in the attempt, is instantaneously but painlessly executed by the League. Although this renders interstellar war impossible, it does not prevent mayhem on individual planets, nor does it stop unethical behavior that stops short of murder.

== Known Species of the League ==
- Homo sapiens (Technocracy, Old Earth, The Unity)
- Greenstriders
- The Balrog
- Divian
  - Oolom
  - Tye-Tye
  - Freep
- Fuentes / Shaddill
- Cashlings
- Mandasars
- Fasskisters
- Pollisand

== Novels ==
- Expendable (1997)
- Commitment Hour (1998)
- Vigilant (1999)
- Hunted (2000)
- Ascending (2001)
- Trapped (2002)
- Radiant (2004)
