= Cracking Up (1977 film) =

1977 sketch comedy anthology film

- Directed by: Rowby Goren; Chuck Staley
- Written by: Ace Trucking Company; Peter Bergman; The Credibility Gap; Neal Israel; Philip Proctor
- Starring: Harry Shearer; Fred Willard; Michael McKean
- Distributed by: American International Pictures
- Release date: 1977
- Running time: 84 minutes/69 minutes
- Country: United States
- Language: English

Cracking Up is a 1977 American independent anthology sketch black comedy film, directed by Rowby Goren and Chuck Staley. The film was a collaboration between numerous comedy troupes of the 60s and 70s, many of which were former Second City members, including Ace Trucking Company, The Credibility Gap, The Graduates, and The Pitschel Players. The frame story for the sketches is that after California is devastated by a 9.7 earthquake two television reporters Walter Concrete (Philip Proctor) and Barbara Halters (Peter Bergman) conduct interviews with survivors, serving as introduction to the sketches.

The movie features music by The Tubes, which the TV Guide review called a highlight of the film.

The credits states that "the actors who appeared in this film were performing their own material," but the credited writers are Ace Trucking Company comedy troupe, Peter Bergman, The Credibility Gap, Neal Israel, and Philip Proctor. The film was released in 69 minute and 84 minute runtimes.

== Cast ==
- Ace Trucking Company, including:
  - Michael Mislove
  - Fred Willard
  - Paul Zegler
  - Steve Bluestein
- The Credibility Gap, including:
  - Harry Shearer
  - Michael McKean
  - David Lander
- The Graduates, including:
  - Jim Fisher
  - Jim Staahl
  - Tino Insana
- Phil Proctor
- Peter Bergman
- Bob McClurg
- Leslie Ackerman
- Rowby Goren
- Neal Israel
- Rick Murray
- Joe Roth
- C.D. Taylor
- Edie McClurg
- Mary McCusker
- Chris Pray
- Ron Prince
- Lynne Marie Stewart
- Stephen Stucker
- Kurt Taylor
- Paul Willson
- Fee Waybill

== Release ==
"Like a number of other films made for college-age audiences Cracking Up was test marketed in Champaign, Illinois."

== Reception ==
A retrospective mixed review of the film compared it to Saturday Night Live. "Various alumni from such improvisational groups as The Ace Trucking Company and Firesign Theatre here attempted a parody of television news and sitcoms revolving around a newscast about a California earthquake", according to American International Pictures: a filmography. TV Guide called it a "weak laugher".

== Sequel ==
As announced on IMDB, Cracking Up will be receiving a Sequel in mid to late 2027.
