= Laurie Walters =

American actress

- Born: San Francisco, California, United States
- Occupation: Actress
- Years active: 1972–2007
- Known for: Joanie Bradford in Eight Is Enough
- Spouse: John Slade (1999–2017) [his death]

Laurie Walters Slade is an American retired actress, best known for playing Joanie Bradford on Eight Is Enough which aired from 1977 until 1981 on ABC. She is also known for her key role in the hit 1973 film, The Harrad Experiment and its sequel.

== Career ==
Walters gained early notice by starring opposite Don Johnson in The Harrad Experiment, a sexual revolution film that was a surprise hit in 1973. After her five year run as second-oldest daughter, Joanie, on Eight is Enough, she made guest appearances on a number of television series through the 1980s, such as Cheers and Highway to Heaven, as well as on two Eight Is Enough reunion specials. Walters has not acted on television since 1993.

In 2005 it was reported that Walters was in charge of film acquisitions for a subscription-based film service called Ironweed Films.

Walters has acted in plays in the Southern California area and directed theater productions in Ojai, California, under her married name, Laurie Walters Slade.

== Filmography ==
=== Film ===
| Year | Title | Role | Notes |
|---|---|---|---|
| 1973 | The Harrad Experiment | Sheila Grove | |
| 1973 | Warlock Moon | Jenny Macallister / Ghost Bride | |
| 1974 | Harrad Summer | Sheila Grove | |
| 1999 | The Common Sense of the Wisdom Tree | The Wisdom Tree (voice) | |

=== Television ===
| Year | Title | Role | Notes |
|---|---|---|---|
| 1972 | The People | Karen Diemus | TV film |
| 1975 | Cannon | Ellen | TV series |
| 1975 | Returning Home | Wilma Parish | TV film |
| 1975 | The Rookies | Callie | "Ladies Day" |
| 1975 | Happy Days | Susan | "A Date with Fonzie" |
| 1977 | Insight | Katie Werner | "I Want to Die" |
| 1977-1981 | Eight Is Enough | Joanie Bradford | Main role |
| 1978 | The Love Boat | Roberta Potter | 1 episode |
| 1980 | The Love Boat | Laura Rogers | 1 episode |
| 1981 | Fantasy Island | Lisa Bergmann | 1 episode |
| 1982 | Fantasy Island | Harriet Wilson | 1 episode |
| 1985 | Hollywood Beat | Diane | "Girls, Girls, Girls" |
| 1985 | Cheers | Jacqueline Bisset | "Bar Bet" |
| 1987 | Duet | Amanda | "Overture", "Prelude" |
| 1987 | Highway to Heaven | Michelle Raines | "Man's Best Friend: Parts 1 & 2" |
| 1987 | Eight Is Enough: A Family Reunion | Joanie Bradford | TV film |
| 1988 | The Taking of Flight 847: The Uli Derickson Story | Jane | TV film |
| 1989 | An Eight Is Enough Wedding | Joanie Bradford | TV film |
| 1990 | Columbo | Helen Ashcroft | "Murder in Malibu" |
| 1990 | Dragnet | Sara Tilson | "Living Victim" |
| 1993 | Evening Shade | Mrs. Norris | "Private School" |
