= Carnal Madness =

1975 film

- Directed by: Gregory Corarito
- Written by: Gregory Corarito; John Lamb
- Produced by: John Lamb; Maurice Smith
- Starring: Stephen Stucker; Bob Minor; Michael Pataki; Colleen Brennan (as Sharon Kelly); Roberta Pedon
- Cinematography: Louis Horvath
- Edited by: Richard Beck-Meyer
- Music by: Randy Johnson, Fred Selden
- Release date: March 1975 (US)
- Running time: 89 min.
- Country: United States
- Language: English

Carnal Madness (also known as Delinquent School Girls) is a 1975 exploitation film directed by Gregory Corarito and starring Stephen Stucker, Bob Minor, and Michael Pataki as three escaped mental patients wreaking havoc in a female detention center.

== Plot ==
Stucker, Minor and Pataki are cast as a gay fashion designer, a horny soul brother (catchphrase - "This is the best-lookin' piece I've seen in a long time!") and an incompetent impressionist, respectively. The three escape their mental asylum and sexually assault their way into a girls' school. Their broad, knockabout performances attempt to keep the film's content amusing rather than disturbing. The entire female cast consists of softcore porn models (mostly drawn from men's magazines of the era) who don skimpy karate costumes and violently turn the tables on their tormentors.

== Cast ==
- Michael Pataki as Carl C. Clooney
- Bob Minor as Dick Peters
- Stephen Stucker as Bruce Wilson
- Sharon Kelley as Greta Anderson
- Brenda Miller as Penny Archer
- George "Buck" Flower as Earl
- Jane Steele as Betsy Benton
- Ralph Campbell as Mr. Miller
- Zoe Grant as Miss Crowley

== Distribution ==
Corarito's film was shot on 35mm during 1974 and was released to American cinemas in its 89-minute cut in March 1975. A heavily truncated 58-minute print titled Delinquent School Girls appeared on home video (both in America and England, on the TCX label) in the early 1980s, the shorter version of the film deletes most of the opening half hour including all of George ‘Buck’ Flowers scenes. Another pseudonym the film had at this time was Scrubbers 2, obviously designed to cash in on the success of the entirely serious reform school drama Scrubbers (directed by Mai Zetterling) which had recently shocked cinema audiences. However, when Corarito's grindhouse flick was submitted to the BBFC in 1986 in its pre-cut 58-minute form, its title now changed to Delinquents, the board's then-director James Ferman ordered over nine minutes of cuts before granting it an 18 certificate. The film had a British cinema release in 1976 under the title Sizzlers, on the bottom half of a double bill with the British-made Intimate Games (1976). (The BBFC website records show the film was passed with an X rating after cuts, with a running time of 82 minutes.)

== DVD release ==
Carnal Madness was released on DVD in America in Feb 2008, under its Delinquent Schoolgirls title on a double bill with Dream No Evil (1971, John Hayes). The full title of the DVD is Psychotronia Vol. 1 : Delinquent Schoolgirls/Dream No Evil. Extras include a “Commentary by actor Bob Minor with Elijah Drenner".

== See also ==
- List of American films of 1975
