= Capitol Critters =

American animated sitcom (1992–1996)

- Genre: Animated sitcom Comedy-drama; Adult animation
- Created by: Nat Mauldin; Steven Bochco; Michael Wagner
- Directed by: Robert Alvarez
- Starring: Neil Patrick Harris; Charlie Adler; Patti Deutsch; Jennifer Darling; Dorian Harewood; Bobcat Goldthwait; Frank Welker
- Theme music composer: Bruce Broughton
- Composers: Don Davis; Steven Bramson; J.A.C. Redford; Bruce Broughton
- Country of origin: United States
- Original language: English
- No. of seasons: 1
- No. of episodes: 13

Production
- Executive producers: Nat Mauldin; David Kirschner
- Producers: Dayna Kalins; Steven Bochco
- Running time: 22 minutes
- Production companies: Steven Bochco Productions; Hanna-Barbera, Inc. 20th Century Fox Television

Original release
- Network: ABC
- Release: January 28 – March 14, 1992
- Network: Cartoon Network
- Release: September 15, 1995 – September 17, 1996

Capitol Critters is an American adult animated sitcom produced by Steven Bochco Productions and Hanna-Barbera in association with 20th Century Fox Television for ABC. The show is about the lives of mice, rats, and roaches who reside in the basement and walls of the White House in Washington, D.C. Seven out of the show's 13 episodes were aired on ABC from January 28 to March 14, 1992. Cartoon Network later aired all 13 episodes (including the unaired episodes) from 1995 through 1996. ABC Signature and Touchstone Television's successor company 20th Television (under Disney) currently holds the rights to the show.

The series was part of a spate of attempts by major networks to develop prime time animated shows to compete with the success of Fox's The Simpsons, alongside CBS's Fish Police (also produced by Hanna-Barbera) and Family Dog. The latter two, along with Capitol Critters, proved unsuccessful and were quickly cancelled.

== Premise ==
A young mouse named Max is forced to flee his home on a farm in Nebraska after his family is killed by exterminators. He travels to Washington, D.C. to live with his hippie cousin Berkley, rebellious rat Jammet, and Jammet’s mother Trixie. Max also befriends a hip cockroach named Moze and a former laboratory rat named Muggle who still suffers from the side effects of the experiments he is put through that often have him exploding.

The group has to deal with the White House's resident cats, which are caricatures of then-President George H. W. Bush and Vice President Dan Quayle. The episodes' themes reference current issues of the day, including gun control and drug abuse.

== Cast ==
- Neil Patrick Harris as Max
- Charlie Adler as Jammet
- Patti Deutsch as Trixie
- Jennifer Darling as Berkeley
- Dorian Harewood as Moze
- Bobcat Goldthwait as Muggle
- Frank Welker as Presidential Cats

=== Additional voices ===
- Lewis Arquette
- Michael Bell as Roach Husband, Various
- Gregg Berger
- Earl Boen as Lawyer (in "The Bug House")
- Sorrell Booke as Jack Reed (in "Of Thee I Sting")
- Hamilton Camp
- Brian Cummings
- Jim Cummings as Kid Vicious (in "Hat and Mouse"), Various
- Tim Curry as Senator (in "Max Goes to Washington")
- Jeff Doucette as Sibble (in "Into the Woods")
- Nancy Dussault
- Paul Eiding as Max's Father (in "Max Goes to Washington")
- Richard Erdman
- Takayo Fischer as Kazuko (in "A Little Romance")
- Linda Gary
- Joan Gerber as Roach Wife
- Ed Gilbert
- Dan Gilvezan
- Danny Goldman as Opie the Squirrel (in "Opie's Choice")
- Arlene Golonka
- David Graham
- Whitby Hertford
- Gordon Hunt as Nicky (in "The KiloWatts Riots")
- Helen Hunt
- Robert Ito as Ichiro (in "A Little Romance")
- Nick Jameson
- David Jolliffe
- Janice Kawaye as Miko (in "A Little Romance")
- Tony Lamond
- Steve Landesberg as Owl (in "Into the Woods")
- Jarrett Lennon
- Anndi McAfee
- Scott Menville
- Brian Stokes Mitchell
- Rob Paulsen as Janitor, Pigeon (in "The KiloWatts Riots"), Various
- Robert Picardo as Winston (in "The KiloWatts Riots")
- Michael Tucker as Phil (in "Gimme Shelter")
- Noam Pitlik as Sydney (in "Gimme Shelter")
- Don Reed
- Peter Renaday
- Ariana Richards as President's Granddaughter (in "If Lovin' You Is Wrong, I Don't Wanna Be Rat")
- Robert Ridgely as Mikey (in "Of Thee I Sting")
- Neil Ross as Newscaster
- Beverly Sanders as Pigeon (in "Of Thee I Sting")
- Pamela Segall as Violet (in "If Lovin' You Is Wrong, I Don't Wanna Be Rat")
- Jeffrey Tambor
- Mark L. Taylor
- Russi Taylor as Bluebird (in "Into the Woods")
- Marcelo Tubert
- Chick Vennera
- B.J. Ward as Max's Mother (in "Max Goes to Washington")
- Lee Wilkof
- Eugene Williams
- Patty Wirtz
- Bill Woodson
- Patric Zimmerman as Felix (in "The Rat to Bear Arms")

== Episodes ==
| No. | Title | Written by | Original release date | Prod. code | Viewers (millions) |
|---|---|---|---|---|---|
| 1 | "Max Goes to Washington" | Nat Mauldin | January 28, 1992 | ORO1 | 25.1 |
After Max the mouse's family is murdered by pest control workers, he moves to Washington, D.C. to live with his cousin Berkley.
| 2 | "Of Thee I Sting" | Nat Mauldin | January 31, 1992 | ORO3 | 20.6 |
Max gets trapped in the briefcase of a charismatic but crooked politician.
| 3 | "The Rat to Bear Arms" | Nat Mauldin | February 1, 1992 | ORO4 | 11.1 |
Jammet finds a gun and plans on using it to obliterate the presidential cats to avenge the death of a young rat named Felix, who was killed by one of the cats.
| 4 | "Hat & Mouse" | Nat Mauldin | February 8, 1992 | ORO2 | 11.6 |
Moze shows up to return Max's hat, but Max's fellow rodents don't take kindly to a cockroach in their midst.
| 5 | "A Little Romance" | Kathleen Hardin | February 15, 1992 | ORO5 | 10.4 |
When a stowaway family of Japanese mice arrive at the White House, Max rescues their daughter from the presidential cat and falls in love with her.
| 6 | "Opie's Choice" | Nat Mauldin | February 29, 1992 | ORO6 | 10.6 |
Jammet begins supplying Opie the squirrel with caffeine pills.
| 7 | "An Embarrassment of Roaches" | Nat Mauldin | March 14, 1992 | ORO7 | 8.9 |
Max encourages his friends to let an elderly cockroach couple move in next door, but soon the rodents are up to their ears in baby roaches.
| 8 | "Into the Woods" | Nat Mauldin | September 15, 1995 (on Cartoon Network) | ORO8 | N/A |
Trixie mistakes one of Jammet's marbles as a grape and bites into it, causing a massive toothache. Meanwhile, Jammet tries to help an owl who's in danger of losing his home when a crew shows up to tear down the forest and erect a shopping mall.
| 9 | "Gimme Shelter" | Nat Mauldin | September 22, 1995 (on Cartoon Network) | ORO9 | N/A |
Max discovers a rat and a cockroach who've been living in a fallout shelter for 30 years.
| 10 | "The KiloWatts Riots" | Rob Cohen | September 29, 1995 (on Cartoon Network) | ORO12 | N/A |
When the power goes out below the White House, Jammet begins doling out extension cords in return for favors. Meanwhile, Muggle tries to devise an alternative power source.
| 11 | "The Bug House" | Nat Mauldin | September 3, 1996 (on Cartoon Network) | ORO11 | N/A |
Jammet's attempt at cheating during a baseball game lands him, Max and Moze in Roach Prison.
| 12 | "The Lady Doth Protest to Munch" | Nat Mauldin | September 10, 1996 (on Cartoon Network) | ORO10 | N/A |
When an important bill is vetoed, Berkley protests by going on a hunger strike. Of course temptation lies around every corner.
| 13 | "If Lovin' You Is Wrong, I Don't Wanna Be Rat" | Karl Fink & Roberto Benabib | September 17, 1996 (on Cartoon Network) | ORO13 | N/A |
When the president's grandchildren visit the White House, Jammet falls in love with their pet hamster.

== Reception ==
Capitol Critters was cancelled after less than two months. In its short run, the series dealt with such topics as politics, racial segregation, drug addiction, and mortality. In his review of the series, Variety critic Brian Lowry wrote that "at its best, the show seems to ape the work of film director Ralph Bakshi by using an animated setting to explore adult themes", and that "the bland central character and cartoonish elements [...] will likely be off-putting to many adults, who won't find the political satire biting enough to merit their continued attention. Similarly, kids probably won't be as smitten with the cartoon aspects or look". Capitol Critters had their own Burger King Kids Club toys in 1992, which featured Jammet, Max, Muggle, and a Presidential Cat sitting on or emerging from miniature Washington, D.C., monuments.
