= Robert Rimmer =

American writer

- Born: Robert Henry Rimmer; March 14, 1917; Boston, Massachusetts, U.S.
- Died: August 1, 2001 (aged 84); Quincy, Massachusetts, U.S.
- Education: Bates College
- Occupations: Writer, author
- Spouse: Erma Richards (m. 1941)
- Writing career
- Language: English
- Genre: Non-fiction

Robert Henry Rimmer (March 14, 1917 – August 1, 2001) was an American writer who authored several books, most notably The Harrad Experiment, which was made into a film in 1973 followed by a 1974 sequel.

== Early life and education ==
Robert Henry Rimmer was born in Boston, Massachusetts, on March 14, 1917, to Francis "Frank" Henry Rimmer, owner of the Relief Printing Corporation, and Blanche Rosealma, née Rochefort, Rimmer in Boston, Massachusetts. He graduated from Bates College with a multi-disciplinary degree in English, Psychology and Philosophy and later obtained an MBA from Harvard.

== Career ==
Rimmer served in World War II. When his enlistment was up, he returned to the U.S. and took a position in the family printing business. He stated, "Little did I know as a growing fetus in Blanche's womb that twenty-nine years later Relief Printing Corporation would own me, and FH, as I began to call him ("Dad" seemed inappropriate when I was finally in business with him), would be subtly controlling my life." 25 years passed before he wrote his first novel.

He married his wife Erma Richards, a dental technician who had cleaned his teeth, on August 1, 1941.

His relationship with his father, especially, and his mother are reflected in some of his works, such as the novel The Rebellion of Yale Marrat. Rimmer stated, "I transformed portions of my realities into fiction. Pat Marrat, for example, is a fleshier, cigar-smoking version of FH. The conflict between Matt Godwin and his father in The Immoral Reverend has many similarities."

Rimmer has stated that his greatest influences came from reading books, since this was the only real available entertainment in his developmental years, especially reading of his heroes such as Benjamin Franklin and the "Bound to Rise" heroes of Horatio Alger, as well as Hans Christian Andersen, Mark Twain, and the unexpurgated Arabian Nights.

Rimmer died in Quincy, Massachusetts, on August 1, 2001.

== Publications ==
- Rimmer, Robert H. (1962). That Girl from Boston. Challenge Press.
- Rimmer, Robert H. (1964). The Rebellion of Yale Marratt. Challenge Press.
- Rimmer, Robert H. (1966). The Harrad Experiment. Sherbourne Press.
- Rimmer, Robert H. (1967). The Zolotov Affair. Sherbourne Press.
- Rimmer, Robert H. (1968). Proposition 31. New American Library.
- Rimmer, Robert H. (1971). The Harrad Letters to Robert H. Rimmer. Signet. ISBN 0451040376.
- Rimmer, Robert H. (1972). Thursday, My Love. Dutton Adult. ISBN 0453003575.
- Rimmer, Robert H. (1973). Adventures in Loving. Signet. ISBN 0451056051.
- Rimmer, Robert H. (1975). The Premar Experiments. Crown Publishers. ISBN 0517521482.
- Rimmer, Robert H. (1977). Come Live My Life. New American Library.
- Rimmer, Robert H. (1978). Love Me Tomorrow. Signet. ISBN 0451083857.
- Rimmer, Robert H. (1980). The Love Explosion. Signet. ISBN 0451095197.
- Rimmer, Robert H. (1982). The Byrdwhistle Option. Prometheus Books. ISBN 0879751843.
- Rimmer, Robert H. (1986). The X-Rated Videotape Guide (2nd ed.). Harmony. ISBN 0517560585.
- Rimmer, Robert H. (1995). Let's Really Make Love: Sex, the Family, and Education in the Twenty-First Century. Prometheus Books. ISBN 978-0879759643.
- Rimmer, Robert H. (1998). Dreamer of Dreams. iUniverse. ISBN 978-1583481042.

== Film adaptations ==
Rimmer's novel The Harrad Experiment was made into a film in 1973, a sequel called Harrad Summer was released in 1974 and That Girl from Boston was adapted in 1975.
