= Proposition 31 =

- Author: Robert Rimmer
- Language: English
- Publication date: 1968

Proposition 31 is a 1968 novel written by Robert Rimmer that tells the story of two middle-class, suburban California couples who adopt a relationship structure of polyfidelity to deal with their multiple infidelities, as a rationalistic alternative to divorce. The novel is presented as a case study by a psychologist supporting a fictional "Proposition 31" that would amend the California Constitution to recognize non-monogamous relationships. In the book, the solution to the couples' problems with adultery and the impregnation of one couple's wife by the other couple's husband is to commit to a group marriage to raise their five children in a home compound in which the husbands rotate among the wives. The book is a plea to pass this proposed proposition to offer a sane alternative to divorce.
