= The Farmer (film) =

1977 film

- Theatrical release poster
- Directed by: David Berlatsky
- Written by: John Carmody; Janice Eymann; George Fargo; Patrick Regan
- Produced by: Gary Conway; Lang Elliott
- Starring: Gary Conway; Angel Tompkins; Michael Dante; George Memmoli
- Cinematography: Irv Goodnoff
- Edited by: Richard Weber
- Music by: Hugo Montenegro
- Production companies: Fai Cinema; Milway Productions
- Distributed by: Columbia Pictures
- Release date: March 9, 1977
- Running time: 97 minutes
- Country: United States
- Language: English

The Farmer is a 1977 American crime action film directed by David Berlatsky and starring Gary Conway, Angel Tompkins, Michael Dante, and George Memmoli. The film was released by Columbia Pictures on March 9, 1977. The revenge thriller is probably best remembered for its lack of a home media release, as the film never had a release on VHS, Beta, Laserdisc, DVD, or any other release outside of theaters for years until a limited edition Blu-ray was released by Scorpion Releasing in early 2022. The websites Letterboxd and The Grindhouse Database list this movie as belonging to the vetsploitation subgenre.

== Plot ==
Decorated World War II veteran Kyle Martin returns home with a Silver Star to Georgia to start a farm, but realizes running a one-man farm isn't profitable, and the bank needs to foreclose, despite his being a veteran. At that point a gambler named Johnny has an auto crash close to the farm, in which Kyle spares his life. Johnny offers him $1,500, which actually isn't sufficient to spare the homestead.

At this time, Johnny past-posts mobster Passini on a horse race for $50,000. This angers Passini who along with his three colleagues, murders Johnny's bodyguard, and blinds Johnny's eyes with corrosive acid to "make an example out of him".

Johnny asks his mistress Betty to hire Kyle so he can kill Passini and his men individually for $50,000, which he needs to save his farm. Kyle is initially reluctant to do so. However, one of Passini's men by the name of Weasel rapes Betty at Kyle's farm. Weasel then kills the farmhand Gumshoe while trying to save Betty, then burns down the farm.

After arriving in time to save Betty from the burning farm and surveying through the burnt wreckage the next day, Kyle finally accepts Johnny's offer which sets the path for revenge.

== Cast ==
- Gary Conway as Kyle Martin
- Angel Tompkins as Betty
- Michael Dante as Johnny O.
- George Memmoli as Passini
- Lewell Akins as Conductor
- Dave Graig as 2nd Soldier
- Stratton Leopold as Laundry Sam
- Ray McIver as Train Bartender
- Bill Moses as Bank Representative
- Judge Parker as Banjo Player
- Don Payne as Mr. Moore
- Louis C. Pessolano as Bartender
- Johnny Popwell as Conners
- Ken Renard as Gumshoe
- Timothy Scott as Weasel
- Sonny Shroyer as Corrigan
- Wayne Stewart as Sergeant
- Roy Tatum as Soldier
- Jack Waltzer as Doc Valentine
- Eric Weston as Lopie
- Laura Whyte as Waitress

== Production ==
Due to injuries sustained in an accident during the production of this movie, George Memmoli had to decline the part of the disturbed passenger in Taxi Driver that was ultimately played by the film's director, Martin Scorsese. According to Scorsese, the injuries contributed to Memmoli's death in 1985.

== Release ==
=== Theatrical release ===
The film was theatrically released on March 9, 1977, by Columbia Pictures.

=== DVD ===
In 2006, Code Red announced a release of the film on DVD, posting 10 screenshots on their blog, but this never happened.

=== Blu-ray ===
Distributor Scorpion Releasing released the film on Blu-ray Disc in February 2022.

== See also ==
- List of American films of 1977
