= All Those Explosions Were Someone Else's Fault =

2017 novel by James Alan Gardner

First edition

All Those Explosions Were Someone Else's Fault is a 2017 superhero fiction novel by James Alan Gardner. It was first published by Tor Books.

== Synopsis ==
In 1982, the supernatural creatures of the Dark emerged from hiding, and began selling power and immortality to the world's wealthy. In 2001, other humans began developing superpowers — "the Spark" — to restore the balance. Decades later, four college roommates become the latest wielders of the Spark when they are exposed to a laboratory accident, and must save the city of Waterloo from destruction.

== Reception ==
All Those Explosions Were Someone Else's Fault was a finalist for the 2018 Prix Aurora Award for best novel.

Publishers Weekly praised it as "often hilarious" and "enjoyable", and noted its "themes of identity and self-discovery", stating that narrator Kim — who is Chinese Canadian — "both exemplifies and resents Asian stereotypes". Kirkus Reviews lauded it as "terrific" with a "hyperkinetic pace", describing Kim as "vacillat[ing] (delightfully) between snarky and valiant".

Cory Doctorow felt it had "snappy dialog, madcap action and real suspense" and "all the explosions you could ask for". James Nicoll observed that the four roommates are "typical" of university students: "kids devoting themselves to projects ranging from self-reinvention to self-destruction".
