= Hugo Montenegro =

American orchestra leader and film composer (1925–1981)

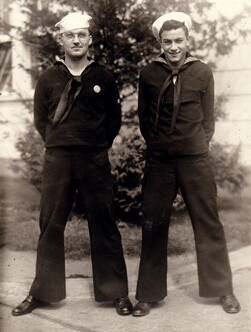
- Newport Navy Band director Frank Rodowicz (left) and Hugo Montenegro at Newport Naval Base, 1944

Background information
- Born: Hugo Mario Montenegro; September 2, 1925; New York City, New York, U.S.
- Died: February 6, 1981 (aged 55) Palm Springs, California, U.S.
- Genres: Film scores
- Occupations: Composer, conductor, arranger

Hugo Mario Montenegro (September 2, 1925 – February 6, 1981) was an American orchestra leader and composer of film soundtracks. His best-known work is interpretations of the music from Spaghetti Westerns, especially his cover version of Ennio Morricone's main theme from the 1966 film The Good, the Bad and the Ugly. He composed the score for the 1969 Western Charro!, which starred Elvis Presley. He also wrote for various television series, most notably the theme to "I Dream of Jeannie"

== Biography ==
Montenegro was born in New York City in 1925. He served in the U.S. Navy for two years, mostly as an arranger for the Newport Naval Base band in Newport, Rhode Island. After the war he attended Manhattan College while studying composition and leading his own band for school dances.

In the middle 1950s, he was directing, conducting, and arranging the orchestra for Eliot Glen and Irving Spice on their Dragon and Caprice labels. It was he who was directing the Glen-Spice Orchestra on Dion DiMucci's first release when Dion was backed by Dragon recording artists, the Timberlanes. Released on Mohawk 105 in 1957, the songs were "Out In Colorado" and "The Chosen Few", which were soon issued on the Jubilee label for better distribution.

He was later hired by Time Records as a musical director producing a series of albums for the label, and moved to Los Angeles in the early 1960s where he began working for RCA Victor, producing a series of albums and soundtracks for motion pictures and television themes, such as two volumes of Music From The Man From U.N.C.L.E., an album of cover versions of spy music themes Come Spy With Me and an album of cover versions of Ennio Morricone's music for Sergio Leone's Dollars Trilogy that led to major chart hits.

Montenegro began scoring motion pictures with the instrumental music from Advance to the Rear in 1964. Following the success of his albums, he was contracted by Columbia Pictures where he scored such films as Hurry Sundown (1967), Lady in Cement (1968), The Undefeated (1969), Viva Max! (1969) and the Matt Helm films The Ambushers (1967) and The Wrecking Crew (1968). He composed the musical score and conducted the recording sessions for the 1969 Elvis Presley Western film Charro! (1969), and he provided some incidental music for the cult 1970 British film Toomorrow. His last film scores were for the exploitation film Too Hot to Handle and the cult action thriller The Farmer, in 1977.

The Farmer (1977) with Montenegro's chilling electronic music score earned an X rating until producer/director David Berlatsky had the review board review the film again without the music score and the rating was changed from X to R, which allowed Columbia Pictures to distribute the film for 17 years. The music rights in order to release a DVD sale could not be obtained as the estate could not be found, the score is considered "lost".

Montenegro was also contracted to Columbia's television production company Screen Gems where he is most famous for his theme from the second season of the television series I Dream of Jeannie, his theme song "Seattle" and music from Here Come the Brides and The Outcasts. He also composed the music for the long-running The Partridge Family, (1970). During the mid‑1960s he started producing some of the most renowned works from the space age pop era, featuring electronics and rock in albums such as Moog Power and Mammy Blue.

Montenegro's electronic works were produced with a retro/futuristic sound with the use of the Moog synthesizer. He will be remembered by his versions of classics such as the main theme to Sergio Leone's film The Good, the Bad, and the Ugly, originally composed by Ennio Morricone. This was Montenegro's biggest pop hit, reaching No. 2 on the Billboard Hot 100 chart, No. 3 in the Canadian RPM Magazine charts, and spending four weeks atop the UK Singles Chart in 1968. It sold over one and a quarter million copies and was awarded a gold disc.

His version of the main theme from Hang 'em High reached No. 59 in Canada. In 1968, his hit "Aces High" placed at No. 11 on the Billboard Year-End Chart of the Top Hits of 1968.

In the late 1970s severe emphysema forced an end to his musical career, and he died of the disease in 1981. He is buried at Welwood Murray Cemetery in Palm Springs, California.

== Discography ==
- Loves Of My Life – Vik Records (RCA Victor) – 1957
- The 20th Century Strings Arranged And Conducted By Hugo Montenegro - Relax With Strings Again – 20th Century Fox Records – 1960
- The 20th Century Strings Volume 1 – 20th Fox – 1960
- Cha Chas For Dancing – Time Records – Series 2000 – 1960
- Bongos and Brass – Time Records – 1960
- Montenegro Plays Dixie – 20th Fox – 1961
- Boogie Woogie + Bongos – Time Records – Series 2000 – 1961
- Great Songs From Motion Pictures Vol. 2 (1938–1944) – Time Records (3) – S/2045 – 1961
- Great Songs From Motion Pictures Vol. 3 (1945–1960) – Time Records (3) – S/2046 – 1961
- Hugo Montenegro In Italy – Oriole – OTS 2040 – 1962
- Spain! – Time Records – 1963
- Overture–American Musical Theatre Vol. 2 – Time-52036/S-2036 – 196?
- Overture–American Musical Theatre Vol. 4 – Time-S/2038 – 1953-1960
- Russian Grandeur LP - RCA Victor - 1964
- Lush and Lovely Movietone - 1965
- Original Music From The Man From U.N.C.L.E. – RCA Victor LSP-3475 – 1965 (No. 52 US)
- Come Spy with Me - RCA Victor LSP-3540 - 1966
- More Music From The Man From U.N.C.L.E. – RCA Victor LSP-3574 – 1966
- Music From Camelot – Mainstream Records S/6101 – 1967
- Hurry Sundown (Original Soundtrack) – RCA Victor – LSO 1133 – 1967
- Montenegro Brand - 20th Century Fox Records 1967
- Music From A Fistful Of Dollars, For A Few Dollars More & The Good, The Bad And The Ugly – RCA Victor LSP-3927 – 1968 (No. 9 US)
- Lady In Cement (Original Motion Picture Soundtrack Album) – 20th Century Fox Records S4204 – 1968
- Magnificent Hugo Montenegro – Pickwick – SPC-3190 – 1968
- Music From The Good, The Bad and The Ugly – RCA Victor-LPM/LSP-3927 - 1967
- Hang 'Em High – RCA Victor-LPM/LSP-4022 – 1968 (No. 166 US)
- Moog Power – RCA LSP-4170 – 1969 (No. 182 US)
- Good Vibrations – RCA Victor-LSP-4104 – 1969
- Colours of Love – RCA Victor–LSP-4273 – 1970
- Hugo Montenegro's Dawn of Dylan – GWP Records–ST-2003 – 1970
- This Is Hugo Montenegro – RCA Victor-VPS-6036 – 1971
- People... One To One – RCA Victor – LSP-4537 – 1971
- Mammy Blue – RCA – LSP-4631 – 1971
- Love Theme From The Godfather – RCA APD1-0001 – 1972
- Neil's Diamonds – RCA APS1-0132 – 1973
- Scenes & Themes – RCA – APD1-0025 – 1973
- Hugo Montenegro Plays A Neil Diamond Songbook – RCA Victor – APD1-0132 – 1973
- Hugo In Wonder-Land – RCA APD1-0413 – 1974
- Others By Brothers – APL1-0784 US – 1975
- Movie scored, The Farmer, starring Gary Conway and Angel Tompkins - Red Earth Records - RE 44039 - 1975
- Rocket Man (A Tribute To Elton John) – RCA Victor APL1-1024 – 1975
- Big Band Boogie – Bainbridge Records – BT 1009 – 1980

== Digital releases ==
- Moog Power – BMG Music (Spain) – 1998
- Mammy Blue – BMG Music (Spain) – 1999
- Love Theme From The Godfather – BMG Music (Spain) – 1999
- Hugo In Wonder-Land – BMG Music (Spain) – 2000
- Neil's Diamonds Fashioned By Hugo Montenegro – BMG Music (Spain) – 2002
- Colours Of Love – Sony BMG Music Entertainment (Philippines) – 2008
- Boogie Woogie Bongos – Smith & Co – 2012
- Cha Chas For Dancing – Time Records – Series 2000 – 2014Source:
