= Warlock Moon =

- DVD cover
- Directed by: Bill Herbert
- Written by: Bill Herbert
- Produced by: William Herbert
- Starring: Laurie Walters; Joe Spano; Edna MacAfee; Harry Bauer; Charles Raino; Ray K. Goman; Steve Solinsky; Richard Vielle
- Cinematography: Larry Secrist
- Edited by: Bill Herbert
- Music by: Charles Blaker
- Distributed by: Enchanted Filmarts
- Release date: September 27, 1973
- Running time: 89 minutes (VHS); 83 minutes (DVD)
- Country: United States
- Language: English

Warlock Moon is a 1973 American horror film written and directed by Bill Herbert and starring Laurie Walters, Joe Spano and Edna MacAfee.

== Premise ==
A young college student believes she had seen ghosts when she first visited an abandoned spa with an unknown companion who had accosted her and "accidentally" driven her there. When she goes there to meet him the second time she ends up the victim of cannibals.

== Cast ==
- Laurie Walters as Jenny Macallister/Ghost Bride
- Joe Spano as John Devers
- Edna MacAfee as Agnes Abercrombi
- Harry Bauer as Hunter
- Steve Solinsky as Axman
- Richard Vielle as Axman

== Release ==
=== Home media ===
The film was released on DVD by Shriek Show on August 17, 2004. Shriek Show later re-released the film as a part of its "Cannibal Lunch Box Triple Feature" on December 4, 2011.

== Reception ==
Joseph A. Ziemba from Bleeding Skull.com wrote, "Shrugging off flaws like dandruff, Warlock Moon is a living urban legend that’s supported by a fine haze of low budget, 1970s goodness. It’s not for everyone and that’s what counts. If you’re in tune with your tastes, this film is a modest miracle drug."

== See also ==
- List of American films of 1973
