= James Alan Gardner =

Canadian science fiction author (born 1955)

- Born: January 10, 1955 (age 71); Simcoe, Ontario
- Occupation: Science fiction writer

James Alan Gardner (born January 10, 1955) is a Canadian science fiction author.

== Early life and education ==
Born in Simcoe, Ontario, he attended the University of Waterloo, where he published his first story, "The Phantom of the Operator", in 1984.

== Career ==
Gardner has published science fiction short stories in a range of periodicals, including The Magazine of Fantasy and Science Fiction, Asimov's Science Fiction, and Amazing Stories.

He has published seven novels in his "League of Peoples" universe, in which humans encounter highly advanced aliens that define murderers as "dangerous non-sentients" and kill them if they try to leave their solar system.

He has also explored themes of gender in novels including Commitment Hour, in which people reaching adulthood must choose their gender, and Vigilant, in which group marriages are traditional.

Gardner is also an educator and technical writer, and published the textbook Learning UNIX in 1991.

== Awards ==
In 1989, Gardner's short story "The Children of Creche" won the Grand Prize in the Writers of the Future contest. Two years later his story "Muffin Explains Teleology to the World at Large" won a Prix Aurora Award. His "Three Hearings on the Existence of Snakes in the Human Bloodstream" also won an Aurora and was nominated for both the Nebula and Hugo Awards. In 2009 his novelette "The Ray-Gun: A Love Story" won the Theodore Sturgeon Memorial Award and the Asimov's Science Fiction Magazine Readers' Award and was nominated for the Nebula Award. In 2022, his "The One with the Interstellar Group Consciousnesses" won Japan's Seiun Award for best translated story of the year (and he had previous Seiun nominations for both "The Ray-Gun: A Love Story" and "Three Hearings on the Existence of Snakes in the Human Bloodstream").

He was inducted into the CSSFA Hall of Fame in 2026.

== Science fiction publications ==
=== Lara Croft, Tomb Raider series ===
- No. 3 Lara Croft and the Man of Bronze

=== League of Peoples universe ===
- Commitment Hour (1998)
- Trapped (2002)
- Festina Ramos series:
1. Expendable (1997)
2. Vigilant (1999)
3. Hunted (2000)
4. Ascending (2001)
5. Radiant (2004)

=== Short story collections ===
- Gravity Wells (2005)
- Organisms (2018)

=== The Dark vs. Spark ===
- All Those Explosions Were Someone Else's Fault (2017)
- They Promised Me the Gun Wasn't Loaded (2018)

=== Anthology ===
- Tesseracts Twenty: Compostela with Spider Robinson (2017)

== See also ==
- List of science fiction authors
- List of University of Waterloo people
- Sex in Science Fiction
