= Vigilant (novel) =

1999 novel by James Alan Gardner

- Author: James Alan Gardner
- Language: English
- Series: League of Peoples
- Genre: Science fiction
- Publisher: Eos
- Publication date: 1999
- Publication place: Canada
- Media type: Print (Hardcover, Paperback)
- Pages: 384
- ISBN: 978-0-380-80208-1
- OCLC: 40818013
- Preceded by: Commitment Hour
- Followed by: Hunted

Vigilant is a science fiction novel written by the Canadian author James Alan Gardner, published in 1999 by HarperCollins Publishers under its various imprints. The book is the third volume in Gardner's "League of Peoples" series, after Commitment Hour (1998).

== Backstory ==
By the mid-25th century, humanity is integrated into a pan-galactic civilization called the League of Peoples, dominated by species of intelligent life evolved far beyond the human level. The benefits of this association are major advanced technologies, including effective interstellar travel, genetic engineering, nanotechnology, and terraforming. The League's cardinal rule is that sentient beings who do not sufficiently respect life are not allowed to travel between solar systems.

== Synopsis ==
Faye Smallwood lives on the colony planet of Demoth, which humans share with the flying squirrel-like Oolom. During her adolescence, the Oolom population was nearly wiped out by a plague before her father discovered a cure for it; at 40, her residual survivor guilt leads her to join the Vigil, a Demoth-wide organization of ombudsmen. As a result, she finds herself enmeshed in an ancient mystery involving murderous androids and biological weapons.

== Reception ==
At the SF Site, Rich Horton praised Gardner's depiction of Faye as "less than perfect but still likable", and called the book "enjoyable" and "fast-moving", but faulted it for its "elaborate edifice of motivations and plots" (while conceding that the "coincidences are generally well explained", and that the book has a "fairly tightly constructed denouement").

At the New York Times, Gerald Jonas described Faye as "engaging", with an "unquenchable spirit and pure heart", but noted that the narrative "stops for nothing, not even common sense", and that it is "wish-fulfillment fantasy of a high order".
