= Elizabeth F. Emens =

American legal scholar (born 1972)

- Born: July 19, 1972 (age 54); Columbus, Ohio, U.S.
- Education: Yale University (BA); King's College, Cambridge (PhD); Yale Law School (JD)
- Known for: Anti-discrimination law, law and sexuality
- Scientific career
- Fields: Law
- Workplaces: University of Chicago Law School; Columbia Law School

Elizabeth F. Emens (born July 19, 1972) is an American legal scholar and an Isidor and Seville Sulzbacher Professor of Law at Columbia University. She specializes in anti-discrimination law, disability law, law and sexuality, family law, and contract law. She is the author of Life Admin: How I Learned to Do Less, Do Better, and Live More (Houghton Mifflin Harcourt, 2019), published in the UK as The Art of Life Admin: How to Do Less, Do It Better, and Live More (Viking, 2019).

Emens graduated summa cum laude from Yale University in 1994 with a B.A. in English and psychology. She completed her postgraduate studies as a Marshall Scholar at King's College, Cambridge, earning a Ph.D. in English in 2002. Also in 2002, Yale Law School awarded Emens her J.D.

After graduating from law school, Emens served as a law clerk for Judge Robert D. Sack on the United States Court of Appeals for the Second Circuit from 2002 to 2003, and then, from 2003 to 2005, as a Bigelow Fellow & Lecturer in Law at the University of Chicago Law School. She has been a professor at Columbia Law School since 2005.

Emens is a member of the New York State Bar Association (admitted 2003) and the American Bar Association (ABA).

== Selected works ==
- (2002). "Queering Law: A Queer Theory of Same-Sex Marriage."
- (2004). "Monogamy's Law: Compulsory Monogamy and Polyamorous Existence." New York University Review of Law & Social Change, 29 (2): 277.
- (2005). "Aggravating Youth: Roper v. Simmons and Age Discrimination." Supreme Court Review, 58.
- (2006). "The Sympathetic Discriminator: Mental Illness and the ADA." Georgetown Law Journal.
- (2007). "Shape Stops Story." Narrative.
- (2007). "Changing Name Changing." University of Chicago Law Review.
- (2008). "Integrating Accommodation." University of Pennsylvania Law Review.
- (2009). "Intimate Discrimination." Harvard Law Review.
- (2012). "Framing Disability." U. Illinois Law Review
- (2014). "Compulsory Sexuality" Stanford Law Review.
- (2015). "Admin." Georgetown Law Journal
- (2019). The Art of Life Admin: How to Do Less, Do It Better, and Live More. (London: Viking).
