= Ace Trucking Company =

American satirical comedy team (1969-1977)

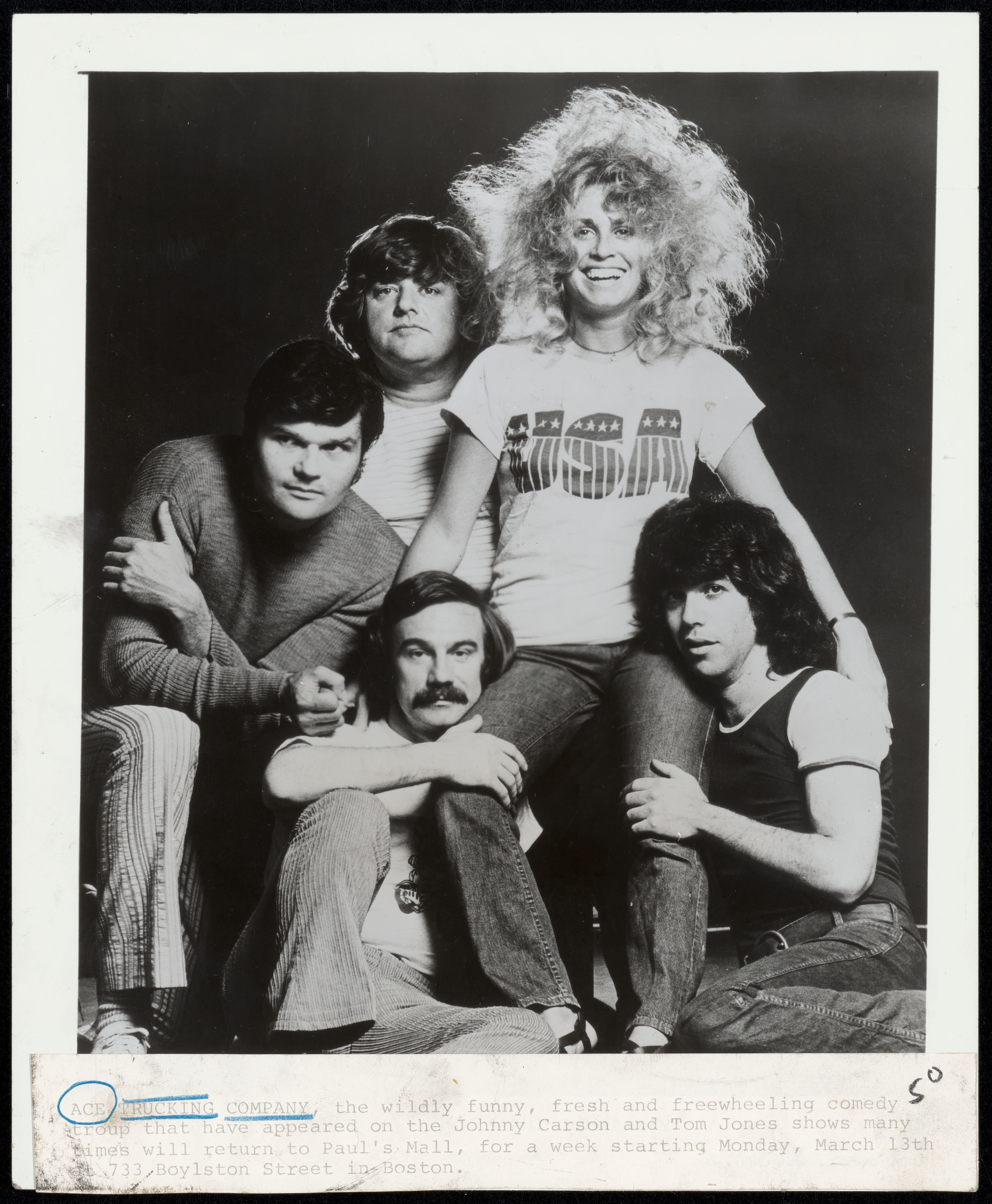
- Ace Trucking Company with (top row, left to right) Fred Willard, George Memmoli, Patti Deutsch, (bottom row, left to right) Bill Saluga, and Michael Mislove, in a promotional photo from March 1972.

Comedy career
- Years active: 1969-1977
- Medium: Television, stage, film, radio, records
- Genre: Satire
- Former members: Michael Mislove, Fred Willard, George Memmoli, Patti Deutsch, Bill Saluga

Ace Trucking Company was an American sketch and improv comedy team formed in New York City in 1969 and active through at least 1977, consisting of Michael Mislove, Fred Willard, George Memmoli, Patti Deutsch, and Bill Saluga. It was one of many splinter groups formed in this period by former The Second City performers, along with such groups as The Committee and The Graduates.

== History ==
The troupe was founded in January 1969 by Michael Mislove, who was performing regularly with Saluga and Memmoli at The Bitter End Cafe on Bleecker Street in Greenwich Village, and Budd & Silver Friedman's Improvisation Cafe (later known as The Improv). Mislove also invited Deutsch, who was appearing at The Upstairs at the Downstairs Cabaret at the Plaza Hotel, and Willard, who was performing in Jules Feiffer's black comedy play Little Murders, directed by and co-starring Alan Arkin, at the Circle in the Square Theatre's Bleecker Street location.

The name Ace Trucking Company was chosen because one of their regular characters, played by George Memmoli, worked for a fictional Ace Trucking Company. Fred Willard recollected that the name Ace Trucking Company was intended to sound very generic, and they were amused by the idea of a very generic name for a comedy group.

Before they even had named the group, Ace Trucking Company was recruited to perform on The Tonight Show Starring Johnny Carson, on which they appeared dozens of times between 1969 and 1975. They performed their first paid engagement as a group on The Tonight Show Starring Johnny Carson on April 24, 1969.

In 1970, Ace Trucking Company released an album of mostly improvised sketches on RCA Victor records. The album consists of 12 tracks, two of which, Paqua Velva and The Electric Chair, were existing set pieces. The other 10 tracks were fully improvised in a single 5-hour session in the recording studio, running from 11:00 p.m. until 4:00 a.m. the next morning. A second album was announced but ultimately was never made.

Ace Trucking Company were series regulars on the popular variety show This Is Tom Jones, performing in two dozen episodes. They also performed on The Ed Sullivan Show, The Mike Douglas Show, The Dick Cavett Show, Burt Sugarman's The Midnight Special, and Kennedy At Night.

In the fall of 1972, Ace Trucking Company were featured on the 13-episode PBS series The Just Generation, hosted by University of California law professor Howard Miller, that aired on more than 200 public television stations nationally. On the series, Miller would introduce a legal topic, which Ace Trucking Company would then perform a comedic skit about, followed by a discussion with high school students, moderated by Miller.

Ace Trucking Company also created a syndicated radio show, The News Cavalcade of the Airwaves, which was a 2.5 minute daily segment spoofing the news. 65 episodes of the 2.5-minute show were created, produced by the Dick Orkin team, and distributed by the Chicago Radio Syndicate.

Ace Trucking Company also appeared in motion pictures including Dynamite Chicken, The Harrad Experiment, Harrad Summer, and Cracking Up.

== Raymond J. Johnson Jr. ==
Group member Bill Saluga (1937-2023) became known for the rest of his life for his comedy routine as character Raymond J. Johnson Jr., which started as an Ace Trucking Company sketch. In a 1982 interview, Saluga recollected that the character "really started when I was with the improv-group The Ace Trucking Company. But the roots of it go back to my days in the navy." The character Raymond J. Johnson, Jr. is referenced in multiple episodes of The Simpsons, with Saluga appearing as himself in the 2002 episode "The Old Man and the Key". The character is also the focus of a subplot in a 2009 episode of King of the Hill, in which Bobby struggles to understand why the routine is funny, and with Saluga contributing voice acting talent to the episode.

== Discography ==
- Ace Trucking Company (RCA Victor, 1970)

=== Track listing ===
Twelve tracks appeared on the album, seven on side 1, and five on side 2. Credited performers and runtimes are given on the album as follows:

- Paqua Velva - Patti, Michael, Bill, Fred (3:35)
- The Electric Chair - Patti, Michael, Bill, George, Fred (7:18)
- Psychiatrist and Patient - Bill, Fred (1:15)
- The Drugstore - Michael, George (1:25)
- 10 to 5 to 5 - Michael, Bill, George, Fred (4:03)
- $3.00 Quarterback - Michael, Bill, George (1:05)
- The Soap Opera - Michael, Bill, George, Fred (6:55)
- Constipation - Michael, Fred (2:48)
- The Honeymoon Night - Patti, Michael, Bill, Fred (3:25)
- The First Buffalo Hunt - Patti, Michael, Bill, George, Fred (5:56)
- Othello - Michael, Bill (4:00)
- The Last Supper - Patti, Michael, Bill, George, Fred (10:00)

== Filmography ==
- Dynamite Chicken (filmed in 1969, released 1971)
- The Harrad Experiment (1973)
- Harrad Summer (1974)
- Tunnel Vision (1976)
- Cracking Up (1977)

== Touring ==
Ace Trucking Company toured and performed widely, typically staying in residence at a venue for a week or two at a time. Below are some of their known tour dates and locations, based on newspaper reports:

- August 16–26, 1971 - The Glass Frogg, Clearwater Beach, Florida.
- June 22–27, 1976 - The Plantation Dinner Theater, St. Louis, Missouri.
- Week of October 13, 1978 - Buffalo Roadhouse, Tampa, Florida
