= George Memmoli =

American actor (1938–1985)

- Memmoli in Phantom of the Paradise (1974)
- Born: August 3, 1938; New York City, U.S.
- Died: May 20, 1985 (aged 46); Los Angeles, California, U.S.
- Occupation: Actor

George Memmoli (August 3, 1938 – May 20, 1985) was an actor and founding member of the improv troupe Ace Trucking Company.

== Career ==
Memmoli was a friend and frequent collaborator of director Martin Scorsese, appearing as a pool hall owner in Mean Streets, and also appearing in New York, New York and American Boy: A Profile of Steven Prince.

In other roles, Memmoli played Philbin in Brian De Palma's Phantom of the Paradise, Jenkins in Paul Schrader's Blue Collar, the engineer Earl in the first season of the McLean Stevenson sitcom Hello, Larry, and a small but memorable role in Rocky as the ice rink worker who allows Rocky and Adrian their first date on the ice.

While on the set of Blue Collar, co-star Richard Pryor hit Memmoli's head with a chair and fractured his skull. As a result, Memmoli filed a $1 million lawsuit against Pryor.

Memmoli's last TV appearance was as Paul "the Wall" Srignoli in the Hill Street Blues episode "The Rise and Fall of Paul the Wall," which aired on December 6, 1984. His final screen appearance was in the 1985 film The Sure Thing, as Uncle Nunzi.

== Death ==
In 1975, Memmoli suffered an injury during a stunt while filming a scene for The Farmer, and had to turn down a role in Taxi Driver during his recovery period.

Memmoli died on May 20, 1985, in Los Angeles, California, at the age of 46. In a 2007 interview, Scorsese attributed Memmoli's death to the injury he received on set.

== Filmography ==
Year	Title	Role	Notes
1971	Dynamite Chicken	Himself - Ace Trucking Company	
1973	The Harrad Experiment	Ace Trucking Company	Uncredited
1973	Mean Streets	Joey	
1974	Harrad Summer	Larry	
1974	Phantom of the Paradise	Philbin	
1975	I Wonder Who's Killing Her Now?	Nurse Dagon	
1975	Hustle	Foot Fetish Man	
1976	Hot Potato	Leonardo Pizzarelli / White Rhino	
1976	St. Ives	Shippo	
1976	Rocky	Ice Rink Attendant	
1977	The Farmer	Frank Passini	
1977	The Domino Principle	Cab Driver	Uncredited
1977	Hot Tomorrows	Man in mortuary	
1977	New York, New York	Nicky	
1977	The World's Greatest Lover	Truck Driver	
1978	Blue Collar	Jenkins	
1979	Americathon	Pinky Fun	
1979	Swap Meet	Luke	
1981	Lunch Wagon	Andy	
1985	The Sure Thing	Man in Bar	(final film role)
