= Commitment Hour =

1998 novel by James Alan Gardner

- First edition
- Author: James Alan Gardner
- Language: English
- Series: League of Peoples
- Genre: Science fiction
- Publisher: Eos
- Publication date: 1998
- Publication place: Canada
- Media type: Print (Hardcover, Paperback)
- Pages: 352
- ISBN: 978-0-380-79827-8
- OCLC: 38733654
- Preceded by: Expendable
- Followed by: Vigilant

Commitment Hour is a science fiction novel by Canadian writer James Alan Gardner, published in 1998. The novel is set in Gardner's "League of Peoples's" futuristic universe, and plays out in the small, isolated village of Tober Cove. Set on post-apocalyptic Earth, Tober Cove most resembles a rural, seventeenth century fishing village, with one exception: every year, everyone below the age of 21 changes gender. At the age of twenty-one, the people of the village must "commit" to being male, female or both in the form of a Hermaphrodite (a 'Neut'), forever. Commitment Hour follows the day leading up to the main character's hour of commitment.

Tober Cove's society revolves around gender. Dualistic in structure, there is a matriarch and a patriarch, both of whom command equal - but different - power within the community. The patriarch is the head of the city council and the military, which also serves as the town's police force. The matriarch runs the town's health services, a vital role in a society without modern medicine. Tasks within the community are largely gender determined: men are warriors, fishermen, carpenters etc. and women are seamstresses, craft-makers, food preparers etc. Thus, in Tober Cove, choosing a gender is akin to choosing a life.

Throughout the book, the main character addresses some of the more obvious questions, and to him more silly questions people from outside the Cove ask. When asked 'which sex is better,' the main character explains that the answer varies from person to person. Of course, if being male was better, or vice versa, the population of Tober Cove would be overwhelmingly one sided. Since it wasn't, you could say that both sexes had equal advantages and disadvantages. Of course, making love to someone from Tober Cove was always better, since they knew what felt good for both sexes.

Tober Cove's religion also revolves around gender. The residents believe that the gods granted the people of their town the special privilege of choosing their sex, and that every year the gods come to collect their children and change their genders. The fact that the "gods" that descended into the town's harbor every year are stylized planes doesn't bother the residents. They simply believed that the gods used many devices as their instruments.

Tober Cove exists in a post-apocalyptic Earth. Earth is post apocalyptic in the sense that, when the "League of Peoples" offered humanity technological advance in exchange for the promise never to kill other sentient creatures, most of the population of Earth accepted and left the planet. Those who remained were those who wouldn't, or couldn't accept the League's offer. As Earth's population departed, the planet descended into chaos. The book takes place about 400 years after this great exodus, and while some technology still exists, most has fallen in ruin. Tober Cove is a small, rural, technologically undeveloped town that is unique in the galaxy.

Spark Lords rule Earth with super-advanced technology. Clad in indestructible armor, with access to the galaxy's latest gadgetry, Spark Lords maintain absolute control over Earth. Charged by the League with maintaining law and order on Earth, they content themselves with preventing major conflicts. They generally stay out of local affairs, and, to the knowledge of Cove residents, no Spark Lord has ever visited Tober Cove. Much of the plot of the novel is driven by the arrival in Tober Cove of the Science Spark Lord to observe the gender-changing ceremony.

== Reception ==
At Tor.com, Jo Walton declared that the best thing about the novel was Fullin's voice, which she described as "confident confiding first person"; she also stated that the most interesting thing was Fullin's belief "that he's living in a low tech fantasy world, full of gods and magic and rituals and taboos, when in fact it's quite clear to the reader as the story goes on that this is a post-technological, indeed, post-singularity society", and emphasized that the culture of Tober Cove is "very sophisticated" and "very Canadian". The SF Site's Donna McMahon considered it to be "engaging, entertaining, funny and very well written", faulting it only in that she found it unlikely that, "in a society with very rigid traditional gender roles, the sex ratio would end up around 50-50 even if each person was given a completely free choice" — and in that she felt Gardner "has never lived in a fishing village" and therefore "didn't capture the feel of a fish-guts-stinking rural subsistence economy".

Conversely, at Quill and Quire, Crawford Kilian compared it negatively to Ursula K. Le Guin's The Left Hand of Darkness, judging Fullin to be "a stock character who speaks in a flat colloquial style that evokes 1990s suburban America", and the society of Tober Cove to be "crude and implausible"; Publishers Weekly likewise felt that Gardner "lacks the finesse of Le Guin's anthropological SF", calling it "silly" and "less than stellar".

== See also ==
- Sex and sexuality in speculative fiction
