= Harrad Summer =

- Theatrical release poster
- Directed by: Steven Hilliard Stern
- Written by: Mort Thaw; Steve Zacharias
- Produced by: Dennis F. Stevens
- Starring: Richard Doran; Victoria Thompson; Laurie Walters; Robert Reiser; Bill Dana
- Cinematography: Richard H. Kline
- Edited by: Bill Brame
- Music by: Patrick Williams
- Production companies: Cinema Arts Productions, Inc.
- Distributed by: Cinerama Releasing Corporation
- Release date: August 1974
- Running time: 103 minutes
- Country: United States
- Language: English

Harrad Summer is a 1974 film sequel to the 1973 film The Harrad Experiment, directed by Steven Hilliard Stern.

The film follows Harrad College students Stanley, Sheila, Harry, and Beth as they spend summer vacation together to get to know their families. Don Johnson and Bruno Kirby did not reprise their roles from the first film, while James Whitmore's character did not appear and Tippi Hedren's role from the original film was played by Emmaline Henry.

== Plot ==
Harrad Summer is a 1974 sequel to The Harrad Experiment, continuing the story of the students from Harrad College as they navigate their unconventional relationships during a summer vacation.

The film picks up with the four main characters—Stanley, Sheila, Harry, and Beth—deciding to spend the summer together, traveling and exploring the outside world beyond the experimental environment of Harrad College. The group embarks on a road trip, hoping to put into practice the lessons they learned about love, sexuality, and relationships.

As they travel, they encounter various situations that test their beliefs and challenge their commitment to the ideals of the Harrad experiment. Harry and Beth's relationship is put under strain as they confront the realities of jealousy and possessiveness, which were not as evident in the controlled environment of the college. Their bond is tested as they struggle to maintain the open and honest communication they had developed.

Stanley and Sheila face their own set of challenges. Stanley's free-spirited nature begins to clash with Sheila's more traditional views, leading to tensions in their relationship. They meet other people along the way, each encounter forcing them to reassess their feelings for each other and the future of their relationship.

The group also encounters external pressures from society, as their unconventional lifestyle is met with judgment and disapproval from others. This forces them to reflect on the viability of the Harrad experiment outside the college's supportive environment.

As the summer progresses, the characters experience moments of personal growth and revelation, but also face the harsh realities of their differing expectations and desires. The film explores the complexities of maintaining open relationships and the emotional challenges that come with them.

The film concludes with the group returning to Harrad College, each member having been changed by their experiences over the summer. Some relationships are strengthened, while others are left unresolved, reflecting the ongoing process of self-discovery and the uncertain future of their experiment in love and relationships

== Cast ==
- Robert Reiser as Stanley Kolasukas
- Laurie Walters as Sheila Grove
- Richard Doran as Harry Schacht
- Victoria Thompson as Beth Hillyer
- Emmaline Henry as Margaret Tonhausen
- Bill Dana as Jack Schacht
- Marty Allen as Bert Franklin
- Walter Brooke as Sam Grove
