= Expendable =

1997 novel by James Alan Gardner

- Author: James Alan Gardner
- Cover artist: Luis Royo
- Language: English
- Series: League of Peoples / Festina Ramos
- Genre: Science fiction
- Publisher: Eos Books
- Publication date: 1997
- Publication place: Canada
- Media type: Print (Hardcover, Paperback)
- Pages: 352
- ISBN: 978-0-380-79439-3
- OCLC: 37108212
- Followed by: Commitment Hour

Expendable is a science fiction novel by the Canadian author James Alan Gardner, published in 1997 by HarperCollins Publishers under its various imprints. It is the first book in a series involving the "League of Peoples", an assemblage of advanced species in the Milky Way galaxy. There is a "sub-series" involving just the character Festina Ramos, and sometimes the female Oar.

The novel introduces many concepts in Gardner's "League of Peoples" universe, such as the Explorer Corps, Sentient Citizens, and the League itself.

== Backstory ==
Through the course of the novel, Gardner provides a framework, background, and conceptual structure for his future narrative. In this backstory, humanity attains a technology of "spacetime distortion" to create an effective "star drive", thus leaving the Solar System to explore and colonize planets orbiting other stars. Through this exploration and colonization effort, humans come into contact with many different species of intelligent life, sometimes vastly different in nature, sometimes of a much higher state of technological and evolutionary development. The more advanced beings have forms that stretch the humans' definition of life: they can appear as "a cloud of red smoke, a glowing cube", or as nothing at all.

These species have an organization for the galaxy, to control interstellar travel and contact; it is called the "League of Peoples". The League's primary rule is simple: no killing of other sentient beings. No war, no fatal violence; the League even prohibits lethal weapons in interstellar space. This is the guideline that determines sentience in the League's definition. Species that fail to obey this rule are restricted to their native solar systems, within which they can live as they please. If "dangerous non-sentients" attempt star travel, they are punished with instant death. The actual implementation of this rule in practice, in specific and varying cases, is more complex and ambiguous than vague generalities can capture.

For species that do obey the league's primary commandment, however, the rewards can be great: advanced technologies are dealt out to co-operative societies. Much of mankind (though not all; a remnant still exists on "Old Earth") have accepted this bargain: from a genetically-engineered New Earth, a unified human culture calling itself the Technocracy sends out a fleet of ships to explore and colonize new planets. The fleet is run under a quasi-military and naval structure, under the command of a High Council of admirals; the spaceships' crews function much as traditional navies did on Old Earth, except for engaging in combat.

Exploring new planets, however, is dangerous work; in a society with no war, little crime or violence, and excellent advanced health care, the deaths of fit and intelligent young people, occasionally in the most extreme and elaborate ways, are a source of significant psychological trauma and social stress. The Technocracy has dealt with this problem by organizing a special Explorer Corps. These are individuals fit enough and smart enough to do the job, but afflicted with physical disadvantages (handicaps, diseases, or sometimes simple ugliness) that place them outside the norm of society. Candidates are identified in childhood, and conscripted into the Explorers; even if their deficiencies are easily correctible, they are left untreated. When these Explorers die in the course of their work—as they often do—the citizens of the Technocracy manage to cope with the shock.

== Plot summary ==
The year is 2452. Festina Ramos is an Explorer, assigned to the Technocracy Fleet ship Jacaranda. Her specific physical "qualification" for her job is a large port-wine birthmark on her right cheek. She and her fellow Explorer and partner Yarrun Derigha (who is missing half his jaw) are the two Explorers assigned to the ship; they lead the isolated existence typical of Explorers, isolated from the healthy and attractive members of the fleet as from the "beautiful people" of the larger society.

Then Festina and Yarrun are plunged into a crisis: they are assigned to escort a Fleet admiral named Chee to planet Melaquin. Melaquin is the great question mark in the Technocracy's domain: for forty years Explorers have landed there, only to lose contact and disappear, cause unknown. The High Council has now acquired the habit of sending its troublesome admirals to Melaquin in the company of a team of Explorers, to rid itself of embarrassments without scandal or controversy. The fact that Explorers are lost in the process is accepted—since Explorers are expendable.

Admiral Chee is precisely the kind of embarrassment the high council wants to dispose of, quickly and quietly. Well beyond the century mark in age, when doses of Youthboost are no longer effective in prolonging his life and health, he is "clearly unstable, possibly senile"—or else "suffering from Don't-give-a-shit-itis". Though they try to avoid the duty, and then concoct a plan of escape from their apparent sentence to oblivion, Festina and Yarrun must accompany Chee to the surface of Melaqiuin. There, things go quickly and badly wrong: Festina accidentally kills Yarrun while attempting an emergency tracheotomy, Chee dies of a stroke, and Festina is cut off from her ship, alone on Melaquin.

The planet reveals itself to be amazingly Earth-like—so much so that it is clearly not natural, but a result of terraforming and genetic modification. Festina quickly meets one of the inhabitants of the planet—"A nude woman made of glass...like an Art Deco figurine." Their meeting does not go as the Explorer corps intends for first-contact situations. Eventually, though, the two establish contact; the glass woman introduces herself: "My name is Oar. An oar is an implement used to propel boats." She has learned English from the previous Explorers who came to the planet. A product of sophisticated genetic engineering, she is human, but flawlessly beautiful and possessing enhanced strength and intelligence; yet she has the emotional maturity of a spoiled child. Through Oar, Festina gains contact with the dying subsurface civilization that lingers on Melaquin, begins to unravel the mysteries of the planet, and pursues the trail of the Explorers who came before her.

Now "friends", Festina and Oar set off in search of the other Explorers and the truth behind Admiral Chee and the high council's involvement with Melaquin. The two find the Explorers building a spaceship; if the Explorers can get to interstellar space and send a distress call, the rules of the League may mandate that they be rescued and returned to society—if the Fleet does not stop them first. In due course Festina meets an old flame (a cross between a schoolgirl crush and the love of her life), who reveals himself to be a profound danger instead of a welcome ally. Oar sacrifices herself for her friend, and Festina manages to return to the Fleet and the Technocracy in a way she could never have anticipated.

== Reception ==
Publishers Weekly called it "impressive", with "an intriguing premise", and lauded the "fully realized characters and situations, convincing science and entertaining style".

James Nicoll found Festina to be "an engaging protagonist", and noted that "large portions of [the text] are very funny". John Clute was considerably harsher, labeling the rationale for the Explorer Corps as "perhaps the dumbest sociobiological explanation of any human activity [italics in original] I have ever encountered in a novel", and stating that although it is "not a very good book", Gardner's prose was too skillful to bore the reader into giving up before reaching the end.

Expendable was ranked second in the 1998 Locus Award for Best First Novel.
