= Bill Saluga =

American comedian (1937–2023)

- Born: William Saluga; September 16, 1937; Youngstown, Ohio, U.S.
- Died: March 28, 2023 (aged 85); Los Angeles, California, U.S.
- Notable work: Founding member of Ace Trucking Company comedy troupe; Created the stage character Ray J. Johnson, Jr.

Comedy career
- Medium: Stand-up, film, television
- Genres: Sketch comedy, improvisational comedy, character comedy
- Subjects: Self-deprecation, everyday life

William Saluga (September 16, 1937 – March 28, 2023) was an American comedian and founding member of the improvisational comedy troupe Ace Trucking Company. He appeared on several television programs, including Seinfeld.

== Early life ==
Saluga was born on September 16, 1937, in Youngstown, Ohio. When Saluga was 10, his father was killed in an industrial accident at the Republic Steel Mill where he worked and his mother supported the family by working as a bookkeeper. Saluga, known as "Billy" to his friends and family, was a high school cheerleader and class clown. After graduation, he served two years in the Navy and then began working as a performer in local theaters.

== Career ==
Saluga spent several years performing in Youngstown, Ohio theaters and clubs. He played numerous roles in notable productions, including Guys and Dolls and Inherit the Wind. He became a talent coordinator for the Steve Allen show in the late 1960s. in 1969, he created the "Johnson" character while a member of the comedic troupe Ace Trucking Company.

Saluga's shtick as the character "Johnson" would be, when someone would refer to him as "Mr. Johnson" or by the common generic nickname "Johnson," to exaggeratedly feign offense and list off all permutations of the name Raymond J. Johnson Jr. and nicknames thereof that do not mention the word "Johnson:"

"NOOO!!! You don't have to call me Johnson! My name is Raymond J. Johnson Jr. Now you can call me Ray, or you can call me J, or you can call me Johnny, or you can call me Sonny, or you can call me Junie, or you can call me Ray J, or you can call me RJ, or you can call me RJJ, or you can call me RJJ Jr. . . but you doesn't hasta call me Johnson!"

Saluga would then smugly turn away and begin puffing on his cigar. Saluga's routine received more widespread attention in the late 1970s after being used in a series of commercials for Miller Lite beer, and subsequently, in the early 1980s for Anheuser-Busch Natural Light beer. Saluga appeared alongside comedian/pitchman Norm Crosby echoing (in a roundabout way) Norm's advice to unknowing customers on how to more easily order the lengthily-named beer: "Well, y'doesn't hasta call it Anheuser Busch Natural Light Beer, and y'doesn't hasta call it 'Busch Natural.' Just say 'Natural!'" Saluga then later launches into the "You can call me Ray" routine after Crosby warns not to ask Johnson his name.

From 1977 to 1978, Saluga appeared regularly as Raymond J. Johnson Jr. on Redd Foxx's eponymous variety show. Saluga as Johnson also made appearances on This Is Tom Jones, Laugh-In and The David Steinberg Show. He also made appearances on Chuck Barris' The Gong Show during 1977 and 1978.

A novelty disco single called "Dancin' Johnson," based around Johnson's schtick, was released in 1978.

First appearing in 1977, a character called Zalman T. Tombstone, Jr. has popped up many times over the years on the Svengoolie television show. He is a floating human skull with a thick mustache and a voice provided by Svengoolie portrayer Rich Koz. A 1978 episode of Good Times contained a scene where Keith (while intoxicated) recited "You can call me Ray, or you can call me J" which was at the height of its popularity for the saying. Bob Dylan referenced the "you may call me" schtick in his 1979 hit, "Gotta Serve Somebody," when he sings, "You may call me Terry, you may call me Timmy / You may call me Bobby, you may call me Zimmy / You may call me R.J., you may call me Ray / You may call me anything, but no matter what you say / You’re gonna have to serve somebody." The idea for the verse originated from Jerry Wexler, who suggested it during the recording sessions for Slow Train Coming.

The character's popularity is referenced in multiple episodes of The Simpsons, with Saluga appearing as himself in the 2002 episode "The Old Man and the Key". Saluga also appeared as Johnson in the 2010 King of the Hill episode "Just Another Manic Kahn-Day".

In 2005, he featured in three episodes of Season 5 of Curb Your Enthusiasm, playing Louis Lewis, the fictional cousin of Richard Lewis; Saluga's character is in a coma for the first two episodes, only to recover in the final episode, much to the consternation of star Larry David, who was hoping that Louis would die and provide the kidney Richard Lewis needs, so that Larry could avoid having to donate one of his own.

== Death and legacy ==
Saluga died of cardiopulmonary arrest in Los Angeles on March 28, 2023, aged 85. Saluga's nephew, Scott Saluga, told the media that his uncle was living in Burbank, California, at the time of his death. Bill Saluga left no surviving immediate family members. He had often told friends he didn't mind being typecast and known to the public as Raymond Johnson.

Comedian David Steinberg said that "Billy was always doing Ray J. He was relentless with it. I would say 'Mr. Johnson' and Billy would be off. He did it everywhere. At parties. His timing and delivery were so funny every time." In 2017, Saluga said that people never recognized him outside his character and that it gave him great pleasure hearing people perform his shtick in his presence without knowing who he was.

== Bibliography ==
- Saluga, Bill (1982). Bill Saluga's Name Game Book. Bantam Books. ISBN 978-0553207545.
