= Victor Nord =

Israeli-American independent filmmaker (born 1945)

- Віктор Бенедиктович Норд-Левін
- Born: Victor Levin; 1945 (age 80–81); Odesa, Ukrainian SSR
- Occupation: Filmmaker

Victor Benediktovich Nord-Levin (Note: Hebrew: ויקטור׳ נורד־לוין, romanized: Victor Nord-Levin; Ukrainian: Віктор Бенедиктович Норд-Левін, romanized: Viktor Benedyktovych Nord-Levin; Russian: Виктор Бенедиктович Норд (Левин), romanized: Viktor Benediktovich Nord (Levin)) (birth name: Victor Levin, born 1945 in Odesa, Ukrainian SSR, Soviet Union) is an Israeli-American independent filmmaker best known for his 1977 Israeli directorial debut The Garden that represented Israel at the 1977 Cannes Film Festival, the 1977 San Francisco International Film Festival, and the 1978 Toronto Waterfront International Film Festival.

== Biography ==
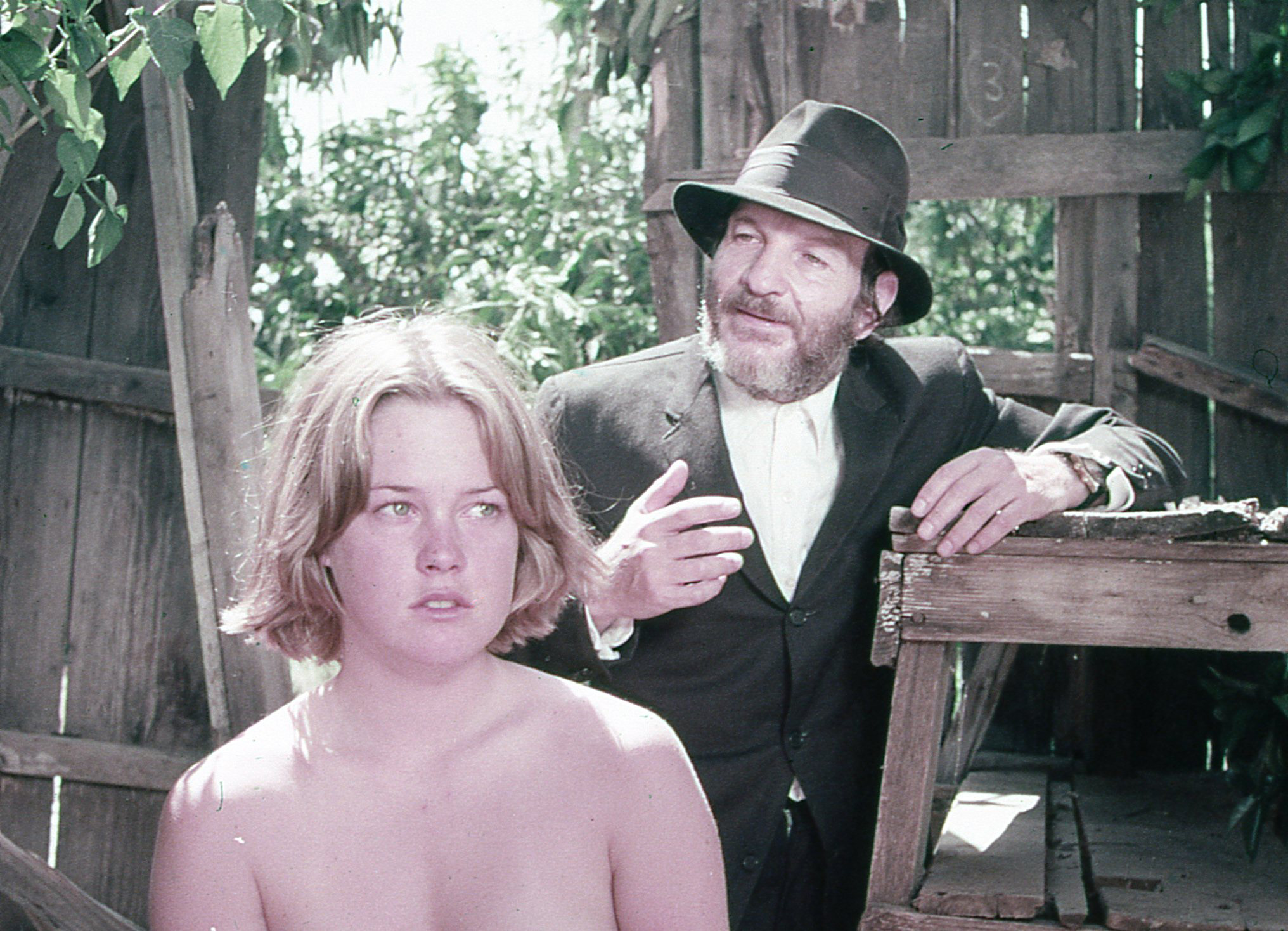
Melanie Griffith and Shaike Ophir in The Garden (Photographer: Yoni Hamenachem)

Nord, son of actress Evgeniya Mikhailovna Rostova-Nord née Goldenberg and Soviet theatre director and actor Benedict Nord, immigrated to Israel from the Soviet Union in April 1973 after graduating with honors in 1971 from the All-Union State Institute of Cinematography, now Gerasimov Institute of Cinematography. He started working as assistant on film stages in Moscow while only sixteen and decided to immigrate to Israel after encountering difficulties related to political censorship and antisemitism with directing his first own films in the Soviet Union. Nonetheless, he managed to work briefly as assistant director on Sergei Bondarchuk’s, 1970 film Waterloo, and for one year on Aleksei Yuryevich German’s 1971 film Trial on the Road. Since 1982 he resides in New York, New York. More recently he worked as editor on "The Russians Are Here" Frontline. In 1984 (the show Captive in El Salvador he edited was awarded an Emmy Award); as director of dialogue he worked on The Comrades, 12-episode series (WGBH-TV-Boston). Nord is also the author of nine screenplays (2004–2018) written especially for television series.

== Personal ==
He is married to Elena S. Nord-Levin née Shevelyov and is father to Benny Nord-Levin (born 2001) and David Nord-Levin (born 2007).
