= Martin R. Dinnes =

- Citizenship: United States
- Education: University of California, Davis
- Scientific career
- Fields: Veterinary medicine

Dr. Martin R. Dinnes was a veterinarian from Agua Dulce, California, recognized for his accomplishments in veterinary medicine. He died on December 12, 2017.

Dinnes graduated from UC Davis School of Veterinary Medicine in 1966. His work created new medical protocols for the health and well-being of animals. He invented and developed the Telinject system for remotely injecting reptiles, mammals and birds. He also formulated, tested and commercially produced balanced diets for non-domestic species.

== Career ==
In 1972, Dinnes founded Dinnes Memorial Veterinary Hospital of Santa Clarita, California, and was the first veterinarian to completely devote veterinary practice to non-domesticated animals, limiting his practice to zoo and aquatic animal medicine and surgery.

Dinnes was a consulting veterinarian for the 1983 adventure film The Golden Seal.

In 1984, he was one of eight veterinarians chosen by the American Veterinary Medical Association to form the American College of Zoological Medicine.

Dinnes founded the International Zoo Veterinary Group (IZVG), providing consulting in disease prevention, quarantine procedures and tranquilizing procedures for the international shipment of animals. The IZVG promotes the international exchange of pharmaceutical and biological guidelines that may or may not be allowed for use in a particular country.

He was a veterinarian for Shambala Preserve in Acton, California, and a director of product research and development of zoological formulas for Natural Balance Pet Foods.

== Accolades ==
In 2000, Dinnes was presented with a Previous Alumni Achievement Award at University of California, Davis. He was awarded the American Association of Zoo Veterinarian's Lifetime Achievement award the first year the award was given, in 2014.
