= Yellowstone Wildlife Sanctuary =

American animal sanctuary

- Formation: 1983; 43 years ago
- Type: Nonprofit
- Tax ID no.: 81-0422009
- Legal status: 501(c)(3)
- Purpose: Providing lifelong sanctuary to non-releasable Greater Yellowstone Ecosystem wildlife while sharing a message of education and conservation.
- Headquarters: Red Lodge, Montana, U.S.
- Coordinates: 45°11′53″N 109°14′31″W
- Region served: North America
- Affiliations: Accredited by the American Sanctuary Association
- Employees: 10 (2021)
- Website: https://yellowstonewildlifesanctuary.org/
- Formerly called: Beartooth Nature Center

The Yellowstone Wildlife Sanctuary is the 501(c)(3) nonprofit animal sanctuary in Red Lodge, Montana, with the mission of providing lifelong sanctuary to non-releasable Greater Yellowstone Ecosystem wildlife while sharing a message of education and conservation. The Yellowstone Wildlife Sanctuary is accredited by the American Sanctuary Association.

== History ==
Yellowstone Wildlife Sanctuary was formed in 1983 as the Red Lodge Zoological Society, but changed its name to the Beartooth Nature Center around the time the facility opened on about 7.5 acres (3.0 ha) adjacent to Red Lodge's Coal Miner Park a few years later. In 2012, the name was changed to Yellowstone Wildlife Sanctuary to better describe what the organization does.

Despite the word "Yellowstone" in the title, the organization is not connected to or funded by Yellowstone National Park. The sanctuary's funding comes from grants, donations, admissions, education programs, and gift shop sales.

== Animals ==
The Yellowstone Wildlife Sanctuary takes in the only non-releasable wildlife of species native to the Greater Yellowstone Ecosystem. The animals may be non-releasable due to being injured, habituated to humans, or orphaned. According to their website, mammal species represented as of 2021 include black bear, gray wolf, coyote, red fox, mountain lion, Canada lynx, bobcat, bison, and raccoon. Bird species represented include sandhill crane, turkey vulture, American crow, raven, great horned owl, screech owl, red-tailed hawk, ferruginous hawk, Swainson's hawk, and prairie falcon. Reptiles and amphibians include western hognose snake and tiger salamander.

The sanctuary has an on-site animal care staff, plus arrangements with three local veterinarians. Like all other organizations of its kind, it is licensed by the USDA and regularly inspected by APHIS for compliance with the Animal Welfare Act. It also carries a license from the Montana Department of Fish, Wildlife and Parks and a migratory bird permit from the United States Fish and Wildlife Service to keep birds in accordance with the Migratory Bird Act.

== See also ==
- American Sanctuary Association
