= Noel Marshall =

American producer, director, agent, and actor

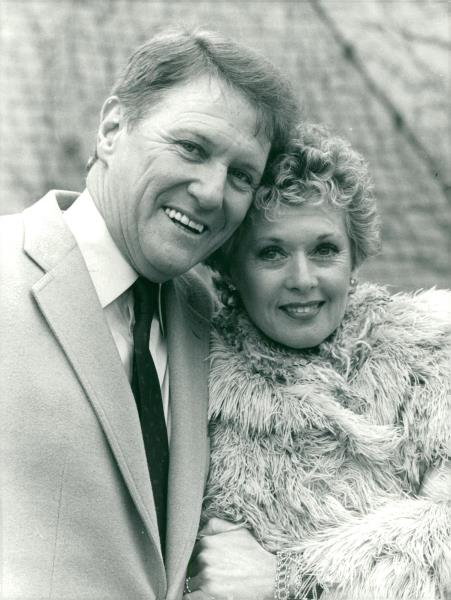
- Marshall and wife Tippi Hedren in 1982
- Born: Noel Bangert; April 18, 1931; Chicago, Illinois, U.S.
- Died: June 30, 2010 (aged 79); Santa Monica, California
- Occupations: Talent agent, producer, director, actor
- Known for: Roar
- Spouses: Jaye Joseph Marshall (divorced) Tippi Hedren (m. 1964; div. 1982) Paula Marshall Doss (m. 1985; div. 1992)
- Children: 3

Noel Bangert (April 18, 1931 – June 30, 2010), mainly known as Noel Marshall, was an American agent, co-producer, and briefly a director and actor for the 1981 film Roar. He moved to Hollywood, California, in his 20s and began investing in the production of a handful of films, including William Peter Blatty's The Exorcist.

In the 1970s, Marshall and his family, including his then-wife, Tippi Hedren, and her daughter, Melanie Griffith, began production on Roar, which is notorious for its 11-year accident-ridden production due to the many production mishaps and damages caused on-set. The cast and crew worked with real big cats, leading to 70 people being injured during the making of the film. It later received the tagline "The most dangerous movie ever made".

== Early life and career ==
Originally known as Noel Bangert in Chicago, Marshall spent his early childhood in South Chicago with his eleven younger siblings. He had developed an interest in animals when he was working a summer job at the St. Louis Zoo. He moved to Hollywood in his 20s to work in television.

Marshall also produced fiberglass automobile bodies during the 1950s under his company Bangert Enterprises. As an agent in Hollywood, one of his clients was William Peter Blatty, who wrote the novel The Exorcist. Blatty made a deal with producer Paul Monash to team up for the film adaptation, but they had arguments over plot changes, so Monash left and Marshall was made executive producer. He was also executive producer for Mr. Kingstreet's War, and The Harrad Experiment (both 1973).

=== Roar ===
As director, Marshall wrote, co-produced, and starred in the film Roar (1981), which revolved around big cats and featured actress Tippi Hedren, his stepdaughter Melanie Griffith, and his sons, John and Jerry. The idea for the film happened when Hedren finished filming Mr. Kingstreet's War in Africa. Both Marshall and Hedren saw a game warden's house in Zimbabwe overrun by lions, and learned about awareness for endangered animal and big cat species. The two conceived an idea for a film that the family could be a part of, which would center around many African cats. Marshall wrote the script, and gave the film a working title, which was Lions, Lions and More Lions. He also convinced Japanese and British investors to provide the funds for the movie. Marshall and Hedren approached animal trainers for support on the training of numerous big cats, and were told the idea was impossible, dismissing them both as "brainsick" and "completely and utterly insane" to allow big cats on-set without at least two experienced trainers for each animal. Hedren had originally wanted actor Jack Nicholson to play the role of biologist Hank, but Marshall himself took the role.

Production started in Santa Monica, California, in 1976; shooting for the film was scheduled to last six months but took 3 years to shoot, and 11 years to make. During that time, Marshall and his family began housing lions first at his Sherman Oaks home, a property he bought in Santa Clarita, and later in Acton, California. The animal cast eventually reached to 132 lions, tigers, leopards, cougars, and jaguars. Roar was accident-ridden due to the injuries inflicted on the cast and crew that were caused by the animals. Over 70 people are believed to have been injured, giving the film the title of the "most dangerous movie ever made". Marshall's attacks from the lions during scenes were life-threatening; his wounds from the scratches and lion bites became infected and later gave him gangrene. Other accidents included a flood from a broken dam, a fire, destroyed equipment, financial issues, and a feline virus which plagued most of the big cats.

Marshall used the proceeds from his executive position on The Exorcist to help fund the film, leading some of the crew to believe it was plagued by the "curse of The Exorcist" due to its financial association. After two years of production, most of the financiers had already pulled their money out. The finances restricted Marshall and his family from paying the animals' food bills and paying for the damages caused became a burden; investors gave payments of up to $1 million, but this barely paid back the debt. This resulted in their four houses being sold in order to pay the debt, and the entire production crew was fired to compensate for the losses. Marshall and Hedren decided to continue the production and rebuilt the sets that had been destroyed, and hired many different crew members to finish the film. The film's budget thus increased due to the issues and cost $17 million altogether. When it finally released outside of the U.S. in 1981 it received negative reviews and brought in $2 million (Note: John Marshall disputes this, and says that "$2 million is a long way off". He also claims that Noel said the movie made $10 million.) worldwide. It was screened for only a week in theaters.

After the filming of Roar, the big cats used were moved to the Shambala Preserve, established by Hedren.

=== Later pursuits ===
Marshall was slated to produce a film adaptation of the 1978 biographical novel Shadowland by William Arnold after Marie Yates, then Arnold's literary agent, negotiated a movie deal with Marshall. The rights for the film, called Frances, were sold by Yates to Brooksfilms, the production company of Mel Brooks. Marshall claimed that he offered her a better position in the film's production if she gave Brooks the rights without paying Marshall fees as co-producer, and to take Arnold out of the contract and easily "fuck Marshall". Arnold ended up filing a lawsuit against the company and producer Jonathan Sanger for copyright infringement.

A later film where Marshall was also credited as producer was A Night in the Life of Jimmy Reardon (1988), starring River Phoenix, though he never directed or acted in another film again. He left show business to run marketing for an HMO in Florida. The Daily Beast reports that he was working on a film script before his death.

== Personal life ==
Marshall and his first wife, Jaye Joseph Marshall, started a talent agency together. They divorced, and Marshall married Tippi Hedren in 1964, previously having been her agent and manager.

I would try to be in the scenes with Tippi and Melanie, because they felt better when I was nearby. We grouped together as a family. Not that we thought dad was really trying to kill us, but it really seemed like he was out for us for some reason.

— John Marshall, son of Noel Marshall and actor in Roar

After production of Roar, Marshall and Hedren divorced in 1982, with Hedren saying Marshall would constantly become aggressive when they fought, leading her to secure a restraining order against him, stating he could not physically abuse her or come within 20 feet of their home, and for him to also seek psychiatric care. Marshall's son John would confirm that the divorce was due to the events that happened during production. He reflected on numerous incidents, including Marshall's treatment of Griffith. He recalled that the cast had safewords when the scene became too risky, but when Griffith used hers, Marshall did not listen and kept filming. In a 2015 interview with Xfinity, he made a link between the treatment of the family during filming as the reason behind the divorce. John also said that behind the scenes, Marshall once struck John for standing up to him, and would tell Griffith to forget about her anxiety around the lions instead of taking action to protect her. Marshall was labeled "intense" by John, as he would often get angry on-set of the film and would shout at the cast, crew, and animal handlers when a take was ruined. John explained that Marshall's temper was aggravated by the hours it took to film scenes of the big cats that relied on waiting for the animals to do something that could be included in the film.

Marshall died of cancer on June 30, 2010, in Santa Monica, California.

== Filmography ==
Year	Film	Credited as				Role	Notes
Year	Film	Director	Producer	Screenwriter	Other	Role	Notes
1965	I'll Bet	No	No	No	Yes	Himself	Episode: Dwayne Hickman and wife Carol Christensen vs. Tippi Hedren and husband Noel Marshall
1971	Mister Kingstreet's War	No	Executive	No	No		
1973	The Harrad Experiment	No	Executive	No	No		
1973	The Exorcist	No	Executive	No	No		
1978	The Merv Griffin Show	No	No	No	Yes	Himself	Episode: Robert Klein, Betty White, Kay Starr, Tippi Hedren & Noel Marshall
1981	Roar	Yes	Yes	Yes	Actor	Hank	
1982	Blue Peter	No	No	No	Yes	Himself	
1988	A Night in the Life of Jimmy Reardon	No	Executive	No	No		
