= Natural Balance Pet Foods =

American pet food company

Natural Balance Pet Foods, Inc.
- Type: Subsidiary
- Industry: Food
- Founded: 1989; 37 years ago
- Founder: Dick Van Patten
- Headquarters: Burbank, CA, United States
- Area served: Worldwide
- Products: Dog food, cat food
- Owner: Nexus Capital Management LP
- Website: naturalbalanceinc.com

Dick Van Patten's Natural Balance Pet Foods is an American pet food manufacturer with its headquarters located in Burbank, Los Angeles, California. Established in 1989 by actor Dick Van Patten, the company markets itself as "Food For a Lifetime" and promotes itself as having "the finest food you can buy for your pet." A brand within the Ethos Pet Brands portfolio, Natural Balance was previously owned by the J.M. Smucker Company until February 2021, when it was sold to Nexus Capital Management LP and merged with Canidae Pet Food in 2023.

== History ==
Natural Balance began in 1989 when Van Patten was a guest on John Davidson's show. Van Patten had lunch with the show's band drummer, Joey Herrick, who rescued dogs and cats. Van Patten told him when he was a kid he had snakes, alligators, and other animals. The drummer and Van Patten had an idea of making a health food for dogs. At the time, Van Patten played tennis with a veterinarian and she said the best quality food should have no filler, no wheat, no corn, no soy, and no by-products.

Initially Natural Balance lost money, until the brand was picked up by Petco and featured in more than 625 stores.

The company has changed ownership several times. On May 22, 2013, Natural Balance merged with Del Monte Foods, maker of pet foods such as Kibbles 'n Bits, Meow Mix and Milo's Kitchen. In March 2015 The J.M. Smucker Company purchased Natural Balance Pet Foods and the Big Heart Pet Brands from Del Monte. The J.M. Smucker Company then sold the brand to Nexus Capital in January 2021 for $50 million. In August 2023, Natural Balance merged with Canidae Pet Food under Ethos Pet Brands. Nexus Capital and L Catterton have a 50-50 ownership of the merged organization.

== Products ==
The product line includes L.I.D. Limited Ingredient Diets, Original Ultra Whole Body Health, Vegetarian, and Wild Pursuit high protein diets.

=== Pet food formulas ===
Natural Balance has a large variety of both dog and cat formulas in dry, treats, rolls, or canned form, including:

- Limited Ingredient Diets-Dry Dog
- Limited Ingredient Diets-Wet Dog

=== Zoological formulas ===
Natural Balance was a member of Association of Zoos and Aquariums and has created zoological products that are formulated specifically for carnivores in zoos and wild animal parks and not sold to the general public. These foods were developed by Director of Zoological Product Research and Development Dr. Martin R. Dinnes, a founding member of the American College of Zoological Medicine.

Natural Balance's zoological formulas were used by, among others, Big Cat Rescue, Tippi Hedren's Shambala Preserve, Toledo Zoo, San Diego Zoo, San Diego Zoo Safari Park and SeaWorld.

== Programs ==
Natural Balance is the official dog food of the United States Bureau of Alcohol, Tobacco, Firearms and Explosives Arson Investigation and Explosives Detection Canines.

=== Honoring Service Dogs ===
In 2012, Natural Balance Pet Foods sponsored a float for the 2013 Rose Parade honoring military working dogs. The float, titled "Canines with Courage", was inspired by the planned Military Working Dog Teams National Monument in San Antonio, Texas. Natural Balance, Petco, and Maddie's Fund were among the sponsors funding the monument.

== Recalls ==
Natural Balance was one of the brands involved in the 2007 Melamine-Contaminated Pet Food Recalls. On April 16, 2007, the company informed the FDA that they had received complaints from consumers regarding a select amount of Venison & Brown Rice Dry Dog Food and Venison & Green Pea Dry Cat Food. Some animals were reported to have vomited and a few experienced kidney failures. Natural Balance immediately issued a voluntary recall for all its Venison dog products and its dry Venison cat food after lab results showed that some of the products contained trace amounts of melamine. The source of melamine was believed to be from rice protein concentrate.

On April 27, 2007, Natural Balance issued a second recall for three canned dog food and one canned cat food. Like the first recall, the contaminants were melamine in rice protein concentrates. As with the venison based formulas, rice protein concentrate was not on the list of ingredients of the four products. This time, Natural Balance claimed that their canned food manufacturer American Nutrition, Inc (ANI) added the rice protein concentrate without their knowledge or consent, calling it a "manufacturing deviation". In response, ANI issued a press release denying any deliberate or intentionally wrongful conduct, claiming that "customers specifically required rice-based formulations". Along with Natural Balance, other pet food organizations such as Blue Buffalo and Menu Foods were affected by the contaminated products and issued recalls.

Additionally, in July 2007, a small lot of certain Natural Balance canned pet foods were recalled after it was determined that they may have been involved in a large-scale Botulism outbreak, associated with its producer Castleberry's Food Company. No illnesses were reported with the pet food.

As a result of the 2007 recalls, the company built an ISO 17025-accredited laboratory to proactively test each production run of their products for nine different toxins before shipping the food to retailers.

On July 3, 2020, J.M. Smucker announced a voluntary recall of a single lot of Natural Balance Ultra Premium Chicken & Chicken Liver Paté Formula cat food upon discovering elevated levels of choline chloride after receiving complaints from cat owners whose pets had become sick after eating it. The company did not publicly divulge details as to which symptoms the affected cats had developed, but warned in its announcement that "Ingesting impacted product may cause nausea with excessive salivation, constricted pupils and poor vision, diarrhea or vomiting to more severe symptoms including difficulty walking, muscle shaking, tremors, irregular heartbeat, difficulty breathing, possible cardiac or respiratory failure and, in extreme situations, death."
