= Daughters, Daughters =

1974 film

- Film poster
- Directed by: Moshé Mizrahi
- Written by: Moshé Mizrahi; Shaike Ophir
- Produced by: Yoram Globus; Menahem Golan
- Starring: Shaike Ophir
- Cinematography: Adam Greenberg
- Edited by: Dov Hoenig
- Release date: 1973
- Running time: 100 minutes
- Country: Israel
- Language: Hebrew

Daughters, Daughters (Hebrew: אבו אל בנאת) is a 1973 Israeli film directed by Moshé Mizrahi, who also co-wrote the screenplay. It was entered into the 1974 Cannes Film Festival.

== Plot ==
Shabtai Alfandari (Shaike Ophir) is a pure Sephardic Jerusalemite, father to nine daughters, who yearns for a son who will one day say Kaddish for him after his death. Alfandari dreams about the son and plays with him in his dreams. He consults with sorcerers to remove the curse that prevents him from having a son. He arranges for his eldest daughter to marry his assistant in hopes that a male child will be born into the family, but another daughter is born instead.

== Cast ==
- Shaike Ophir - Sabbatai Alfandari
- Zaharira Harifai - Bianca Alfandari
- Joseph Shiloach - Joseph Omri
- Michal Bat-Adam - Esther Alfandari
- Gideon Singer - Dr. Mazor
- Avner Hizkiyahu - Casarola
- Naomi Blumenthal - Naomi Greenbaum
- David Baruch

== Screening ==
The film premiered a week before the outbreak of the Yom Kippur War, during which it achieved significant success, attracting approximately 50,000 viewers in its first week. However, the war's onset led to a sharp decline in audience numbers. In August 1974, the film returned to theaters but failed to replicate its initial success.

In the spring of 1974, the film competed for the Palme d'Or at the Cannes Film Festival, where audiences voted it the festival's most popular film.
