= The Garden (1977 film) =

Israeli drama by Victor Nord

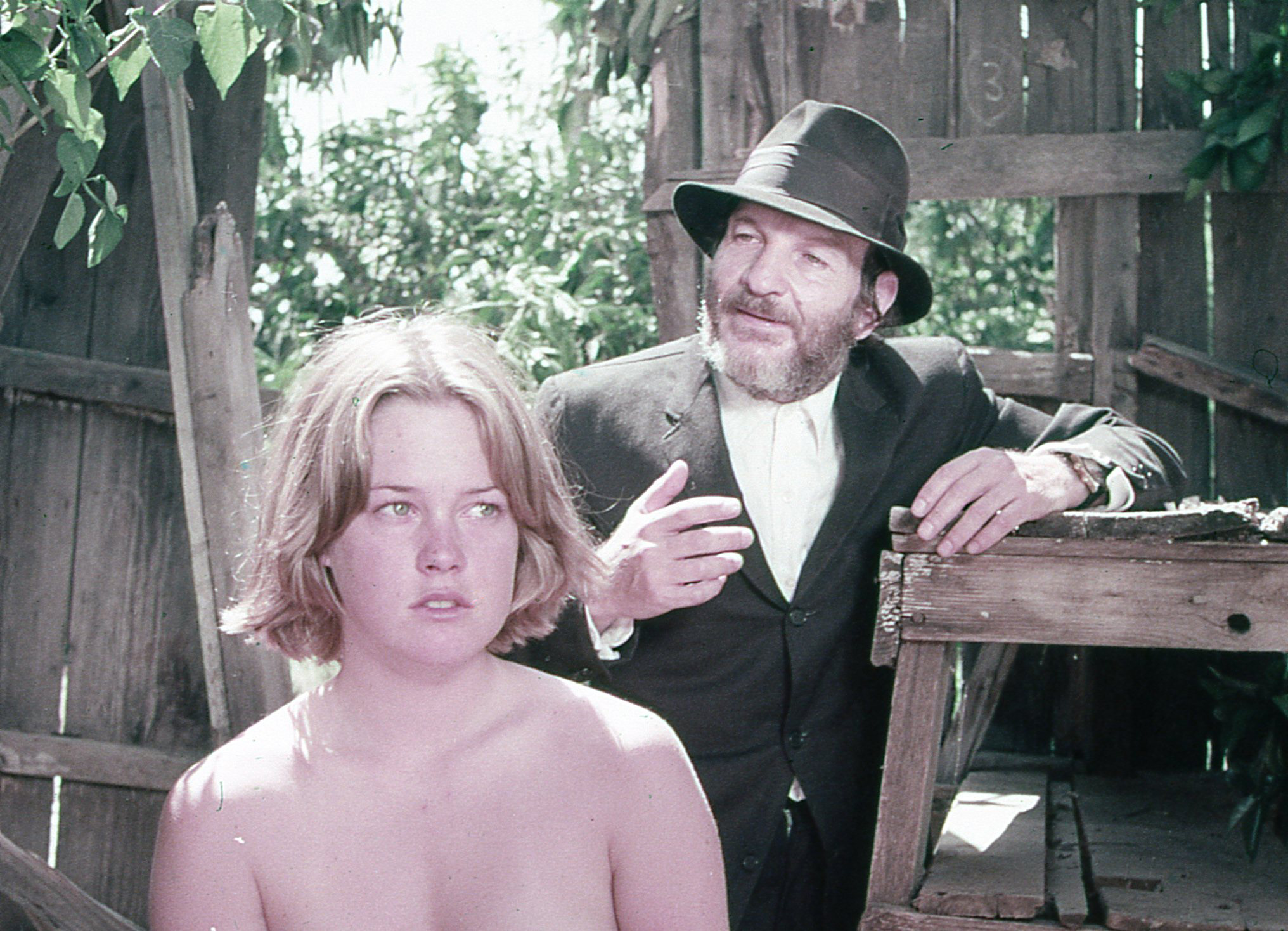
Melanie Griffith and Shaike Ophir

The Garden (Ha-Gan) is a 1977 Israeli drama film directed by Victor Nord, his first feature. It stars Shaike Ophir, Melanie Griffith, Zachi Noy, Sa'adia Damari, and Shoshana Duer. The film is about a wandering young woman (Griffith) who, after a sexual assault, stumbles upon an old man who faces eviction from his garden. The old man mistakes her for an angel.

The Garden was the official Israeli entry at the International Cannes Film festival (Les Yeux Fertiles section), 1977, San Francisco International Film festival, October 1977, and many other film forums.

== Reception ==
Variety wrote: "The Garden" is a beautiful film, a poem of sound and visual effects ... Shai K. Ofir is moving in his portrayal of the pious old man, stubborn yet naive and sensitive. The dumb girl is played gracefully by American actress, Melanie Griffith". (Victor Nord, the director) "proves to have a marvelous sense of beauty and works well with actors. ...The music by Noam Sharif gives an extra dimension." ("Variety", Wednesday, June 1, 1977/ Film reviews, page 16)
