= Shaike Ophir =

Israeli actor (1928–1987)

- שייקה אופיר
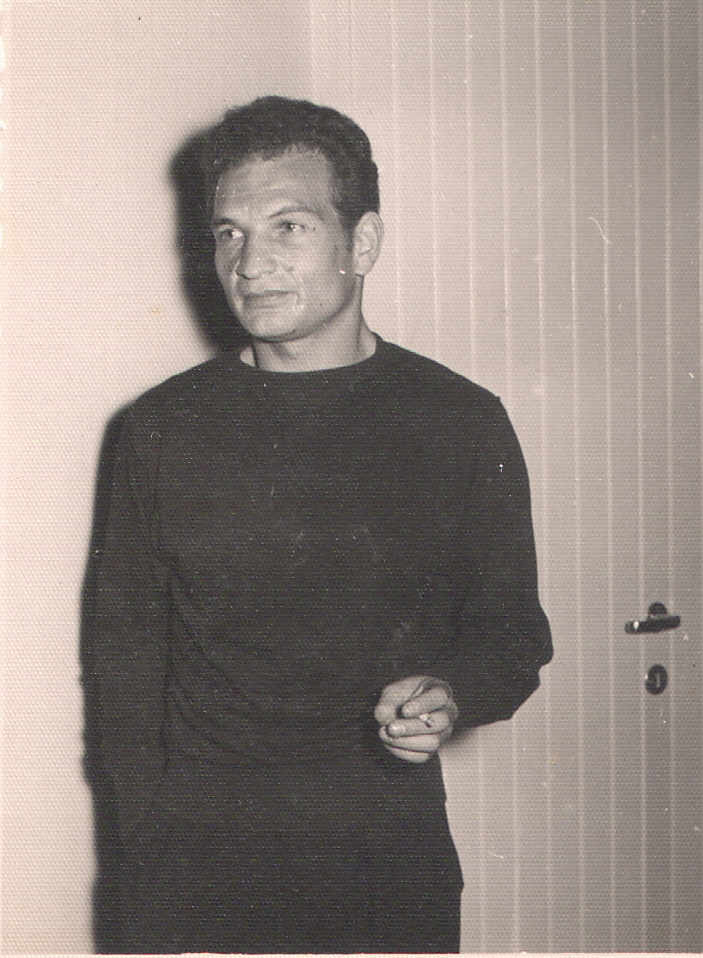
- Born: Yeshayahu Goldstein; 4 November 1928; Jerusalem, Mandatory Palestine
- Died: 17 August 1987 (aged 58); Tel Aviv, Israel
- Occupations: Actor; comedian; playwright; screenwriter; director; mime
- Years active: 1947–1987
- Spouse(s): Ohela Halevi (m. 1948; div. 1961) Lidya Schumacher (m. 1972)
- Children: 4, including Karin Ophir

Shaike Ophir (Hebrew: שייקה אופיר; 4 November 1928 – 17 August 1987) was an Israeli actor, comedian, playwright, screenwriter, director, and the country's first mime.

== Early life ==
Yeshayahu (Shaike) Goldstein was born in Jerusalem near the Mea Shearim neighborhood, to Shimon and Shifra (née Weisfish) Goldstein. His family was Masortiim, and his Ashkenazi Jewish ancestry in the city goes back to the mid-19th century. He grew up in a multilingual environment, such that while he learned Yiddish at home, he also absorbed Ladino and Arabic in his environs. He was educated in Jerusalem's Alliance and the Lycée Français de Jérusalem.

He studied acting as an adolescent, and was intending to work as a post office clerk, but left school at age 14 to enlist in the Palmach. As he was underage at the time, he lied about his age and was able to join. He would go on to say that his service in the Palmach was among the most important periods of his life. He volunteered for the Palyam, the naval wing of the Palmach, though he was expelled from the courses due to disciplinary infractions.

During his time in the Palmach, he met Dan Ben-Amotz and Haim Hefer, and it was at the latter's suggestion that he decided to change his name to Shaike Ophir. Upon completing his service in the Palmach in 1946, upon Dan Ben-Amotz's recommendation, he was accepted to the acting studio of the Ohel Theater.

During the 1948 Arab-Israeli War, he was re-drafted to the military. He escorted convoys to the besieged city of Jerusalem, and took part in naval battles. Later on, thanks to his comic skills he joined the Chizbatron, a comedy and entertainment troupe of the Israeli military. Performing alongside him in the troupe were Naomi Polani, Gideon Singer, Shlomo Bar-Shavit, and others. He soon became one of the troupe's leading stars.

== Career ==
In the 1950s, he made a name for himself as a multi-talented performer. He had even recorded a few hit songs during this period. He married the singer Ohela Halevy, whose father Moshe Halevy had been the founder of the Ohel Theater.

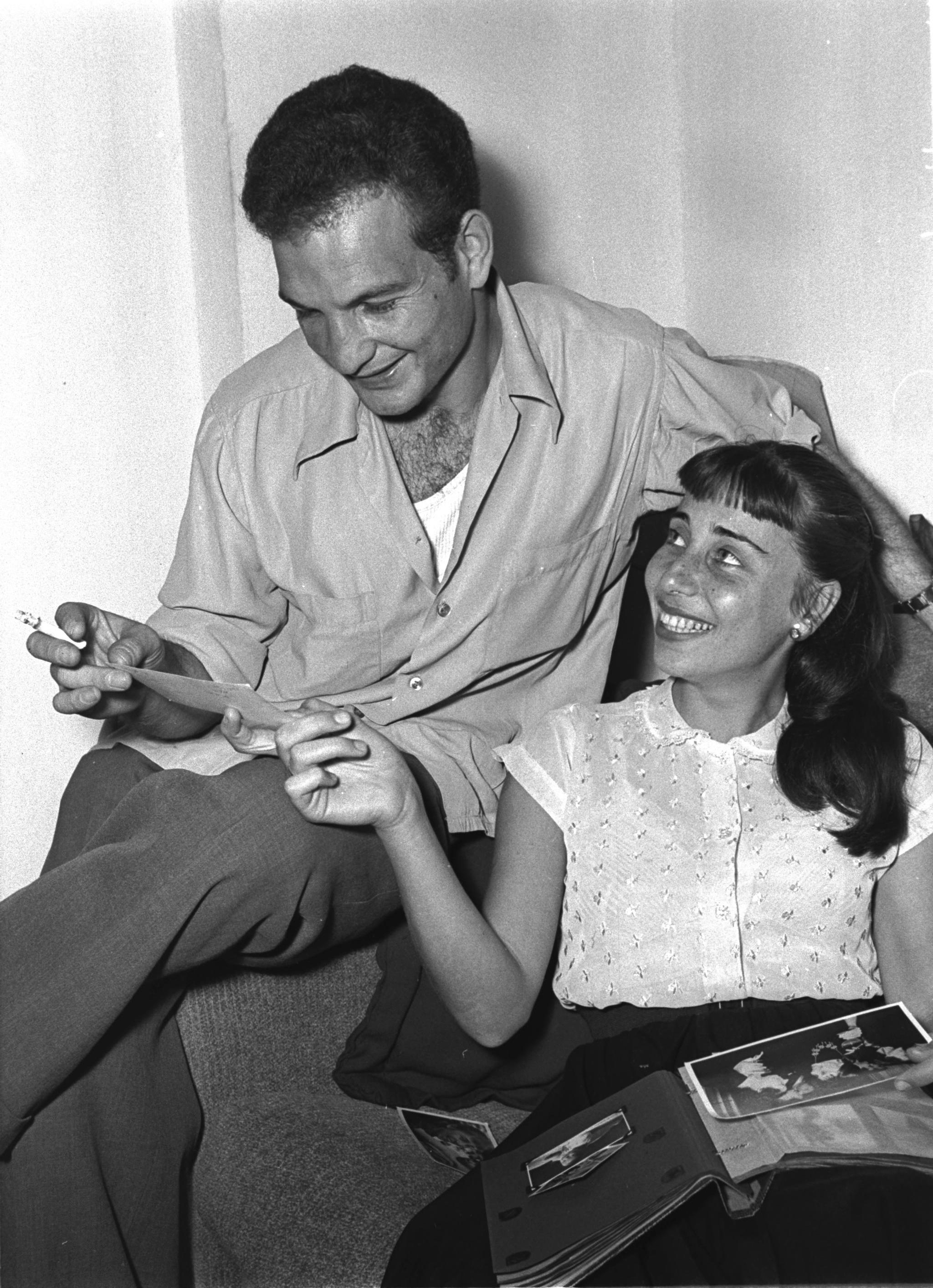
Shaike Ophir and his first wife, Ohela Halevi, 1954

In 1950, Ophir went to Paris to learn pantomime under the actor Étienne Decroux, and performed with Marcel Marceau. He returned to Israel in 1952, and set up a pantomime theater under the auspices of the Cameri Theater.

In 1956, Ophir and his wife and children moved to the United States for a period that would last four and a half years. During the late 1950s and early 1960s, Ophir occasionally guest-starred in American TV shows such as Shirley Temple's Storybook and Alfred Hitchcock Presents (in the episode "The Waxwork," where he was billed as Shai K. Ophir). In this period, he also performed with Marlene Dietrich, was invited to replace Sammy Davis Jr. in a performance before the UN, and even put on a one-man show on Broadway.

Upon his return to Israel, Ophir directed the first two productions of the new comedy trio HaGashash HaHiver ("The Pale Tracker"), and wrote sketches for them.

Ophir acted in 28 films, wrote, directed, and starred in several variety shows. He reached the peak of his international fame in the title role of Ha-Shoter Azoulay (literally, Officer Azoulay, translated as The Policeman), a film-vehicle by Ephraim Kishon which won a Golden Globe for Best Foreign-Language Film (1972) and was nominated for a Best Foreign Language Academy Award the same year. He also starred in other Ephraim Kishon films, including Ervinka, Blaumilch Canal and The Fox in the Chicken Coop, and the 1973 Moshé Mizrahi film Daughters, Daughters. In 1977, he starred opposite Melanie Griffith in The Garden.

In 1985, Ophir starred in a stage adaptation of Janusz Korczak's children's novel King Matt the First, where he played seven different roles. The play was very successful and ran for three years. Over this period Ophir was diagnosed with lung cancer, to which he succumbed in 1987. He also directed the Israeli movie Hamesh Ma'ot Elef Shahor (Five Hundred Thousand Black or Half a Million Black), and wrote the screenplay for 4 Israeli movies. He wrote and performed many sketches and comedy routines, many of which are still popular in Israel today. He also did a series of Arabic-instruction TV programs that ran through the 1980s.

He also appeared in the Chuck Norris film, The Delta Force.

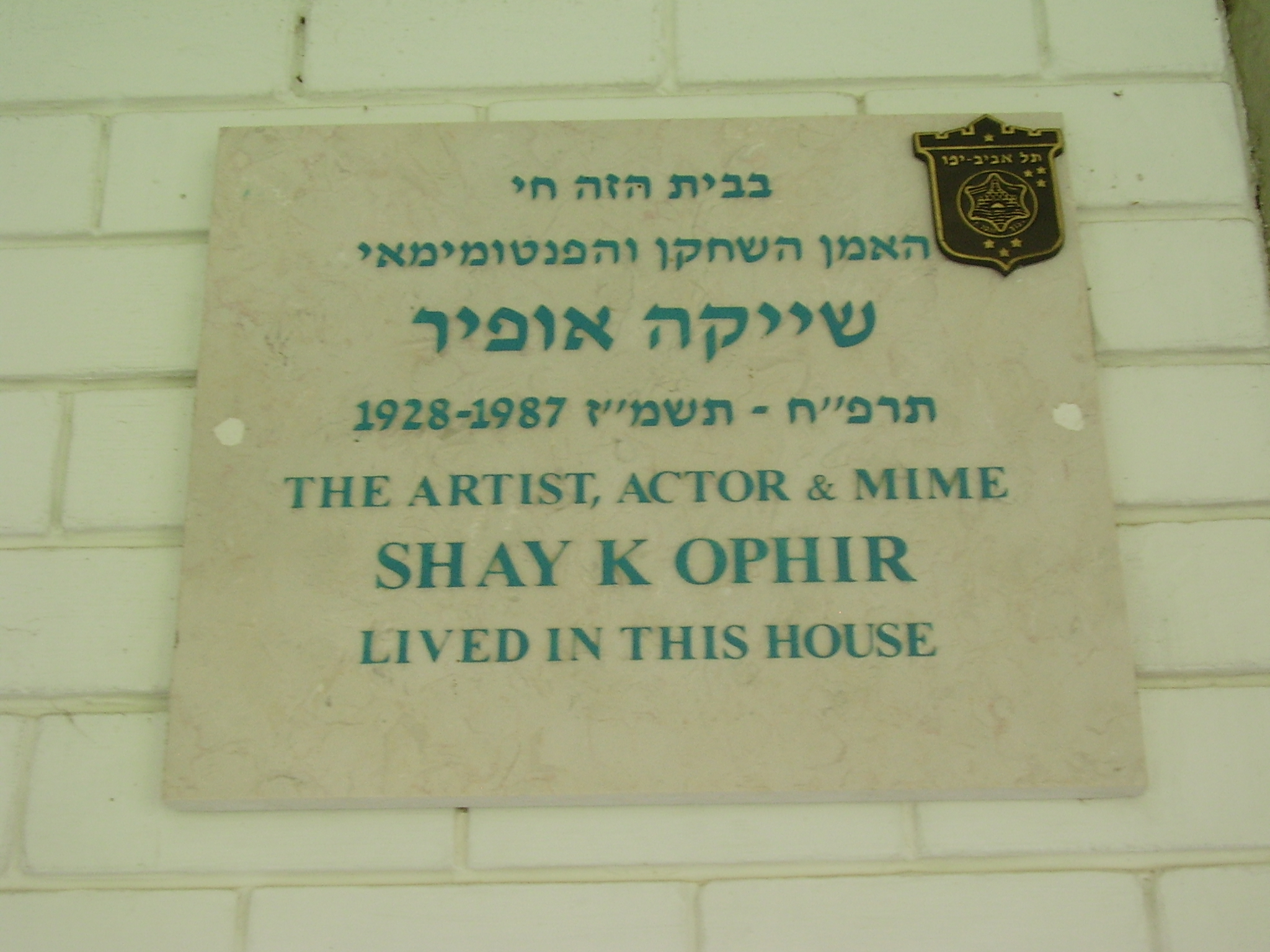
Sign at Ophir's house in Tel Aviv

== Personal life ==
Ophir was married twice. From his marriage to Ohela Halevi (1928-2010), he had two children, Elad (1951-2012), and Atalia. From his second marriage, to Lidya Schumacher (1936-2018), daughter of the Yiddish actor Israel Schumacher, he had two more children: Alexander-Gigi, and the actress Karin Ophir.

Shaike Ophir, a heavy smoker, died from lung cancer on 17 August 1987 in Tel Aviv at the age of 58.

== Filmography ==
- 1956: B'Ein Moledet
- 1956: Ma'aseh B'Monit .... Soldier
- 1959: Alfred Hitchcock Presents (Season 4 Episode 27: "The Waxwork") .... Bourdette
- 1963: El Dorado .... Shneider
- 1964: Shemona B'Ekevot Ahat
- 1964: Hor B'Levana
- 1964: Dalia Vehamalahim
- 1966: Moishe Ventilator
- 1967: Ervinka .... The Sergeant
- 1968: Ha-Shehuna Shelanu
- 1969: Blaumilch Canal .... Police Officer
- 1971: The Policeman .... Constable Sergeant Abraham Azulai
- 1972: Shod Hatelephonim Hagadol
- 1973: Daughters, Daughters .... Sabbatai Alfandari
- 1973: The House on Chelouche Street .... Haim
- 1975: Yi'ihiyeh Tov Salmonico
- 1975: Diamonds .... Moshe
- 1977: Hamesh Ma'ot Elef Shahor
- 1977: The Garden .... Avram
- 1977: Gonev Miganav Patoor
- 1977: Operation Thunderbolt .... Gadi Arnon
- 1978: Ha-Shu'al B'Lool Hatarnagalot .... Amitz Dolniker
- 1979: The Magician of Lublin .... Schmul
- 1979: Ta'ut Bamispar .... Superintendent Moshe Cohen
- 1985: King Solomon's Mines .... Kassam
- 1986: The Delta Force .... Father Nicholas
- 1986: America 3000 .... Lelz
- 1987: Sleeping Beauty .... Master Elf (final film role)

== Awards and commemoration ==
The Israeli Film Academy award was renamed to the "Ophir Award" in his honor in 2004.
