= American Sanctuary Association =

American non-profit organization

- Abbreviation: ASA
- Founded: 1998; 28 years ago
- Type: National not-for-profit organization
- Legal status: 501(c)(3) nonprofit organization
- Purpose: Accrediting animal sanctuaries and assisting in the rescue and placement of homeless animals.
- Headquarters: Las Vegas, Nevada, U.S.
- Region served: North America
- Method: Accreditation
- President: Tippi Hedren
- Website: www.americansanctuaryassociation.org

The American Sanctuary Association (ASA) was a 501(c)(3) nonprofit organization founded in 1998 to set standards for animal care and housing. The goal of ASA was to link sanctuary directors and founders in order to share experiences and to enable unwanted and wild unreleasable animals to find safe haven. The ASA was headquartered in Las Vegas, Nevada, United States.

As of 2024, the organization is believed to be closed. It does not appear in the database of IRS Tax Exempt Organizations, its website URL is a casino promotion, and it's social media feed is no longer being updated. Founder Vernon Weir died in December of 2021 and a successor was not publicly announced.

== History ==
ASA was founded in 1998 in large part to fill the role for animal sanctuaries that the Association of Zoos and Aquariums fills for zoos, and in disagreement with the prevailing accreditation standards. Actress and animal activist Tippi Hedren, founder of the Shambala Preserve, was elected as the first President. Vernon Weir was ASA's first Executive Director and served in that role for 22 years.

== Accreditation ==
ASA served as an accrediting body for animal sanctuaries, ensuring that ASA accrediting facilities met higher standards of animal care than required by U.S. law. As of 2019, the ASA had 50 accredited sanctuaries in the United States.

To receive accreditation by the ASA, a sanctuary must first submit an application demonstrating that it meets the ASA's criteria. Once the application receives preliminary approval, ASA conducts a site visit before granting accreditation. Among other things, the ASA looks at the sanctuary's financials, nonprofit status, APHIS inspection reports, habitat designs, food prep areas, staff and board of directors, emergency procedures, and general condition of the sanctuary and its inhabitants.

== Placement ==
ASA did not have a sanctuary facility of its own, but assisted accredited sanctuaries with animal placement. Unlike wildlife rehabilitation centers, wildlife sanctuaries provide homes to wild animals that have been deemed non-releasable, usually due to injuries or habituation to humans. Some animal sanctuaries specialize in wildlife; others work with domestic animals and livestock. ASA helped to find the right sanctuary to house specific animals in need of homes.

== See also ==
- Global Federation of Animal Sanctuaries
