= Melanie Griffith =

American actress (born 1957)

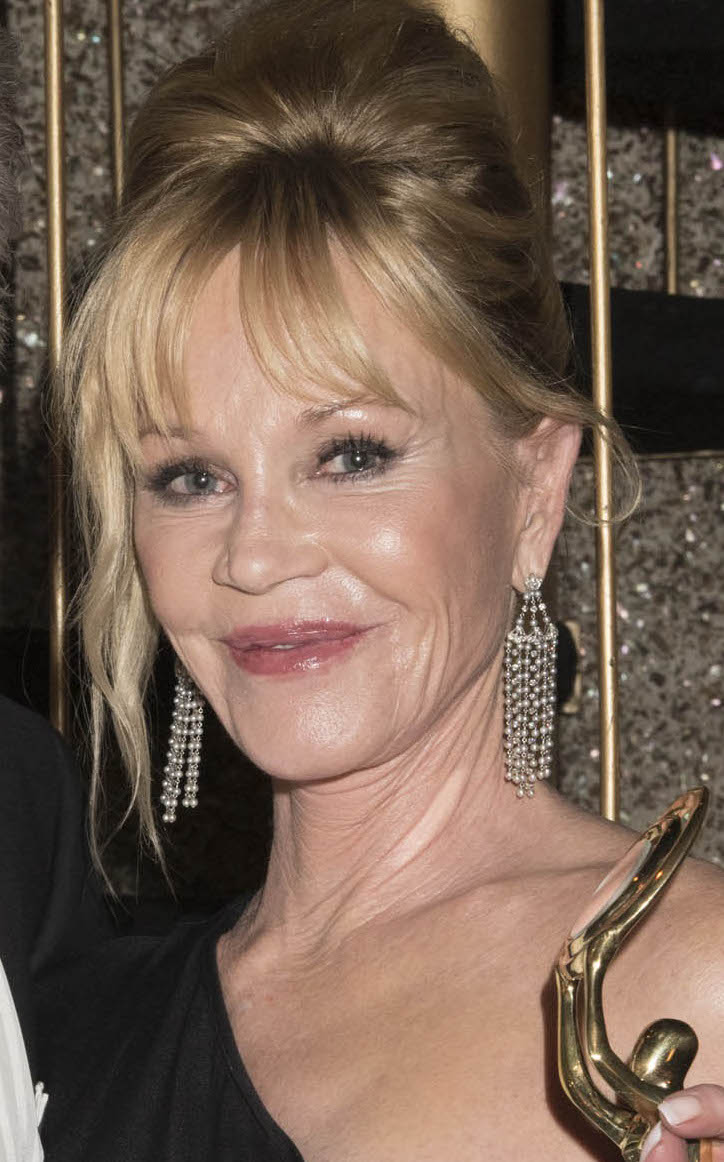
- Griffith in 2016
- Born: Melanie Richards Griffith; August 9, 1957 (age 69); New York City, U.S.
- Occupation: Actress
- Years active: 1958–present
- Spouses: Don Johnson (m. 1976; div. 1976) (m. 1989; div. 1996) Steven Bauer (m. 1981; div. 1989) Antonio Banderas (m. 1996; div. 2015)
- Children: 3, including Dakota
- Parents: Tippi Hedren; Peter Griffith
- Relatives: Tracy Griffith (half-sister)

Melanie Richards Griffith (born August 9, 1957) is an American actress. Born in Manhattan to actress Tippi Hedren, she was raised mainly in Los Angeles, where she graduated from the Hollywood Professional School at age 16. In 1975, 17-year-old Griffith appeared opposite Gene Hackman in Arthur Penn's neo-noir film Night Moves. She later rose to prominence as an actor in films including Brian De Palma's Body Double (1984), which earned her a National Society of Film Critics Award for Best Supporting Actress. Griffith's subsequent performance in the comedy Something Wild (1986) attracted critical acclaim before she was cast in 1988's Working Girl, which earned her a nomination for the Academy Award for Best Actress and won her a Golden Globe.

In the 1990s, Griffith performed in a series of roles which received varying critical reception. She received Golden Globe nominations for her performances in Buffalo Girls (1995), and as Marion Davies in RKO 281 (1999), while also earning a Golden Raspberry Award for Worst Actress for her performances in Shining Through (1992), as well as receiving nominations for Crazy in Alabama (1999) and John Waters' cult film Cecil B. Demented (2000). Other credits include John Schlesinger's Pacific Heights (1990), Milk Money (1994), the neo-noir film Mulholland Falls (1996), as Charlotte Haze in Adrian Lyne's Lolita (1997), and Another Day in Paradise (1998).

She provided the voice of Margalo in Stuart Little 2 (2002), and later starred as Barbara Marx in The Night We Called It a Day (2003), and spent the majority of the 2000s appearing on such television series as Nip/Tuck, Raising Hope, and Hawaii Five-0. After acting on stage in London, in 2003, she made her Broadway debut in a revival of the musical Chicago, receiving celebratory reviews. In the 2010s, Griffith returned to film, starring opposite her then-husband Antonio Banderas in the science-fiction film Autómata (2014) and as an acting coach in James Franco's The Disaster Artist (2017).

== Life and career ==
=== 1957–1969: Early life ===
Melanie Richards Griffith was born on August 9, 1957, in Manhattan, New York City, to actress Tippi Hedren and Peter Griffith, a former child stage actor and advertising executive. Griffith's paternal ancestry is English, as well as Welsh, Scots-Irish, Native Irish, and Scottish, while her maternal ancestry is Swedish, Norwegian, and German. Her parents separated when she was two years old, after which she relocated to Los Angeles with her mother. On February 4, 1961, Griffith's father married model and actress Nanita Greene and had two more children: Tracy Griffith, who also became an actress, and Clay A. Griffith, a set designer. Her mother married agent and producer Noel Marshall on September 27, 1964.

During her childhood and adolescent years, she lived part of the time in New York with her father and part-time in Antelope Valley, California, where her mother founded the animal preserve Shambala. Griffith appeared in advertisements and briefly worked as a child model before abandoning the career, citing extreme shyness as the reason. While attending the Hollywood Professional School, Griffith was advanced in her studies, which allowed her to skip a grade level and graduate at age 16.

=== 1969–1979: Career beginnings and first marriage ===
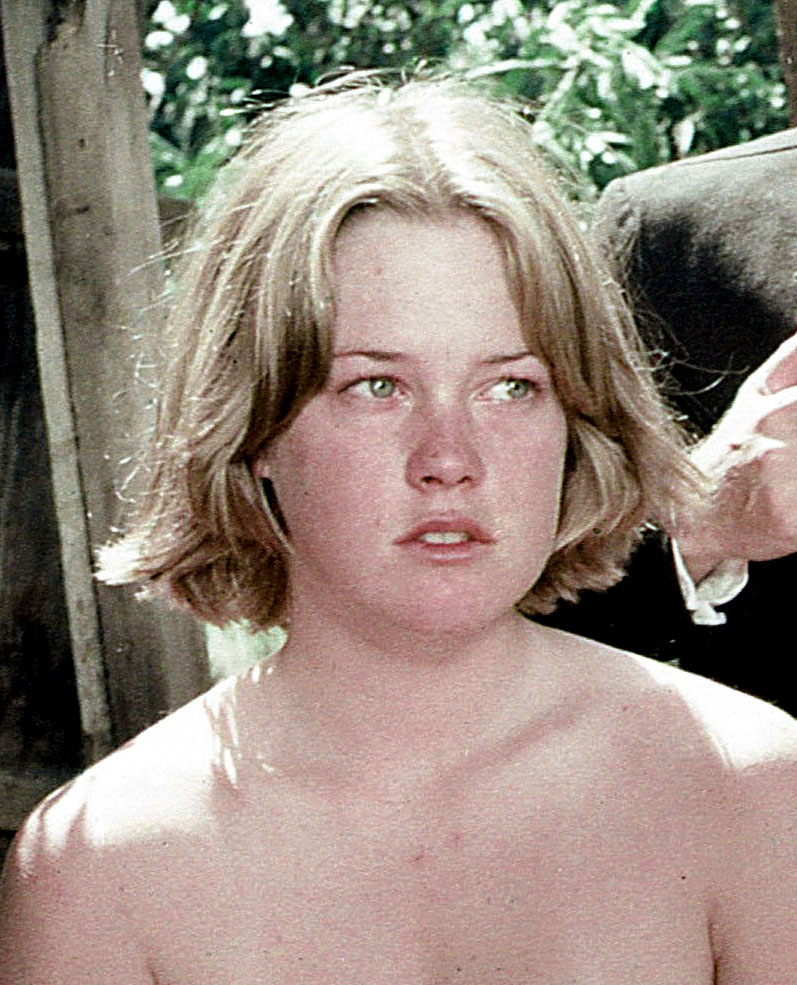
Griffith in The Garden (1977)

Griffith's first onscreen appearances were as an extra in Smith! (1969) and The Harrad Experiment (1973). She had her first major role at age 17 in Arthur Penn's film noir Night Moves (1975), in which she portrayed a runaway teenager pursued across the United States by a private detective, portrayed by Gene Hackman. In the film, she controversially appeared onscreen nude in several scenes. Griffith's performance in Night Moves drew attention to her and she was subsequently cast in two 1975 films: the comedy Smile, playing a pageant contestant, and Stuart Rosenberg's The Drowning Pool, a thriller in which she portrayed the daughter of a Louisiana woman (played by Joanne Woodward) involved in a crime investigation. She was also named Miss Golden Globe for 1975, helping out at the Golden Globe Awards. A contemporaneous profile of Griffith in Newsweek addressed her image at the time, in which it was noted: "She has the body of a sensuous woman, the pouting, chipmunk face of a teenager, and the voice of a child–and, suddenly, she's showing them all."

While on the set of The Harrad Experiment, 14-year-old Griffith met actor Don Johnson, then 22. The two began dating, and the relationship culminated in a six-month marriage from January to July 1976. After divorcing Johnson, Griffith subsequently dated Ryan O'Neal, who was 16 years her senior. In her autobiography, A Paper Life, Tatum O'Neal alleged that Griffith dragged her into an orgy with Maria Schneider and a male hairdresser during the time of her father's relationship with Griffith.

In 1977, she had a supporting part playing a hitchhiker in the Lamont Johnson-directed sports drama One on One. Griffith appeared in the Israeli experimental film The Garden, in which she portrayed a naked mute woman in Jerusalem whom a man mistakes for an angel. The same year, she had a supporting role in Joyride opposite Robert Carradine, in which she played a young woman who leaves California with her boyfriend, hoping to start a fishing company in Alaska.

=== 1980–1988: Breakthrough and motherhood ===
Griffith appeared opposite her mother, Hedren, in the film Roar (1981), directed by her then-stepfather Noel Marshall. In the film, she portrayed the daughter of animal-keepers Madeleine (Hedren) and Hank (Marshall), whose various wild animals turn on them. Roar was a project devised by Hedren and Marshall, and has retrospectively been deemed one of the most dangerous film productions of all time. Filming of Roar had begun in 1970 and was intermittent over the following decade. On one occasion during the shoot, Griffith was mauled by a lion and had to undergo facial reconstructive surgery. Her attack and injury is visible in the finished film. Also in 1981, Griffith appeared as a Women's Army Corps recruit in the made-for-television film She's in the Army Now (1981) with Jamie Lee Curtis and Steven Bauer. Shortly after completing the film, Griffith and Bauer married.

Griffith's well-known drug and alcohol addictions temporarily stalled her career in the early 1980s, but she made a comeback at age 26 with her role as a pornographic film actor in the Brian De Palma thriller Body Double (1984). The film, although a commercial failure, earned her the National Society of Film Critics Award for Best Supporting Actress. That same year, she had a co-starring role in Abel Ferrara's thriller Fear City, playing a stripper and prostitute in Times Square being stalked by a serial killer. Griffith gave birth to her first child, Alexander Griffith Bauer, on August 22, 1985, with Bauer. The following year, she had her first starring role opposite Jeff Daniels in Jonathan Demme's comedy Something Wild (1986), playing a mysterious woman who becomes involved with a straightlaced banker on a chance meeting. Critic Roger Ebert wrote of her acting: "Griffith's performance is based not so much on eroticism as on recklessness: She is able to convince us (and Daniels) that she is capable of doing almost anything, especially if she thinks it might frighten him." Griffith's performance earned her a Golden Globe Award nomination for Best Actress in a Motion Picture Comedy or Musical.

Griffith also starred in the speculative science fiction film Cherry 2000, which followed a business executive in the year 2017, and his relationship with a sex robot. She subsequently starred opposite Sean Bean, Tommy Lee Jones, and Sting in Mike Figgis's neo-noir Stormy Monday (1988), portraying an American woman who becomes embroiled in her ex-boss's plot to acquire a jazz club in Newcastle upon Tyne. Janet Maslin of The New York Times praised Griffith's performance, writing: "The stellar Miss Griffith, with her sexy, singular blend of kittenishness and strength, is entirely at home here, making an irrevocably strong impression."

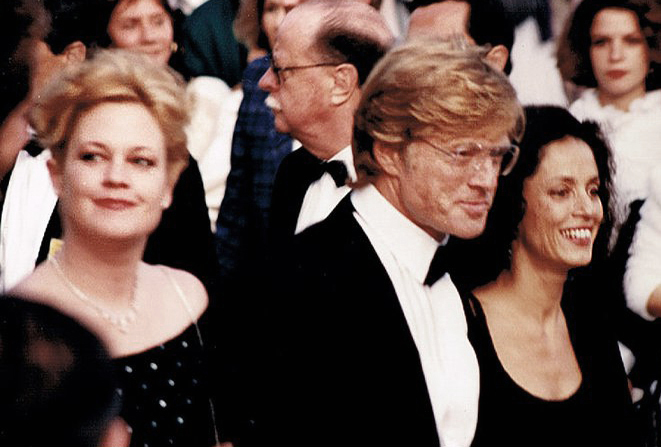
Griffith with Robert Redford and Sônia Braga, Cannes Film Festival 1988

Griffith achieved mainstream success when Mike Nichols cast her as spunky secretary Tess McGill in the box-office hit Working Girl (1988), co-starring Harrison Ford, Sigourney Weaver, Alec Baldwin, and Joan Cusack. Variety noted of her performance: "Griffith stands apart, both for her eagerness to break out of her clerical rut and her tenacity dealing with whomever seems to be thwarting her." Griffith was nominated for an Academy Award for Best Actress for her performance, and won a Golden Globe Award for Best Actress in a Musical or Comedy. The film marked a professional shift for Griffith earning her accolades as an A-list actress, characterized in a 1989 Rolling Stone piece: "Before Working Girl, Melanie Griffith was known mostly for her beautiful body and the way that nearly half her directors suggested she expose it."

Griffith and Bauer separated prior to her appearance in Working Girl. Griffith later admitted to having problems with cocaine and liquor after her split from Bauer. "What I did was drink myself to sleep at night," she said. "If I wasn't with someone, I was an unhappy girl." In 1988, after completing rehabilitation, Griffith reconnected with Johnson, and the two remarried on June 26, 1989.

=== 1989–1995: Mainstream success ===
On October 4, 1989, Griffith gave birth to her second child, daughter Dakota Johnson, with Don Johnson. After her pregnancy, Griffith began filming the thriller Pacific Heights (1990), directed by John Schlesinger, in which she portrayed a woman, who along with her boyfriend, becomes embroiled in a dispute with a criminal boarder in their San Francisco home. Critic Roger Ebert gave the film a middling review, and characterized it as "a horror film for yuppies". The same year, she reunited with De Palma in The Bonfire of the Vanities, a black comedy in which she portrayed a Southern belle gold-digger. Peter Travers of Rolling Stone panned the film, noting that it "achieves a consistency of ineptitude rare even in this era of over-inflated cinematic air bags... Griffith has the curves and the Southern-belle voice of McCoy's mistress, Maria Ruskin, but the script robs this magnolia of her steel."

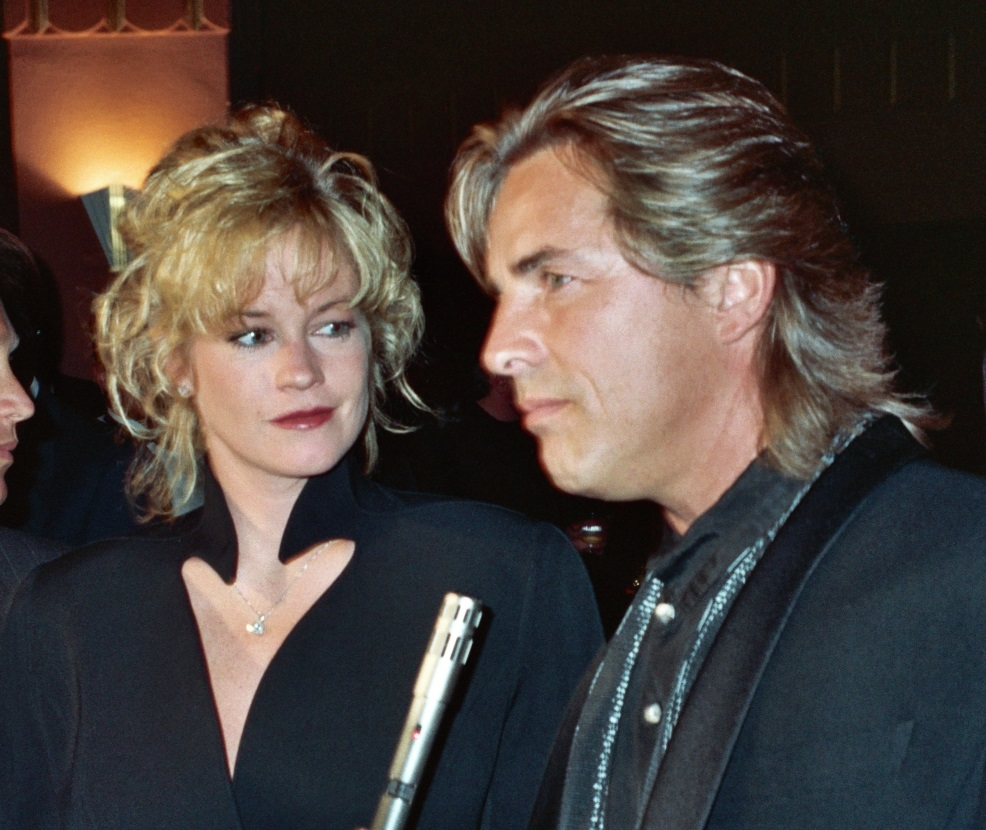
Griffith with then-husband Don Johnson at the APLA benefit in September 1990; she and Johnson appeared in two films together in the 1990s.

She was then cast in a lead role in Paradise (1991), a remake of the 1987 French film The Grand Highway, opposite then-husband Don Johnson, Elijah Wood, and Thora Birch. In the film, Griffith portrayed a woman reeling from the death of her child, who takes in her friend's son. Owen Gleiberman of Entertainment Weekly criticized Griffith's "cuddly, melting softness" in the film as being at odds with her character: "The way that Griffith has been directed, Lily never seems less than supremely nurturing. And so the movie — unlike, say, The Doctor — pulls back from revealing the dark side of an ordinary person's anguish." In 1992, she starred as Linda Voss, a German Jewish secretary in Berlin, opposite Michael Douglas in Shining Through, a World War II-set drama based on the 1988 novel of the same name. Desson Howe of The Washington Post was critical of Griffith's portrayal of a German accent, writing: "In all fairness, Griffith shouldn't be lambasted for her incompetent accent. She should be lambasted for her acting, too. That baby voice of hers -- what's the deal with that? It's a liability in most of her movies. Here, it's completely ludicrous." Peter Travers of Rolling Stone, however, noted Griffith as being "cannily cast" and "just about perfect".

She followed this with the Sidney Lumet-directed A Stranger Among Us, in which she portrayed a police officer posing as an Orthodox Jew while investigating a murder. Jay Boyar of the Orlando Sentinel criticized Griffith's speaking in the film, writing: "When Griffith tries to speak in the crude manner of a streetwise cop, her baby-doll voice turns the words into strained peaches. And while she's capable of projecting the wounded quality that the role demands, she's completely unconvincing when it comes to conveying a detective's intelligence... The miraculous thing about A Stranger Among Us is that Melanie Griffith's performance doesn't entirely ruin it. In fact, though the movie has other problems, there are sections that work quite well."

In the summer of 1992, Griffith filmed the comedy Born Yesterday (1993), a remake of the 1950 film, in the role for which Judy Holliday won an Academy Award for Best Actress. Billie Dawn is a naive, uneducated showgirl whose wealthy, powerful, and crude long-term fiancé (John Goodman) hires a reporter (Don Johnson) to give her enough polish to make her presentable as his wife in Washington, D.C. "This is supposed to be snappy material, and it comes across gloomy", Roger Ebert wrote at the time. He faulted the "dumbed down" screenplay, the casting and the lack of chemistry in a film that, in the end, was "morose and mean". In 1994, Griffith headlined the romantic comedy Milk Money, playing a prostitute. Janet Maslin of The New York Times deemed the film a "brainless comedy," adding: "The film may try to renounce its own tawdriness, but not Ms. Griffith; she brings a certain irrepressible gusto to her role. Among the few genuinely amusing scenes here are those that show her flouncing through the small town where Frank and Dad live, scandalizing the locals and even finding one ex-client strolling with his wife on Main Street." The same year, she had a supporting role in Nobody's Fool, a drama starring Paul Newman, Jessica Tandy, and Bruce Willis. In the film, Griffith portrays the wife of a contractor (Willis) who has disputes with a free-spirited older man (Newman) in an upstate New York town. Kenneth Turan of the Los Angeles Times noted both Willis and Griffith as "somewhat less reliable" than Newman and Tandy.

Griffith and husband Johnson separated in March 1994, reconciled later that year, but separated again in May 1995, eventually divorcing in 1996. In the midst of her separation, she appeared in an ensemble cast in the coming-of-age drama Now and Then, playing an actress who returns to her Indiana hometown to reunite with her childhood friends. Roger Ebert wrote of the film: "The adult actresses are completely superfluous to the movie, which is a contrived Stand by Me kind of story." The same year, she starred opposite Anjelica Huston and Reba McEntire in the Western miniseries Buffalo Girls, based on the 1990 novel of the same name. Tom Shales of The Washington Post wrote of the series that "Huston, Griffith, and McEntire make it not just bigger than life but, at times, better." For her performance, she was nominated for Golden Globe Award for Best Supporting Actress in a Series, Miniseries or Television film.

=== 1996–2002: Independent films and producing ===
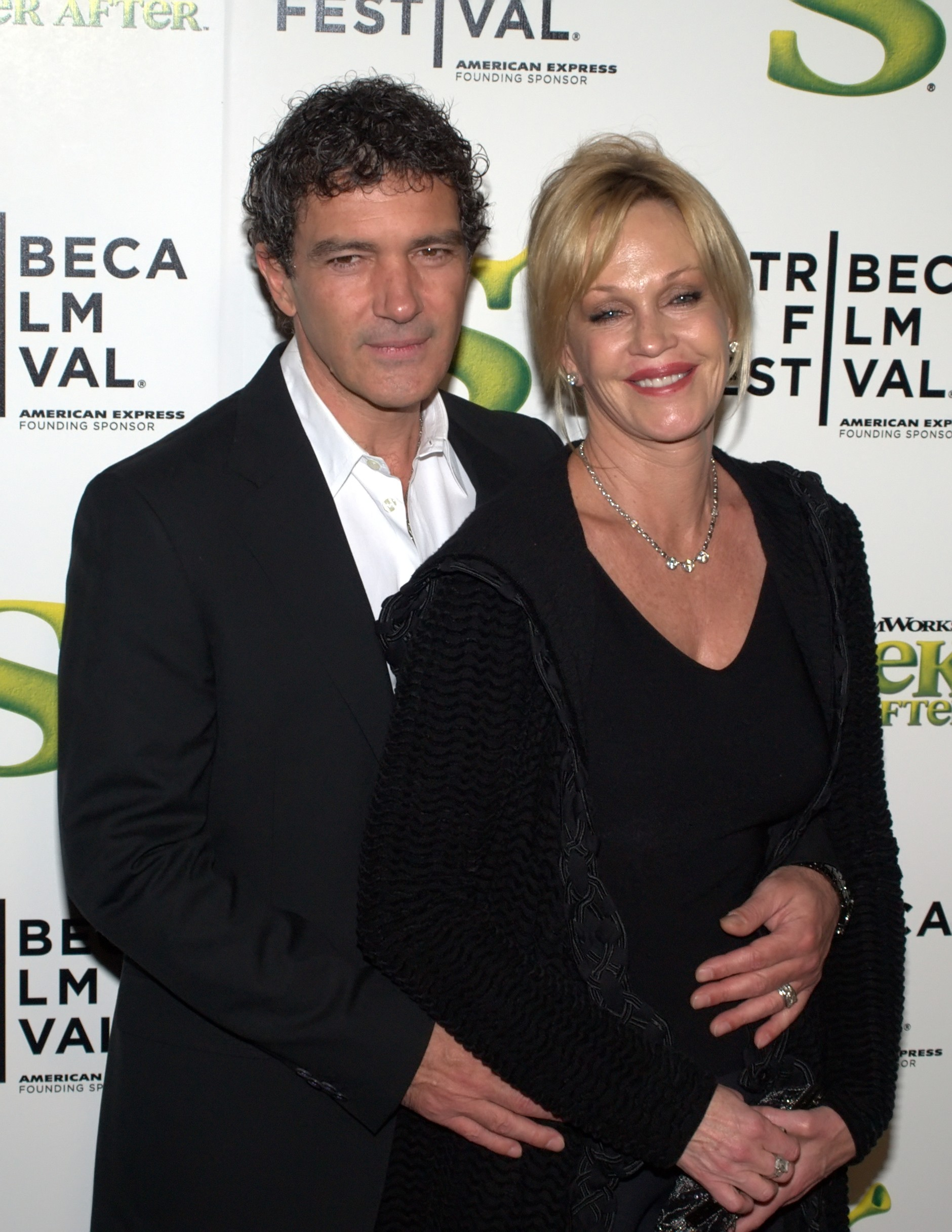
Griffith and then-husband Antonio Banderas at the 2010 Tribeca Film Festival

In 1996, Griffith co-starred with Antonio Banderas in the comedy Two Much. She and Banderas began a relationship during the film's production, and were married that year. After their respective divorces were finalized, Griffith and Banderas married on May 14, 1996, at Marylebone Town Hall in London. Their daughter, Stella del Carmen Banderas, was born on September 24, 1996. Following Two Much, Griffith starred in the neo-noir Mulholland Falls (1996), playing the wife of a Los Angeles police detective (played by Nick Nolte), a performance that won her the Golden Raspberry Award for Worst Supporting Actress. Critics such as Roger Ebert praised the film as "the kind of movie where every note is put in lovingly. It's a 1950s crime movie, but with a modern, ironic edge," but the film was a box office flop.

Griffith was cast in the role of Charlotte Haze in Adrian Lyne's 1997 adaptation of Lolita, opposite Jeremy Irons. The film received a brief theatrical run and was subsequently shown on television, and grossed only $1.1 million against a $62 million budget. Caryn James of The New York Times noted that Griffith was "ideally cast as the annoying, widowed Charlotte. With her garish red nails, her screeching voice, her affected diction, Charlotte seems unbearable to the professorial Humbert." In 1998, Griffith had a supporting part playing a famous actress in Woody Allen's Celebrity (1998), a performance characterized by critic Peter Travers as "playfully lusty". She followed this with a starring role as a free-spirited heroin addict in Larry Clark's independent film Another Day in Paradise, opposite James Woods. Roger Ebert praised the performances, writing: "Woods and Griffith play types they've played before, but with a zest and style that brings the movie alive--especially in the earlier scenes, before everything gets clouded by doom."

On February 5, 1999, Griffith made her stage debut at the Old Vic in London, England, where she acted with Cate Blanchett in The Vagina Monologues. That same year, she starred in Crazy in Alabama, a film directed by Banderas and produced by Green Moon Productions, the company that she and Banderas formed together. In the film, Griffith played an eccentric woman in 1965 Alabama who allegedly kills her husband and attempts to hide the remains while traveling to Hollywood. The plot is set against a subplot involving a race-related murder. Rita Kempley of The Washington Post wrote that "Griffith manages to make Barbra Streisand look downright camera-shy," but criticized its dual plots, writing that the "juxtapositions are not merely preposterous, but downright tasteless. Worse yet, they unintentionally trivialize the civil rights movement by aligning it with a ding-dong belle's tenuous connection with the women's movement." This sentiment was echoed by Paul Clinton of CNN, who wrote: "The deadly serious Alabama plot line of Crazy in Alabama is much more interesting than Griffith's wacky, comic cross-country trip. These dueling stories result in a film that's oddly uneven and unlikely to generate big box-office numbers." This was followed by a role in the HBO television film RKO 281, in which Griffith portrayed 1920s and 1930s movie star Marion Davies. For her performance, she received an Emmy Award nomination for Outstanding Supporting Actress in a Limited Series or Movie.

In 1999, Griffith was cast as Honey Whitlock, an arrogant actress kidnapped by a gang of underground filmmakers, in John Waters's black comedy Cecil B. Demented. Speaking on her being cast, Waters commented that Griffith possessed "a combination of a good sense of humor and a little bit of defiance. Like me, she's someone with a past who has made peace with it. Nobody can blackmail her. So she's happy." Peter Travers of Rolling Stone wrote of that while the film's jokes are "hit-and-miss," Griffith "has a ball tweaking her diva image". Also in 2000, Griffith acted opposite Patrick Swayze in Forever Lulu, in which she portrayed a schizophrenic woman attempting to contact her son. Derek Elley of Variety panned the film, referring to it as "a straight-to-vidbin stiff... this wannabe romantic comedy is chock full of phony sentiment."

In November 2000, Griffith returned to drug rehabilitation for treatment of a painkiller addiction. While in treatment, Griffith began making public blog posts in an online journal detailing her battle to beat her substance abuse. She wrote in her first post: "I am starting this recovery journal because I wanted to share with you my experiences. I am still a little shaky, but I feel it is important that I share this with you, because an addiction to prescribed pain pills can happen to anyone, and you have to be careful." Griffith had a minor role in the 2001-released youth-oriented independent film Tart, which she co-produced with Banderas under their Green Moon Productions company. The film starred Griffith's former Lolita co-star Dominique Swain, as well as Brad Renfro, Bijou Phillips, and Mischa Barton. In 2002, she voiced Margalo the bird in the film Stuart Little 2.

=== 2003–2012: Theater and television ===
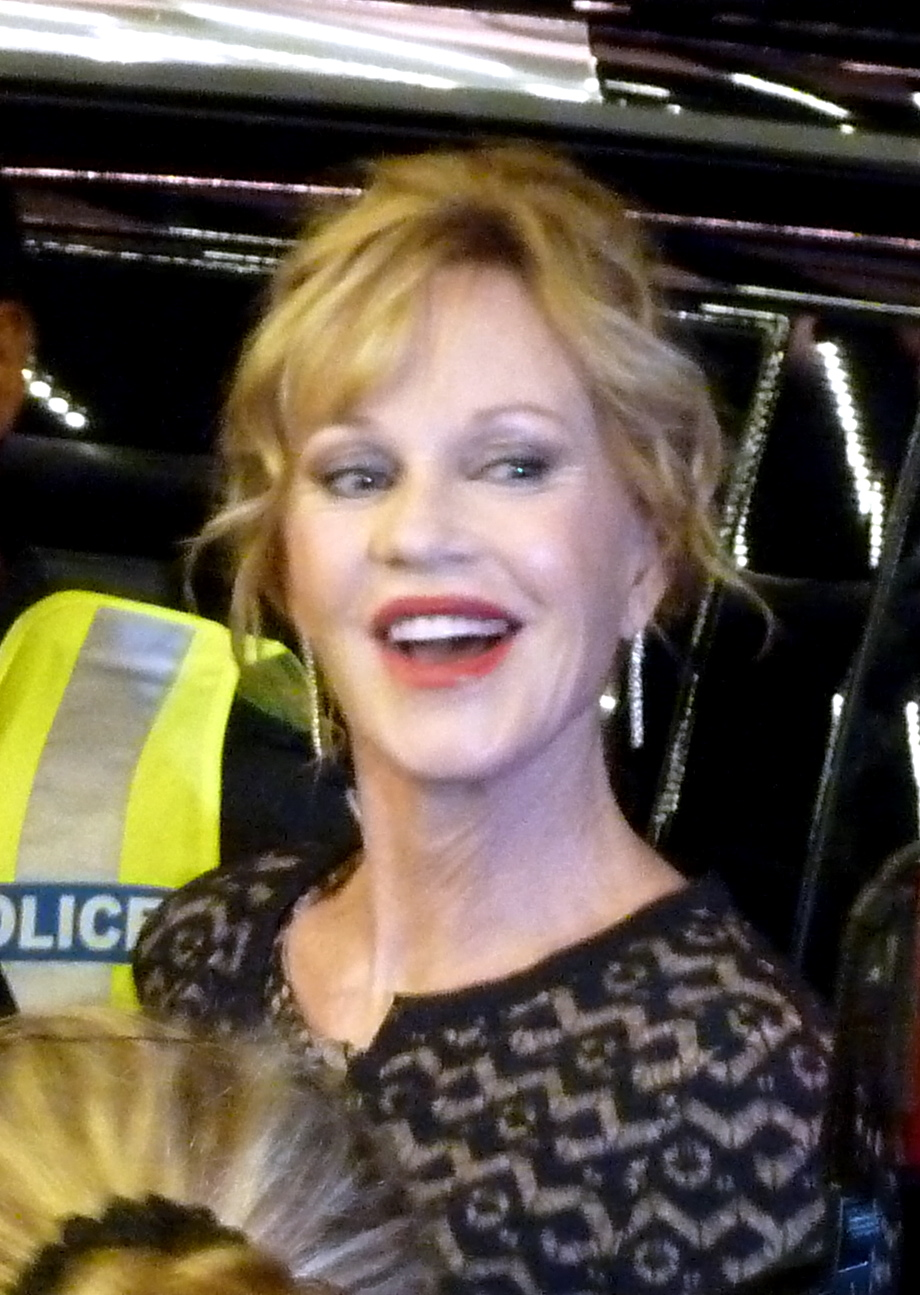
Griffith at the 2011 Toronto International Film Festival

In August 2003, Griffith made her Broadway debut playing Roxie Hart in a run of the musical Chicago. The run was a box-office success. Though Griffith was previously untrained in song and dance, she still impressed New York Times theater critic Ben Brantley, who wrote: "Ms. Griffith is a sensational Roxie, possibly the most convincing I have seen" and "[the] vultures who were expecting to see Ms. Griffith stumble...will have to look elsewhere." Charles Isherwood of Variety noted some weaknesses in Griffith's performance, such as her singing and dancing abilities, but conceded:

These undeniable weaknesses ultimately are overridden, at least for this veteran of at least a half-dozen Chicago casts, by Griffith's fresh and thoroughly endearing take on the role. From the show's opening moments, when Roxie looks on with a sullen, confused pout as her lover prepares to hightail it out of her unsatisfactory life, Griffith infuses her perf with a natural vulnerability that gives her Roxie a refreshing authenticity. The contours of the character fit Griffith's screen persona like a lace glove: Inside this Roxie, a knowing woman playing the little girl lost, is a real little girl lost.

She returned to the stage in 2012 in a play written by Scott Caan, titled No Way Around but Through, in which she played his mother. She played Caan's mother again during 2014–16 in a recurring role on his television show Hawaii Five-0. In 2016, she filmed with Caan's father James Caan and Jon Voight in a TV movie titled J.L. Ranch.

Prior to Hawaii Five-0, Griffith's television work included the short-lived WB sitcom Twins (2005–06), and the 2007 series Viva Laughlin, which was canceled after two episodes.

In August 2009, Griffith returned to rehabilitation again for what her publicist called "part of a routine plan". She had a three-month stay. In December of that year, Griffith had surgery to remove skin cancer.

Her 2012 television pilot, This American Housewife (produced by Banderas), was not picked up by Lifetime. In the interim, Griffith guest-starred on Nip/Tuck and Hot in Cleveland.

=== 2013–present: Return to film ===
In June 2014, Griffith and Banderas released a statement announcing their intention to divorce "in a loving and friendly manner". According to the petition filed in the Los Angeles Superior Court, the couple had "irreconcilable differences" that led to the divorce. In December 2015, their divorce was finalized. Banderas has stated that he will always love Griffith, and Griffith appeared alongside Banderas in the 2014 science-fiction film Autómata, which they filmed amid their divorce proceedings. She then had a role in Day Out of Days (2015), directed by Zoe Cassavetes. In 2016, she signed to be a guest star on Hulu's The Path.

In 2017, Griffith costarred opposite Al Pacino and Evan Peters in The Pirates of Somalia (originally titled Where the White Man Runs Away), a biopic about journalist Jay Bahadur; and played Jean Shelton in James Franco's The Disaster Artist, a comedy based on Greg Sestero's book of the same name. In mid-2018, Griffith played Mrs. Robinson in a stage version of The Graduate at the Laguna Playhouse in California. In August 2018, she revealed she had undergone further and "final" surgical treatments to remove skin cancer from her face.

== Philanthropy ==
Griffith supports the efforts of Children's Hospital Los Angeles helping to lead Walk for Kids, a community 5K, to raise funds as part of the hospital's community awareness efforts in support of the opening of a new state-of-the-art pediatric inpatient facility. She also participated in the hospital's 2012 Noche de Niños gala as a presenter of a Courage to Care Award.

== Filmography ==
=== Film ===
Year	Film	Role	Notes
1969	Smith!	Extra	Uncredited
1973	The Harrad Experiment	Extra	Uncredited
1975	Night Moves	Delly Grastner	
1975	The Drowning Pool	Schuyler Devereaux	
1975	Smile	Karen Love	
1977	The Garden	Young Girl	
1977	One on One	The Hitchhiker	
1977	Joyride	Susie	
1981	Roar	Melanie	
1981	Underground Aces	Lucy	
1984	Fear City	Loretta	
1984	Body Double	Holly Body	
1986	Something Wild	Audrey 'Lulu' Hankel	
1988	Cherry 2000	Edith 'E' Johnson	
1988	The Milagro Beanfield War	Flossie Devine	
1988	Stormy Monday	Kate	
1988	Working Girl	Tess McGill	
1990	In the Spirit	Hadley	
1990	Pacific Heights	Patty Palmer	
1990	The Bonfire of the Vanities	Maria Ruskin	
1991	Paradise	Lily Reed	
1992	Shining Through	Linda Voss	
1992	A Stranger Among Us	Emily Eden	
1993	Born Yesterday	Billie Dawn	
1994	Milk Money	Eve "V"	
1994	Nobody's Fool	Toby Roebuck	
1995	Now and Then	Tina 'Teeny' Tercell	
1995	Two Much	Betty Kerner	
1996	Mulholland Falls	Katherine Hoover	
1997	Lolita	Charlotte Haze	
1998	Shadow of Doubt	Kitt Devereux	
1998	Celebrity	Nicole Oliver	
1998	Another Day in Paradise	Sid	
1999	Crazy in Alabama	Lucille Vinson	
2000	Cecil B. Demented	Honey Whitlock	
2001	Tart	Diane Milford	
2002	Searching for Debra Winger	Herself	Documentary film
2002	Stuart Little 2	Margalo the Bird (voice)	
2003	The Night We Called It a Day	Barbara Marx	
2003	Shade	Eve	
2003	Tempo	Sarah James	
2010	A Turtle's Tale: Sammy's Adventures	Snow (voice)	
2012	Yellow	Patsy	
2012	Dino Time	Tyra (voice)	
2013	Dark Tourist	Betsy	
2014	Autómata	Susan Dupré	
2014	Thirst	Sue	Short film
2015	Day Out of Days	Kathy	
2017	The Disaster Artist	Jean Shelton	
2017	The Pirates of Somalia	Maria Bahadur	
2020	The High Note	Tess Sherwoode	
2025	By Design	Narrator (voice)	

=== Television ===
Year	Title	Role	Notes
1978	Starsky & Hutch	Julie McDermott	Episode: "The Action"
1978	The Hardy Boys/Nancy Drew Mysteries	Stacey Blain	Episode: "The House on Possessed Hill"
1978	Carter Country	Tracy Quinn	2 episodes
1979	Vega$	Dawn Peters	Episode: "Red Handed"
1985	Alfred Hitchcock Presents	Girl	Episode: "Pilot"
1987	Miami Vice	Christine von Marburg	Episode: "By Hooker by Crook"
2005–06	Twins	Lee Arnold	Series regular
2006	Robot Chicken	Hermione Granger / Love-a-Lot Bear / Bashful Heart Bear (voices)	Episode: "Password: Swordfish"
2007	Viva Laughlin	Bunny Baxter	Series regular
2010	Nip/Tuck	Brandie Henry	Episode: "Sheila Carlton"
2011	Hot in Cleveland	Melanie Griffith	Episode: "Sisterhood of the Traveling SPANX"
2012	Raising Hope	Tamara	2 episodes
2012	DTLA	Kimberley	2 episodes
2014–16	Hawaii Five-0	Clara Williams	4 episodes
2017	The Path	Jackie	Episode: "Return"
2019	SMILF	Enid	Episode: "Sex Makes It Less Formal"
2023	The Kardashians	Herself	Episode: "Deeper Than Dolce"

==== TV films and miniseries ====
Year	Title	Role	Notes
1976	Once an Eagle	Jinny Massengale	
1978	Daddy, I Don't Like it Like This	Girl in Hotel	
1978	Steel Cowboy	Johnnie	
1981	The Star Maker	Dawn Barnett Youngblood	
1981	She's in the Army Now	Pvt. Sylvie Knoll	
1981	Golden Gate	Karen	
1990	Women & Men: Stories of Seduction	Lureen	
1995	Buffalo Girls	Dora DuFran	
1998	Me & George		Failed pilot
1999	RKO 281	Marion Davies	
2000	Along for the Ride	Lulu McAfee	
2005	Heartless	Miranda Wells	
2012	This American Housewife	Leila Swift	Failed pilot
2013	Call Me Crazy: A Five Film	Kristin	Segment: "Maggie"
2015	The Brainy Bunch	Grandmother	Failed pilot
2016	J.L. Family Ranch	Laura Lee Schafer	

== Stage credits ==
Year	Title	Role	Venue	Notes
2003	Chicago	Roxie Hart	Ambassador Theatre, New York City	Replacement
2012	No Way Around But Through	Lulu	The Falcon Theatre, Burbank	
2018	The Graduate	Mrs. Robinson	Laguna Playhouse, Laguna Beach	

== Awards and nominations ==
Institution	Year	Category	Work	Result
Academy Awards	1989	Best Actress	Working Girl	Nominated
American Comedy Awards	1989	Funniest Actress in a Motion Picture (Leading Role)	Working Girl	Nominated
Australian Film Institute Awards	2003	Best Supporting Actress in Film	The Night We Called It a Day	Nominated
Boston Society Film Critics	1989	Best Actress	Working Girl	Won
British Academy Film Awards	1990	Best Actress in a Leading Role	Working Girl	Nominated
Cannes Film Festival	2001	Festival Trophy (Homage)	—N/a	Won
Golden Globe Awards	1985	Best Supporting Actress – Motion Picture	Body Double	Nominated
Golden Globe Awards	1987	Best Actress in a Motion Picture – Musical or Comedy	Something Wild	Nominated
Golden Globe Awards	1989	Best Actress in a Motion Picture – Musical or Comedy	Working Girl	Won
Golden Globe Awards	1996	Best Supporting Actress – Series, Miniseries or Television Film	Buffalo Girls	Nominated
Golden Globe Awards	2000	Best Supporting Actress – Series, Miniseries or Television Film	RKO 281	Nominated
Golden Raspberry Awards	1991	Worst Actress	The Bonfire of the Vanities	Nominated
Golden Raspberry Awards	1993	Worst Actress	Shining Through	Won
Golden Raspberry Awards	1993	Worst Actress	A Stranger Among Us	Won
Golden Raspberry Awards	1994	Worst Actress	Born Yesterday	Nominated
Golden Raspberry Awards	1997	Worst Actress	Two Much	Nominated
Golden Raspberry Awards	1997	Worst Supporting Actress	Mulholland Falls	Won
Golden Raspberry Awards	2000	Worst Actress	Crazy in Alabama	Nominated
Golden Raspberry Awards	2001	Worst Actress	Cecil B. Demented	Nominated
Goldene Kamera	1992	Best International Actress	Shining Through	Won
Jupiter Awards	1990	Best International Actress	Working Girl	Nominated
Primetime Emmy Awards	2000	Outstanding Supporting Actress in a Miniseries or a Movie	RKO 281	Nominated
Sant Jordi Awards	2000	Best Foreign Actress	Crazy in Alabama	Won
Sant Jordi Awards	2000	Best Foreign Actress	Another Day in Paradise	Won
Taormina Film Fest	2000	Taormina Arte Award	—N/a	Won

== Sources ==
- Conrad, Dean (2018). Space Sirens, Scientists and Princesses: The Portrayal of Women in Science Fiction Cinema. Jefferson, North Carolina: McFarland. ISBN 978-1-476-66927-4.
- Hammer, Tad Bentley (1991). International Film Prizes: An Encyclopedia. New York: Garland. ISBN 978-0-824-07099-1.
- Hedren, Tippi (2016). Tippi: A Memoir. New York: William Morrow. ISBN 978-0-062-46903-8.
- Hosoda, Craig (1996). The Bare Facts Video Guide 1997. Bare Facts. ISBN 978-0-962-54747-8.
- Parish, James Robert (2002). Hollywood Divas: The Good, the Bad, and the Fabulous. Contemporary Books. ISBN 978-0-071-40819-6.
- Quinn, Phyllis; Russell, Sue; Holt, Georgia (1988). Star Mothers: The Moms Behind the Celebrities. New York: Simon and Schuster. ISBN 0-671-64510-2.
- Rich, Nathaniel (2005). San Francisco Noir: The City in Film Noir from 1940 to the Present. New York: The New York Review of Books. ISBN 978-1-892-14530-7.
- Weldon, Michael (1996). The Psychotronic Video Guide To Film. New York: Macmillan. ISBN 978-0-312-13149-4.
