= Shambala Preserve =

Animal sanctuary near Acton, California, United States

- Interactive map of Shambala Preserve
- 34.440301°N 118.252394°W
- Date opened: 1972
- Location: Acton, California, United States
- No. of animals: 65-70
- Website: www.shambala.org

Shambala Preserve is an animal sanctuary established in 1972 and located in Acton, California, a desert community 10 miles (16 km) southwest of Palmdale, off of California State Route 14 and 40 miles (64 km) north of Los Angeles. Shambala is maintained by the Roar Foundation which was founded by actress Tippi Hedren in 1983.

== Animals ==
Shambala cares for endangered exotic big cats such as African lions, Siberian tigers and Bengal tigers, leopards, servals, mountain lions, bobcats, plus a lynx, a Florida panther, and a liger. Shambala is accredited by the American Sanctuary Association.

Most of the animals at Shambala were born in captivity, orphans, are no longer wanted at circuses or zoos, or are given up by private owners who could no longer care for them. For example, Shambala became the new home for Michael Jackson’s two Bengal tigers, Sabu and Thriller, after he decided to close his zoo at his Neverland Valley Ranch in Los Olivos, California.

The animals have not been raised by their own species in nature, and are not adapted to life in the wild, therefore they are human-dependent for their needs. Shambala provides expert veterinarians for care. Carefully planned diets are supplied by Natural Balance Pet Foods.

Shambala Preserve was also home to a pair of African bush elephants (Loxodonta a. africana) named Timbo and Kura; despite Asian elephants (Elaphus maximus) being far more commonly tamed and trained, Timbo had nonetheless starred in Hedren’s and her husband’s film Roar, as well as a documentary known as "The Elephant Man" (known also as "Tusks and Tattoos"), in which the elephant's relationship with his caretaker, Chris Gallucci, was explored. Timbo, one of the largest bull elephants ever recorded in captivity, was brought to the preserve in 1972, and died of natural causes at age 48 in 2005. Kura, meanwhile, died in 2000 at the age of 41.

== Staff ==
The current president is Tippi Hedren and vice-president is Stephen Shultz. Advisory board members have included: Loni Anderson, Melanie Griffith (Tippi Hedren's daughter), Lily Tomlin, Steve Valentine, Donald Spoto, and Betty White. Veterinarians include: Jon J. Bernstein, DVM; Gay Naditch, DVM; and Chris Cauble, DVM. While Shambala welcomes all volunteers, none work directly with the animals.
