= Free Samples =

2012 film by Jay Gammill

- Release poster
- Directed by: Jay Gammill
- Written by: Jim Beggarly
- Produced by: Joseph McKelheer; Eben Kostbar
- Starring: Jess Weixler; Halley Feiffer; Jesse Eisenberg; Keir O'Donnell; Jocelin Donahue; Whitney Able; Jason Ritter; Tippi Hedren
- Cinematography: Reed Morano
- Edited by: Franklin Peterson; Jay Gammill
- Music by: Eric Elbogen
- Production company: Film Harvest
- Distributed by: Starz Distribution
- Release dates: April 20, 2012 (Tribeca); May 21, 2013 (United States)
- Running time: 79 minutes
- Country: United States
- Language: English

Free Samples is a 2012 American comedy-drama film starring Jess Weixler, Halley Feiffer, Jesse Eisenberg, Jason Ritter, and Tippi Hedren. It was the first film directed by Jay Gammill and the first film written by Jim Beggarly.

== Plot ==
Jillian, a Stanford Law School dropout rebelling by opting out of the family business, wakes up after a night of drinking with no recollection and is tasked with giving out free samples from an ice cream vendor truck.

== Cast ==
- Jess Weixler as Jillian
- Jesse Eisenberg as Tex/Albert
- Jason Ritter as Wally
- Halley Feiffer as Nancy
- Tippi Hedren as Betty
- Keir O'Donnell as Danny
- Jocelin Donahue as Paula
- Whitney Able as Dana

== Release ==
Free Samples had its world premiere at the Tribeca Film Festival on April 20, 2012. The film was released in the United States on video on demand on May 21, 2013, and in select theaters on May 31.
