= Satan's Harvest =

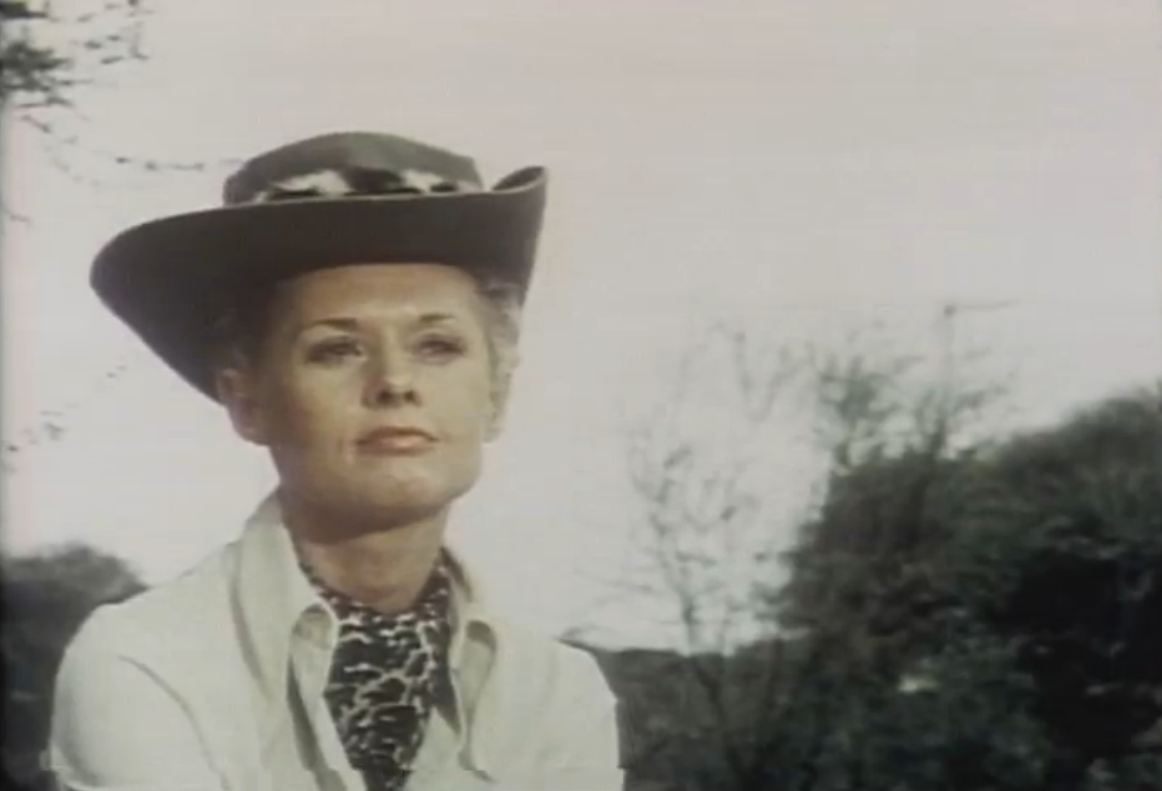
- Tippi Hedren in film
- Directed by: George Montgomery
- Written by: George Montgomery
- Produced by: Hyman Kirstein
- Starring: George Montgomery; Tippi Hedren; Matt Monro; Davy Kaye
- Cinematography: Roderick Stewart
- Edited by: Harry Hughes
- Music by: Roy Martin
- Distributed by: Killarney Films
- Release date: June 4, 1970
- Running time: 88 minutes
- Country: South Africa
- Language: English

Satan's Harvest is a 1970 South African thriller/adventure film directed by George Montgomery who also starred along with Tippi Hedren and singer Matt Monro.

== Plot ==
After inheriting a farm in South Africa, Cutter Murdock, an American private detective, travels there to claim his inheritance and almost immediately finds himself in danger. Follows an attempted assassination while leaving the plane at Jan Smuts Airport (the person behind him is shot dead) and a further attempt on his life when his chauffeur and car are blown in an explosion.

Members of an interloper family excluded from Murdock's uncle's will want Murdock's farm as it is a heroin and marijuana "goldmine".

== Cast ==
- George Montgomery as Cutter Murdock
- Tippi Hedren as Marla Oaks
- Matt Monro as Bates
- Davy Kaye as Trigger
- Brian O'Shaughnessy as Andrew
- Roland Robinson as Timothy
- Tromp Terreblanche as Uncle Craig
- Ian Yule as Jonas/Jake
- Simon Sabela as Foreman

== Soundtrack ==
"Two People" composed by Don Black & Denis King, sung by Matt Monro. Other music in the film is by Roy Martin.

== Production ==
The film was shot on location in Johannesburg and Zimbabwe in 1969.

Tippi Hedren started The Roar Foundation after working on the film.

== Reception ==
The film has been described as "a surprisingly good jungleflick", a "dreary film about drug trafficking in Africa", and a "forgettable film" by Cosmopolitan, while Leonard Maltin sums up his assessment of the film as follows: "Colourful scenery, tepid story."
