= Tiger by the Tail (1970 film) =

1968 film by R. G. Springsteen

- Theatrical release poster
- Directed by: R. G. Springsteen
- Written by: Charles A. Wallace
- Produced by: Francis D. Lyon
- Starring: Christopher George; Tippi Hedren; Dean Jagger; John Dehner; Charo; Lloyd Bochner; Glenda Farrell
- Cinematography: Alan Stensvold
- Edited by: Terry O. Morse
- Music by: Joe Greene
- Production company: United Pictures Corporation
- Distributed by: Commonwealth United Entertainment
- Release date: January 1970
- Running time: 99 minutes
- Country: United States
- Language: English

Tiger by the Tail is a 1970 American drama film directed by R. G. Springsteen, written by Charles A. Wallace, and starring Christopher George, Tippi Hedren, Dean Jagger, John Dehner, Charo, Lloyd Bochner and Glenda Farrell. Shot in 1968, the film was released in January 1970, by Commonwealth United Entertainment.

== Plot ==
Vietnam war hero, accused of murdering his brother, recruits his socialite girlfriend to hunt for the real killer.

== Cast ==
- Christopher George as Steve Michaelis
- Tippi Hedren as Rita Armstrong
- Dean Jagger as Top Polk
- John Dehner as Sheriff Chancey Jones
- Charo as Darlita
- Lloyd Bochner as Del Ware
- Glenda Farrell as Sarah Harvey
- Alan Hale Jr. as Billy Jack Whitehorn
- Skip Homeier as Deputy Sheriff Laswell
- R. G. Armstrong as Ben Holmes
- Dennis Patrick as Frank Michaelis
- Martin Ashe as Jimmy-San Ricketts
- Frank Babich as Reporter
- Marilyn Devin as Julie Foster
- Ray Martell as Garcia
- Burt Mustin as Tom Dugger
- Fernando Pereira as Mendoza
- Olga Velez as Candita
