= Davy Kaye =

English comedy actor and entertainer (1916–1998)

Davy Kaye MBE
- Davy Kaye as Jean in Those Magnificent Men in Their Flying Machines (1965)
- Born: David Kodeish; March 25, 1916; Mile End, London, England
- Died: February 3, 1998; Paradise Island, Bahamas
- Occupations: Comedy actor, entertainer
- Years active: 1935–1990s
- Children: Kaplan Kaye; Melody Kaye

Davy Kaye MBE (born David Kodeish, 25 March 1916 – 3 February 1998) was a British comedy actor and entertainer.

== Early life ==
Born in Mile End Road in the East End of London to Jewish parents Koppel and Dora Kodeish, Kaye was so small at birth that he was not expected to live. As a schoolboy, he appeared in amateur revues and shows at his school, making his professional debut at the Mile End Empire in 1935. On the outbreak of the Second World War, Kaye tried to join up, but was turned down due to his short stature, later telling the story that the medical officer had said, "When we declare war on pygmies - we'll send for you." Instead, he spent the war years entertaining troops at RAF bases, munitions factories and Army camps, as well as on BBC radio where he was a regular with such shows as Midday Music Hall and Variety Bandbox.

Following the war, the 4' 11" tall Kaye toured in his own revues with his then agent Joe Collins, the father of Jackie and Joan Collins in a partnership which lasted for more than thirty years. He played Benny Southstreet in the original 1953 London production of Guys and Dolls at the London Coliseum, and played five different characters in the 1961 Wolf Mankowitz musical Belle (based on the case of Dr Crippen) at the Strand Theatre.

== Career ==
From 1954 to 1968 Kaye presented a new show each month at London's Embassy Club, and also starred in Androcles and the Lion and The Bishop's Bonfire at the Mermaid Theatre. He appeared in many films including The Wrong Arm of the Law (1963), Crooks in Cloisters (1964), Those Magnificent Men in Their Flying Machines (1965), Carry On Cowboy (1965), Chitty Chitty Bang Bang (1968), Carry On at Your Convenience (1971) and Alice's Adventures in Wonderland (1972). On television he appeared in Sapphire and Steel and as Natty Dan in the TV Series Young Sherlock: The Mystery of the Manor House (1982). He also appeared in pantomime. Kaye's last British television appearance was on the Barrymore Show where he performed his famous One Man Band act.

A brash man who was said to be difficult to work with, he nevertheless was rarely out of work and on two occasions the Variety Club of Great Britain gave a lunch in his honour at the Dorchester Hotel in 1985 and 1995 to celebrate his 50th and 60th year in show business respectively, both of which were televised on the BBC. Noted for his charity work, over the years Kaye raised more than one million pounds for a number of charities, including the Bud Flanagan Leukaemia Fund, The Duke of Edinburgh's Award Scheme, the Prince Philip Trust Fund, the Nightingale House home for elderly Jews and the Ealing Jewish Youth Club.

He was a Past King Rat of the Grand Order of Water Rats (1984), and later was Preceptor. Kaye was awarded the Badge of Merit and Bar, the highest honour that the Order can award.

Kaye was awarded the MBE in Her Majesty The Queen's 1995 New Year Honours for his services to charity.

He is the father of entertainers Kaplan Kaye and Melody Kaye.

He died in 1998 in Paradise Island in the Bahamas.

== Selected filmography ==
- Fun at St. Fanny's (1955) - Ferdy
- The Millionairess (1960) - Tommy True (uncredited)
- The Pot Carriers (1962) - Mouse
- The Wrong Arm of the Law (1963) - Trainer King
- The World Ten Times Over (1963) - Compère
- Crooks in Cloisters (1964) - Specs
- Those Magnificent Men in Their Flying Machines (1965) - Jean
- Carry On Cowboy (1965) - Josh the Undertaker
- The Biggest Bundle of Them All (1968) - Davey Collins
- Chitty Chitty Bang Bang (1968) - Admiral
- Satan's Harvest (1970) - Trigger
- The Magnificent Seven Deadly Sins (1971) - Guest Appearance (segment "Sloth")
- Carry On at Your Convenience (1971) - Benny
- Alice's Adventures in Wonderland (1972) - Mouse
- A Nightingale Sang in Berkeley Square (1979) - Sid the Yid
