= Peter James Cooper =

American film producer

Peter James Sanguesa Cooper is a film producer and businessman.

== Entertainment ==
Peter James Cooper produced the independent romantic comedy film, Love and Mary, starring Lauren German and Gabriel Mann. The film was written and directed for the screen by Elizabeth Harrison, and filmed throughout the Houston area. Love and Mary premiered at the South by Southwest film festival in Austin, Texas on March 11, 2007. It was also featured at the Hollywood Film Festival on October 19, 2007.

He is also the executive producer of the independent feature film This Is What Remains, written and directed by Ben Wagner. This Is What Remains is a psychological thriller produced by 3:41am Productions. The film has been acquired by Millennium Entertainment for U.S. domestic distribution.

== Superhawk Films ==
In 2022, Cooper launched Texas-based Superhawk Films to produce motion pictures and television shows. The company's first feature film is Crossroads directed by British filmmaker Andy Delaney, and written and produced by Cooper. The film stars Hannah James, Eric Nelsen, Jack Falahee, Jake Thomas and Will Brittain, and was completed in 2024. Formerly known as Holly By Nightfall, Crossroads was an official selection of the 2024 Dallas International Film Festival. Distributed in the United States by Vertical Entertainment, Crossroads had a theatrical release on March 28, 2025. It's currently streaming on Apple and Amazon Prime. Superhawk Films next feature film production is Rio Frio, a modern day western produced by Peter James Cooper.

== Crave Cupcakes ==
Cooper is the co-founder of Crave Cupcakes, launched in Houston on June 16, 2008. Crave Cupcakes is a gourmet cupcake bakery designed by the design firm AvroKO of New York City. Cooper created the Crave brand name and the vintage mixer logo identity, as well as having a hand in the overall design of the bakery concept.

== Bernardo Footwear ==
In 2011, Cooper launched Bernardo Group and acquired the Bernardo footwear brand, designer and makers of the iconic Bernardo Sandals. Cooper engaged in an important re-branding of Bernardo, creating the brand identity and loop logo used on Bernardo shoes today. Cooper also successfully created the Bernardo 1946 brand which re-introduced Italian-made heritage styles from the 1950s and 1960s. In 2014, the company was sold to a private investor group.
