= Love and Mary =

- Theatrical Poster
- Directed by: Elizabeth Harrison
- Written by: Elizabeth Harrison
- Produced by: Peter James Cooper; Jonathan Downs
- Starring: Lauren German; Gabriel Mann; Allie DeBerry; Whitney Able
- Cinematography: Brad Rushing
- Edited by: George Folsey, Jr.
- Music by: Tony Tisdale
- Production companies: Industrial Pictures; Ranch House Productions
- Distributed by: Cut Entertainment Group
- Release date: March 11, 2007
- Running time: 104 minutes
- Country: United States
- Language: English
- Budget: $500,000 (estimated)

Love and Mary is a 2007 American romantic comedy film written and directed by Elizabeth Harrison and starring Lauren German and Gabriel Mann. The film was produced by Elizabeth Harrison, Peter James Cooper and Jonathan Downs.

== Plot ==
Mary Wilson, a born and bred Texan, moves to Los Angeles to open a high class bakery, and get away from her wacky family. After initial success she faces eviction when a bad review and a run of poor sales coincide. Hoping to raise money from engagement presents she decides to visit her family in Texas with her fiancé, Brent. Brent comes down with an allergy before the trip and she takes his twin brother Jake, a jailbird, to pretend to be Brent. While in Texas she falls in love with Jake, and he with her, despite some competition from Lucy, her childhood friend, who is in on the secret and assumes Jake is "available". Brent arrives during the engagement party and take Mary back to Los Angeles, where Mary's bakery becomes a success after her grandfather gives her the award-winning recipes he and his wife collected over the years. While setting a wedding date, Brent realizes they are not suited, Mary confesses her love to Jake, and Mary and Jake get married.

== Cast ==
- Lauren German as Mary
- Gabriel Mann as Jake / Brent
- Whitney Able as Lucy
- Allie DeBerry as Sara Pedersen

== Release ==
Love and Mary premiered on March 11, 2007, at the South by Southwest film festival in Austin, Texas while the DVD followed on August 11, 2008. The film was also featured at the Hollywood Film Festival on October 19, 2007.

== Reception ==
Love and Mary received mostly mixed reviews with a 66% 'fresh' rating on Rotten Tomatoes.
