= Nick Basile =

American film director

Nick Basile (born February 10, 1978) is an American film director, producer, actor, and screenwriter. Films produced and directed by Basile include The Adventures of Captain Steel, Slasher Flick (featured on the NYC Horror Film Festival DVD), the futuristic thriller Beyond Dreams, and the award-winning thriller/modern-day western The Man Who Knew Belle Starr. January 8, 2008 saw the DVD release of Basile's full-length documentary American Carny: True Tales from the Circus Sideshow, released by Cinema Epoch & Koch Entertainment. American Carny made its television debut on October 19, 2009, on the Documentary Channel. Basile's next project is the psychological thriller DARK. The movie is set in New York City during the 2003 blackout. It stars Whitney Able, Alexandra Breckenridge, Brendan Sexton III, Michael Eklund, and the rapper Redman. The movie is produced by Minerva Pictures in association with Renfield Productions. Gremlins director Joe Dante serves as Executive Producer. The film held its world premiere at the 22nd Annual Oldenburg International Film Festival.

His acting credits include roles in the Off-Broadway production of Tony n' Tina's Wedding, H.P. Lovecraft (LoveCracked! The Movie), and he has appeared in Shakespeare's Much Ado About Nothing at the Gene Frankel Theatre in NYC. Basile also appeared in the Barry Levinson film The Bay.

== Awards ==
- 2001: Best Director for a short subject, 2001 Atlantic City Film Festival, The Man Who Knew Belle Starr (based on the short story by author Richard Bausch)
