= Tippi Hedren =

American actress (born 1930)

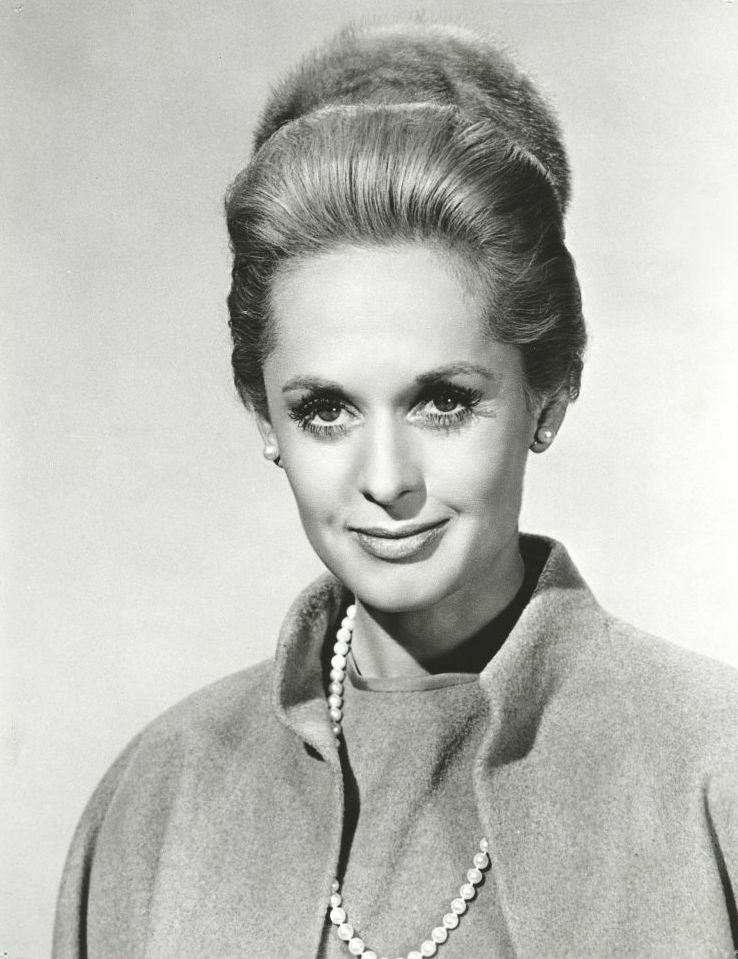
- Hedren in 1964
- Born: Nathalie Kay Hedren; January 19, 1930 (age 96); New Ulm, Minnesota, U.S.
- Occupations: Actress; model; animal rights activist
- Years active: 1950–2018
- Spouses: Peter Griffith (m. 1952; div. 1960); Noel Marshall (m. 1964; div. 1982); Luis Barrenechea (m. 1985; div. 1992)
- Children: Melanie Griffith
- Relatives: Dakota Johnson (granddaughter)

Nathalie Kay "Tippi" Hedren (born January 19, 1930) is an American former actress. Initially a fashion model, appearing on the front covers of Life and Glamour magazines (among others), she became an actress after being discovered by director Alfred Hitchcock while appearing on a television commercial in 1961. Hedren received worldwide recognition due to her work in two of his films, the suspense-thriller The Birds (1963) (for which she won a Golden Globe Award for New Star of the Year) and the psychological drama Marnie (1964). She performed in over 80 films and television shows, including Charlie Chaplin's final film A Countess from Hong Kong (1967), the political satire Citizen Ruth (1996), and the existential comedy I Heart Huckabees (2004). Among other honors, her contributions to world cinema have been recognized with the Jules Verne Award and a star on the Hollywood Walk of Fame.

Hedren's strong commitment to animal rescue began in 1969 while she was shooting two films in Africa and was introduced to the plight of African lions. In an attempt to raise awareness for wildlife, she spent over a decade bringing Roar (1981) to the screen. She started her own nonprofit organization, the Roar Foundation, in 1983; it supports the Shambala Preserve, an 80-acre (32 ha) wildlife habitat in Acton, California, that enables her to continue her work in the care and preservation of lions and tigers. Hedren has also set up relief programs worldwide following earthquakes, hurricanes, famine and war. She was also instrumental in the development of Vietnamese-American nail salons.

== Early life ==
Nathalie Kay Hedren was born in New Ulm, Minnesota, on January 19, 1930, and lived in nearby Lafayette until age 5. Her family then moved to Morningside, a neighborhood in Edina, Minnesota, where she lived until she was 17 and modeled for the midwest department store chain Dayton's. For much of her career, her year of birth was misreported as 1935. In a 2004 A&E Biography, Hedren acknowledged that she was born in 1930, which is consistent with the birth registration index at the Minnesota Historical Society. Her paternal grandparents were Swedish immigrants, while her mother was of German and Norwegian descent.

Hedren was educated at Morningside School, and at West High School in Minneapolis.

== Career ==
=== 1950–1960: Modeling ===
On reaching her 20th birthday, Hedren bought a ticket to New York City, where she joined the Eileen Ford Agency. Within a year, she made her unofficial film debut as "Miss Ice Box" in the musical comedy The Petty Girl. In interviews, she referred to The Birds, her first credited role, as her first film. Although she received several film offers during that time, Hedren had no interest in acting, as she knew it was very difficult to succeed.

Hedren had a highly successful modeling career during the 1950s and early 1960s, appearing on the covers of Life, The Saturday Evening Post, McCall's, and Glamour, among others. In 1961, after seven years of marriage to the actor Peter Griffith, Hedren divorced and returned to California with her daughter, Melanie, and rented an expensive home in Sherman Oaks. She later said, "I thought I could continue my career as it had been in New York. I thought everything would be just fine, and it wasn't. So I thought, 'well, I don't type, what shall I do?'"

=== 1961–1966: Transition to acting and Alfred Hitchcock ===
==== Discovery (1961) ====
On October 13, 1961, Hedren received a call from an agent who told her a producer was interested in working with her. When she was told it was Alfred Hitchcock, who – while watching The Today Show – had seen her in a commercial for a diet drink called Sego, she agreed to sign a seven-year contract. During their first meeting, the two talked about everything except the role for which he was considering her. Hedren was convinced for several weeks it was for his television series, Alfred Hitchcock Presents.

Hedren being an unknown actress with little training, Hitchcock put her through an extensive color screen test that lasted two days and cost $25,000, doing scenes from his previous films, such as Rebecca, Notorious, and To Catch a Thief with actor Martin Balsam. According to Balsam, Hedren was very nervous, but studied every line, did every move she was asked to, and tried to do everything right. Hitchcock asked costume designer Edith Head to design clothes for Hedren's private life and he personally advised her about wine and food. He also insisted for publicity purposes that her name should be printed only in single quotes, 'Tippi'. The press mostly ignored this directive from the director, who felt that the single quotes added distinction and mystery to her name. Hitchcock was impressed with Hedren. As production designer Robert F. Boyle explained, "Hitch always liked women who behaved like well-bred ladies. Tippi generated that quality."

Afterward, Hedren was invited to lunch with Hitchcock, his wife, Alma, and Lew Wasserman, head of Universal, at one of Hitchcock's favorite restaurants, Chasen's. There, she was presented with a golden pin of three birds in flight, adorned by three tiny seed pearls, and was asked by Hitchcock to play the leading role in his upcoming film The Birds. "I was so stunned. It never occurred to me that I would be given a leading role in a major motion picture. I had great big tears in my eyes," Hedren later recalled.

==== The Birds (1963) ====
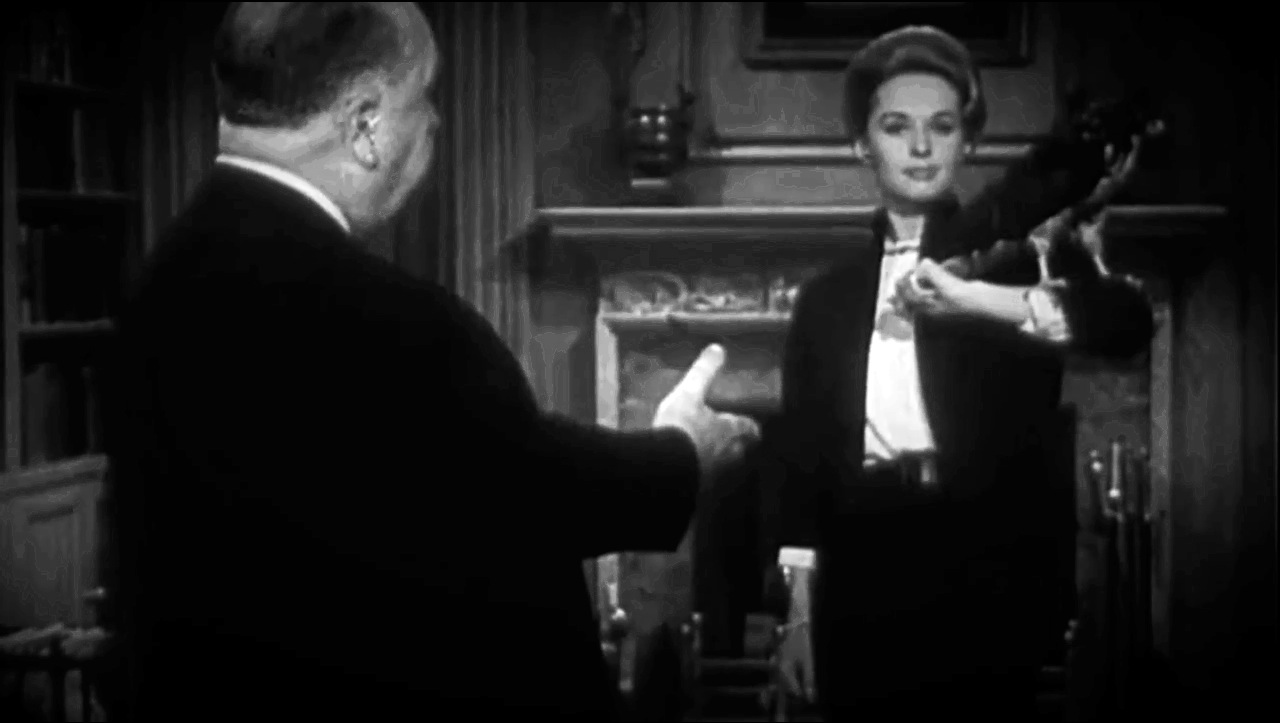
Hedren with Alfred Hitchcock in a trailer for The Birds (1963)

The Birds (1963) was Hedren's screen debut. Hitchcock became her drama coach, and gave her an education in film-making, as she attended many of the production meetings such as script, music, or photography conferences. Hedren said, "I probably learned in three years what it would have taken me 15 years to learn otherwise." She learned how to break down a script, to become another character, and to study the relationship of different characters. Hedren portrayed her role of Melanie Daniels as Hitchcock requested. She said, "He gives his actors very little leeway. He'll listen, but he has a very definite plan in mind as to how he wants his characters to act. With me, it was understandable, because I was not an actress of stature. I welcomed his guidance."

During the six months of principal photography, Hedren's schedule was tight, as she was only given one afternoon off a week. At first, she found the shooting "wonderful". Hitchcock told a reporter, after a few weeks of filming, that she was remarkable, and said, "She's already reaching the lows and highs of terror." Nonetheless, Hedren recalled the week she did the final bird attack scene in a second-floor bedroom as the worst of her life.

Before filming it, she asked Hitchcock about her character's motivations to go upstairs, and his response was, "Because I tell you to." She was then assured that the crew would use mechanical birds. Instead, Hedren endured five solid days of prop men, protected by thick leather gloves, flinging dozens of live gulls, ravens, and crows at her, their beaks clamped shut with elastic bands. In a state of exhaustion, when one of the birds gouged her cheek and narrowly missed her eye, Hedren sat down on the set and began crying. A physician ordered a week's rest. Hitchcock protested, according to Hedren, saying she was the only one left to film. The doctor's reply was, "Are you trying to kill her?" She said the week also appeared to be an ordeal for the director.

Universal's executives, who did not back Hitchcock's decision to hire Hedren in the first place, were impressed with her performance and Wasserman described it as "remarkable". While promoting The Birds, Hitchcock was full of praise for his new protégée, and compared her to Grace Kelly. "Tippi has a faster tempo, city glibness, more humor [than Grace Kelly]. She displayed jaunty assuredness, pertness, an attractive throw of the head, and she memorized and read lines extraordinarily well and is sharper in expression." The film was screened out of competition in May at a prestigious invitational showing at the 1963 Cannes Film Festival.

Hedren's performance was praised in Variety's review: "Aside from the birds, the film belongs to Hedren, who makes an auspicious screen bow. She virtually has to carry the picture alone for the first 45-minute stretch, prior to the advent of the first wave of organized attackers from the sky. Miss Hedren has a star quality and Hitchcock has provided her with a potent vehicle to launch her career." Hedren received the Golden Globe Award for New Star of the Year at the 21st Golden Globe Awards, tied with Elke Sommer for The Prize and Ursula Andress for Dr. No. Her role as Melanie Daniels was named by Premiere as one of the greatest film characters of all time.

==== Marnie (1964) ====
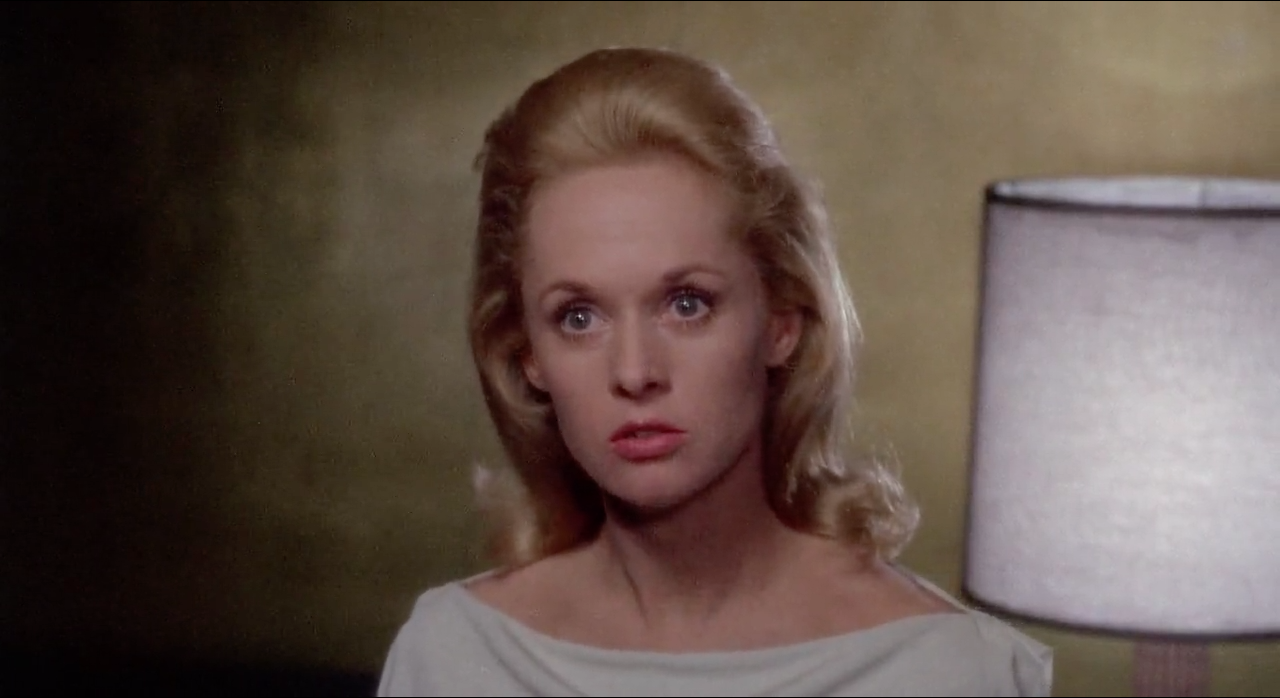
Hedren in Marnie (1964)

Hitchcock was so impressed with Hedren's acting abilities, he decided to offer her the leading role in his next film, Marnie (1964), a romantic drama and psychological thriller from the novel by Winston Graham, during the filming of The Birds. Hedren was stunned and felt extremely fortunate to be offered to play "such a complicated, sad, tragic woman", and later said, "I consider my acting, while not necessarily being method acting, but one that draws upon my own feelings. I thought Marnie was an extremely interesting role to play and a once-in-a-lifetime opportunity." She voiced doubts about her ability to play the demanding role, but Hitchcock assured her she could do it. As opposed to The Birds, where she had received little acting guidance, for this film Hedren studied every scene with Hitchcock.

Hedren recalled Marnie as her favorite of the two films she did with Hitchcock for the challenge of playing Marnie Edgar, an emotionally battered young woman who travels from city to city assuming various guises to rob her employers. During the filming, Hitchcock was quoted as saying about Hedren, "an Academy Award performance is in the making." On release, the film was greeted by mixed reviews and indifferent box-office returns, and received no Oscar nominations. Variety wrote, "Hedren returns in a particularly demanding role. Miss Hedren, undertaking a role originally offered Grace Kelly for a resumption of her screen career, lends credence to a part never sympathetic. It's a difficult assignment which she fulfills satisfactorily."

Hedren later said that Marnie was "ahead of its time" because "people didn't talk about childhood and its effects on adult life. It was taboo to discuss sexuality and psychology and to put all that into a film was shocking." Despite its original lukewarm reception, the film was later acclaimed and described as a "masterpiece" and Hedren's performance is now regarded as one of the finest in any Hitchcock film. Richard Brody of The New Yorker wrote in his 2016 review of the film "Hedren's performance is one of the greatest in the history of cinema."

==== Allegations of sexual harassment ====
Marnie was the second and last collaboration between Hedren and Hitchcock. In 1973, she admitted that a major lifestyle difference caused a split in their relationship. "He was too possessive and too demanding. I cannot be possessed by anyone. But, then, that's my own hangup." In 1983, author Donald Spoto published his second book about Hitchcock, The Dark Side of Genius, for which Hedren agreed to talk for the first time in detail about her relationship with the director. The book was controversial, as several of Hitchcock's friends claimed the Hitchcock portrayed in the book was not the man they knew. For years after its release, Hedren was not keen to talk about it in interviews, but thought the chapter devoted to her story was "accurate as to just what he was". Hedren later explained her long silence before telling her story, "It was embarrassing and insulting—there were a lot of reasons why I didn't want to tell the story. I didn't want it to be taken advantage of, twisted, turned, and made into an even uglier situation than it was."

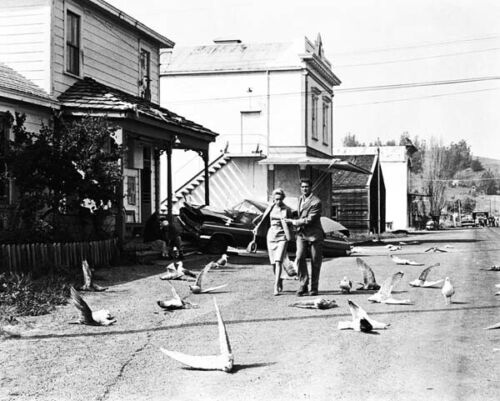
Hedren with Rod Taylor in The Birds (1963)

According to Spoto's book, Hitchcock brought in two members of his crew during the filming of The Birds and asked them to keep careful watch on the activities of Hedren, "when she left the set—where she went, who she visited, how she spent her free time". He then advised her on what she should eat, whom she should see, and how she should live. He told the cast and crew they were not allowed to talk to her. Hedren's co-star in The Birds, Rod Taylor, later remembered, "Hitch was becoming very domineering and covetous of 'Tippi', and it was very difficult for her. No one was permitted to come physically close to her during the production. 'Don't touch the girl after I call "Cut!"' he said to me repeatedly."

Hitchcock also attempted, on one occasion, to grab and violently kiss Hedren in the back of a car as they drove onto the set. Hedren told his assistant, Peggy Robertson, and the studio chief, Lew Wasserman, that she was becoming very unhappy about the whole situation. "But he was Alfred Hitchcock, the great and famous director, and I was Tippi Hedren, an inexperienced actress who had no clout." She decided she could not quit her contract because she was afraid to be blacklisted and unable to find work. Hedren's own daughter, Melanie Griffith, remembered that while Hedren was doing The Birds, she thought Hitchcock was taking her mother away from her. "Suddenly, I wasn't allowed even to visit my mom at the studio."

During the filming of Marnie, Hedren found Hitchcock's behavior toward her increasingly difficult to bear as filming progressed. "Everyone – I mean everyone – knew he was obsessed with me. He always wanted a glass of wine or champagne, with me alone, at the end of the day. He was really isolating me from everyone." Hedren's co-star in Marnie, Diane Baker, later recalled, "She was never allowed to gather around with the rest of us, and he demanded that every conversation between her and Hitch be held in private... Nothing could have been more horrible for me than to arrive on that movie set and to see her being treated the way she was."

Hitchcock revealed to Hedren one day he had a recurring dream where she came up to him and said, "Hitch, I love you – I'll always love you." When she heard this, Hedren replied "But it was a dream. Just a dream," and excused herself from his presence. She believed Hitchcock had no consideration for her feelings and remembered she was humiliated after he asked her to touch him, just before shooting a scene. "He made sure no one else could hear, and his tone and glance made it clear exactly what he meant." Hedren asked Hitchcock's permission one day to travel to New York to appear on The Tonight Show, where she was supposed to be presented an award as the "Most Promising New Star". Hitchcock refused, according to his biographer, because he claimed the break would affect her performance. During that meeting, he apparently "made an overt sexual proposition" that Hedren "could neither ignore nor answer casually, as she could his previous gestures".

In Spoto's third book about Hitchcock, Spellbound by Beauty (2008), Hedren revealed that Hitchcock actually made offensive demands on her. "He stared at me and simply said, as if it was the most natural thing in the world, that from this time on, he expected me to make myself sexually available and accessible to him – however and whenever and wherever he wanted." Hitchcock's demands led to a "horrible, horrible fight", according to Hedren. "He made these demands on me, and no way could I acquiesce to them."

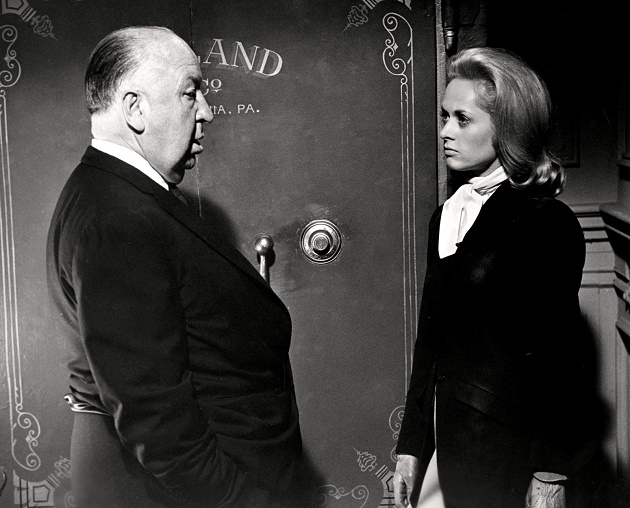
Hedren with Alfred Hitchcock in a publicity photograph for Marnie (1964)

Hedren then told Hitchcock Marnie would be their last film together and later recalled how Hitchcock told her he would destroy her career. "I said I wanted to get out of my contract. He said: 'You can't. You have your daughter to support, and your parents are getting older.' I said: 'Nobody would want me to be in this situation, I want to get out.' And he said: 'I'll ruin your career.' I said: 'Do what you have to do.' And he did ruin my career. He kept me under contract, paid me to do nothing for close on two years." Hedren felt so humiliated, she called the director a "fat pig" in front of people on the set.

Hitchcock made only a comment about it to his biographer, John Russell Taylor: "She did what no one is permitted to do. She referred to my weight." The two communicated only through a third party for the rest of the film. According to Marnie's screenwriter, Jay Presson Allen, Hitchcock was "mad" for Hedren. She felt unhappy for both and described the situation as "an old man's cri de coeur", adding that Hitchcock had a "Pygmalion complex about Tippi". She advised Hedren to finish the film and then get on with her life and be happy. Hedren's hairdresser, Virginia Darcy, even told Hitchcock he should not be possessive with Hedren. "Tippi felt rightly that she was not his property, but he'd say, 'You are, I have a contract.'"

Although Hitchcock thought he might mend fences with Hedren and make another film with her, she refused to reconsider her decision. Hedren's contract terms gave Hitchcock the final say as to any work she could take on and he used that power to turn down several film roles on her behalf. She was particularly disappointed when French director François Truffaut told her he had wanted her for one of them. In 1966, Hitchcock sold her contract to Universal Studios after Hedren appeared in two of their TV shows, Kraft Suspense Theatre (1965) and Run for Your Life (id.). The studio ultimately released her from her contract after she refused to appear on a television Western for them.

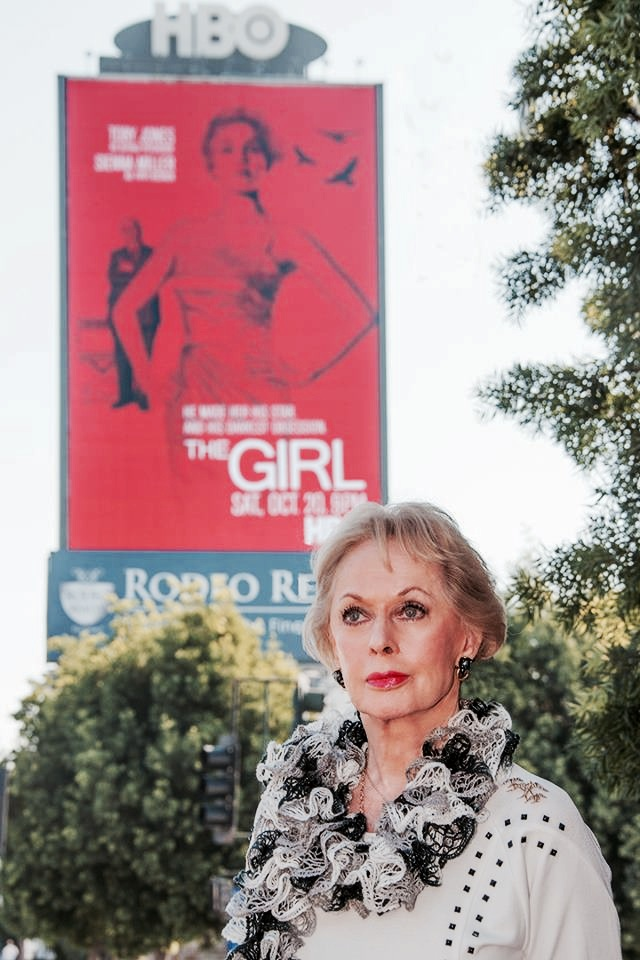
Hedren in front of The Girl's poster in 2012

In 2012, The Girl, an HBO/BBC film about Hedren and Hitchcock's relationship, based on Donald Spoto's 2008 book Spellbound by Beauty: Alfred Hitchcock and His Leading Ladies, was released. When she was first told about the project, Hedren said she had mixed feelings about it, "To be still alive and have a film made about you is an awesome and incredibly frightening experience." Hedren and Hitchcock were respectively portrayed by Sienna Miller and Toby Jones. Although she was thrilled with the choice of Miller, Hedren was worried she would not be portrayed "as strong a character as I was – and still am. I had to be extremely strong to fight off Mr. Hitchcock." She described the moment she saw the film as "probably one of the most involved, emotionally tense 90 minutes that I have ever lived".

Upon the film's release, Hedren said although she believed the film accurately portrays Hitchcock's behavior towards her, the time constraints of a 90-minute film prevented telling the entire story of her career with him. "It wasn't a constant barrage of harassment. If it had been constantly the way we have had to do it in this film, I would have been long gone." She recalled there were times she described as "absolutely delightful and wonderful", and insisted that "Hitchcock had a charm about him. He was very funny at times. He was incredibly brilliant in his field." The film was controversial, as others who knew and worked with Hitchcock responded to it negatively.

Kim Novak, who worked on Hitchcock's Vertigo (1958), disputed Hitchcock's portrayal as a sexual predator in The Girl: "I never saw him make a pass at anybody or act strange to anybody. And wouldn't you think if he was that way, I would've seen it or at least seen him with somebody? I think it's unfortunate when someone's no longer around and can't defend themselves." Novak previously described Hitchcock as a gentleman, and when asked about reports of his behavior, she said, "Maybe I just wasn't his type." Novak also stated, "I won't dispute Tippi if that's what she saw."

Hedren herself was asked why her account of sexual harassment contrasted with the many interviews she gave about her time with Hitchcock, her presence at the AFI Life Achievement Award ceremony honoring him in 1979, and her presence at his funeral. She explained that, "He ruined my career, but he didn't ruin my life. That time of my life was over. I still admire the man for who he was." She also said, "I've been able to separate the two. The man who was the artist. I mean, what he gave to the motion picture industry can never be taken away from him and I certainly wouldn't want to try. But on the other side, there is that dark side that was really awful."

The relationship between Hedren and Hitchcock was the basis for John Logan's play Double Feature with Joanna Vanderham playing Hedren and Ian McNeice playing Hitchcock. It opened at the Hampstead Theatre in London in February 2024.

=== Career setbacks (1967–1973) ===
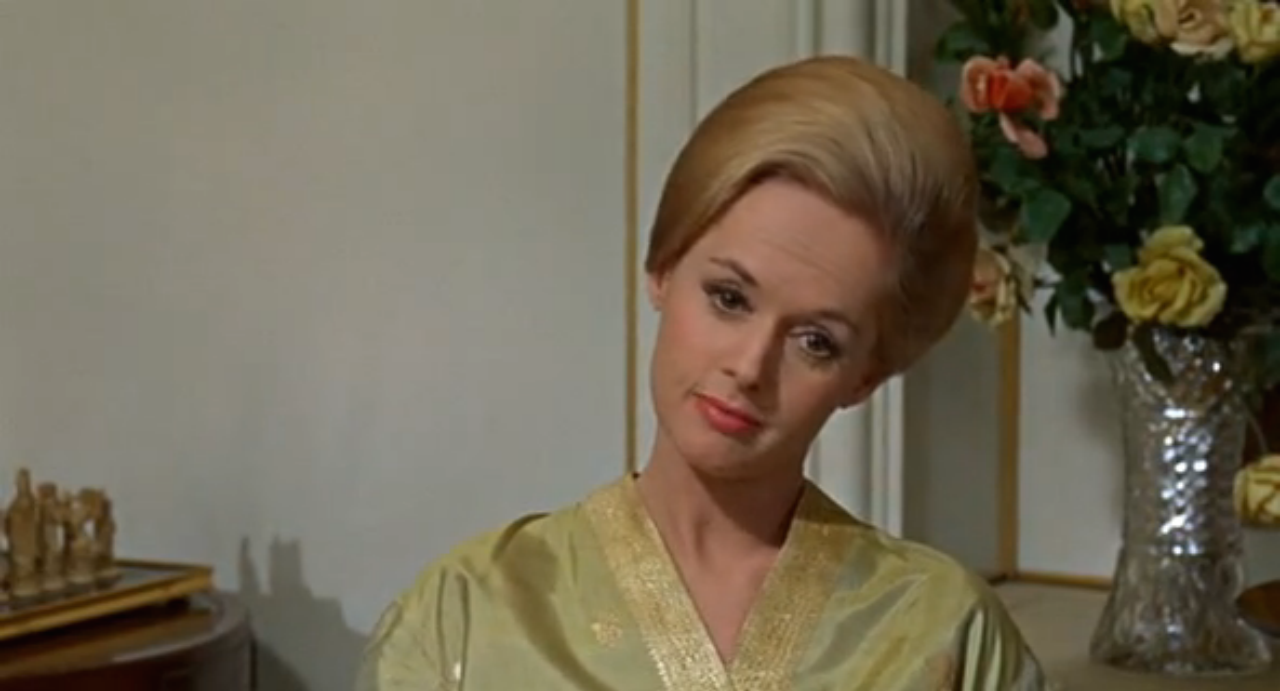
Hedren in A Countess from Hong Kong (1967)

Hedren's first feature film appearance after Marnie was in the 1967 film A Countess from Hong Kong, starring Marlon Brando and Sophia Loren. She was told by writer-director Charlie Chaplin that he was offering her a major supporting role as Ogden Mears (Brando)'s estranged wife Martha but had to accept the role without reading the script. When she arrived in England, where the filming took place, she received the script and realized that her part was little more than a cameo. She asked Chaplin why he had lied to her. "Every actor in the world was asking if they could do this film, to just do a walk-on, without even being paid for it. When I said, 'Why didn't you just tell me that it was a cameo? I would have done this film anyway?' He said, 'I didn't think you would come,' which was very sweet. He was a very clever man."

Hedren asked Chaplin to expand the role, and although he tried to accommodate her, he could not, as the story mostly takes place on a ship, which Hedren's character boards near the end of the film. In the end, she remained in the film and later said that it was both amusing and strange to work with Chaplin. She found him to be a very serious man and loved his approach to directing. She later said, "I wish someone would have been allowed to do a documentary. The way he directed was unlike anyone I ever saw. He acted out all the parts himself. He did Sophia's part, then Marlon's part, then mine, and then he'd say, 'Okay, now you can do it.' Which would be impossible, to mimic the master. It was incredible. None of us believed it. Marlon hated it."

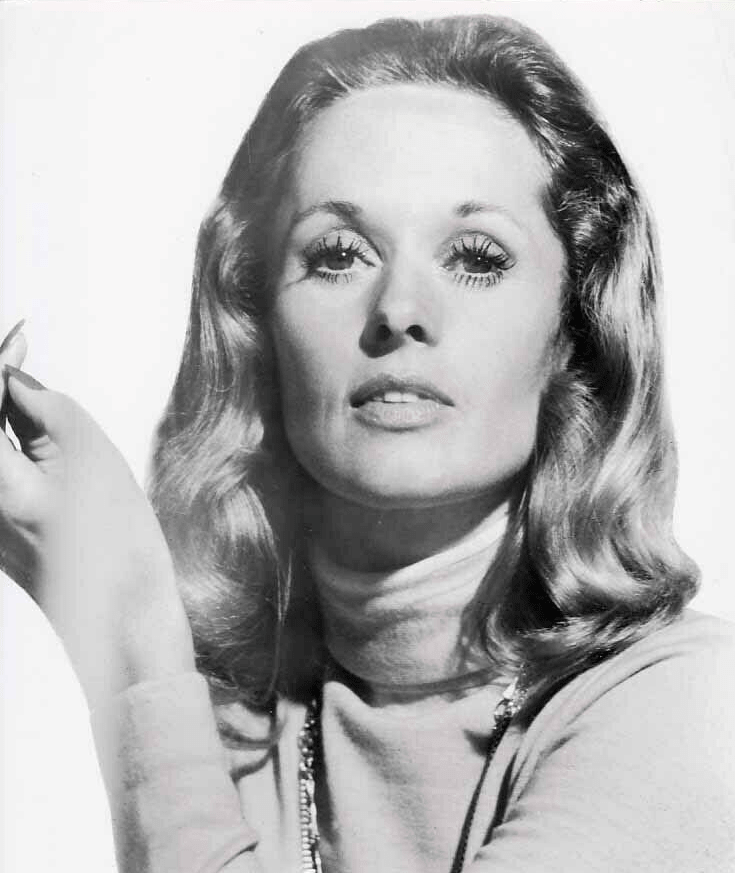
Hedren in The Harrad Experiment (1973)

After the release of A Countess from Hong Kong, Hedren's career was described as "spectacular" by the press. She told a reporter at the time, "I don't want to wait myself out of this business, but working for Hitch and Charlie has been very special to me, and now I'm going to wait for something special to come along." In 1968, she signed on to do the American Civil War drama Five Against Kansas with Farley Granger and Jeffrey Hunter, but the project was never realized.

In 1968, Hedren returned to film as Rita Armstrong, a socialite who helps her boyfriend Steve Michaelis (George Armstrong) catch a killer, in Tiger by the Tail. From 1970 to 1971, she guest-starred twice on The Courtship of Eddie's Father. She agreed to take part in Satan's Harvest (1970) and Mister Kingstreet's War (1973)—which were shot back-to-back despite the discrepancy in their release dates—for the sole reason that they were being filmed in Africa.

In 1973, Hedren played Margaret Tenhausen, a teacher at an experimental sex school in The Harrad Experiment, which starred James Whitmore and Don Johnson—the latter who would later marry her daughter, Melanie Griffith. Hedren felt that the film "deals with vital themes—themes like the decline in importance of ideas like possession and jealousy and, by inference, marriage. I have four teenaged children and I think this picture says some valuable things to them." She confessed at the time that she was occasionally depressed because she was not doing any major films, and told a magazine, "My husband just cancelled all the trade magazines because he felt I should cut off the source of my discontent. He's the type who won't stand for sustained down feelings."

=== Roar (1974–1981) ===
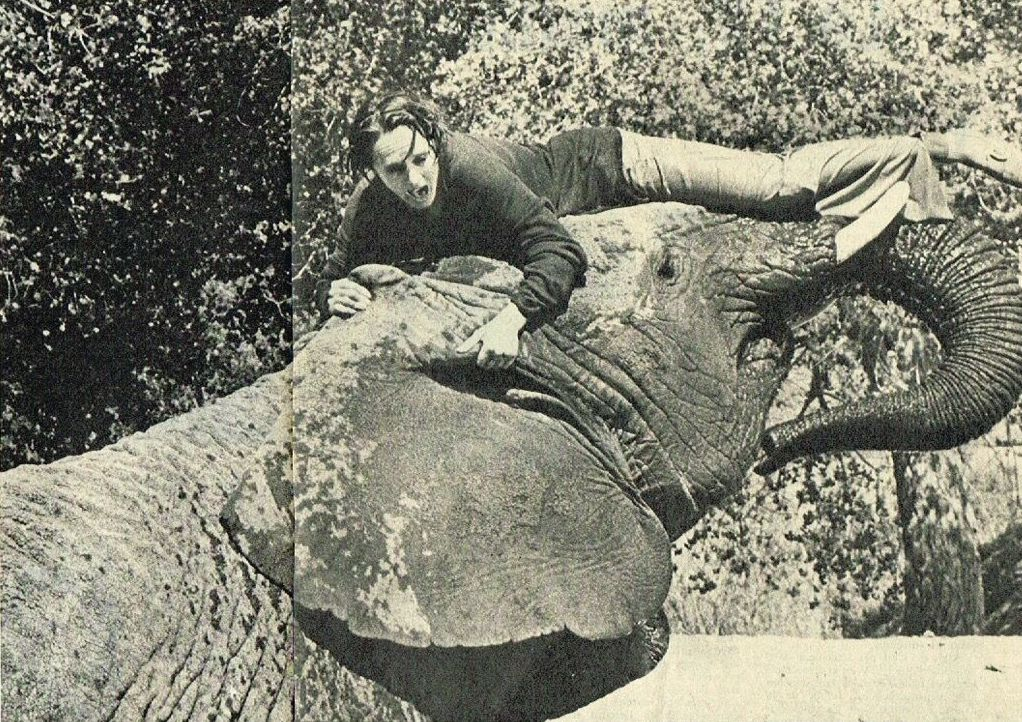
Hedren in a 1977 photograph. During the filming of Roar, she had her ankle fractured by Tembo, an African elephant, when he used his trunk to pick her up. She contracted gangrene from the incident.

Hedren and husband Noel Marshall watched a pride of lions move into a house after a game warden moved out in 1969, during the filming of Satan's Harvest in Africa. She said, "We were delighted with the way they adapted themselves to living there. And they were so funny we knew we had an idea for a picture." Marshall wrote a script titled Lions, Lions and More Lions based on their experience; it was retitled Roar and centered on a family's misadventures in a research park filled with lions, tigers, and other wild cats.

Hedren played the lead role and co-starred with her daughter Melanie, husband Marshall, and his own sons Jerry and John. They attempted to rent Hollywood animals for a nine-month shoot, but upon approaching animal trainers for support, they were discouraged and nobody would rent them 30 or 40 lions, as the script required, because of their natural tendency to fight. They were encouraged to start collecting and training their own exotic beasts. Animal trainer Ron Oxley told them, "to get to know about lions, you've got to live with them for a while".

They started to raise a lion cub named Neil in their Sherman Oaks house and made sure that the animal slept in their bed. Life photographer Michael Rougier documented their life in 1971 and photographed the lion with the whole family inside and outside the house, from Hedren's daughter Melanie's bed to the living room to the swimming pool. After complaints from their neighbors, Hedren and Marshall bought a ranch outside of Los Angeles in Acton that would serve as the set for Roar. They got permission there to rescue and raise several lions, tigers, African elephants, and other exotic felines.

Filming started in 1974 and took five years just to complete the photography. Every scene involving lions was improvised and shot with four or sometimes eight cameras. More than 100 people worked on the film, as well as more than 150 untrained lions, tigers, leopards, and cheetahs. During production, no animals were hurt, but more than 70 members of the cast and crew were mauled. Hedren fractured a leg and also had scalp wounds when an elephant bucked her off its back while she was riding it. She was also bitten in the neck by a lion and required 38 stitches. This incident can be seen in the film.

Melanie Griffith was also attacked, receiving 50 stitches to her face. It was feared that she would lose an eye, but she recovered and was not disfigured. Marshall was attacked so many times that he eventually was diagnosed with gangrene. In one of those incidents, he was clawed by a cheetah when protecting the animals during a bushfire that occurred in 1979. All animals were evacuated, and several years were needed for him to recover from his injuries.

In 1978, a flood destroyed the film sets and killed three of the lions. The project was set back several years. Hedren said that they were all determined to finish the film: "We were so sure the film was going to be a success that we thought everything (financing the ranch and the lions, etc.) would take care of itself."

Roar was released worldwide in 1981 with the exception of the United States, because according to Hedren, "The United States distributors wanted the lion's share of the profits, and we thought it ought to go to the beautiful animals that made the movie." The film cost $17 million and grossed only $2 million, but it was a turning point in Hedren's life. In 1983, she established the nonprofit The Roar Foundation to take care of the big cats. "After our movie was over," she explained, "it was unconscionable to see the animals go any place else." Roar was re-released in 2015, but Hedren declined to discuss it, as she felt that promotion for the film was filled with "inaccuracies".

=== Later career (1982–present) ===
After Roar, Hedren accepted any low-budget television or cinema role that could help bring funds to her foundation to provide protection, shelter, care, and maintenance for the animals at the Shambala Preserve. In 1982, she co-starred with Leslie Nielsen in Foxfire Light. She appeared in several television series, including Hart to Hart in 1983 and the late-night horror series Tales from the Darkside in 1984. In the 1985 pilot episode of The New Alfred Hitchcock Presents, she made a brief appearance in the segment "Man from the South" as a waitress in a bar who berates a customer, played by her daughter Melanie Griffith. In 1990, she had a nonspeaking, minor part as Florence Peters, a wealthy widow romanced by James Danforth (Michael Keaton) in the film Pacific Heights (1990), which also starred her daughter. That same year, she had a role on The Bold and the Beautiful, a daytime soap opera she said she was "proud to have in my resume".

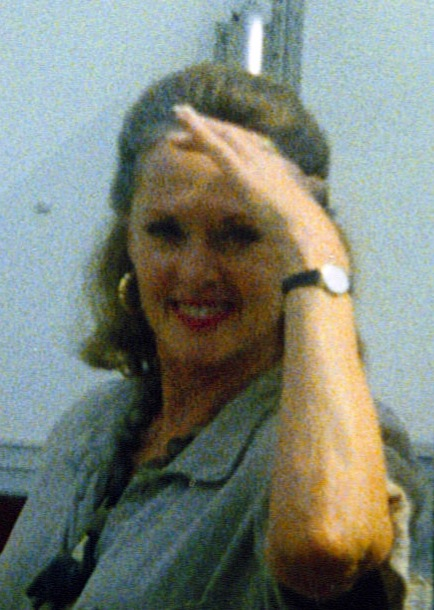
Hedren on the set of The Birds II: Land's End (1994)

In 1994, Hedren appeared in the made-for-cable sequel, The Birds II: Land's End, in a role different from the one she had played in the original. She was, however, disappointed that she did not get a starring role and admitted before the film's release, "I wish that it was more than a cameo. I think they made a mistake by not doing that, but it has helped me to feed my lions and tigers." When asked about what could have been Hitchcock's opinion on the film, she answered: "I'd hate to think what he would say!" However, in a 2007 interview Hedren said of the film: "It's absolutely horrible, it embarrasses me horribly."

From 1994 to 1996, Hedren had a guest-starring role in Dream On. The sitcom gave her "the opportunity to do comedy. I'd never done comedy before and it was just wonderful for me to be able to do that. Everybody just thought of me as a serious actress, so I owe that to John Landis (the executive producer), giving me that opportunity." In 1996, she played Jessica Weiss, an abortion rights activist in Alexander Payne's political satire Citizen Ruth with Laura Dern.

In 1998, she co-starred alongside Billy Zane and Christina Ricci in I Woke Up Early the Day I Died, a film she felt was "incredible". "I must say I really love that film. It was a unique kind of film to do also, because it had no dialogue in it. It was very, very different." That same year, she guest-starred in a special episode titled "Psychodrama" of the television series Chicago Hope, that paid tribute to the Hitchcock films. Hedren's character, Alfreda Perkins, was a reference to Hitchcock and actor Anthony Perkins, who starred in the director's 1960 film Psycho.

After appearing in a number of little-exposed films between 1999 and 2003, Hedren had a small but showy role in the 2004 David O. Russell comedy I Heart Huckabees, as Mary Jane Hutchinson, a foul-mouthed attractive older woman who slaps Brad Stand (Jude Law) in an elevator. She felt that the director, who had a reputation for being difficult, was "totally crazy", but also "very interesting. I was able to work well with him." She also added it was a strange experience as, "... all of a sudden, he'd be like, 'Now I'm going to do it this way,' and you'd think, 'How is he going to edit this? How is this going to work?' But he made it work."

In 2006, Hedren was a cast member of the short-lived primetime soap opera Fashion House with Bo Derek and Morgan Fairchild, and continued to guest-star in television series such as The 4400 (2006) and CSI: Crime Scene Investigation (2008). In 2012, Hedren and her daughter guest-starred together on an episode of Raising Hope. That same year, she appeared in Free Samples, an indie film where she had a supporting role as Betty, an old movie star. In 2013, she made an appearance as herself in the fourth season finale of Cougar Town.

Hedren published her autobiography, Tippi: A Memoir, co-written with Lindsay Harrison, in 2016 through William Morrow and Company, as she felt it was "about time I stop letting everyone else tell my story and finally tell it myself". In 2018, at age 88, Hedren became the new face of Gucci's timepieces and jewelry and starred as a mysterious fortune teller in the brand's commercial ad "The Fortune Teller".

== Influence ==
A Louis Vuitton ad campaign in 2006 paid tribute to Hedren and Hitchcock with a modern-day interpretation of the deserted railway station opening sequence of Marnie. Her look from The Birds (1963) inspired designer Bill Gaytten's designs for John Galliano's pre-fall 2012 collection.

Naomi Watts stated that her character interpretation in Mulholland Drive (2001) was influenced by the look and performances of Hedren in Hitchcock films. Watts and Hedren both appeared in I Heart Huckabees (2004), but did not share any scenes together. Off screen, the film's director David O. Russell introduced them, and Watts said of Hedren: "I was pretty fascinated by her then, because people have often said we're alike." Watts was styled as Hedren's title character from Marnie for a photo shoot for March 2008 issue of Vanity Fair. In the same issue, Jodie Foster was styled as Hedren's character, Melanie Daniels, from The Birds. In 2025, Kim Petras said that Hedren was her style icon.

== Animal rights activism ==
Hedren's strong commitment to animal rescue began in 1969 while she was shooting two films in Africa and was introduced to the plight of African lions. In an attempt to raise awareness for wildlife, she spent over a decade bringing Roar (1981) to the screen. She started her own nonprofit organization, the Roar Foundation, in 1983; it supports the Shambala Preserve, an 80-acre (32 ha) wildlife habitat that enables her to continue her work in the care and preservation of lions and tigers.

=== Shambala Preserve ===
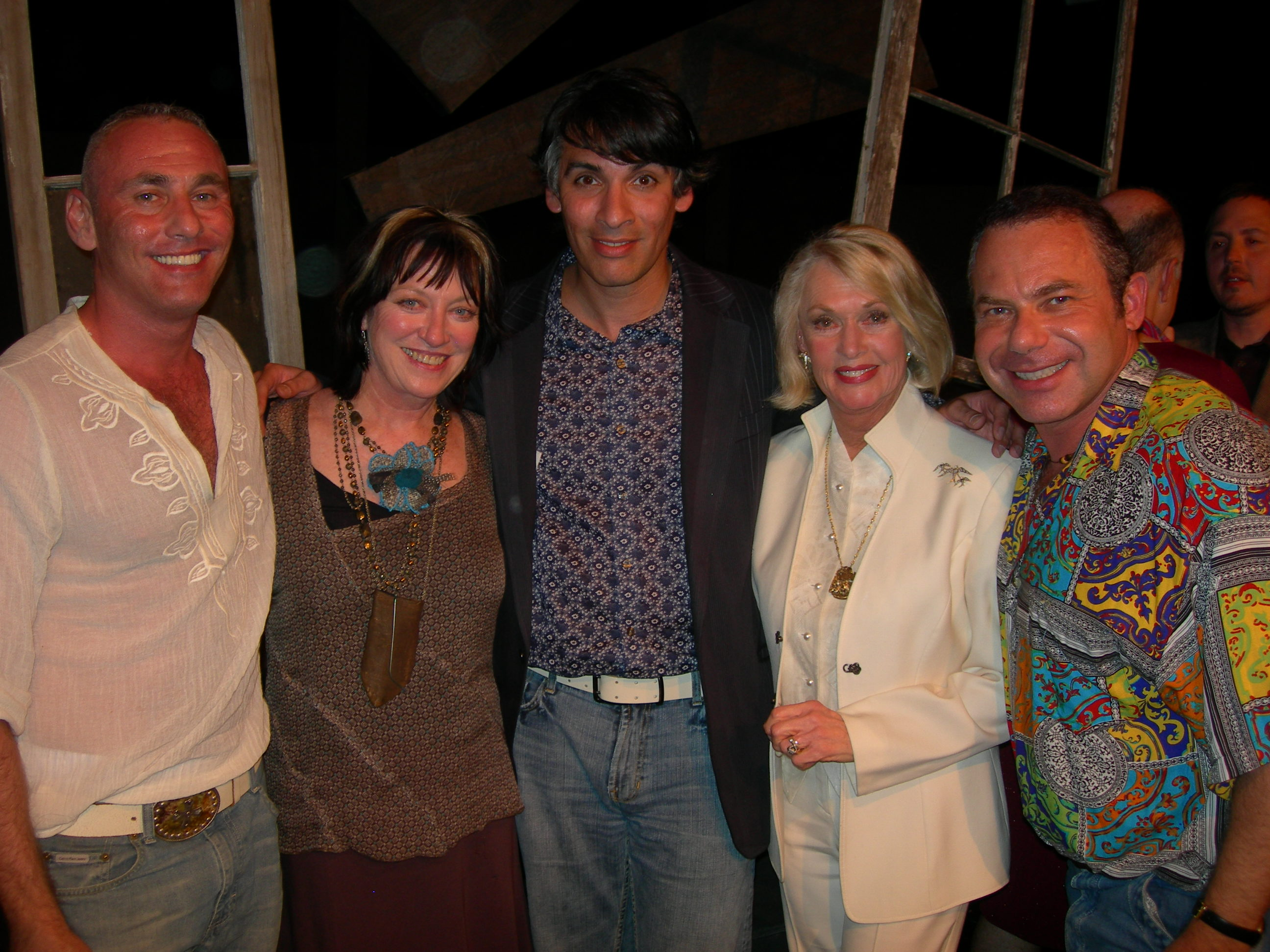
Shambala benefit stage production of The Birds in Hollywood, California: (L–R) Shambala supporter Don Norte, Veronica Cartwright, playwright David Cerda, Tippi Hedren, and Shambala supporter Kevin Norte, 2006

In 1981, Hedren produced Roar, an 11-year project that ended up costing $17 million and starred dozens of African lions. "This was probably one of the most dangerous films that Hollywood has ever seen", remarked the actress. "It's amazing no one was killed." During the production of Roar, Hedren, her husband at the time, Noel Marshall, and daughter Melanie were attacked by lions; Jan de Bont, the director of photography, was scalped.

Hedren later co-wrote Cats of Shambala (1985) about the experience. Roar made only $2 million worldwide. Hedren ended her marriage to Marshall a year later in 1982. The film directly led to the 1983 establishment of the nonprofit The Roar Foundation and Hedren's Shambala Preserve, located at the edge of the Mojave Desert in Acton, California, between the Antelope Valley and the Santa Clarita Valley, 40 miles (64 km) northeast of Los Angeles.

Shambala houses some 70 animals. Hedren lives on the Shambala site and conducts monthly tours of the preserve for the public. In a 2015 interview with magazine Ability, Hedren emphasized that there is no human contact with the animals and that all of the cats are spayed and neutered, since they are being raised in captivity. Hedren was the founding president of the American Sanctuary Association, a post she still holds.

Hedren took in and cared for Togar, a lion that belonged to Anton LaVey, after he was told by San Francisco officials that he could not keep a fully grown lion as a house pet. Shambala became the new home for Michael Jackson's two Bengal tigers, Sabu and Thriller, after he decided to close his zoo at his Neverland Valley Ranch in Los Olivos. Thriller died in June 2012 of lung cancer.

On December 3, 2007, Shambala Preserve made headlines when Chris Orr, a caretaker for the animals, was mauled by a tiger named Alexander. Several documentaries have focused on Shambala Preserve, including the 30-minute Lions: Kings of the Serengeti (1995), narrated by Melanie Griffith, and Animal Planet's Life with Big Cats (1998), which won the Genesis Award for Best Documentary in 1999. The animals at the preserve served as the initial inspiration for the life's work of artist A.E. London, who started her career working for Hedren.

As of 2020, Hedren still maintains more than a dozen lions and tigers. Her granddaughter Dakota Johnson is involved in their care.

== Personal life ==
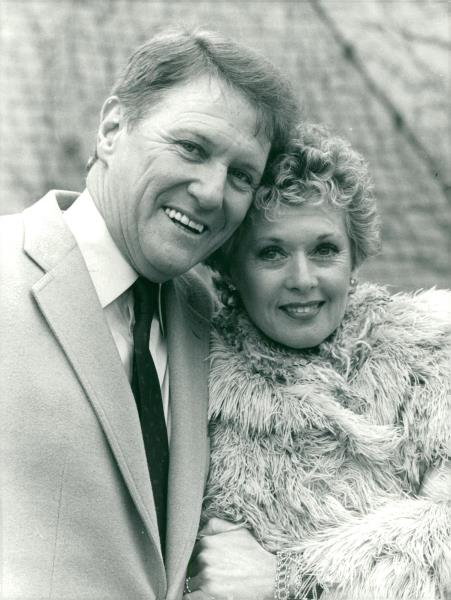
Hedren with Noel Marshall in 1982; both filed divorce the same year.

Hedren met future advertising executive Peter Griffith while doing a walk-on role on The Aldrich Family. On October 24, 1951, the couple took out a marriage license in New York, and were married in 1952. The couple had one daughter, actress Melanie Griffith, born on August 9, 1957. They divorced in 1960, after which Hedren dated comedian Mort Sahl.

On September 27, 1964, Hedren married her then-agent Noel Marshall, who later produced three of her films. The marriage came under strain during the filming of Roar in 1981. They divorced in 1982, with Hedren securing a restraining order forbidding Marshall from coming within 20 feet of her.

On February 15, 1985, she married steel manufacturer Luis Barrenechea. They divorced in 1992. According to Hedren, Barrenechea "was everything I wanted in a man, except that he was an alcoholic and that was unbearable."

Hedren was engaged to veterinarian Martin Dinnes from 2002 until their breakup in mid-2008. In September 2008, Hedren told The Sunday Times "I'm waiting for someone to sweep me off my feet." Hedren has three grandchildren, including actress Dakota Johnson.

Hedren played a role in the development of Vietnamese-American nail salons in the United States. In 1975, while an international relief coordinator with Food for the Hungry, she began visiting with refugees at Hope Village outside Sacramento, California. When she learned the women were interested in her manicured nails, she employed her nail technician to teach them the skills of the trade and worked with a local beauty school to help them find jobs.

Hedren's work with Vietnamese-Americans was the subject of several documentaries: Happy Hands, directed by Honey Lauren, which won Best Documentary Short at the Sonoma International Film Festival in 2014; and Nailedit: Vietnamese and the Nail Industry, which won the Center for Asian American Media 2014 Documentary Fund Award. Creative Nail Design (CND) and the Beauty Changes Lives Foundation (BCL) created the BCL CND Tippi Hedren Nail Scholarship Fund to support professional nail education and it was administered starting January 1, 2014, until Fall 2017.

Hedren was instrumental in helping Kieu Chinh enter the US after the Fall of Saigon in 1975. Hedren arranged for an air ticket and a visa for Chinh and then invited her to stay in her house.

Hedren suffered from severe and persistent headaches for a long time, which rendered her unable to accept several projects, including a television series produced by and starring Betty White. After she got a titanium plate put in her neck, she improved and then agreed, with the blessing of her doctor, to take the part of Doris Thompson, a dying woman, in the 2006 soap opera Fashion House. While she was rehearsing a scene, a gallon of water fell from the ceiling onto her head. The headaches returned after the incident and persisted.

Hedren filed a suit to receive recompense following her inability to work. Hedren's lawyer, Joseph Allen, made a mistake in his discussions with the defendants that allowed them to block him from filing suit. Hedren sued Allen for malpractice. In 2013, The Hollywood Reporter reported that Hedren had been awarded a $1.5 million settlement, including $213,400 for past lost earnings and $440,308 for future lost earnings, against her former lawyer.

Hedren was hurt by the report, since she had not collected the award. She gave an interview to explain that her former lawyer does not have the money to pay her, and discussed how the report put her in a difficult situation since her foundation was in dire need of funds. She explained that she has to raise $75,000 monthly just to keep it going. "Chances are I won't ever even see the money, and that's what hurts so badly, that in all of this pain and suffering that publication ran with a swift and not researched story, which told people around the world who have been so gracious and thoughtful about sending donations, that I no longer needed them."

Hedren is a pescetarian.

In February 2024, it was reported that Hedren is suffering from dementia.

== Filmography ==
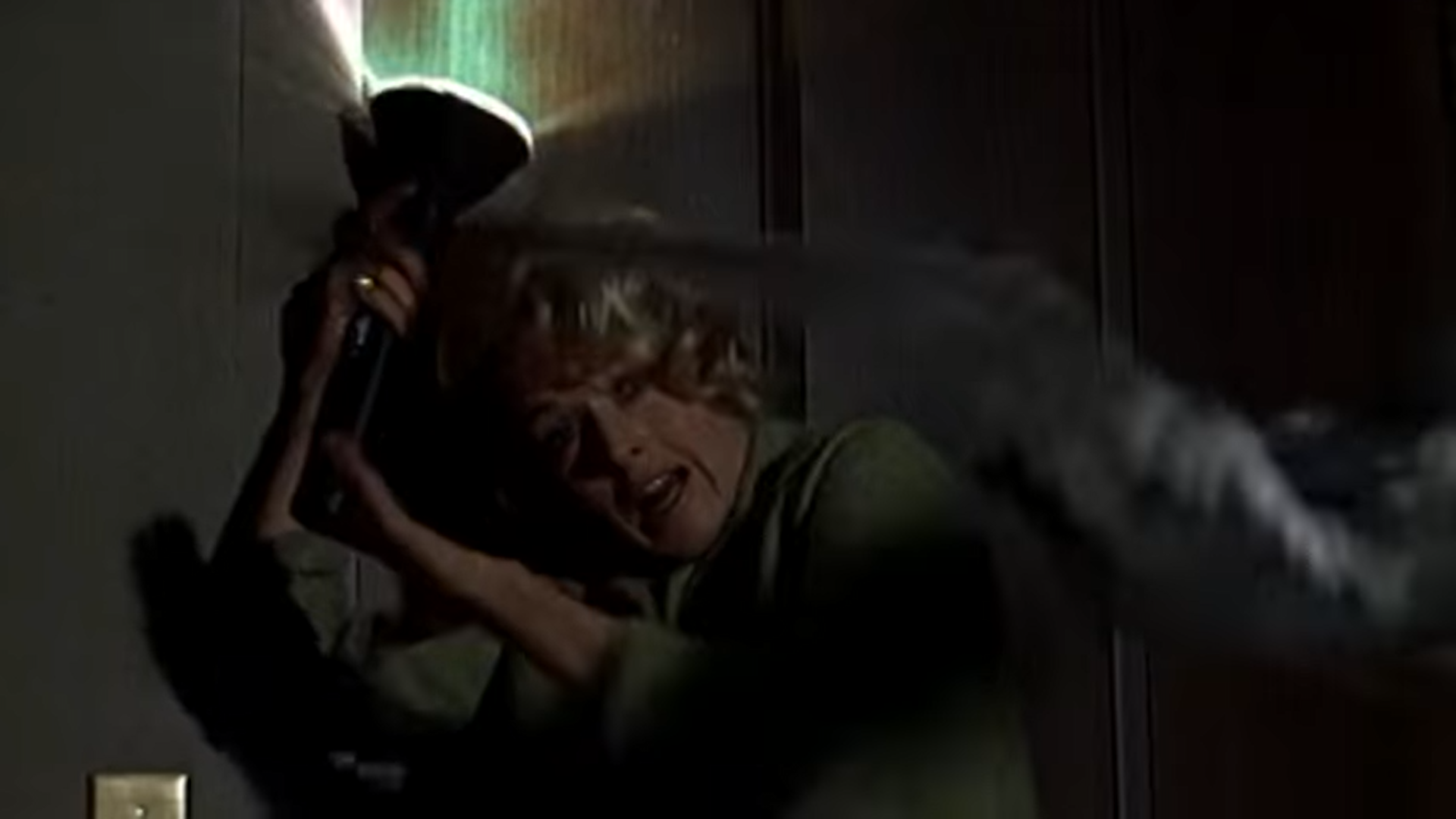
In The Birds (1963)

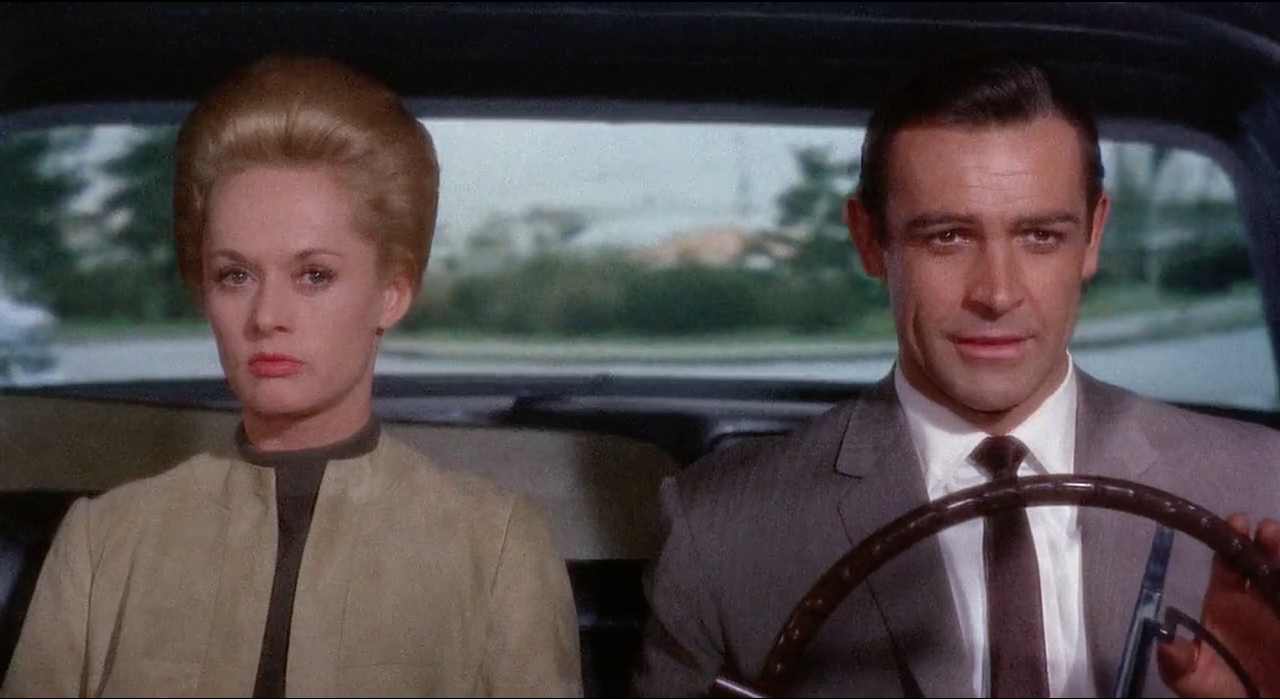
With Sean Connery in Marnie (1964)

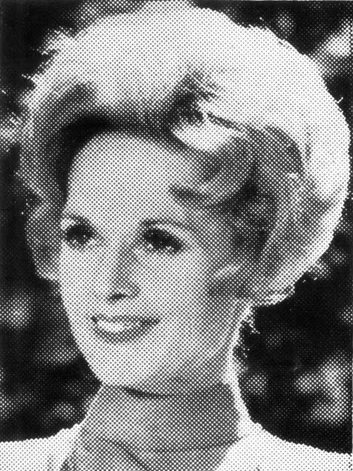
In Tiger by the Tail (1970)

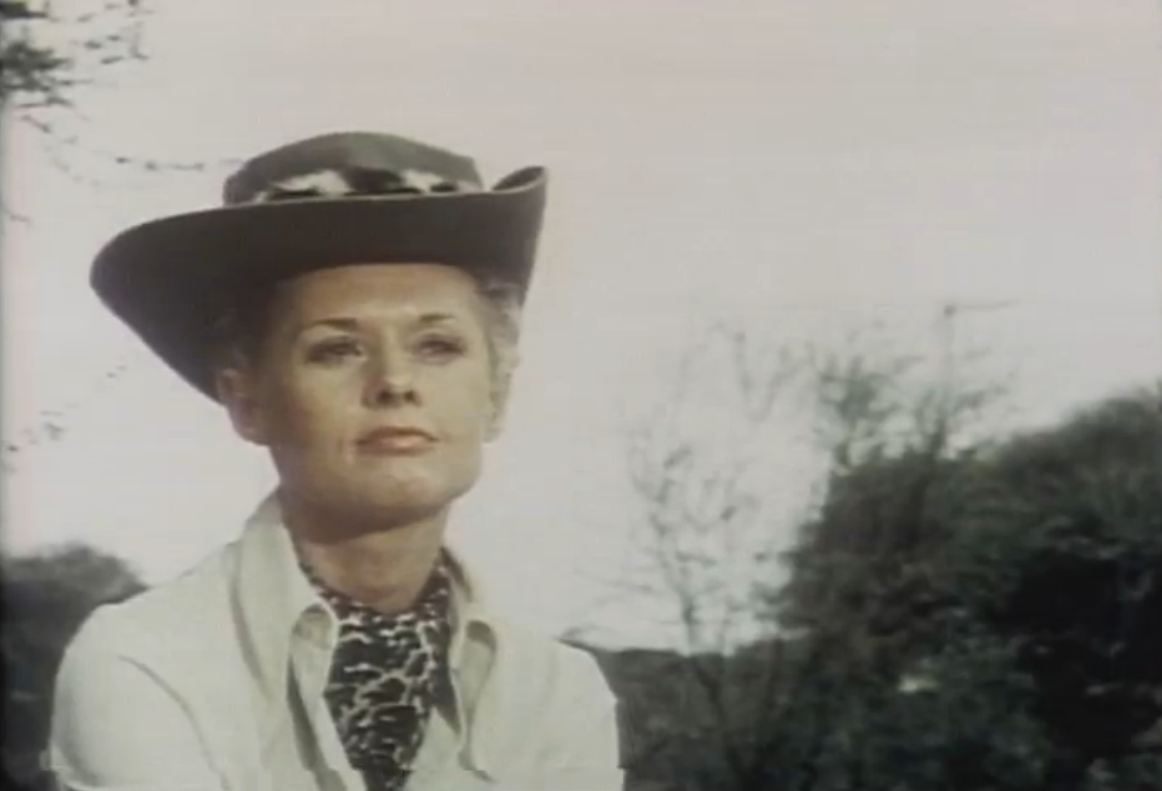
In Satan's Harvest (1970)

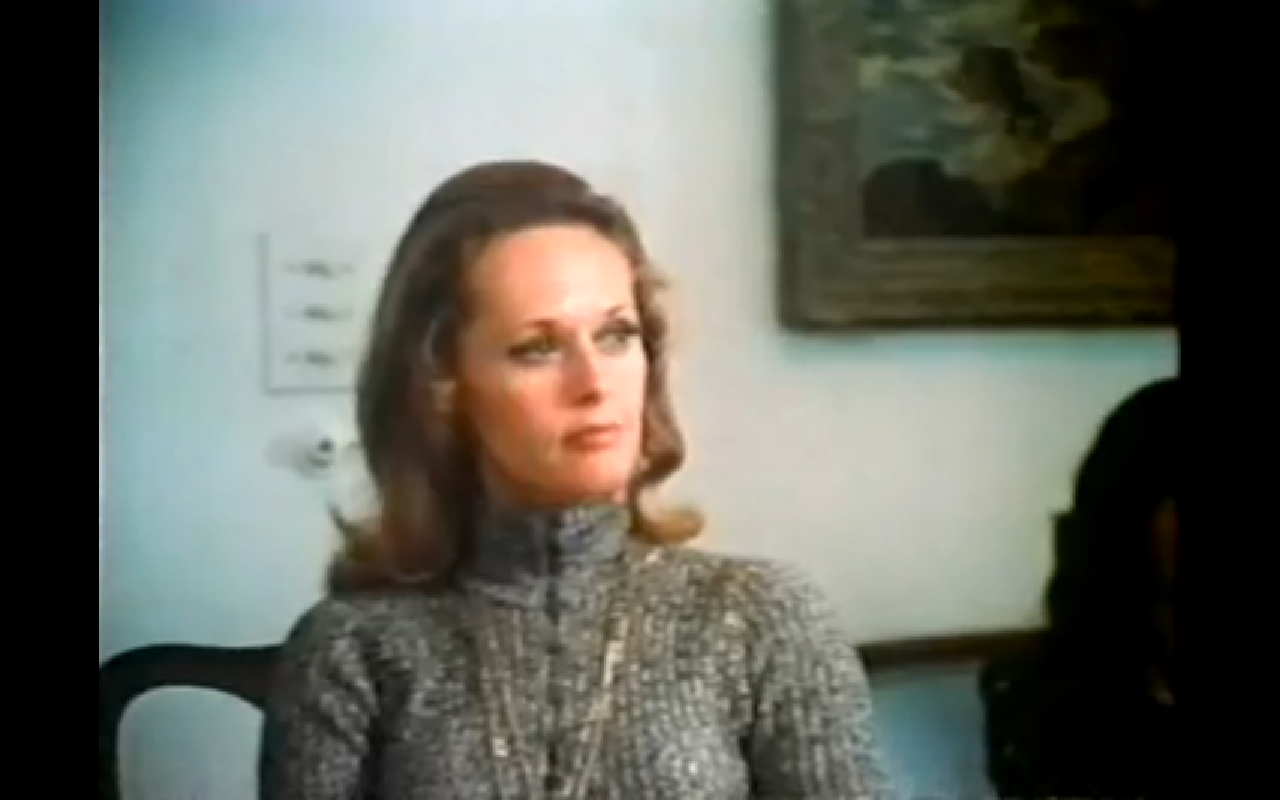
In The Harrad Experiment (1973)

=== Film ===
Year	Title	Role	Notes
1950	The Petty Girl	Ice Box Petty Girl	Uncredited
1963	The Birds	Melanie Daniels	
1964	Marnie	Margaret "Marnie" Edgar	
1967	A Countess from Hong Kong	Martha Mears	
1970	Tiger by the Tail	Rita Armstrong	
1970	Satan's Harvest	Marla Oaks	
1971	Mister Kingstreet's War	Mary Kingstreet	
1973	The Harrad Experiment	Margaret Tenhausen	
1981	Roar	Madelaine	
1982	Foxfire Light	Elizabeth Morgan	
1989	Deadly Spygames	Chastity	
1990	In the Cold of the Night	Clara	
1990	Pacific Heights	Florence Peters	
1994	Teresa's Tattoo	Evelyn Hill	
1994	Inevitable Grace	Dr. Marcia Stevens	
1996	Citizen Ruth	Jessica Weiss	
1997	Mulligans!	Dottie	Short film
1998	Break Up	Mrs. Dade	
1998	I Woke Up Early the Day I Died	Maylinda Austed	
1998	Internet Love	Herself	
1999	The Storytellers	Lillian Glosner	
2001	Tea with Grandma	Rae	Short film
2001	Ice Cream Sundae	Lady	Short film
2003	Searching for Haizmann	Dr. Michelle Labner	
2003	Dark Wolf	Mary	Video
2003	Rose's Garden	Rose	Short film
2003	Julie and Jack	Julie McNeal	
2004	Raising Genius	Babe	
2004	Mind Rage	Dr. Wilma Randolph	
2004	I Heart Huckabees	Mary Jane Hutchinson	
2005	The Last Confederate: The Story of Robert Adams	Mrs. Adams	
2005	Diamond Zero	Eleanor Kelly	
2007	Dead Write	Minnie	
2008	Her Morbid Desires	Gloria	Video
2012	Jayne Mansfield's Car	Naomi Caldwell	Uncredited; scenes cut
2012	Free Samples	Betty	
2013	Return to Babylon	Mrs. Peabody	
2017	The Ghost and the Whale	Tippi	

=== Television ===
Year	Title	Role	Notes
1965	Kraft Suspense Theatre	Lee Anne Wickheimer	Episode: "The Trains of Silence"
1965	Run for Your Life	Jessica Braden	Episode: "Someone Who Makes Me Feel Beautiful"
1970	The Courtship of Eddie's Father	Cissy Drummond-Randolph	2 episodes
1973	Docteur Caraïbes	Sonia	Episode: "The Man and the Albatross"
1976	The Bionic Woman	Susan Victor	Episode: "Claws"
1982	Blue Peter	Herself	
1983	Hart to Hart	Liza Atterton	Episode: "Hunted Harts"
1984	Tales from the Darkside	Ruth Anderson	Episode: "Mookie and Pookie"
1985	Alfred Hitchcock Presents	Waitress	Episode: "Man from the South"
1988	Hotel	Barbara Lyman	Episode: "Double Take"
1988	Baby Boom	Laura Curtis	Episode: "Christmas '88"
1990	Return to Green Acres	Arleen	Television film
1990–1991	The Bold and the Beautiful	Helen Maclaine	TV series
1991	Shadow of a Doubt	Teresa Mathewson	Television film
1991	In the Heat of the Night	Annabelle Van Buren	Episode: "Liar's Poker"
1992	Through the Eyes of a Killer	Mrs. Bellano	Television film
1993	Perry Mason: The Case of the Skin-Deep Scandal	Beverly Courtney	Television film
1993	Murder, She Wrote	Catherine Noble	Episode: "Bloodlines"
1994	The Birds II: Land's End	Helen	Television film
1994	Treacherous Beauties	Lettie Hollister	Television film
1994–1996	Dream On	Di	Recurring role
1997	Adventures from the Book of Virtues	Madame Sofroni	Voice, episode: "Generosity"
1997	The Guardian	Wynn	Television film
1998	Chicago Hope	Alfreda Perkins	Episode: "Psychodrama"
1998	The New Batman Adventures	Donna Day	Voice, episode: "Mean Seasons"
1998	Invasion America	Mrs. McAllister	Voice, 2 episodes
1999	The Darklings	Martha Jackson	Television film
1999	Replacing Dad	Dixie	Television film
2000	Bull	Caitlin Coyle	Episode: "A Beautiful Lie"
2000	Providence	Constance Hemming	2 episodes
2001	The Nightmare Room	The Witch	Episode: "Fear Games"
2003	111 Gramercy Park	Mrs. Granville	Television film
2006	Fashion House	Doris Thompson	Recurring role
2006	The 4400	Lily Tyler	Episode: "The New World"
2008	CSI: Crime Scene Investigation	Karen Rosenthal	Episode: "Young Man with a Horn"
2009	Tribute	Mrs. Hennessey	Television film
2011	Batman: The Brave and the Bold	Hippolyta	Voice, episode: "Triumvirate of Terror!"
2012	Raising Hope	Nana	Episode: "Not Indecent, But Not Quite Decent Enough Proposal"
2013	Cougar Town	Herself	Episode: "Have Love Will Travel"

== Honors and awards ==
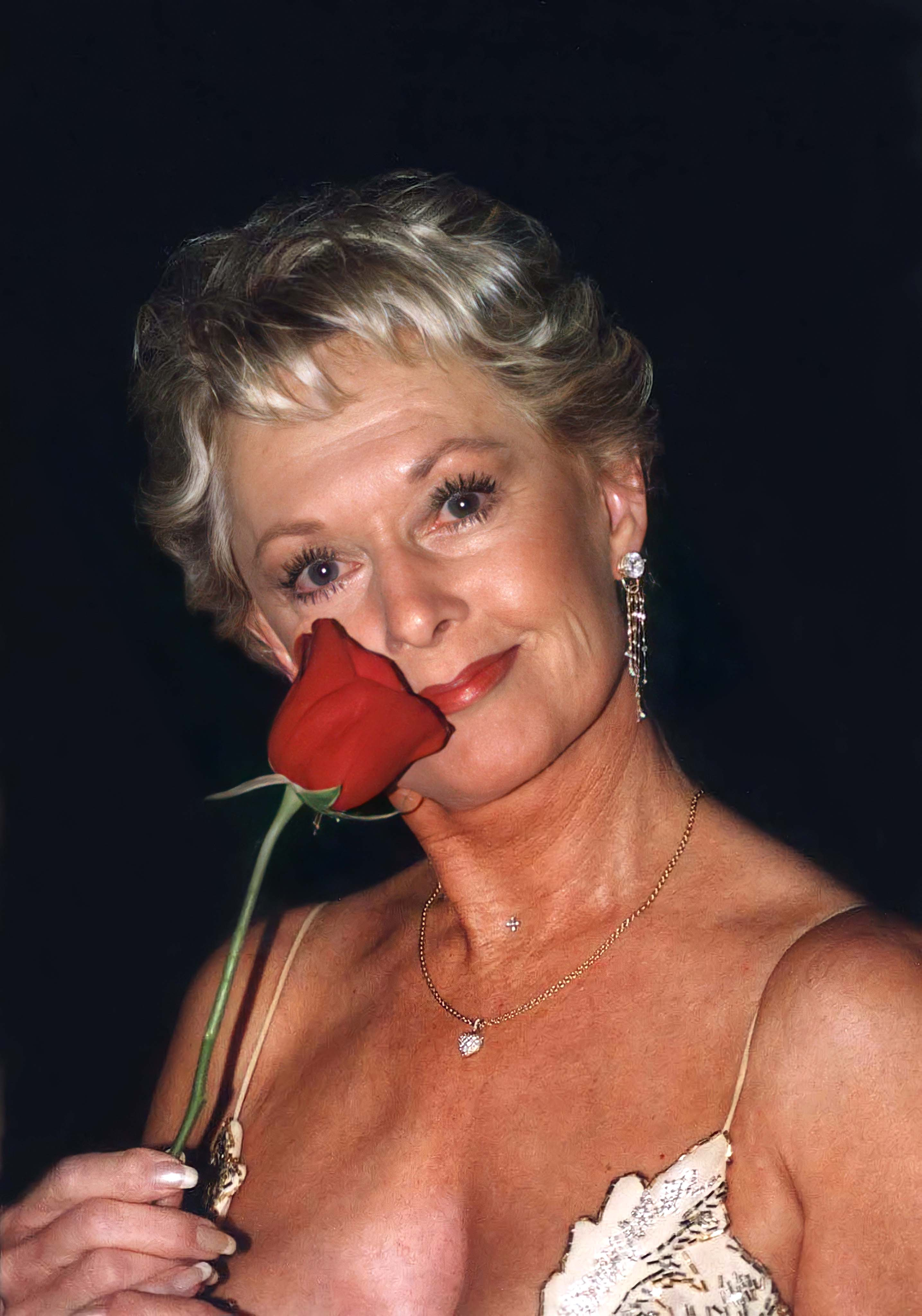
Hedren in 2002

- 1964: Most Promising Newcomer Award by Photoplay
- 1964: Golden Globe Award for New Star of the Year - Actress (shared with Ursula Andress and Elke Sommer)
- 1994: Life Achievement Award in France at The Beauvais Film Festival Cinemalia
- 1995: Life Achievement Award in Spain, La Fundación Municipal de Cine
- 1995: The Helen Woodward Animal Center's Annual Humane Award
- 1996: Founder's Award from the American Society for the Prevention of Cruelty to Animals
- 1997: Lion and Lamb Award from Wildhaven
- 1999: Woman of Vision Award from Women of Film and Video in Washington, D.C.
- 1999: Presidential Medal for her work in film from Hofstra University
- 1999: Humanitarian Award at the Las Vegas International Film Festival
- 2000: Best Actress in a Comedy Short Award in the short film Mulligans! at the Method Fest, Independent Film Festival
- 2002: Best Actress Award for the short film Tea with Grandma from the New York International Independent Film Festival
- 2003: Received a star on the Hollywood Walk of Fame
- 2003: Women of Los Angeles Annual Hope is a Woman Honor
- 2004: PAWS Companion for Life Award
- 2004: Best Actress Award for the short film Rose's Garden from the Los Angeles TV Short Film Festival
- 2004: Animal Rights Advocacy Award at Artivist Film Festival
- 2005: Living Legacy Award
- 2006: Conservationist of the Year—Dino Award from the Las Vegas Natural History Museum
- 2007: Lifetime Achievement Award—Riverside Film Festival
- 2007: Jules Verne "Nature" Award — the 1st Annual Jules Verne Adventure Film Festival of Los Angeles
- 2008: Academy of Art University's 2nd Epidemic Film Festival Award
- 2008: Jules Verne Legendaire Award
- 2008: Thespian Award – LA Femme Film Festival
- 2009: "When a Woman Wills She Will!" Award by the Woman's Club of Hollywood
- 2009: Workhouse's first Lifetime Achievement in the Arts Award
- 2009: Received the First Star on the Orinda Theater Walk of Fame
- 2010: Received the Lifetime Achievement Award at the 24th Annual Genesis Awards show from the Humane Society
- 2010: BraveHeart Award
- 2010: Who-Manitarian Award
- 2011: Lifetime Achievement Award from the Hollywood Chamber of Commerce at its 90th Annual Installation & Awards Luncheon
- 2011: "The Women Together Award" from the United Nations
- 2011: Vietnamese-American Marton Saint Award from the Boat People SOS Organization
- 2011: Omni Youth Humanitarian/Career Achievement Award
- 2012: Honorary Masters of Fine Arts Degree from the New York Film Academy
- 2012: Mayor Career Achievement Award from Starz Denver Film Festival
- 2013: Legacy of Style Award
- 2013: Lifetime Achievement Award at the Puerto Rico Horror Film Fest
- 2013: "People Helping People" Award by the Touching Live TV Award Show, broadwayworld.com; accessed November 14, 2015.
- 2014: Lifetime Achievement Award from Bel-Air Film Festival
- 2014: Special Recognition Award from Acton Women's Club
- 2014:The Women's International Film & Television Showcase Foundation International Visionary Award, thewifts.org; accessed November 14, 2015.
- 2015: Choreography of Desire (A Tribute to Tippi Hedren) by the Vienna International Film Festival, viennale.at; accessed November 14, 2015.
- 2015: Believe, Achieve, Empower Award
- 2017: Los Angeles Press Club's 2017 Visionary Award
- 2017: Waggy Award recipient from the Tailwaggers Foundation
- 2017: The Icon Award
- 2017: Lifetime Achievement Award from the Southern California Motion Picture Council
- 2018: "Friend for Life Award" from The Palm Springs Animal Shelter
