= Harry Waxman =

English cinematographer (1912–1984)

Harry Waxman, B.S.C. (3 April 1912 – 24 December 1984) was an English cinematographer.

Born in London, Waxman won an award from the British Society of Cinematographers for Sapphire in 1959. His other films included Brighton Rock (1947), Swiss Family Robinson (1960), The Day the Earth Caught Fire (1961), Crooks in Cloisters (1964), The Nanny (1965), The Anniversary (1968), and The Wicker Man (1973). His work on Robbery Under Arms is one of the few aspects of that film that has been universally praised.

Waxman served as a cinematographer in the RAF film unit during World War II.

== Selected filmography ==
- Brighton Rock (1948)
- To the Public Danger (1948)
- Trottie True (1949)
- The Long Memory (1953)
- Sapphire (1959)
- Swiss Family Robinson (1960)
- The Day the Earth Caught Fire (1961)
- Stolen Hours (1962)
- The Bargee (1964)
- Crooks in Cloisters (1964)
- She (1965)
- The Nanny (1965)
- The Family Way (1966)
- The Anniversary (1968)
- Twisted Nerve (1968)
- Wonderwall (1968)
- Till Death Do Us Part (1968)
- There's a Girl in My Soup (1970)
- The Wicker Man (1973)
- Digby, the Biggest Dog in the World (1973)
- Blue Blood (1973)
- The Pink Panther Strikes Again (1976)
