= Whitney Able =

American actress, model

- Born: Houston, Texas, U.S.
- Occupations: Actress, model
- Years active: 2005–present
- Spouse: Scoot McNairy (m. 2010; div. 2019) Justin Melnick (m. 2020)
- Children: 3

Whitney Able is an American actress and model. She is best known for her roles in All the Boys Love Mandy Lane (2006) and Monsters (2010), and has been featured in Maxim magazine.

== Early life ==
Whitney Able was born in Houston, Texas. She has two brothers. She has lived in Spain and Mexico and is fond of the Spanish language.

== Career ==
Able's acting career started with a role in the low-budget film Age of Kali in 2005. She then portrayed Eve in the film Dead Lenny, which was released direct-to-DVD in 2006. She then gained a role in the pilot of the TV show Secrets of a Small Town; however the show was not picked up by American Broadcasting Company. She also had a role on the ABC show Rodney.

Able's breakout role was in the 2006 horror film All the Boys Love Mandy Lane, portraying the bitchy but also sympathetic cheerleader Chloe. The film co-starred Amber Heard and received mixed reviews from critics. Able then appeared in guest roles in television series including CSI: New York, Cold Case. Her next film role came in Emmanuelle Vaugier's horror vehicle Unearthed, in which she plays Ally. The film was one of the 8 films to die for at horrorfest and received poor reviews from critics. She also starred in the direct-to-DVD releases Love and Mary and Remarkable Power.

Able appeared in a number of independent films before landing the leading role in the 2010 film Monsters, a low-budget sci-fi horror film. The movie was critically praised. In the same year, she had a role in Tales of an Ancient Empire. She ranked #83 on the Maxim magazine Hot 100 of 2008 list. In 2015, she starred in the independent feature-length thriller Dark, directed by Nick Basile.

In 2021, Able starred in We Won't Forget, a short film directed by Edgar Morais and Lucas Elliot Eberl and co-written by Able and both directors that had its world premiere in competition at Palm Springs International ShortFest. Whitney stars in the film as a woman whose frustrations boil to the surface while hosting a party for her friends, culminating in a public freakout that turns into collective hysteria.

== Personal life ==
Able married actor Scoot McNairy in June 2010. They have two children. On November 19, 2019, Able announced that they had divorced.

== Filmography ==
=== Film ===
Year	Title	Role	Notes
2005	Age of Kali	Sabrina	
2006	Dead Lenny	Eve	
2006	All the Boys Love Mandy Lane	Chloe	
2007	Love and Mary	Lucy	
2007	Unearthed	Ally	
2008	Remarkable Power	Candy	
2009	Mercy	Heather	
2010	Tough Trade	Carmen	Television film
2010	Everything Will Happen Before You Die	Jasmine	
2010	More Things Change	Robyn	
2010	The Man That I Was	Rachel	
2010	Monsters	Samantha Wynden	
2010	Tales of an Ancient Empire	Xia	
2010	Pound of Flesh	Rachel Fry	
2010	The Kane Files: Life of Trial	Anna Kane	
2010	Black Hole	Eliza	Short film
2011	Literally, Right Before Aaron	Girl from Vermont	Short film
2011	Bad Actress	Rebecca Pillage	
2011	Annabel	Annabel	Short film
2012	Free Samples	Dana	
2013	Straight A's	Fran	
2014	A Walk Among the Tombstones	Denise	
2014	Man Without a Head	Girl #4	
2015	Dark	Kate	
2015	Ava's Possessions	Jillian	
2016	Fluidic	Fave	

=== Television ===
Year	Title	Role	Notes
2006	Secrets of a Small Town	Meredith	Unsold television pilot
2006	Rodney	Physical Education Major	Episode: "Where the Rubber Meets the Road"
2007	CSI: NY	Rita Steinway	Episode: "Obsession"
2007	Cold Case	Rainey Karlsen (1997)	Episode: "Stand Up and Holler"
2010	Nikita	Hanna Cushko	Episode: "2.0"
2010	Criminal Minds	Penny Hanley	Episode: "Reflection of Desire"
2017	Godless	Anna McNue	2 episodes
