= Remarkable Power =

- Directed by: Brandon Beckner
- Written by: Brandon Beckner; Scott Sampila
- Produced by: Scott Sampila; Mykel Denis
- Starring: Tom Arnold; Kevin Nealon; Evan Peters; Nora Zehetner; Kip Pardue; Dulé Hill
- Release date: January 26, 2008 (Santa Barbara)
- Running time: 91 minutes
- Country: United States
- Language: English

Remarkable Power is a 2008 comedy film directed by Brandon Beckner, who also co-wrote the script. The film features Tom Arnold, Kevin Nealon, Evan Peters, Nora Zehetner, Kip Pardue, Dulé Hill and Johnny Messner. It was filmed between October 9 and November 4, 2006 in Los Angeles.

== Synopsis ==
Remarkable Power is the name of a self-help book which plays a central role in the film about a late night talk show host who goes through all lengths to bring his canceled show back on the air.[3]

== Cast ==
- Whitney Able as Candy
- Tom Arnold as Van Hagen
- Jordan Belfi as Skip
- Sandra Hess as Cynthia West
- Dulé Hill as Reggie
- Kip Pardue as Preston
- Evan Peters as Ross
- Jack Plotnick as Moses
- Johnny Messner as Doug Wade
- Kevin Nealon as Jack West
- Bob Sapp as Tiny
- Christopher Titus as JP Zahn
- Steve Vinovich as Bill
- Nora Zehetner as Athena
- Lisa Arturo as Trish
- Stephen Keys as Damon
- Jason Cottle as Ed Vega
- Adam Gregor as Vlado
- Vlad Schiau as Gustav
- Ed Ackerman as Detective Shaver
- C.J. Byrnes as Detective Mack

== Production ==
The project was produced by Mykel Denis and Scott Sampilla. Scott Sampilla also co-wrote the script with director and writing partner Brandon Beckner. The project was filmed entirely in Los Angeles.

== Release ==
The film was released as a Direct-to-DVD on February 16, 2010.
