= Crooks in Cloisters =

1964 British film by Jeremy Summers

- 'Crooks in Cloisters' poster
- Directed by: Jeremy Summers
- Written by: T.J. Morrison; Mike Watts
- Produced by: Gordon Scott
- Starring: Ronald Fraser; Barbara Windsor; Grégoire Aslan; Bernard Cribbins; Melvyn Hayes; Davy Kaye; Wilfrid Brambell
- Cinematography: Harry Waxman
- Edited by: Ann Chegwidden
- Music by: Don Banks
- Production company: Associated British Picture Corporation
- Distributed by: Warner-Pathé Distributors
- Release date: 11 August 1964
- Running time: 98 minutes
- Country: United Kingdom
- Language: English

Crooks in Cloisters is a 1964 British comedy film directed by Jeremy Summers and starring Ronald Fraser, Barbara Windsor, Bernard Cribbins and Melvyn Hayes. It was written by T. J. Morrison and Mike Watts.

== Plot ==
After pulling off a train robbery by tricking the train into stopping with false signal lights, 'Little Walter' and his gang are forced to hide out on a remote Cornish island in a monastery (which they buy with their "ill-gotten gains"), disguised as monks. With them comes 'Bikini', Walter's girlfriend, who is given the job of cook to the group, despite never having cooked in her life. After a few initial setbacks, they slowly adjust to their new contemplative life of tending animals and crops, surviving the added tribulations of visits by a group of tourists and two of the real monks who had been forced to sell the monastery after falling on hard times, including Brother Lucius.

Gradually, the gang adjusts to its new pastoral life, which turns out to be much to their liking. A return to a life in the city is less appealing by the day. With the help of Phineas, a fisherman, they continue to receive and dispose of stolen goods. The crooks change and are kinder and gentler, but 'Brother' Squirts begins to place bets on the dogs and the police become suspicious. When Walter decides it is safe to leave, none of them want to go, including Willy, who has fallen for June, Phineas's granddaughter; these two manage to get away safely together. Walter gives the deeds of the island to the real monks who had originally owned it, and just as the rest of the gang say goodbye, they see the police waiting for them.

== Cast ==
- Ronald Fraser as Little Walter (Walt)
- Barbara Windsor as Bikini
- Grégoire Aslan as Lorenzo
- Bernard Cribbins as Squirts
- Davy Kaye as Specs
- Wilfrid Brambell as Phineas
- Melvyn Hayes as Willy
- Joseph O'Conor as Father Septimus
- Corin Redgrave as Brother Lucius
- Francesca Annis as June
- Norman Chappell as Benson
- Arnold Ridley as newsagent
- Patricia Laffan as Lady Florence
- Alister Williamson as Mungo
- Russell Waters as ship's chandler
- Howard Douglas as publican
- Max Bacon as bookmaker

== Production ==
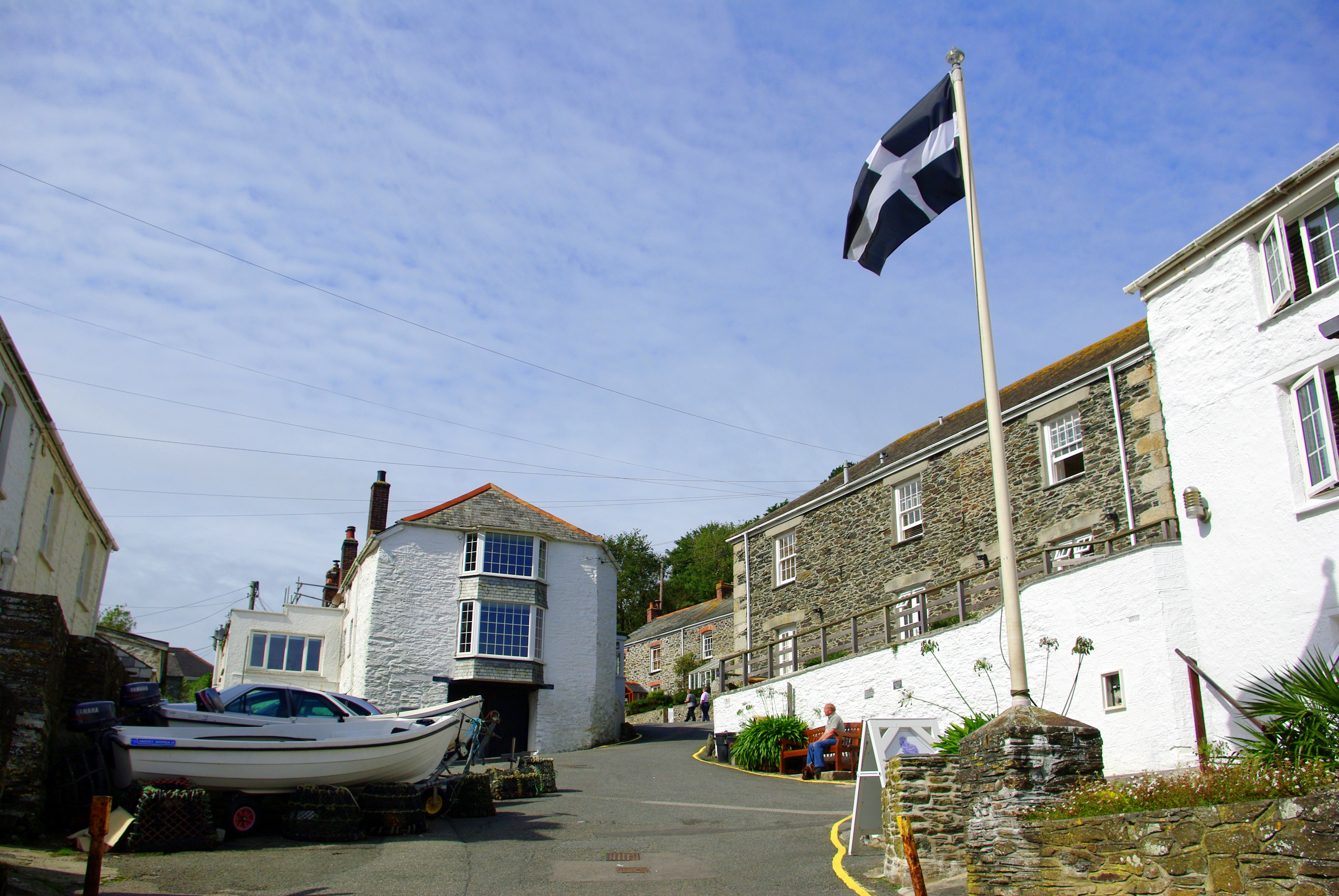
The harbour at Portloe was a location at the end of the film

Crooks in Cloisters was filmed at the Associated British Picture Studios at Borehamwood in Hertfordshire, and at St Mawes in Cornwall. The harbour is Portloe. The opening train robbery sequence involves British Rail class 4 diesel locomotive D140 (later to become class 46 under TOPS) at an as-yet unidentified location. The exteriors sequences for the monastery were filmed around the grounds of Ashridge House in Ashridge near Berkhamsted in Hertfordshire.

== Critical reception ==
The Monthly Film Bulletin wrote: "Surprisingly, this turns out to be one of those films which are more entertaining than they look on paper. Some of the material is obvious, certainly, and even ardent enthusiasts of broad farce would seldom find it screamingly funny; but on the other hand, like Jeremy Summers' first film, The Punch and Judy Man, it is done with an ingratiating geniality and quiet good humour, coupled with an absence of the chamber pot jokes usually associated with this type of comedy. Walt's semi-comic yet sincere prayer to the Almighty for the recovery of the critically ill Willy is a touch which could well be dispensed with, although even this is not so embarrassing as it might have been. The casting could hardly have been bettered."

The Radio Times Guide to Films gave the film 3/5 stars, writing: "Anything but a pseudo-Carry On, this cosy bungled crime comedy is much more a product of the post-Ealing school. The emphasis is firmly on character as Ronald Fraser and his gang lie low in a monastery to throw the cops off their trail. Bernard Cribbins is in fine fettle as one of Fraser's gormless colleagues and Barbara Windsor is funnier than the Carry Ons ever allowed her to be."
