= List of Raising Hope episodes =

Raising Hope is an American television sitcom created by Greg Garcia that premiered on Fox on September 21, 2010. Season 1 of the half-hour single-camera television series aired on Tuesdays at 9 pm ET/PT. From the beginning of Season 2, Raising Hope moved to the new time slot of Tuesdays at 9:30 pm EP/PT. In Season 4, the show aired on Fridays at 9pm EST, until switching to 9:30pm on January 24, 2014. In March 2014, the show was cancelled.

During the course of the series, 88 episodes of Raising Hope aired over four seasons, between September 21, 2010, and April 4, 2014.

== Series overview ==
Season	Episodes	Originally released	
Season	Episodes	First released	Last released
1	22	September 21, 2010	May 17, 2011
2	22	September 20, 2011	April 17, 2012
3	22	October 2, 2012	March 28, 2013
4	22	November 15, 2013	April 4, 2014

== Episodes ==
=== Season 1 (2010–11) ===
No. overall	No. in season	Title	Directed by	Written by	Original release date	Prod. code	US viewers (millions)
1	1	"Pilot"	Michael Fresco	Greg Garcia	September 21, 2010	1ARY79	7.31
2	2	"Dead Tooth"	Michael Fresco	Greg Garcia	September 28, 2010	1ARY01	7.09
3	3	"Dream Hoarders"	Michael Fresco	Ralph Greene	October 5, 2010	1ARY02	6.18
4	4	"Say Cheese"	Eyal Gordin	Greg Garcia	October 12, 2010	1ARY03	6.01
5	5	"Happy Halloween"	Greg Garcia	Dan Coscino	October 26, 2010	1ARY06	6.00
6	6	"Family Secrets"	Randall Einhorn	Bobby Bowman	October 26, 2010	1ARY04	5.37
7	7	"The Sniffles"	Eyal Gordin	Mike Mariano	November 9, 2010	1ARY05	5.77
8	8	"Blue Dots"	Eyal Gordin	Liz Astrof	November 16, 2010	1ARY07	5.91
9	9	"Meet the Grandparents"	Jace Alexander	Elijah Aron & Jordan Young	November 23, 2010	1ARY08	5.70
10	10	"Burt Rocks"	Jace Alexander	Alan Kirschenbaum	November 30, 2010	1ARY10	6.65
11	11	"Toy Story"	Michael Fresco	Bobby Bowman	December 7, 2010	1ARY09	6.92
12	12	"Romeo and Romeo"	Eyal Gordin	Ralph Greene & Tim Stack	February 8, 2011	1ARY13	6.58
13	13	"A Germ of a Story"	Phil Traill	Tim Stack	February 15, 2011	1ARY11	5.36
14	14	"What Up, Cuz?"	Rebecca Asher	Bobby Bowman	February 22, 2011	1ARY12	6.00
15	15	"Snip Snip"	Chris Koch	Mike Mariano	March 1, 2011	1ARY17	8.68
16	16	"The Cultish Personality"	Phil Traill	Matthew W. Thompson	March 8, 2011	1ARY14	6.60
17	17	"Mongooses"	Eyal Gordin	Bobby Bowman	March 15, 2011	1ARY15	5.74
18	18	"Cheaters"	Dan Attias	Elijah Aron & Jordan Young	April 19, 2011	1ARY16	5.31
19	19	"Sleep Training"	Eyal Gordin	Bobby Bowman & Sean Conaway	April 26, 2011	1ARY19	4.53
20	20	"Everybody Flirts... Sometimes"	Jerry Levine	Christine Zander	May 3, 2011	1ARY18	4.67
21	21	"Baby Monitor"	Eyal Gordin	Bobby Bowman	May 10, 2011	1ARY21	5.05
22	22	"Don't Vote for This Episode"	Greg Garcia	Greg Garcia	May 17, 2011	1ARY20	5.40

=== Season 2 (2011–12) ===
No. overall	No. in season	Title	Directed by	Written by	Original release date	Prod. code	US viewers (millions)
23	1	"Prodigy"	Eyal Gordin	Christine Zander	September 20, 2011	2ARY02	6.73
24	2	"Sabrina Has Money"	Troy Miller	Michael Pennie	September 27, 2011	2ARY03	6.14
25	3	"Kidnapped"	Mike Mariano	Elijah Aron & Jordan Young	October 4, 2011	2ARY01	6.36
26	4	"Henderson, Nevada-Adjacent Baby! Henderson, Nevada-Adjacent!"	Dan Attias	Alan Kirschenbaum & Mike Mariano	October 5, 2011	2ARY05	5.85
27	5	"Killer Hope"	Michael Fresco	Ralph Greene & Tim Stack	November 1, 2011	2ARY06	5.37
28	6	"Jimmy and the Kid"	Eyal Gordin	Bobby Bowman	November 8, 2011	2ARY04	4.51
29	7	"Burt's Parents"	Eyal Gordin	Sean Conaway	November 15, 2011	2ARY07	4.84
30	8	"Bro-gurt"	Mike Mariano	Michael Pennie	November 29, 2011	2ARY08	5.34
31	9	"The Men of New Natesville"	Michael Fresco	Matthew W. Thompson	December 6, 2011	2ARY09	4.57
32	10	"It's a Hopeful Life"	Tucker Gates	Ralph Greene & Tim Stack	December 13, 2011	2ARY11	4.98
33	11	"Mrs. Smartypants"	Eyal Gordin	Alan Kirschenbaum & Mike Mariano	January 17, 2012	2ARY13	5.03
34	12	"Gambling Again"	Rebecca Asher	Deweyne LaMar Lee	January 31, 2012	2ARY10	4.62
35	13	"Tarot Cards"	Lee Shallat Chemel	Amy Hubbs	February 7, 2012	2ARY12	4.47
36	14	"Jimmy's Fake Girlfriend"	Rebecca Asher	Bobby Bowman	February 14, 2012	2ARY14	4.58
37	15	"Sheer Madness"	Phil Traill	Story by : Josh Wolf; Teleplay by : Greg Garcia	February 21, 2012	2ARY16	4.73
38	16	"Single White Female Role Model"	Eyal Gordin	Bobby Bowman	March 6, 2012	2ARY19	4.74
39	17	"Spanks Butt, No Spanks"	Rebecca Asher	Michael Pennie	March 13, 2012	2ARY18	4.31
40	18	"Poking Holes in the Story"	Eyal Gordin	Matthew W. Thompson	March 20, 2012	2ARY15	3.78
41	19	"Hogging All the Glory"	Mike Mariano	Mike Mariano	March 27, 2012	2ARY20	3.81
42	20	"Sabrina's New Jimmy"	Matt Shakman	Elijah Aron & Jordan Young	April 3, 2012	2ARY17	3.93
43	21	"Inside Probe"	Greg Garcia	Alan Kirschenbaum & Tim Stack	April 10, 2012	2ARY22	3.81
44	22	"I Want My Baby Back, Baby Back, Baby Back!"	Eyal Gordin	Bobby Bowman	April 17, 2012	2ARY21	3.79

=== Season 3 (2012–13) ===
No. overall	No. in season	Title	Directed by	Written by	Original release date	Prod. code	US viewers (millions)
45	1	"Not Indecent, But Not Quite Decent Enough Proposal"	Greg Garcia	Greg Garcia	October 2, 2012	3ARY01	3.90
46	2	"Throw Maw Maw from the House (Part 1)"	Eyal Gordin	Greg Garcia & Fred Shafferman	October 9, 2012	3ARY02	4.03
47	3	"Throw Maw Maw from the House (Part 2)"	Eyal Gordin	Elijah Aron & Jordan Young	October 16, 2012	3ARY03	4.23
48	4	"If a Ham Falls in the Woods"	Eyal Gordin	Mark Stegemann	October 23, 2012	3ARY05	4.10
49	5	"Don't Ask, Don't Tell Me What To Do"	Eyal Gordin	Matthew W. Thompson	October 30, 2012	3ARY07	4.05
50	6	"What Up, Bro?"	Mike Mariano	Mike Mariano	November 13, 2012	3ARY04	3.73
51	7	"Candy Wars"	Michael Fresco	Ralph Greene & Fred Schafferman	November 20, 2012	3ARY09	3.57
52	8	"The Walk for the Runs"	Rebecca Asher	Joey Gutierrez	November 27, 2012	3ARY06	3.87
53	9	"Squeak Means Squeak"	Lee Shallat Chemel	Stephnie Weir	December 4, 2012	3ARY10	3.66
54	10	"The Last Christmas"	Greg Garcia	Greg Garcia	December 11, 2012	3ARY08	4.03
55	11	"Credit Where Credit is Due"	Eyal Gordin	Paul A. Kaplan & Mark Torgove	January 8, 2013	3ARY11	3.74
56	12	"Lord of the Ring"	Dan Attias	Timothy Stack	January 15, 2013	3ARY12	3.63
57	13	"What Happens at Howdy's Doesn't Stay at Howdy's"	Eyal Gordin	Gina Gari	January 22, 2013	3ARY13	4.00
58	14	"Modern Wedding"	Rebecca Asher	Sean Conaway	January 29, 2013	3ARY14	3.84
59	15	"Yo Zappa Do (Part 1)"	Eyal Gordin	Amy Hubbs	January 29, 2013	3ARY15	3.32
60	16	"Yo Zappa Do (Part 2)"	Lee Shallat Chemel	Jordan Young & Elijah Aron	February 5, 2013	3ARY16	3.87
61	17	"Sex, Clown and Videotape"	Rebecca Asher	Deweyne LaMar Lee	February 5, 2013	3ARY17	3.53
62	18	"Arbor Daze"	Eyal Gordin	Ralph Greene & Timothy Stack	February 19, 2013	3ARY18	3.65
63	19	"Making the Band"	Mike Mariano	Sean Conaway	February 26, 2013	3ARY19	3.53
64	20	"The Old Girl"	Eyal Gordin	Joey Gutierrez	February 26, 2013	3ARY20	3.12
65	21	"Burt Mitzvah – The Musical"	Eyal Gordin	Paul A. Kaplan & Mark Torgove	March 28, 2013	3ARY21	4.16
66	22	"Mother's Day"	Rick Kelly	Greg Garcia	March 28, 2013	3ARY22	3.28

=== Season 4 (2013–14) ===
No. overall	No. in season	Title	Directed by	Written by	Original release date	Prod. code	US viewers (millions)
67	1	"Déjà Vu Man"	Mike Mariano	Mike Mariano	November 15, 2013	4ARY01	2.38
68	2	"Burt Bucks"	Rebecca Asher	Joey Gutierrez	November 15, 2013	4ARY02	2.03
69	3	"Ship Happens"	David Katzenberg	Sean Conaway	November 22, 2013	4ARY03	2.45
70	4	"Hi-Def"	Mike Mariano	Matthew W. Thompson	November 22, 2013	3ARY24	2.25
71	5	"Extreme Howdy's Makeover"	Jay Karas	Matthew W. Thompson	November 29, 2013	4ARY05	1.74
72	6	"Adoption"	Rebecca Asher	Elijah Aron & Jordan Young	November 29, 2013	4ARY04	1.63
73	7	"Murder, She Hoped"	Rebecca Asher	Audra Sielaff & Becky Mann	December 6, 2013	4ARY08	2.74
74	8	"Dysfunction Function"	Rick Kelly	Mark Stegemann	December 6, 2013	4ARY07	2.13
75	9	"The Chance Who Stole Christmas"	Mike Mariano	Dave Holstein	December 13, 2013	4ARY10	2.10
76	10	"Bee Story"	Ken Whittingham	Mark Torgove & Paul A. Kaplan	December 13, 2013	4ARY06	1.91
77	11	"Hey There, Delilah"	Jeffrey Walker	Timothy Stack	January 10, 2014	4ARY09	2.70
78	12	"Hot Dish"	Rebecca Asher	Kevin Henderson	January 17, 2014	4ARY11	2.50
79	13	"Thrilla in Natesvilla"	Rick Kelly	Shelly Gossman	January 24, 2014	4ARY12	2.35
80	14	"The Road to Natesville"	Rebecca Asher	Mark Stegemann	January 31, 2014	3ARY23	1.85
81	15	"Anniversary Ball"	Timothy Stack	Mike Mariano	February 7, 2014	4ARY13	1.68
82	16	"The One Where They Get High"	Victor Nelli, Jr.	Joey Gutierrez	February 28, 2014	4ARY14	1.80
83	17	"Baby Phat"	Garret Dillahunt	Mark Stegemann	March 7, 2014	4ARY15	1.58
84	18	"Dinner With Tropes"	Rebecca Asher	Mark Torgove & Paul A. Kaplan	March 14, 2014	4ARY16	1.42
85	19	"Para-Natesville Activity"	Melissa Kosar	Jordan Young & Elijah Aron	March 21, 2014	4ARY17	1.38
86	20	"Man's Best Friend"	Richie Keen	Ralph Greene	March 28, 2014	4ARY18	1.53
87	21	"How I Met Your Mullet"	Rick Kelly	Timothy Stack & Matthew W. Thompson	April 4, 2014	4ARY19	1.60
88	22	"The Father/Daughter Dance"	Mike Mariano	Mike Mariano	April 4, 2014	4ARY20	1.52
