= Raising Hope season 1 =

Raising Hope
- Season 1
- DVD cover
- No. of episodes: 22

Release
- Original network: Fox
- Original release: September 21, 2010 – May 17, 2011

Season chronology
- Next → Season 2

The first season of the American television series Raising Hope premiered on September 21, 2010 and concluded on May 17, 2011 on the Fox Television Network. The show aired on Tuesday at 9:00 pm ET. The season consisted of 22 episodes and averaged 6.40 million viewers.

== Cast ==
=== Main cast ===
- Lucas Neff as Jimmy Chance
- Martha Plimpton as Virginia Chance
- Garret Dillahunt as Burt Chance
- Shannon Woodward as Sabrina Collins

=== Recurring cast ===
- Baylie and Rylie Cregut as Hope Chance (born Princess Beyonce Carlyle)
- Cloris Leachman as Barbara June "Maw Maw" Thompson
- Gregg Binkley as Barney Hughes
- Kate Micucci as Shelley
- Todd Giebenhain as Frank Marolla
- Ray Santiago as Javier
- Jermaine Williams as Marcus
- Bijou Phillips as Lucy Carlyle
- Dan Coscino as Dancin' Dan
- Carla Jimenez as Rosa Flores
- Ryan Doom as Wyatt Gill
- Lou Wagner as Wally Phipps
- Skyler Stone as Mike Chance
- Eddie Steeples as Tyler, the Gas Man
- Tichina Arnold as Sylvia

=== Recurring cast in flashback ===
- Kelly Heyer as teenage Virginia
- Cameron Moulene as teenage Burt
- Laura Avey as teenage Delilah
- Trace Garcia as 3-year-old Jimmy (credited as Trace!)
- Mason Cook as 8-year-old Jimmy
- Desiree Cooper as 8-year-old Virginia

=== Guest cast ===
- Linda Gehringer as Louise Thompson
- Greg Germann as Dale Carlyle
- Valerie Mahaffey as Margine Carlyle
- Jason Lee as Smokey Floyd
- Brandon T. Jackson as Justin
- Phill Lewis as Donovan
- Amy Sedaris as Delilah
- J.K. Simmons as Bruce Chance
- Jerry Van Dyke as Mel
- Ethan Suplee as Andrew
- Jaime Pressly as Donna
- Malcolm Barrett as Howdy's west manager

== Production ==
In June 2009, FOX announced it had booked a put pilot commitment with show creator Greg Garcia. Michael Fresco signed on to direct the pilot in September 2009, which was originally titled Keep Hope Alive.

Fox green-lit the pilot to series with an order in mid-May 2010. On May 17, 2010, Fox announced at the upfront presentation that the series, with the new title Raising Hope, was included in its 2010-11 television schedule and set for a fall 2010 premiere.

On October 6, 2010, Fox ordered 9 more episodes of the first season, bringing the first season to 22 episodes.

== Episodes ==
No. overall	No. in season	Title	Directed by	Written by	Original release date	Prod. code	US viewers (millions)
1	1	"Pilot"	Michael Fresco	Greg Garcia	September 21, 2010	1ARY79	7.31
While returning home from getting bubblegum ice cream, 23-year-old Jimmy Chance (Lucas Neff) saves Lucy (Bijou Phillips) from her boyfriend, and has a one-night stand with her in his van parked in the front yard. The next morning Jimmy and his parents, Virginia (Martha Plimpton) and Burt (Garret Dillahunt) realize from a news report that she is a serial killer who has murdered her previous boyfriends, and in response Virginia knocks her out with a television. Eight months later, Jimmy learns that she is pregnant with his child, and after she is sentenced to death, Jimmy has to raise his daughter. Convinced he can do it, he tries to raise her on his own, but eventually his family helps out, renaming the baby from "Princess Beyoncé" to Hope.
2	2	"Dead Tooth"	Michael Fresco	Greg Garcia	September 28, 2010	1ARY01	7.09
When Jimmy realizes he needs a daycare service for Hope, he goes to Sabrina (Shannon Marie Woodward), an employee at the local grocery store and whom he has an infatuation with, for help. She directs him to her cousin, Shelly (Kate Micucci), whom Jimmy had hooked up with two years previously. Jimmy is reluctant to hurt her feelings when she still cares for him, but has a dead tooth on one of her front teeth. When he does hurt her feelings however, Shelly starts charging her services. Meanwhile, Jimmy pressures Virginia to quit smoking for Hope's health; Virginia will only do so if Burt convinces her mentally unstable grandmother Maw Maw (Cloris Leachman) to quit also, which is no easy task. During one of her lucid episodes, Maw Maw reveals she initially quit smoking in the 1970's to live long enough to see Virginia grow up. Virginia decides to follow suit and offers Jimmy money she usually spends on cigarettes to pay for Shelly's day care.
3	3	"Dream Hoarders"	Michael Fresco	Ralph Greene	October 5, 2010	1ARY02	6.18
Jimmy teaches Hope to crawl by placing sugar cubes in a trail on the floor. Unfortunately, this means he must now baby proof the house. As he does so, he realizes Virginia is a hoarder, who is hoarding items in a garage for her life-long dream to one day win the lottery and move to a bigger house. Hope ends up crawling to the garage. After the Chances rescue her, Jimmy removes all the clutter, upsetting Virginia. He also demands they stop dreaming about winning the lottery. In the end, Jimmy decides to go easy on his parents, and tells Hope it is better to dream than to give up on them.
4	4	"Say Cheese"	Eyal Gordin	Greg Garcia	October 12, 2010	1ARY03	6.01
Sabrina visits the Chance house and discovers the history of the horrible family pictures, mostly due to Virginia wanting everything to be perfect. Every year, each picture opportunity ends in disaster. One year, Jimmy decides to take charge himself, but he failed also. The Chances did get one good picture however from a traffic camera, which took a picture of their van as they run a red light, and singing to a tune happily.
5	5	"Happy Halloween"	Greg Garcia	Dan Coscino	October 26, 2010	1ARY06	6.00
On Halloween day, Jimmy is invited to a party by Sabrina when she has a fight with her boyfriend. Jimmy also learns that his father has been scaring him since he was a little boy in order to get hugged by him. Jimmy orders his dad to stay away from Hope and enlists two of his friends to babysit her. Virginia is tasked with taking care of Maw Maw when she thinks she's nine years old again.
6	6	"Family Secrets"	Randall Einhorn	Bobby Bowman	October 26, 2010	1ARY04	5.37
Lucy leaves things for Hope after she is electrocuted in the "bye-bye chair". This includes a video of her while in the prison cell, and the Chances are shocked at her behavior. This leads them to consider whether to keep this a secret from Hope. There, Jimmy realizes that his parents kept secrets from him for years; they admitted Jimmy is not in fact allergic to fruit. Jimmy responds by going on a "fruit binge" until it is revealed he is actually allergic to Starfruit. Later, Jimmy wonders about his grandmother, whom Virginia eventually admits was "killed by a duck." However, Jimmy soon realizes this is another lie, and eventually tracks her down where he finds out she is alive, and simply left her family because she wanted to live a self-centered life without responsibilities, like raising her daughter. Maw Maw lied to protect Virginia from an ugly truth like Virginia was lying to Jimmy. In the end, Sabrina edits Lucy's tape to make it seem as if she was a caring and non-violent mother.
7	7	"The Sniffles"	Eyal Gordin	Mike Mariano	November 9, 2010	1ARY05	5.77
When Hope gets sick, Jimmy tries to get her to see a doctor, only to realize his family has no health insurance. Burt attempts to snag a city contract in order to be able to provide insurance benefits for his only employee, Jimmy. However, Jimmy does not think he would win, and so takes a job as a bag boy in the same grocery store Sabrina works. To his surprise, Burt says he won the contract, but Jimmy realizes later on he has been working for his rival company.
8	8	"Blue Dots"	Eyal Gordin	Liz Astrof	November 16, 2010	1ARY07	5.91
Realizing Hope is the only child in Shelly's daycare, and is starting to act like a dog, Jimmy decides to get her in a high-end daycare center that offers one poor family a scholarship. The only obstacle is that Jimmy learns Burt is a registered sex offender after he was caught having sex with Virginia (at the time he was 17 and she was 15). Burt is advised that in order to expunge this, he has to reveal the fact to his neighborhood. After it is expunged, Maw Maw is arrested for indecent exposure in the courthouse, earning her a blue dot. To expunge this, she has to do community service. Virginia takes her place, but also earns a blue dot after she is caught urinating in public. Jimmy also earns a blue dot asking a prostitute to act as Maw Maw, and is arrested for solicitation. Jimmy and the other poor families fail to earn the scholarship, but all the children are taken to Shelly's daycare, meaning Hope is no longer the only child.
9	9	"Meet the Grandparents"	Jace Alexander	Elijah Aron & Jordan Young	November 23, 2010	1ARY08	5.70
Jimmy wants his family to celebrate Thanksgiving for the first time (which the Chance family believes is "the only Thursday of the year they didn't have to work"). Jimmy decides to invite Lucy's parents (Valerie Mahaffey and Greg Germann), who are in denial of the fact that their daughter was a serial killer. When they finally do come however, the Chances are placed off guard long enough so they kidnap Hope. In revenge, Virginia knocks out Lucy's mother and takes Hope back. They later return to the Chances only to apologize for their behavior. However, when they say grace before their dinner, Lucy's parents kidnap Hope again, and are arrested.
10	10	"Burt Rocks"	Jace Alexander	Alan Kirschenbaum	November 30, 2010	1ARY10	6.65
When Barney is looking for an attraction for Grocery Palooza (he constantly insists that Lollapalooza stole the name from them), Jimmy learns that when he was a baby, Burt gave up his dream of being a Rockstar for him. Jimmy then comes up with the idea to have Smokey Floyd (Jason Lee), Burt's Rockhero, sing at Grocery Palooza, which Barney thinks is splendid. However, even though they get him, they soon find out Smokey Floyd is not all he's cracked up to be.
11	11	"Toy Story"	Michael Fresco	Bobby Bowman	December 7, 2010	1ARY09	6.92
Jimmy finds out about his father's annual Christmas scheme where he sells the most wanted toy for a lot of money, which always left Jimmy disappointed when he was a child. Virginia wants the family to be a part of the living nativity scene at their church to gain the respect of the members.
12	12	"Romeo and Romeo"	Eyal Gordin	Ralph Greene & Tim Stack	February 8, 2011	1ARY13	6.58
Jimmy makes friends with a fellow single dad named Justin, and they set up a play date with Hope and his own baby. Unfortunately, Virginia does not like the idea because she is Justin's housekeeper. However, Jimmy and Justin set out to have a dinner at the Chance household to make peace.
13	13	"A Germ of a Story"	Phil Traill	Tim Stack	February 15, 2011	1ARY11	5.36
The Chance family becomes obsessed with cleanliness and moves Maw Maw to the greenhouse; old home movies reveal what has been keeping the family healthy.
14	14	"What Up, Cuz?"	Rebecca Asher	Bobby Bowman	February 22, 2011	1ARY12	6.00
Virginia's cousin Delilah (Amy Sedaris), pays a visit to the Chance family, determined to claim her share of Maw Maw's (whom she believes died) estate. Further tension builds when Delilah admits she still has a crush on Burt.
15	15	"Snip Snip"	Chris Koch	Mike Mariano	March 1, 2011	1ARY17	8.68
The family decides Burt should get a vasectomy; Virginia and Sabrina stand off when they learn each other's secrets.
16	16	"The Cultish Personality"	Phil Traill	Matthew W. Thompson	March 8, 2011	1ARY14	6.60
Cousin Mike returns, and brings his new wife Tanya (Mary Lynn Rajskub) as well as the cult he joined with him. Burt tries to sort things out with his brother, Bruce (J.K. Simmons) so he will be proud of Mike, and Virginia stops Jimmy from getting sucked into the cult as well.
17	17	"Mongooses"	Eyal Gordin	Bobby Bowman	March 15, 2011	1ARY15	5.74
Jimmy decides to choose guardians for Hope in case he dies, which leads to everyone arguing over who could take care of her best. Sabrina is taken off guard by being put in the will, and Burt feels he could take care of her fine, but Virginia and Jimmy disagree. In the end, after everyone works together to be better people more fit to take care of a child, they have to hide from and stop Maw-Maw, when she believes there to be mongooses in the house.
18	18	"Cheaters"	Dan Attias	Elijah Aron & Jordan Young	April 19, 2011	1ARY16	5.31
Maw Maw falls for a man she meets at Shelly's day care. Meanwhile, Sabrina thinks her college boyfriend Wyatt is cheating on her.
19	19	"Sleep Training"	Eyal Gordin	Bobby Bowman & Sean Conaway	April 26, 2011	1ARY19	4.53
Hope's grandparents try to sleep-train her.
20	20	"Everybody Flirts... Sometimes"	Jerry Levine	Christine Zander	May 3, 2011	1ARY18	4.67
Burt inspires everyone to experiment with the influence of flirting, but when they cannot get the hang of it, things do not go quite right.
21	21	"Baby Monitor"	Eyal Gordin	Bobby Bowman	May 10, 2011	1ARY21	5.05
Burt and Virginia try to help a couple (Ethan Suplee and Jaime Pressly) they overheard arguing on Hope's baby monitor without letting the couple know they can hear everything in their house.
22	22	"Don't Vote for This Episode"	Greg Garcia	Greg Garcia	May 17, 2011	1ARY20	5.40
As Maw Maw and Jimmy prepare to celebrate their 86th and 24th birthdays respectively, Jimmy tells Hope about the time when he was about to turn eighteen. The flashback reveals that Jimmy used to be goth, how Maw Maw became senile, how Shelly got her dead tooth, Sabrina used to have braces and was in love with goth Jimmy, Frank was good at his job, Barney used to be obese, and the innocent comment Shelly made about a boyfriend which set Lucy down her murderous path.

== DVD release ==
The complete first season of Raising Hope was released on DVD in region 1 on September 20, 2011, in region 2 on February 20, 2012 and in region 4 on September 21, 2011. The DVD set includes all 22 episodes of season one. Special features include Commentary Track on the Pilot episode, the Unaired Network Pilot, "Adorable Stars: Meet the Hopes", "Moments with Mrs. Chance", "Taking Chances: Shooting the Season Finale", Gag Reel, and Deleted and Extended Scenes.

The extended cut of the season finale, "Don't Vote for This Episode", includes a cliffhanger that was ultimately removed - Lucy returning, having not actually died in the pilot episode, to take Hope away. The character would have then been killed for good in the second season premiere. This plot was later used for the final two episodes of the second season.

== Ratings ==
=== U.S. ===
#	Episode	Air Date	18-49 (Rating/Share)	Viewers (m)
1	"Pilot"	September 21, 2010	3.1/8	7.48
2	"Dead Tooth"	September 28, 2010	3.1/8	7.09
3	"Dream Hoarders"	October 5, 2010	2.5/7	6.18
4	"Say Cheese"	October 12, 2010	2.5/6	6.01
5	"Happy Halloween"	October 26, 2010	2.5/7	6.00
6	"Family Secrets"	October 26, 2010	2.2/6	5.37
7	"The Sniffles"	November 9, 2010	2.5/7	5.77
8	"Blue Dots"	November 16, 2010	2.7/7	5.91
9	"Meet the Grandparents"	November 23, 2010	2.5/7	5.70
10	"Burt Rocks"	November 30, 2010	2.7/7	6.65
11	"Toy Story"	December 7, 2010	2.8/8	6.92
12	"Romeo and Romeo"	February 8, 2011	2.7/7	6.58
13	"A Germ of a Story"	February 15, 2011	2.2/6	5.36
14	"What Up, Cuz?"	February 22, 2011	2.4/7	6.00
15	"Snip Snip"	March 1, 2011	3.3/9	8.68
16	"The Cultish Personality	March 8, 2011	2.7/8	6.60
17	"Mongooses"	March 15, 2011	2.2/6	5.74
18	"Cheaters"	April 19, 2011	2.1/5	5.31
19	"Sleep Training"	April 26, 2011	1.8/4	4.53
20	"Everybody Flirts... Sometimes"	May 3, 2011	1.8/5	4.67
21	"Baby Monitor"	May 10, 2011	2.0/5	5.05
22	"Don't Vote for This Episode"	May 17, 2011	2.2/6	5.40
