= Raising Hope season 2 =

Season of television series

Raising Hope
- Season 2
- No. of episodes: 22

Release
- Original network: Fox
- Original release: September 20, 2011 – April 17, 2012

Season chronology
- ← Previous; Season 1 Next → Season 3

The second season of the American television series Raising Hope premiered on September 20, 2011, on Fox. The show moved to its new time slot, airing on Tuesday at 9:30pm ET to make way for the new comedy series New Girl, before moving again to 8:00 pm ET in mid-season. This season contains 22 episodes.

== Cast ==
=== Main cast ===
- Lucas Neff as James "Jimmy" Chance
- Martha Plimpton as Virginia Chance
- Garret Dillahunt as Burt Chance
- Shannon Woodward as Sabrina Collins
- Gregg Binkley as Barney Hughes
- Cloris Leachman as Barbara June "Maw Maw" Thompson

=== Recurring cast ===
- Baylie and Rylie Cregut as Hope Chance
- Kate Micucci as Shelley
- Todd Giebenhain as Frank Marolla
- Ryan Doom as Wyatt Gill
- Bijou Phillips as Lucy Carlyle
- Eddie Steeples as Tyler, the Gas Man
- Dan Coscino as Dancin' Dan
- Carla Jimenez as Rosa Flores
- Lou Wagner as Wally Phipps

=== Recurring cast in flashback ===
- Greyson Chance as adolescent Jimmy
- Kelly Heyer as teenage Virginia
- Cameron Moulene as teenage Burt
- Laura Avey as teenage Delilah
- Trace Garcia as 4-year-old Jimmy (credited as Trace!)

=== Guest cast ===
- Stephen Root as Captain Collins
- Sean Bridgers as Jack
- Whit Hertford as Ross
- Amy Sedaris as Delilah
- Greg Germann as Dale Carlyle
- Camden Garcia as Trevor
- Shirley Jones as Christine Chance
- Lee Majors as Ralph Chance
- Ethan Suplee as Andrew
- Andrew Dice Clay as Himself
- Patton Oswalt as Rubin
- Fred Willard as Mr. Swift
- Dale Dickey as Patty
- Timothy Stack as TV's Tim Stack
- Ashley Tisdale as Mary-Louise
- Katy Perry as Rikki Hargrove
- Mary Birdsong as Mayor Suzie Hellmann
- Gary Anthony Williams as News Reporter
- Vivica A. Fox as Sarah Louise
- David Krumholtz as Carl
- Travis Van Winkle as Philip
- Desi Lydic as Uma
- Jorge Diaz as Randy
- Anthony Anderson as Neighbor
- Nancy Grace as Herself
- Jason Lee as Smokey Floyd
- Jaime Pressly as Donna
- Ed Begley, Jr. as Himself
- Jackie Hoffman as Sylvia Barnes
- Amy Hill as Judge

== Production ==
On January 10, 2011, Fox renewed Raising Hope for a second season with a 22 episode order. From the beginning of this season, Cloris Leachman and Gregg Binkley were both upgraded to series regulars. Episode four aired following The X Factor on Wednesday, October 5, 2011 at 9:30pm, instead of its regular time slot of Tuesday at 9:30pm. Production for this season ended on February 16, 2012. On March 6, 2012, the show moved to 8pm as part of the mid-season two-hour comedy block, although the last two episodes of the season were shown in the original 9:30pm time slot.

== Episodes ==
No. overall	No. in season	Title	Directed by	Written by	Original release date	Prod. code	US viewers (millions)
23	1	"Prodigy"	Eyal Gordin	Christine Zander	September 20, 2011	2ARY02	6.73
Jimmy discovers that he was a talented musician in his youth, however he was rendered talentless when he was involved in a golf putter accident. Wanting to impress Sabrina and make something out of himself for Hope, Jimmy sets out to recapture his inexplicable abilities with the help of Virginia, Burt, and Maw Maw. Guest starring: Greyson Chance as an adolescent Jimmy
24	2	"Sabrina Has Money"	Troy Miller	Michael Pennie	September 27, 2011	2ARY03	6.14
When Burt informs the family of Sabrina's secret, she introduces them to her father, Cap (Stephen Root). Meanwhile, Jimmy believes that Hope should have friends that are rich, so he asks Sabrina to allow him into her sister's party.
25	3	"Kidnapped"	Mike Mariano	Elijah Aron & Jordan Young	October 4, 2011	2ARY01	6.36
The Chance family has an unexpected visitor, when Jack (Sean Bridgers), the man who kidnapped Burt twenty years ago, shows up at their doorstep. They then realize that Burt's disappearance wasn't all it appeared to be. Meanwhile, Sabrina awaits a phone call from her boyfriend Wyatt, making Jimmy jealous.
26	4	"Henderson, Nevada-Adjacent Baby! Henderson, Nevada-Adjacent!"	Dan Attias	Alan Kirschenbaum & Mike Mariano	October 5, 2011	2ARY05	5.85
Virginia's cousin Delilah is getting married, so Virginia, Burt, Jimmy and Sabrina head to Las Vegas. Virginia is embarrassed that she didn't have a big wedding like her cousin and Jimmy uses the trip to try to get closer to Sabrina. When Burt discovers this, he, Jimmy and Sabrina all chip in to help her get the big wedding she deserved to have.
27	5	"Killer Hope"	Michael Fresco	Ralph Greene & Tim Stack	November 1, 2011	2ARY06	5.37
After discovering that Hope hit a boy at daycare, the family becomes worried that she is following in her mother's footsteps. Meanwhile, the Chances run into problems when they camp outside while their home is fumigated for termites. Only with Sabrina's help do the Chances discover that they need to help Hope express her anger in healthier ways to avoid having her follow Lucy's path of destruction.
28	6	"Jimmy and the Kid"	Eyal Gordin	Bobby Bowman	November 8, 2011	2ARY04	4.51
Jimmy goes head-to-head with a thirteen-year-old kid when he makes a run for Sabrina. Meanwhile, Maw Maw swallows her gold tooth which leaves Virginia and Burt wondering how to retrieve it.
29	7	"Burt's Parents"	Eyal Gordin	Sean Conaway	November 15, 2011	2ARY07	4.84
The Chances, along with Sabrina, borrow a house in order to impress Burt's rich parents, who have decided to visit the family for Thanksgiving. However, things go awry when the real home-owners return early, and Burt's parents realize how they really live. Guest starring: Lee Majors and Shirley Jones
30	8	"Bro-gurt"	Mike Mariano	Michael Pennie	November 29, 2011	2ARY08	5.34
Virginia encourages the family to submit their own inventions in the National Invention Convention Extravaganza, so they could win the cash prize. Burt and Andrew (Ethan Suplee) team up to create unusual flavored yogurt, while Sabrina and Jimmy create a new baby mop.
31	9	"The Men of New Natesville"	Michael Fresco	Matthew W. Thompson	December 6, 2011	2ARY09	4.57
After being encouraged to be more of a daredevil by Burt, Jimmy jumps at the chance of showing off his bolder side at a party at Frank's house. Frank and Jimmy realize they have shared a common high school bully. When they try to take him down, they realize their old bully has changed after being confronted by Virginia to change his (now her) ways.
32	10	"It's a Hopeful Life"	Tucker Gates	Ralph Greene & Tim Stack	December 13, 2011	2ARY11	4.98
In this It's a Wonderful Life themed episode, Jimmy is transported into a cinematic dreamlike state and watches on at a world where he never met Lucy. When he returns to reality he realizes that if Hope had never been born, his life wouldn't be as good. Meanwhile, Virginia, Burt and Maw Maw see a movie that bears a striking resemblance to their day-to-day lives.
33	11	"Mrs. Smartypants"	Eyal Gordin	Alan Kirschenbaum & Mike Mariano	January 17, 2012	2ARY13	5.03
When Hope shows signs of being a baby genius, the family pits themselves against one another to earn their GEDs. While attempting to secure his G.E.D., Jimmy finds out that his old high school teacher, Mr. Swift (Fred Willard), is teaching the class.
34	12	"Gambling Again"	Rebecca Asher	Deweyne LaMar Lee	January 31, 2012	2ARY10	4.62
When Burt starts gambling again to try and win back the items he lost twenty years ago, Jimmy and Virginia get addicted to gambling themselves, which causes them to forget about Shelley's play that Sabrina wrote and Hope stars in.
35	13	"Tarot Cards"	Lee Shallat Chemel	Amy Hubbs	February 7, 2012	2ARY12	4.47
Burt hires Barney to help him with his receipts during corporate tax season, and while caught up in the stress Burt accidentally makes a mean comment about Virginia's job, so she decides to change careers and become a tarot card reader. Meanwhile, Sabrina contemplates moving to Africa with Wyatt, upsetting Jimmy.
36	14	"Jimmy's Fake Girlfriend"	Rebecca Asher	Bobby Bowman	February 14, 2012	2ARY14	4.58
Jimmy's new friend (Ashley Tisdale), from an improvisational class, agrees to pretend to be his girlfriend to make Sabrina jealous. Sabrina breaks up with her boyfriend Wyatt and starts dating Jimmy.
37	15	"Sheer Madness"	Phil Traill	Story by : Josh Wolf; Teleplay by : Greg Garcia	February 21, 2012	2ARY16	4.73
Now that they're dating, Jimmy and Sabrina realize that they have been keeping secrets from each other, and decide to let their guards down and show their true selves. Meanwhile, Virginia learns that Burt has been keeping a secret from her for years.
38	16	"Single White Female Role Model"	Eyal Gordin	Bobby Bowman	March 6, 2012	2ARY19	4.74
Sabrina is arrested after participating in an Occupy Natesville protest and is sentenced to two weeks in prison. One of the prison attendants (Katy Perry) claims to be a friend from her past and will stop at nothing to make Sabrina's stay in the slammer as dreadful as possible until she remembers their childhood friendship. Meanwhile, the mayor of Natesville grants Virginia three wishes after she helps her avoid a public scandal, but when Jimmy turns down the mayor's advances, Sabrina's chances of being exonerated are put at risk.
39	17	"Spanks Butt, No Spanks"	Rebecca Asher	Michael Pennie	March 13, 2012	2ARY18	4.31
After a spout of misbehavior, Virginia and Burt try to convince Jimmy to spank Hope. Meanwhile, Virginia and Sabrina try to capture a raccoon from underneath the porch.
40	18	"Poking Holes in the Story"	Eyal Gordin	Matthew W. Thompson	March 20, 2012	2ARY15	3.78
Virginia takes a job as a live in house and child sitter to earn money for new toys and a crib for Hope, after realizing that Hope's current possessions have been recalled. Meanwhile, Jimmy pretends to be his deceased great grandfather, in order to give Maw Maw some nice memories of her married life.
41	19	"Hogging All the Glory"	Mike Mariano	Mike Mariano	March 27, 2012	2ARY20	3.81
Wanting to gain recognition for his good deeds, Burt decides to run for a position on the church council. However, his opponent (Vivica Fox) tricks him into caring for a pig that is to be given to a blind parishioner. But, when Maw Maw cooks the animal for dinner, Burt's chances of winning the election are jeopardized.
42	20	"Sabrina's New Jimmy"	Matt Shakman	Elijah Aron & Jordan Young	April 3, 2012	2ARY17	3.93
Jimmy learns that Sabrina has a new study buddy (Travis Van Winkle) and Virginia makes him think that there is more going on between them than just studying. Meanwhile, Burt becomes obsessed with a miniature statue of a woman's breasts
43	21	"Inside Probe"	Greg Garcia	Alan Kirschenbaum & Tim Stack	April 10, 2012	2ARY22	3.81
The episode is shown as a "mockumentary" as Nancy Grace investigates Hope's serial killer mother, Lucy Carlisle (Bijou Phillips), and what happened when Jimmy met Lucy years ago. The Chance family learns some shocking things about Lucy, such as she survived the execution. Notes: Greyson Chance returns as teenaged Jimmy.
44	22	"I Want My Baby Back, Baby Back, Baby Back!"	Eyal Gordin	Bobby Bowman	April 17, 2012	2ARY21	3.79
Repercussions from the investigation land the Chance family in court to keep custody of Hope. Despite the family losing custody of Hope, Lucy, while trying to kill Sabrina, is run over and killed by a tour bus. The Chance family gets Hope back.: Various characters from Season One and two return as character witnesses.; Guest Stars: Jason Lee, Jaime Pressly and Ethan Suplee make guest appearances.

== Ratings ==
=== U.S. ===
#	Episode	Air Date	18-49 (rating/share)	Viewers (m)
1	"Prodigy"	September 20, 2011	3.1/8	6.73
2	"Sabrina Has Money"	September 27, 2011	2.9/7	6.14
3	"Kidnapped"	October 4, 2011	2.9/7	6.36
4	"Henderson, Nevada-Adjacent Baby! Henderson, Nevada-Adjacent!"	October 5, 2011	2.2/6	5.85
5	"Killer Hope"	November 1, 2011	2.5/6	5.37
6	"Jimmy and the Kid"	November 8, 2011	2.1/5	4.51
7	"Burt's Parents"	November 15, 2011	2.2/5	4.84
8	"Bro-gurt"	November 29, 2011	2.4/6	5.34
9	"The Men of New Natesville"	December 6, 2011	2.2/5	4.57
10	"It's a Hopeful Life"	December 13, 2011	2.3/6	4.98
11	"Mrs. Smartypants"	January 17, 2012	2.3/6	5.03
12	"Gambling Again"	January 31, 2012	2.0/5	4.62
13	"Tarot Cards"	February 7, 2012	2.1/5	4.47
14	"Jimmy's Fake Girlfriend"	February 14, 2012	2.1/5	4.58
15	"Sheer Madness"	February 21, 2012	2.1/5	4.73
16	"Single White Female Role Model"	March 6, 2012	2.1/6	4.74
17	"Spanks Butt, No Spanks"	March 13, 2012	1.8/6	4.31
18	"Poking Holes in the Story"	March 20, 2012	1.6/5	3.78
19	"Hogging All the Glory"	March 27, 2012	1.5/5	3.81
20	"Sabrina's New Jimmy"	April 3, 2012	1.6/5	3.93
21	"Inside Probe"	April 10, 2012	1.8/5	3.81
22	"I Want My Baby Back, Baby Back, Baby Back"	April 17, 2012	1.8/5	3.79
