= Raising Hope season 3 =

Season of television series

Raising Hope
- Season 3
- No. of episodes: 22

Release
- Original network: Fox
- Original release: October 2, 2012 – March 28, 2013

Season chronology
- ← Previous; Season 2 Next → Season 4

The third season of the American television series Raising Hope premiered on October 2, 2012, on Fox. The season moved to a new time slot, airing on Tuesday at 8pm ET followed by the new comedy series Ben and Kate and The Mindy Project. This season consisted of 22 episodes.

== Cast ==
=== Main cast ===
- Lucas Neff as James "Jimmy" Chance
- Martha Plimpton as Virginia Chance
- Garret Dillahunt as Burt Chance
- Shannon Woodward as Sabrina Collins
- Gregg Binkley as Barney Hughes
- Cloris Leachman as Barbara June "Maw Maw"/Norma June Thompson

=== Recurring cast ===
- Baylie and Rylie Cregut as Hope Chance
- Kate Micucci as Shelley
- Todd Giebenhain as Frank Marolla
- Carla Jimenez as Rosa Flores
- Dan Coscino as Dancin' Dan
- Bijou Phillips as Lucy Carlyle
- Ryan Doom as Wyatt Gill
- Eddie Steeples as Tyler, the Gas Man
- Lou Wagner as Wally Phipps
- Skyler Stone as Mike Chance
- Ethan and Gavin Kent as June Bug

=== Recurring cast in flashback ===
- Trace Garcia as 5-year-old Jimmy (credited as Trace!)

=== Guest cast ===
- Melanie Griffith as Tamara Jones
- Tippi Hedren as Nana
- Jenny Slate as Joan
- David Ury as Easter Joe
- Leslie Jordan as Reverend Bob
- Wilmer Valderrama as Ricardo
- Chris Klein as Brad Jenkins
- Jeff Harlan as Bill Jenkins
- Mary Gross as Denise Jenkins
- Gary Anthony Williams as Dave Davidson
- Matthew Glave as Big W
- Leann Hunley as Francine
- Christopher Lloyd as Dennis Powers
- Whit Hertford as Ross
- Dale Dickey as Patty
- Greg Germann as Dale Carlyle
- Camden Garcia as Trevor
- Brian Doyle-Murray as Walt
- Matt Winston as Stu
- Emily Rutherfurd as Kelly
- Mike O'Malley as Jim
- Liza Snyder as Christine
- Luke Perry as the Ghost of Arbor Day
- Jason Lee as Smokey Floyd
- Jaime Pressly as Donna
- Ethan Suplee as Andrew
- Nadine Velazquez as Valentina
- Timothy Stack as TV's Tim Stack
- Hilary Duff as Rachel
- Lee Majors as Ralph Chance
- Shirley Jones as Christine Chance

== Production ==
On April 9, 2012, Fox announced that Raising Hope had been renewed for a third season. The season premiered on October 2, 2012. Melanie Griffith will recur in season three, playing the role of Tamara, Sabrina's mother and Melanie Griffith's real life mother, acclaimed Hitchcock actress Tippi Hedren plays Melanie/Tamara's on screen mother as well. Wilmer Valderrama and Leslie Jordan are set to guest star in season three, with Valderrama playing a young man who attempts to woo Sabrina's mother, and Jordan playing the role of Reverend Bob, a spiritual leader known for his unconventional methods. Jenny Slate also guest starred in two episodes as Joan, a social worker who checked on the well-being of baby Jimmy, but instead became concerned with how the family treats Maw Maw. The season premiere was released on the Raising Hope Twitter page prior to the air date. Fox ordered two more episodes of Raising Hope, bringing the third season to 24 episodes. However, these additional two episodes will now air as part of season four.

== Episodes ==
No. overall	No. in season	Title	Directed by	Written by	Original release date	Prod. code	US viewers (millions)
45	1	"Not Indecent, But Not Quite Decent Enough Proposal"	Greg Garcia	Greg Garcia	October 2, 2012	3ARY01	3.90
Sabrina's grandma dies and leaves her house to Sabrina, with a condition that she should get engaged. Jimmy decides to propose to her in a way that would be very exciting. Virginia teaches Sabrina how to fake enthusiasm.
46	2	"Throw Maw Maw from the House (Part 1)"	Eyal Gordin	Greg Garcia & Fred Shafferman	October 9, 2012	3ARY02	4.03
A social worker comes to check on the Chances and they think it's for Hope. It turns out that the complaint was about Jimmy when he was young. During the visit, the worker sees how Maw Maw is treated and decides to take her to a nursing home.
47	3	"Throw Maw Maw from the House (Part 2)"	Eyal Gordin	Elijah Aron & Jordan Young	October 16, 2012	3ARY03	4.23
The Chances and Sabrina try to sneak out Maw Maw from the nursing home, but Virginia realizes that Maw Maw is being cared for well in the home and leaves. Later Maw Maw takes some cats hostage and the Chances help. Maw Maw is sent home.
48	4	"If a Ham Falls in the Woods"	Eyal Gordin	Mark Stegemann	October 23, 2012	3ARY05	4.10
As a condition in Sabrina's grandmother's will, she and Jimmy must be married at the family church presided over by Reverend Bob (Leslie Jordan), and are required to attend the reverend's couples retreat, where they discover how little they really know about each other. Meanwhile, Barney thinks the Chances have asked him to look after Maw Maw as a ruse to set him up for a surprise 40th birthday party. He is devastated to learn it really is just a babysitting gig.
49	5	"Don't Ask, Don't Tell Me What To Do"	Eyal Gordin	Matthew W. Thompson	October 30, 2012	3ARY07	4.05
Sabrina wants to be a Surrogate for her gay best friend Jordon (Chris Eckert) and his partner (Harvey Guillén). Jimmy is not too pleased.
50	6	"What Up, Bro?"	Mike Mariano	Mike Mariano	November 13, 2012	3ARY04	3.73
When an old photo frame breaks, Virginia is forced to tell Jimmy about the time when they gave him up for adoption and then adopted him back. He traces his almost-brother Brad (Chris Klein) and wonders if he would have been better-off with the adoptive parents. Virginia and Burt also try to find out what they did right. Finally Jimmy realizes that his parents are better and tries not be a lazy parent with Hope.
51	7	"Candy Wars"	Michael Fresco	Ralph Greene & Fred Schafferman	November 20, 2012	3ARY09	3.57
It's Radish Day in Natesville. The annual candy fundraiser for the parade begins, with the prize of riding the Pilgrim Float at stake, and Jimmy wants Hope to win. Virginia then tells about the time they helped Jimmy win by cheating using Maw Maw's secret candy recipe, which started a war with Rosa. Jimmy then uses the same strategy and re-opens the previous war.
52	8	"The Walk for the Runs"	Rebecca Asher	Joey Gutierrez	November 27, 2012	3ARY06	3.87
Barney wants all his employees to join him in a walk-a-thon to raise awareness about ABS (Angry Bowel Syndrome). Jimmy is the only one who supports him, because he suffered from JABS (Juvenile ABS), due to his parents continually bickering. Sabrina gets into an argument with Wyatt, her ex-boy friend, about old gifts. Virginia and Burt worry that they are growing old, and start trying to act young.
53	9	"Squeak Means Squeak"	Lee Shallat Chemel	Stephnie Weir	December 4, 2012	3ARY10	3.66
Burt and Virginia try to fix a squirrel they believe is raping other female squirrels in the neighborhood. Jimmy wants Sabrina to do the boring parenting stuff with Hope, and not just the fun stuff. She gets good at it and Hope calls her "Mom" for the first time. Jimmy wants to prove that he is not too sensitive, and joins the Natesville Auxiliary Police with Barney. --- Guest starring: Christopher Reed as a Sons of Anarchy member
54	10	"The Last Christmas"	Greg Garcia	Greg Garcia	December 11, 2012	3ARY08	4.03
Virginia believes that the world is going to end on December 21, 2012. She has prepared for it for three years. Jimmy thinks that she is crazy, but Burt asks him to play along. Maw Maw wants to finish her bucket-list. Jimmy wants Hope to have a perfect Christmas, and Virginia's craziness is hindering that. December 21 arrives and nothing happens. Jimmy teases Virginia, but her obsessive planning and stockpiling finally finds its use.
55	11	"Credit Where Credit is Due"	Eyal Gordin	Paul A. Kaplan & Mark Torgove	January 8, 2013	3ARY11	3.74
While trying to buy a new car, Jimmy is told by the dealership salesman that he has the worst credit rating he's ever seen. Jimmy discovers his parents bought a bunch of expensive items on credit (in his name) when he was a child, and never paid, and that this is the reason they pay cash for everything now. Feeling bad, Virginia and Burt give their car to Jimmy, then purchase a used DeLorean sports car. Jimmy and his parents then go to extreme lengths to convince the original credit officer (Christopher Lloyd) to erase Jimmy's credit history.
56	12	"Lord of the Ring"	Dan Attias	Timothy Stack	January 15, 2013	3ARY12	3.63
Burt tells Jimmy that he needs to buy Sabrina a nice engagement ring, even if she claims she doesn't need one, so Jimmy starts volunteering for a series of exotic medical experiments to come up with the cash. Meanwhile Virginia has been pawning her engagement ring for years behind Burt's back to pay for odds and ends. But when Jimmy visits the pawnshop and falls in love with his own mom's ring, her secret may be out.
57	13	"What Happens at Howdy's Doesn't Stay at Howdy's"	Eyal Gordin	Gina Gari	January 22, 2013	3ARY13	4.00
Jimmy and Sabrina both have their bachelor and bachelorette parties, and Jimmy's is filmed resulting in a 'Jackass' type of setting.
58	14	"Modern Wedding"	Rebecca Asher	Sean Conaway	January 29, 2013	3ARY14	3.84
Sabrina's mother hires the camera crew of Modern Family to record her daughter's marriage to Jimmy. Mishaps threaten the ceremony, as Lucy (who is still alive) tries to sabotage the wedding, and Reverend Bob refusing to marry them because years ago Maw Maw faked her death as a way to stop giving Reverend Bob singing lessons. Burt and Virginia step in to try and save the day while attempting to keep Jimmy and Sabrina in the dark. Guest starring: Bijou Phillips as Lucy Carlyle, Greg Germann as Dale Carlyle
59	15	"Yo Zappa Do (Part 1)"	Eyal Gordin	Amy Hubbs	January 29, 2013	3ARY15	3.32
Barney's wedding gift to Jimmy and Sabrina is plane tickets for the family to fly to Los Angeles for a taping of Hope's favorite TV show, Yo Zappa Do! But Jimmy's fear of flying turns it into a road trip. The show's star, Trevor (Camden Garcia), turns out to be a former, albeit young, adversary of Jimmy's, and Barney's ex step-son. Meanwhile, Ricardo (Wilmer Valderrama) is back as Burt's and Virginia's house guest, and he does all he can to make the living arrangement more permanent.
60	16	"Yo Zappa Do (Part 2)"	Lee Shallat Chemel	Jordan Young & Elijah Aron	February 5, 2013	3ARY16	3.87
Hope has been recruited into the Yo Zappa Do! taping, as well as a reluctant Jimmy, but Trevor makes sure that Jimmy never gets too comfortable on the set. Burt proposes a new landscaping idea to the studio head (Brian Doyle-Murray). Meanwhile, Maw Maw enlists Barney in her scheme to track down the woman who had an affair with her late husband. Finding that the woman died, Maw Maw then tries to get even by sleeping with her still-alive husband. While charged with keeping the couple's granddaughter (Emily Rutherfurd) out of the way, Barney falls for her despite her odd physical trait.
61	17	"Sex, Clown and Videotape"	Rebecca Asher	Deweyne LaMar Lee	February 5, 2013	3ARY17	3.53
Burt and Virginia go to extreme lengths to recover an antique clown doll, upon remembering that they had hidden their sex tape in it, but find the tape is missing. The two track down the couple (Mike O'Malley and Liza Snyder) who last owned the doll, and discover that the tape has changed the couple's life. Meanwhile, Sabrina tries to help Jimmy finally cure his sleepwalking problems, which he's had since childhood.
62	18	"Arbor Daze"	Eyal Gordin	Ralph Greene & Timothy Stack	February 19, 2013	3ARY18	3.65
Burt and Virginia reveal their odd Arbor Day tradition of uprooting newly-planted trees, hanging small gifts on them for Jimmy, then burning the trees. A shocked Sabrina refuses to let Jimmy carry on the tradition with Hope.
63	19	"Making the Band"	Mike Mariano	Sean Conaway	February 26, 2013	3ARY19	3.53
Jimmy's plans to throw a spectacular birthday party for Hope go awry, but Burt brings in his old bandmate Smokey Floyd (Jason Lee) and a slew of odd Natesville residents (played by former My Name Is Earl cast members Ethan Suplee, Jaime Pressly, Eddie Steeples, Nadine Velazquez and Timothy Stack) to save the event.
64	20	"The Old Girl"	Eyal Gordin	Joey Gutierrez	February 26, 2013	3ARY20	3.12
Sabrina befriends a woman named Rachel (Hilary Duff), who turns out to be the girl that broke Jimmy's heart several years earlier.
65	21	"Burt Mitzvah – The Musical"	Eyal Gordin	Paul A. Kaplan & Mark Torgove	March 28, 2013	3ARY21	4.16
Burt's mother (Shirley Jones) and father (Lee Majors) arrive with a surprising announcement that Burt has Jewish ancestry on his mother's side. Burt fully embraces his new Jewishness, with Virginia, Jimmy and Sabrina eventually getting into the act, and he agrees to his parents' request that he have a bar mitzvah. But when the actual day of the event arrives, Burt discovers a scheme by his parents.
66	22	"Mother's Day"	Rick Kelly	Greg Garcia	March 28, 2013	3ARY22	3.28
When Jimmy shows Virginia a macaroni necklace that he plans to have Hope give to Sabrina for Mother's Day, Virginia is upset because she did most of the child-rearing for Hope before Jimmy and Sabrina were a couple. Sabrina is trying to locate her own mother, who is currently traveling somewhere in the Far East. Meanwhile, Burt and Barney go to the house where Maw Maw grew up to take photos that might jar Maw Maw's memory of her mother. When they arrive, they make a shocking discovery.

== Ratings ==
=== U.S. ===
#	Episode	Air date	18-49 (rating/share)	Viewers (m)
1	"Not Indecent, But Not Quite Decent Enough Proposal"	October 2, 2012	1.7/5	3.90
2	"Throw Maw Maw from the House (Part 1)"	October 9, 2012	1.8/5	4.03
3	"Throw Maw Maw from the House (Part 2)"	October 16, 2012	1.7/5	4.23
4	"If A Ham Falls In The Woods"	October 23, 2012	1.7/5	4.10
5	"Don't Ask, Don't Tell Me What To Do"	October 30, 2012	1.7/5	4.05
6	"What Up, Bro?"	November 13, 2012	1.6/5	3.73
7	"Candy Wars"	November 20, 2012	1.5/5	3.57
8	"The Walk for the Runs"	November 27, 2012	1.8/5	3.87
9	"Squeak Means Squeak"	December 4, 2012	1.4/4	3.66
10	"The Last Christmas"	December 11, 2012	1.7/5	4.03
11	"Credit Where Credit is Due"	January 8, 2013	1.7/5	3.74
12	"Lord of the Ring"	January 15, 2013	1.6/5	3.63
13	"What Happens at Howdy's Doesn't Stay at Howdy's"	January 22, 2013	1.7/5	4.00
14	"Modern Wedding"	January 29, 2013	1.7/5	3.84
15	"Yo Zappa Do (Part 1)"	January 29, 2013	1.6/4	3.32
16	"Yo Zappa Do (Part 2)"	February 5, 2013	1.6/5	3.87
17	"Sex, Clown and Videotape"	February 5, 2013	1.5/4	3.53
18	"Arbor Daze"	February 19, 2013	1.5/4	3.65
19	"Making The Band"	February 26, 2013	1.5/4	3.53
20	"The Old Girl"	February 26, 2013	1.4/4	3.12
21	"Burt Mitzvah – The Musical"	March 28, 2013	1.3/4	4.16
22	"Mother's Day"	March 28, 2013	1.2/3	3.28
