= Burt Rocks (Raising Hope) =

- Raising Hope episode
- Episode no.: Season 1 Episode 10
- Directed by: Jace Alexander
- Written by: Alan Kirschenbaum
- Original air date: November 30, 2010

Guest appearance
- Jason Lee as Smokey Floyd

Episode chronology
← Previous "Meet the Grandparents"	Next → "Toy Story"

"Burt Rocks" is the tenth episode of the first season of the American sitcom Raising Hope. Written by Alan Kirschenbaum and directed by Jace Alexander, the episode first aired in the United States on November 30, 2010 on Fox. This is the first episode so far where Maw Maw hasn't appeared.

In the episode, Jimmy learns that as a baby he ruined Burt's dream of becoming a rock star. He decides to make up for it by inviting Smokey Floyd (Jason Lee) to perform at Grocery Palooza

== Plot ==
When Barney is looking for an attraction for Grocery Palooza (which he constantly insists that Lollapalooza stole the name from them) Jimmy learns that when he was a baby, Burt gave up his dream of being a Rockstar for him. Jimmy then comes up with the idea to have Smokey Floyd, Burt's Rockhero, sing at Grocery Palooza, which Barney thinks is splendid. However, even though they get him, they soon find out Smokey Floyd is not all he's cracked up to be.

== Production ==
The episode was written by Alan Kirschenbaum, his first writing credit for the series. The episode was also directed by Jace Alexander, his second directing credit for the series after "Meet the Grandparents".

The episode also guest starred Jason Lee who had previously worked with Greg Garcia on My Name Is Earl. Initially the producers were looking for an actual musician to play Smokey Floyd, but many had turned it down due to the "unflattering" nature of the character. They eventually turned the character into a fictional one and initially thought of Jason Lee. Lucas Neff, who plays Jimmy said in an interview that "They have such a rapport. Greg lets Jason just go and Jason just improvises half of the scene. They're bouncing ideas off of each other and the scene is constantly changing," Jason had to wear makeup for the role to make him look older than he is.

== Cultural references ==
When Smokey Floyd gets up on stage, he mistakenly calls Barney 'Kenny'. Kenny was the name of the character that actor Gregg Binkley played in My Name Is Earl, which also starred Jason Lee and is another comedy also created by Greg Garcia.

== Reception ==
In its original American broadcast on November 30, 2010, "Burt Rocks" was viewed by 6.878 million viewers and received a 2.7 rating/7% share among adults between the ages of 18 and 49 coming third in its timeslot and received an 8% rise from the previous episode.
