= Blue Dots =

- Raising Hope episode
- Episode no.: Season 1 Episode 8
- Directed by: Eyal Gordin
- Written by: Liz Astrof
- Cinematography by: Walt Fraser
- Editing by: William Marrinson
- Production code: 1ARY07
- Original air date: November 16, 2010
- Running time: 21mm 32s

Guest appearances
- Cloris Leachman - Maw Maw; Kate Micucci - Shelley; Lou Wagner - Wally Phipps

Episode chronology
← Previous "The Sniffles"	Next → "Meet the Grandparents"

"Blue Dots" is the eighth episode of the first season of the American sitcom Raising Hope. The episode was written by Liz Astrof, her first for the series, and was directed by Eyal Gordin. The episode premiered November 16, 2010 on the Fox Broadcasting Company. The plot follows Jimmy' attempt to get Hope into a better daycare, the revelation that Burt is a sex offender, and the rest of the family becoming sex offenders from the resulting attempt to get Burt's conviction overturned.

The episode featured actresses Kate Micucci and Cloris Leachman in their recurring roles, and the first appearance of Lou Wagner as lawyer Wally Phipps. Critics gave mixed reviews, but praised the performance of Garret Dillahunt and the use of a non-typical plot device. According to Nielsen Media Research, it was watched by 5.9 million households in its original airing, reversing a downward trend in ratings in the last two episodes.

== Plot ==
Shelly (Kate Micucci) is serenading the dogs at her daycare when Virginia (Martha Plimpton) arrives with Hope Chance. Shelly remarks that she got her dead tooth fixed after seeing a character with one on It's Always Sunny in Philadelphia made her no longer feel unique. Virginia asks about the lack of babies or old people at the daycare, with Shelly confirming that Hope is the only non-dog left in the daycare. Later that day with most of the family sitting around the dinner table, Maw Maw (Cloris Leachman) rings the doorbell twice and to the family's concern, Hope barks at the noise each time.

Virginia gets a brochure for a different pre-school across the other side of town that offers scholarships and the family arrange to go to a meeting there to hear about the application process. While at the meeting, another parent mentions that a sex offender lives near the pre-school, highlighted by a blue dot on a Megan's Law website. The pre-school employee explains that they made the sex offender move, and now the next nearest is over the other side of the town, with the Chance family shocked when they find out the offender is in their neighborhood. They get home, and Jimmy (Lucas Neff) looks it up on the internet, finding out that the registered sex offender is in fact Burt (Garret Dillahunt), caused by a charge made when he was 17 and hooked up with Virginia when she was 15.

They decide to go to a lawyer, Wally Phipps (Lou Wagner) they saw on TV in order to clear Burt's name. When they meet they discover that Burt needs to go house to house around the neighborhood to inform all of his neighbors that he is a sex offender while Wally tries to get the judgement overturned. Meanwhile, Sabrina (Shannon Woodward) helps Jimmy with the written application for the day care, loudly criticizing his over-use of exclamation mark. At the court house, the whole family is there to see Burt cleared and removed from the sex offender list, only for Maw Maw to expose herself in front of a group of school children, causing the briefly removed blue dot to be replaced following her charge for indecent exposure.

Wally helps Maw Maw to get twelve hours of community service on account of her being crazy, but Virginia explains that she's never lucid that long. Wally explains that all that's required is for a woman to do the time, at which point both Jimmy and Burt look at Virginia. The following morning, Jimmy gives Virginia an early morning lift to do the community service when they stop so that Virginia can use a gas station toilet. When the gas station attendant refuses to let her use the toilet without purchasing something, she goes around the side of the station to relieve herself when the headlights on a police car come on, and two officers arrest Virginia for indecent exposure. Jimmy, desperate to find someone to do Maw Maw's community service, offers to pay a prostitute to do the time only for it to be a police trap, and for him to be arrested for solicitation and placed in the back of the police car next to Virginia.

Having been bailed out, Jimmy is back at home frantically working on the application when Hope crawls up chewing on a bone. He realizes that he needs to spice up the application. He goes to the new pre-school and after the employee reads out all the other applicants problems, he awards the scholarship to Hope, saying that Jimmy was a promising artist whose hand was injured in the war in Afghanistan while dragging orphans to safety. Jimmy feels so guilty about taking the spot that he admits his lie, and the other applicants all come out and admit that they lied on their application too. They're all turned down for the new daycare, but Jimmy tells them all about Shelley's daycare and they enroll their children, meaning that Hope is no longer the only baby.

== Reception ==
=== Ratings ===
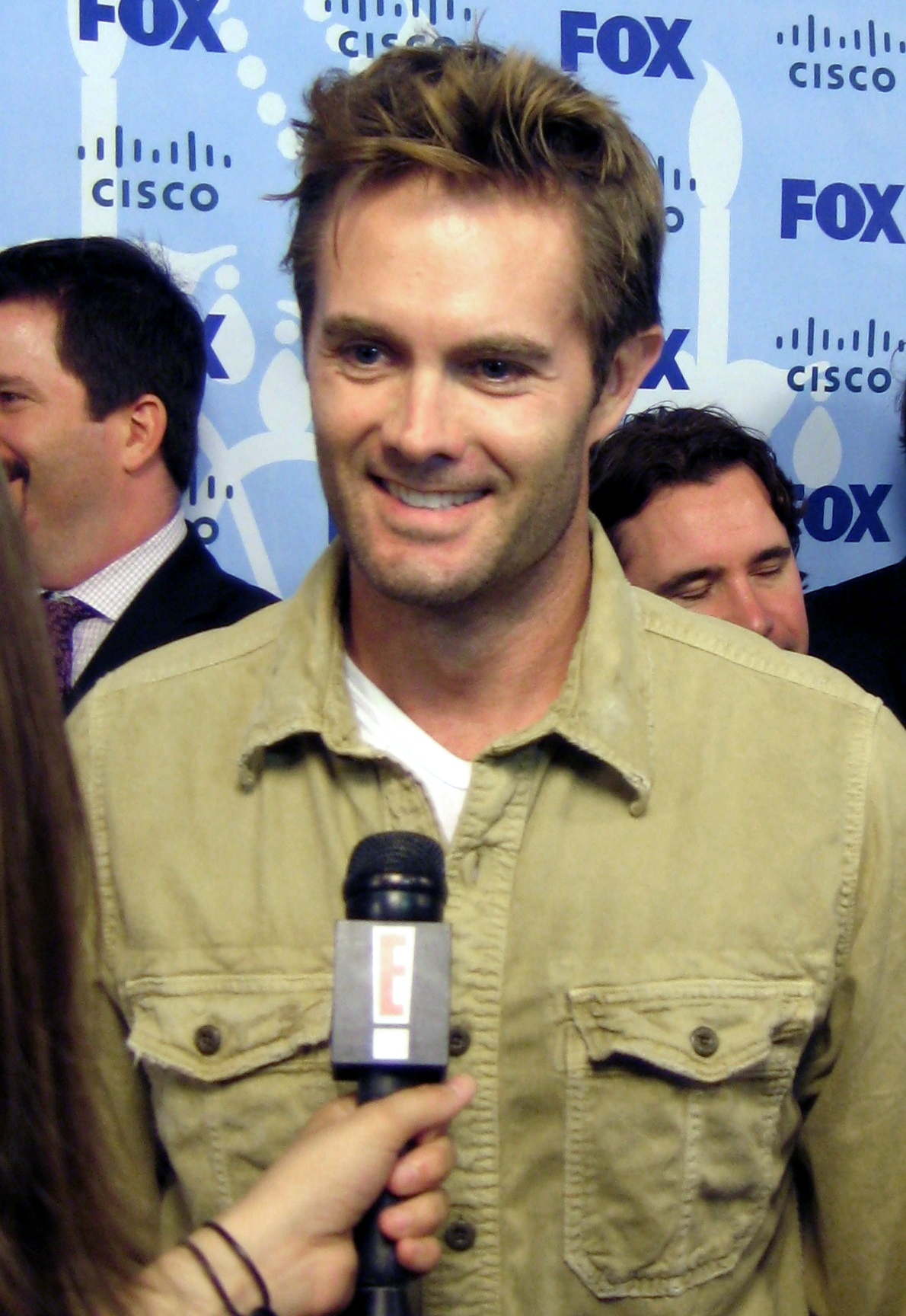
Garret Dillahunt's performance was described by critics as "just hilarious"

In its original American broadcast on November 16, 2010, "Blue Dots" was watched by 5.9 million households, according to Nielson ratings. Its ratings were higher than the previous two episodes, "Family Secrets" and "The Sniffles". "Blue Dots" received a 2.5/7 share among viewers aged between 18 and 34, and a 2.7/7 share among viewers aged between 18 and 49.

=== Reviews ===
John Kubicek at BuddyTV said that although the episode used a non-typical plot device in the form of sex offenders, the series "continued to prove that it's one of the funniest shows on TV". Andrea Evans on The Game Effect criticised the animation effect used to make Hope look like she was barking and described the episode as "meh", but appreciated the continuity in Jimmy's character arc and described Garret Dillahunt as "just hilarious as Burt"; and gave the episode an overall rating of 8 out of 10. At Gather.com, Elizabeth SanFilippo said that the show had previously embraced storylines that if done badly could easily offend. In "Blue Dots", the writers moved towards that line once again but kept it on the side of funny.
