= Raising Hope season 4 =

Season of television series

Raising Hope
- Season 4
- No. of episodes: 22

Release
- Original network: Fox
- Original release: November 15, 2013 – April 4, 2014

Season chronology
- ← Previous; Season 3

The fourth and final season of the American television series Raising Hope premiered on November 15, 2013, on Fox. The program moved to a new time slot this season, airing on Friday at 9:00 pm ET followed by the comedy series Enlisted. It later moved to 9:30 pm, swapping time slots with Enlisted. The season consisted of 22 episodes.

On March 10, 2014, Fox canceled Raising Hope. The series finale aired April 4, 2014 as the back-to-back episodes aired the night.

== Cast ==
=== Main cast ===
- Lucas Neff as James "Jimmy" Chance
- Martha Plimpton as Virginia Chance
- Garret Dillahunt as Burt Chance
- Shannon Woodward as Sabrina Collins
- Gregg Binkley as Barney Hughes
- Cloris Leachman as Barbara June "Maw Maw" Thompson

=== Recurring cast ===
- Baylie and Rylie Cregut as Hope Chance (born Princess Beyonce Carlyle)
- Kate Micucci as Shelley
- Todd Giebenhain as Frank Marolla
- Carla Jimenez as Rosa Flores
- Dan Coscino as Dancin' Dan
- Eddie Steeples as Tyler, the Gas Man
- Lou Wagner as Wally Phipps

=== Recurring cast in flashback ===
- Kelly Heyer as teenage Virginia
- Corey Eid as teenage Burt
- Trace Garcia as 6-year-old Jimmy (credited as Trace!)
- Desiree Cooper as 10-year-old Virginia

=== Guest cast ===
- Jeffrey Tambor as Arnold
- Bernie Kopell as Charles
- Molly Shannon as Maxine
- Mindy Sterling as Prosecutor
- Diedrich Bader as Gary
- Mary Birdsong as Mayor Suzie Hellmann
- Gary Anthony Williams as Dave Davidson
- Amy Sedaris as Delilah
- Augusta Mariano as Ashley
- Lee Majors as Ralph Chance
- Shirley Jones as Christine Chance
- Brigitte Nielsen as Svetlana
- Nick Gracer as Sergei
- Jeremy Guskin as Maxim
- Keith Carradine as Colt Palomino
- Tommy Chong as Hubert
- Judith Light as Louise
- Mike O'Malley as Jim
- Michael Rapaport as Michael
- Lesley Nicol as Eleanor
- Michael Bowen as Mullet
- Kenny Loggins as Himself

== Production ==
On March 4, 2013, Raising Hope was renewed for a fourth season. The additional two episodes that were ordered for season three instead aired as part of season four. This season was announced to premiere in late fall and air alongside the new series Enlisted, in the new timeslot of Fridays at 9:00 pm following Bones. On September 12, 2013, Fox announced that Enlisted would premiere in January instead of November and that Raising Hope would have back-to-back episodes in the fall. On October 21, 2013, Fox announced that the season premiere of Raising Hope would be delayed a week. On March 10, 2014, Fox announced that they canceled Raising Hope; making its fourth season the final season. The series finale aired April 4, 2014.

== Episodes ==
No. overall	No. in season	Title	Directed by	Written by	Original release date	Prod. code	US viewers (millions)
67	1	"Déjà Vu Man"	Mike Mariano	Mike Mariano	November 15, 2013	4ARY01	2.38
Virginia discovers that the "Déjà Vu Man" (a man who spies her and her family) is her real father.
68	2	"Burt Bucks"	Rebecca Asher	Joey Gutierrez	November 15, 2013	4ARY02	2.03
Burt and Virginia graft a scheme to set up a barter system in Natesville after Burt receives a lobster for some work he did. Meanwhile Jimmy is mocked by a co-worker after Sabrina saves his life.
69	3	"Ship Happens"	David Katzenberg	Sean Conaway	November 22, 2013	4ARY03	2.45
Sabrina is desperate to give Hope a good vacation as Virginia and Burt gave Jimmy fake vacations. They all end up towing a boat to the river for someone, as it's the only way they can afford a road trip. But once their car is stolen, Sabrina takes matters into her own hands. Meanwhile Jimmy is shocked by a stuffed animal museum.
70	4	"Hi-Def"	Mike Mariano	Matthew W. Thompson	November 22, 2013	3ARY24	2.25
Sabrina and Jimmy compete over gaining followers and making videos on Wiki Vids. Meanwhile Virginia and Burt are worried about their health so they visit the Doctor. Virginia's glasses ruin their sex life and Burt must have a camera fitted up his prostate.
71	5	"Extreme Howdy's Makeover"	Jay Karas	Matthew W. Thompson	November 29, 2013	4ARY05	1.74
Maxine (Molly Shannon) arrives to "Maxinemise" Howdy's and ends up firing Barney. Meanwhile Virginia and Burt try to stop Jimmy from competing in the art show.
72	6	"Adoption"	Rebecca Asher	Elijah Aron & Jordan Young	November 29, 2013	4ARY04	1.63
After officially adopting Hope, Sabrina is thrown a re-birthing ceremony by Jimmy and his friends, due to the fact that there was no big deal made about the adoption. Meanwhile, Virginia and Burt must prove a defendant is innocent, after the real lawyer, Wally Phipps, collapses in court.
73	7	"Murder, She Hoped"	Rebecca Asher	Audra Sielaff & Becky Mann	December 6, 2013	4ARY08	2.74
In a parody of Hitchcock's Rear Window, Burt suspects that the Chances' new back-fence neighbour, Gary (Diedrich Bader), has murdered his wife.
74	8	"Dysfunction Function"	Rick Kelly	Mark Stegemann	December 6, 2013	4ARY07	2.13
Burt and Virginia misread clues that make them think Jimmy and Sabrina's sex life is lacking, so they make several secretive attempts to spice it up. When all else fails, they call in Wyatt, Sabrina's ex.
75	9	"The Chance Who Stole Christmas"	Mike Mariano	Dave Holstein	December 13, 2013	4ARY10	2.10
Mayor Hellmann is sent to rehab, and Burt runs for Mayor so that he can give Virginia the honor of lighting the town Christmas tree. But after Burt discovers that there is not enough funding for the Natesville Community Pool, he decides he must cancel the Christmas Celebrations.
76	10	"Bee Story"	Ken Whittingham	Mark Torgove & Paul A. Kaplan	December 13, 2013	4ARY06	1.91
After the death of several bees, Burt and Virginia lie their way into working for the kazoo company that supposedly killed the bees, in order to gain evidence. But each eventually becomes attached to the company. Meanwhile, Jimmy is upset by the protest that Sabrina has organised against the company. Barney and Frank clash with the protestors, due to their love for the company's kazoos. Meanwhile, it is revealed what Maw Maw does every week whilst the Chances are fooling around, watching Breaking Bad.
77	11	"Hey There, Delilah"	Jeffrey Walker	Timothy Stack	January 10, 2014	4ARY09	2.70
Virginia's cousin and rival, Delilah, returns with an impressive story about business success. But it turns out she is broke, and is only trying to trick Maw Maw into signing over her will to her. A lucid Maw Maw sets up a competition wherein the first cousin to treat the other badly will be written out of her will, but it is really a ruse set up to make Virginia accept a promotion at her house cleaning job that she initially didn't want.
78	12	"Hot Dish"	Rebecca Asher	Kevin Henderson	January 17, 2014	4ARY11	2.50
Virginia offers to give Sabrina some much-needed cooking lessons. But when Jimmy proclaims that his wife's casserole is better than his mom's, it brings out Virginia's competitive side and she enters herself and Sabrina in the Hot Dish competition at the Radish Festival. Thinking the tension between mother and daughter-in-law will be eased if they both lose, Burt invites his mother (guest star Shirley Jones) to also enter the contest.
79	13	"Thrilla in Natesvilla"	Rick Kelly	Shelly Gossman	January 24, 2014	4ARY12	2.35
After seeing how Virginia and Burt act at dinner and never fight, Maxine pays to observe their life so that she and Barney can be the ideal couple like them. But Burt and Virginia soon argue over how to use the money. Meanwhile, Jimmy and Sabrina realize they have no real activities together, so they take up fencing.
80	14	"The Road to Natesville"	Rebecca Asher	Mark Stegemann	January 31, 2014	3ARY23	1.85
The international grocery games have come to Natesville, with many of the town's residents hosting members of the heavily favored Russian team. Barney discovers the U.S. team doping, and decides it's his duty to put another team together. Barney and Virginia see that Burt is a natural at many grocery store tasks, but Burt is reluctant to compete because of a past secret.
81	15	"Anniversary Ball"	Timothy Stack	Mike Mariano	February 7, 2014	4ARY13	1.68
When Burt starts explaining his absences with "double excuses", Virginia says it's a telltale sign that he's lying and suspects Burt's old gambling habit has resurfaced. Later, Virginia thinks Burt is lying to hide an anniversary gift he's gotten for her. But the real secret is that he's discovered a lump on his testicle and doesn't want to worry Virginia about it. Meanwhile, in trying to trap Burt into admitting he's gambling again, Barney catches the gambling bug himself and loses the store to Frank.
82	16	"The One Where They Get High"	Victor Nelli, Jr.	Joey Gutierrez	February 28, 2014	4ARY14	1.80
Burt's habit of never refusing a dare, no matter the danger, is revealed to stem from a long ago dare to climb to the top of the town's radio tower, which he refused at the time to the ridicule of his and Virginia's friends. When he agrees to ascend the tower with Virginia, they are surprisingly joined by Jimmy and Sabrina, who have determined their home life is lame. Meanwhile, Maw Maw has found a new love interest in an old stoner named Hubert (Tommy Chong).
83	17	"Baby Phat"	Garret Dillahunt	Mark Stegemann	March 7, 2014	4ARY15	1.58
Barney invites Burt and Virginia to a "weekend retreat", but it turns out to be a fat farm and he only brought them (along with doctored "before" photos) to inspire the other guests. Sabrina and Jimmy both agree that they'd like to have a child of their own, and they try to time their sexual activity to Sabrina's current cycle, as she insists on a November baby. Unfortunately, they are stuck watching Maw Maw while Jimmy's parents are away, and she constantly interrupts them. Later, Frank arrives and does the same.
84	18	"Dinner With Tropes"	Rebecca Asher	Mark Torgove & Paul A. Kaplan	March 14, 2014	4ARY16	1.42
Virginia and Burt are determined to finally perform their duet at a local telethon, but Virginia is being groomed for the role of assistant regional sales manager and has to spend a lot of time partying with her would-be boss (Judith Light). Meanwhile, Sabrina and Jimmy get worried when Hope isn't sad over the death of her pet fish.
85	19	"Para-Natesville Activity"	Melissa Kosar	Jordan Young & Elijah Aron	March 21, 2014	4ARY17	1.38
Virginia questions her beliefs when a ghost appears in their house; Burt realizes that Jim Hughes (Mike O'Malley) has been living in their bomb shelter.
86	20	"Man's Best Friend"	Richie Keen	Ralph Greene	March 28, 2014	4ARY18	1.53
Sabrina thinks Burt and Virginia should adopt a dog to get over their "empty nest" syndrome. A volunteer at the dog pound named Michael (Michael Rapaport) won't let them own a dog until he conducts a three-day trial in their home. Meanwhile, Jimmy tries to prove he can still attract women after Sabrina suggests women only flirt with him while he's with Hope.
87	21	"How I Met Your Mullet"	Rick Kelly	Timothy Stack & Matthew W. Thompson	April 4, 2014	4ARY19	1.60
Jimmy and Sabrina find a maid in the house who used to work for Sabrina's grandmother, just now returning to work after surgery. While they debate how to confess that they cannot afford her, the two learn that Sabrina's "Nanna" set up a trust so that the maid could work there for life. Virginia gets a promotion at work that allows Burt the freedom to pursue his passion. After several failed attempts, including a stint as a bounty hunter, Burt realizes that landscaping really is his passion.
88	22	"The Father/Daughter Dance"	Mike Mariano	Mike Mariano	April 4, 2014	4ARY20	1.52
Virginia's dad (Jeffrey Tambor) returns to Natesville with a surprise for his daughter and Burt that includes the wedding ceremony they never had, complete with a performance by Kenny Loggins.

== Ratings ==
=== U.S. ===
No.	Episode	Air Date	18-49 (Rating/Share)	Viewers (millions)
1	"Déjà Vu Man"	November 15, 2013	0.8/3	2.38
2	"Burt Bucks"	November 15, 2013	0.7/2	2.03
3	"Ship Happens"	November 22, 2013	0.8/3	2.45
4	"Hi-Def"	November 22, 2013	0.8/2	2.25
5	"Extreme Howdy's Makeover"	November 29, 2013	0.6/2	1.74
6	"Adoption"	November 29, 2013	0.6/2	1.63
7	"Murder, She Hoped"	December 6, 2013	0.8/2	2.74
8	"DysfunctionFunction"	December 6, 2013	0.7/2	2.13
9	"The Chance Who Stole Christmas"	December 13, 2013	0.7/2	2.10
10	"Bee Story"	December 13, 2013	0.6/2	1.91
11	"Hey There, Delilah"	January 10, 2014	0.8/2	2.70
12	"Hot Dish"	January 16, 2014	0.7/2	2.50
13	"Thrilla in Natesvilla"	January 24, 2014	0.8/2	2.35
14	"Road to Natesville"	January 31, 2014	0.6/2	1.85
15	"Anniversary Ball"	February 7, 2014	0.6/2	1.68
16	"The One Where They Get High"	February 28, 2014	0.6/2	1.80
17	"Baby Phat"	March 7, 2014	0.5/2	1.58
18	"Dinner With Tropes"	March 14, 2014	0.5/2	1.42
19	"Para-Natesville Activity"	March 21, 2014	0.4/1	1.38
20	"Man's Best Friend"	March 28, 2014	0.5/2	1.53
21	"How I Met Your Mullet"	April 4, 2014	0.6/2	1.60
22	"The Father Daughter Dance"	April 4, 2014	0.6/2	1.52
