= Dead Tooth =

- Raising Hope episode
- Episode no.: Season 1 Episode 2
- Directed by: Michael Fresco
- Written by: Greg Garcia
- Original air date: September 28, 2010

Episode chronology
← Previous "Pilot"	Next → "Dream Hoarders"

"Dead Tooth" is the second episode of the first season of the American sitcom Raising Hope. The episode was written by series creator Greg Garcia and directed by Michael Fresco. The episode premiered September 28, 2010, on the Fox Broadcasting Company.

In the episode, Jimmy searches for a daycare center for Hope. Through Sabrina, he discovers that Shelley (Kate Micucci), whom he had previously hooked up with, runs a daycare center.

"Dead Tooth" received mixed reviews from critics. According to the Nielsen Media Research, it was watched by 7.09 million viewers.

== Plot ==
Jimmy is trying to make strides as Hope's father but he then remembers he has a job and doesn't know how he'll look after Hope while working. As Jimmy works with his dad, his mom also has a full time job and Maw Maw is too demented to care for herself, let alone anyone else, Jimmy opts to take Hope to work with him and Burt. however, a nosy bystander becomes concerned for Hope's safety and calls the police. Jimmy resolves to find daycare for Hope.

Later, Jimmy, Virginia and Hope are shopping and Jimmy talks with Sabrina again, trying to make a good impression. This fails when Virginia arrives and embarrasses him but Virginia takes the opportunity to ask Sabrina if she does any babysitting. Sabrina states she does not but points the Chances in the direction of her cousin, Shelley (Kate Micucci), who runs a daycare out of her family's home. Jimmy goes to meet her and discovers she is a girl he made out with at a party two years prior, having blown her off because she has a dead tooth at the front of her mouth. Shelley is still smitten with Jimmy and he exploits the fact to get free childcare. Despite this, he still seeks to impress Sabrina and invites her over to his house when Shelley insists on having a movie night. Sabrina soon arrives with her boyfriend, putting a damper on Jimmy's plan. Jimmy later confesses to Shelley that he is not interested in her romantically but begs her to keep babysitting Hope as she is the only one Hope likes. Shelley agrees but decides to charge Jimmy $60 a week. He agrees.

Meanwhile, after Jimmy demands his family stop smoking around Hope, Burt resolves to get Maw Maw to quit smoking in order to get Virginia to quit. At first, he suffers multiple cigarette burns when he attempts to convince her and then tries to build her a bubble to smoke in. Finally, during one of her lucid moments, Maw Maw reveals she had quit smoking in 1971, the day Virginia was born, and Burt agrees to keep her from smoking in the future. Maw Maw soon falls back into her dementia and lights up again, quickly followed by Virginia. Later, however, Virginia gives Jimmy her cigarette money, stating she wants him to use it to pay for Hope's daycare and that she wants to live long enough to see what kind of person Hope will grow up to be.

== Reception ==
In its original American broadcast, "Dead Tooth" was viewed by an estimated 7.09 million viewers with a 3.1 rating/8% share among adults between the ages of 18 and 49.

The episode was met with mixed reviews from critics, though multiple praised the performance of Cloris Leachman as Maw Maw. Many also praised the performance of Kate Micucci and Martha Plimpton. "The Voice of TV" ultimately gave the episode a B+.
