= Pilot (Raising Hope) =

- Raising Hope episode
- Episode no.: Season 1 Episode 1
- Directed by: Michael Fresco
- Written by: Greg Garcia
- Original air date: September 21, 2010

Episode chronology
← Previous —	Next → "Dead Tooth"

"Pilot" is the pilot episode and the first episode of the first season of the American sitcom Raising Hope. The episode was written by series creator Greg Garcia and directed by Michael Fresco. The episode premiered September 21, 2010, on the Fox television network.

In the episode, Jimmy Chance, going out to get bubble gum ice-cream, has a one-night stand with a serial killer, resulting in an illegitimate daughter that the mother, Lucy Carlyle, names Princess Beyoncé. When Lucy is convicted of murder and executed, he gets custody of their 6-month-old daughter. He is initially convinced he will be able to raise her on his own; but eventually his family helps out, renaming the baby Hope.

According to Nielsen Media Research, the episode came fourth in its timeslot, with a 3.1 rating/8% share in the 19-49 demographic, the highest rating for the series.

== Plot ==
23-year-old Jimmy Chance (Lucas Neff) is an average Joe working for his father Burt (Garret Dillahunt) and living with him and his mother Virginia (Martha Plimpton) in the house of his great-grandmother Maw-Maw (Cloris Leachman). One night, while running an errand, Jimmy is surprised when a young woman named Lucy (Bijou Phillips) jumps into his van, claiming to be running from a maniac and urging Jimmy to drive away. He does so and Lucy rewards him by sleeping with him. The next morning, Jimmy finds Lucy having breakfast with his family. While Lucy is in the bathroom, the family sees a news report detailing that Lucy is wanted for multiple murders where she kills her lovers. Upon Lucy's return, Virginia unplugs the TV and knocks Lucy unconscious. The Chances then turn Lucy over to the police.

Eight months later, Jimmy is summoned to the prison where Lucy is being held and discovers that she is pregnant with their baby. Shortly after giving birth to a baby girl, whom she names Princess Beyonce, Lucy is seemingly executed and Jimmy is given custody of the child. Despite Burt and Virginia urging Jimmy to take the child to the fire station and turn her over for adoption, Jimmy decides to raise the child himself. En route to the local pawn shop to buy a car seat and other needed supplies, Jimmy meets Sabrina (Shannon Woodward), a grocery store cashier whom he quickly becomes attracted to.

The first day of fatherhood goes poorly for Jimmy. He manages to buy a car seat but forgets to strap it down to the backseat, causing the baby to be flung across the car. When attempting to change her diaper, Jimmy vomits at the sight. Virginia does the same when she arrives to assist. Finally, the baby spends all night crying and keeps the rest of the house awake. Finally, Burt and Virginia enter Jimmy's room and Virginia sings "Danny's Song" to the baby while Burt plays the guitar. A flashback shows a teenaged Burt and Virginia doing the same thing for Jimmy when he was a baby. Soothed by the music, the baby finally goes to sleep.

Virginia once more tries to convince Jimmy to take the baby to the fire station but Jimmy once more refuses and appeals to his parents for their help raising the child. They admit they didn't know what they were doing when raising Jimmy and finally reluctantly agree to help Jimmy out, but Virginia insists that Jimmy change the girl's name. Jimmy renames the child Hope, after Virginia admits she was always partial to the name.

== Production ==
In June 2009, Fox announced it had booked a put pilot commitment with show creator Greg Garcia. Michael Fresco signed on to direct the pilot in September 2009, which was originally titled Keep Hope Alive.

Casting announcements began in November, with Martha Plimpton and Lucas Neff as the first actors cast. Neff will portray the lead role of 23-year old Jimmy, the father to infant Hope, with Plimpton playing his mother, Virginia. Olesya Rulin joined the cast shortly thereafter as Sabrina, the new love interest for Jimmy. Garret Dillahunt came on board in late November to portray Jimmy's father, Burt.

In early December 2009, Kate Micucci was added to the cast as Jimmy's cousin. The role was originally created as a male named Mike. The pilot was filmed in December 2009, with Bijou Phillips as Lucy the serial killer/Hope's mother.

In early spring 2010, reports stated that Cloris Leachman would portray Jimmy's grandmother, Maw Maw. In March, Fox decided to recast two roles from the pilot. Shannon Woodward replaced Olesya Rulin as Sabrina, Jimmy's new love interest. Also recast was the role of Jimmy's cousin, and the role reverted to male with the addition of Skyler Stone as Mike. With this, Kate Micucci's role changed from Jimmy's cousin to become Shelly, the cousin of his love interest Sabrina.

Fox green-lit the pilot to series with an order in mid-May 2010. On May 17, 2010, Fox announced at the upfront presentation that the series, with the new title Raising Hope, was included in its 2010-11 television schedule and set for a fall 2010 premiere.

== Cultural references ==
A newscaster in the background reports, "A small-time crook with a long list of wrongs he was making amends for has finally finished, and you'll never guess how it ended." However, the newscast is cut off before we can hear more. This sort of serves as an ending for My Name Is Earl after NBC canceled it with a To be continued... ending.

== Reception ==
In its original American broadcast, "Pilot" was viewed by an estimated 7.48 million viewers with a 3.1 rating/8% share among adults between the ages of 18 and 49. The episode came fourth in its time slot and was the second highest rated show on Fox Broadcasting after Glee episode, "Audition".

Maureen Ryan of TV Squad gave the episode a mixed review saying "Nothing about it is funny and it strands two outstanding actors in a vehicle that fails to harness their many talents." John Kubicek of BuddyTV called the show a "fun little off-beat comedy". Mary McNamara of The Los Angeles Times praised the casting, comparing Martha Plimpton to Rosalind Russell and Eve Arden. Emily VanDerWerff gave a less positive review. She felt that one problem was the casting of Lucas Neff saying "Lucas Neff is such a dozey-eyed and non-essential presence here that every other actor steals the scenes they're in with him". She ultimately rated the episode with a D+.
