= Panzieri =

Panzieri is a surname. Notable people with the surname include:

- Francesco Panzieri (born 1985), Italian visual effects supervisor
- Raniero Panzieri (1921–1964), Italian politician and Marxist theoretician
- Shabbethai Panzieri, 17th-century Italian rabbi
