= Francesco Panzieri =

- Born: April 27, 1985 (age 41); Pescara, Italy
- Occupation: Visual effects supervisor
- Years active: 2009–present
- Notable work: Star Wars: The Force Awakens, Avengers: Infinity War, Dune, Indiana Jones and the Dial of Destiny
- Website: www.francescopanzieri.com

Francesco Panzieri (born April 27, 1985) is an Italian-American visual effects supervisor. He has worked on films in franchises including Star Wars, Indiana Jones, Dune, Predator, Terminator, Avengers, Spider-Man, Fast & Furious, Resident Evil, Final Destination and Men in Black, and on films directed by Steven Spielberg, J. J. Abrams, Denis Villeneuve, James Mangold and Todd Phillips, among others.

Beginning as a rotoscope and paint artist in 2009, he moved through episodic television into feature films, working in-house for studios including Marvel Studios, Lucasfilm, Netflix and Warner Bros. as a digital compositor and, from late 2019, as an in-house compositing supervisor, and was credited as additional visual effects supervisor on Happy Gilmore 2 (2025). He is a member of the Visual Effects Society and the Academy of Television Arts & Sciences, and has served on the North American advisory board of the Abruzzo Film Commission since 2019.

== Early life and education ==
Panzieri was born in Pescara, Italy, and spent his childhood between Pescara and Dubai. He became interested in visual effects as a child through films, particularly the Indiana Jones films and the original Star Wars trilogy.

He studied at the International Academy of Image Arts (Italian: Accademia Internazionale Per Le Arti & Le Scienze Dell'Immagine) in L'Aquila, where his teachers included the cinematographers Vittorio Storaro and Luciano Tovoli and the director Francesco Rosi, and where he had the opportunity to meet the composer Ennio Morricone. He graduated in 2008 with a Bachelor of Science degree in Film Science. He then moved to New York City to enroll in the one-year 3D animation and visual effects conservatory program at the New York Film Academy (NYFA), from which he graduated in 2009. There he specialized in compositing, the final assembly point of the visual effects pipeline.

== Career ==
=== Early career (2009–2014) ===
Panzieri began his career in 2009 at the Hollywood visual effects company Flash Film Works, led by William Mesa, working as a rotoscope and paint artist on the live-action web series The Blood Factory, created by John Albo and Danny DeVito. The job began as an internship that led to his hiring on the 2010 remake of Clash of the Titans, his first feature film credit.

He went on to work on Lionsgate features including Warrior (as a rotoscope and paint artist), For Colored Girls (as a 3D artist), Madea's Big Happy Family and Abduction (as a compositor), while building a large body of episodic television work. Series on which he worked include House, 90210, The Middle, Raising Hope and Hawaii Five-0 in 2011–2012, and later Mad Men, True Detective, Limitless and Sleepy Hollow, on which he composited 19 episodes. The fast turnaround of television work prepared him for large feature productions.

=== Star Wars and Marvel (2015–2019) ===
In 2015 Panzieri was brought to Bad Robot Productions as a senior digital compositor on Star Wars: The Force Awakens. Working alongside Industrial Light & Magic under visual effects supervisor Roger Guyett, he concentrated on desert scenes featuring Rey's speeder, on removing the puppeteering rig from shots of BB-8, and on a seven-day paint job on a 25-frame shot of an alien in Maz Kanata's cantina. The production, which used the code name AVCO, had some 2,100 visual effects shots, and Panzieri worked twelve-hour days in the five weeks before the film was finished.

In 2017 he worked in-house at Marvel Studios as a digital compositor on Spider-Man: Homecoming, handling 2D live-action tasks such as green-screen compositing, monitor inserts, wire removal, plate retiming and split screens. The production used the Academy Color Encoding System (ACES), which he tested for the first time in his career. He then worked with the compositing team at Digital Domain on Thor: Ragnarok (2017), joining late in production to composite, among many other shots, a blue-screen plate of Chris Hemsworth over a fully computer-generated environment in the Sakaar chase sequence, and on Avengers: Infinity War (2018), on which he composited several shots of Thanos fighting Captain America and Thor in the film's final act.

In 2018 he also entered video game work as a compositor on Call of Duty: Black Ops 4 cinematics. In 2019 he was an in-house compositor on Men in Black: International and a compositor on Once Upon a Time in Hollywood and Spider-Man: Far From Home. He also worked on Terminator: Dark Fate (2019) with an in-house team from Wylie Co.

=== Netflix and Dune (2019–2021) ===
In October 2019 Panzieri joined the Netflix production Jingle Jangle: A Christmas Journey as in-house compositing supervisor. His team spent its first five to six months on postvisualization, completing more than 230 shots, built around the "Magic Man G" musical sequence and a factory escape sequence shot entirely on blue screen; the postvisualization served as a blueprint for the final effects by vendor Framestore's Montreal studio. The in-house team then completed more than 70 final shots, including clean-ups, set extensions, color correction, split screens and retimes.

In January 2021 he joined the Netflix in-house team on Red Notice as lead compositor. The team completed more than 340 final shots in about seven months, after temping roughly 150 in postvisualization. It handled the final composites of the ballroom and museum sequences, shot under COVID-19 restrictions that kept extras off the set with the leads, played by Gal Gadot, Dwayne Johnson and Ryan Reynolds. For the ballroom scene, visual effects supervisor Richard Hoover had the leads and the background performers filmed separately, matching camera moves with floor markers and a metronome; the team then rotoscoped the performers and composited them behind the leads in more than 90 shots, with extensive stabilization and matchmoving because no motion control was used. The museum sequence added more than 50 shots.

He also joined the in-house team at Wylie Co., with whom he had worked on Terminator: Dark Fate, for the remaining visual effects work on Dune. He look-developed the hologram into which Paul Atreides steps during the Hunter-Seeker attack and handled the final compositing of the extreme close-ups of Timothée Chalamet inside it, which required blending the computer-generated element with prismatic light refractions photographed on the actor's skin, using Nuke tools such as smart vectors and ST maps.

=== Lucasfilm and Warner Bros. (2022–2025) ===
From 2022 to 2023 Panzieri worked for Lucasfilm as in-house compositing supervisor on Indiana Jones and the Dial of Destiny. His team delivered more than 300 shots across the film, 75 of them for the Tangier auction sequence, shot on a two-story hotel set ringed by blue screen. To realize director James Mangold's rising-sun concept, they divided a 2D matte painting of Tangier into sky, midtown and downtown layers and animated each one's color into a 5,600-frame night-to-day time-lapse. Uneven blue-screen density led them to replace alpha keying with an additive workflow of channel math, spill suppression and dynamic clean plates, preserving smoke, reflections and neon glow. They also built CG set extensions and a photogrammetry-based face replacement.

In 2022 he was also compositing supervisor on the television series Sprung and WeCrashed. He then worked as in-house compositing supervisor on the Warner Bros. productions Joker: Folie à Deux (2024) and Final Destination Bloodlines (2025).

=== Happy Gilmore 2 and recent work (2025–present) ===
On the Netflix and Happy Madison sequel Happy Gilmore 2 (2025), Panzieri was credited as additional visual effects supervisor. The film's 1,131 visual effects shots, which included digitally de-aged flashback sequences of Adam Sandler, were completed in roughly six months of post-production by a group of vendors that included Scanline VFX (now Eyeline), Folks VFX and Luma Pictures.

Also in 2025 he worked on Predator: Badlands. In 2026 he was an in-house compositor on Steven Spielberg's Disclosure Day and was credited as in-house compositing supervisor on Zach Cregger's Resident Evil, a Constantin Film and Columbia Pictures production shot in Prague. Production visual effects supervisor Alessandro Ongaro said Panzieri worked alongside him throughout post-production, crediting him with handling shots internally, accommodating late creative requests and helping keep quality consistent across the film's 715 visual effects shots, which were produced by vendors including Weta FX, UPP and Wylie Co.

== Industry roles and recognition ==
Since 2019 Panzieri has been a member of the North American advisory board of the Abruzzo Film Commission. He is a member of the Visual Effects Society, the Academy of Television Arts & Sciences and the Italian Visual Effects Association (Associazione Effetti Visivi).

In August 2023 he returned to Pescara for public events, including a meeting at the city's Palazzo di Città, and events organized with the non-profit Adricesta Onlus.

Films on which he worked have received Academy Awards recognition: The Force Awakens and Avengers: Infinity War were nominated for the Academy Award for Best Visual Effects (at the 88th and 91st ceremonies), and Dune won the award at the 94th.

== Filmography ==
=== Feature film ===
Year	Title	Production	Credit
2026	Resident Evil	Constantin Film, Sony Columbia Pictures	in-house compositing supervisor
2026	Disclosure Day	Universal Pictures, Amblin Entertainment	in-house compositor
2025	Predator: Badlands	20th Century Studios	in-house compositor
2025	Happy Gilmore 2	Happy Madison, Netflix	additional visual effects supervisor
2025	Final Destination Bloodlines	New Line Cinema, Warner Bros.	in-house compositing supervisor
2024	Joker: Folie à Deux	DC Studios, Village Roadshow Pictures	in-house compositing supervisor
2023	Indiana Jones and the Dial of Destiny	Walt Disney Pictures, Lucasfilm Ltd.	in-house compositing supervisor
2021	Red Notice	Netflix, Seven Bucks Productions	in-house lead compositor
2021	Dune	Legendary, Warner Bros.	in-house compositor
2020	Jingle Jangle	Netflix, Get Lifted Film Company	in-house compositing supervisor
2019	Terminator: Dark Fate	Skydance	in-house compositor
2019	Once Upon a Time in Hollywood	Sony Columbia Pictures	compositor
2019	Spider-Man: Far From Home	Sony Columbia Pictures, Marvel Studios	compositor
2019	Men in Black: International	Sony Columbia Pictures	in-house compositor
2018	Robin Hood	Lionsgate, Appian Way	in-house compositor
2018	Creed II	MGM Studios, Warner Bros.	compositor
2018	Mile 22	STX Entertainment	compositor
2018	The Equalizer 2	Sony Columbia Pictures	compositor
2018	Ant-Man and the Wasp	Marvel Studios	compositor
2018	Avengers: Infinity War	Marvel Studios	compositor
2017	Thor: Ragnarok	Marvel Studios	compositor
2017	Spider-Man: Homecoming	Sony Columbia Pictures, Marvel Studios	in-house compositor
2017	The Fate of the Furious	Universal Pictures	compositor
2015	Star Wars: The Force Awakens	Walt Disney Pictures, Lucasfilm Ltd., Bad Robot	in-house compositor
2015	Diablo	Orion Film	lead compositor
2015	Mr. Right	Amasia Entertainment	lead compositor
2014	The Road Within	Amasia Entertainment	compositor
2014	Begin Again	The Weinstein Company	compositor
2014	Winter's Tale	Warner Bros.	compositor
2011	Abduction	Lionsgate	compositor
2011	Warrior	Lionsgate	rotoscope & paint artist
2011	Madea's Big Happy Family	Lionsgate	compositor
2010	For Colored Girls	Lionsgate	3D artist & compositor
2010	Clash of the Titans	Warner Bros.	rotoscope & paint artist

=== Television ===
Year	Title	Production	Credit
2022	Sprung	Amazon Studios, IMDb TV	compositing supervisor (6 episodes)
2022	WeCrashed	Apple Studios	compositing supervisor / compositor (6 episodes)
2022	Pam & Tommy	Annapurna Studios, Hulu	compositor (1 episode)
2019	A Series of Unfortunate Events	Netflix	compositor (1 episode)
2016	Ice	Audience Network	compositor (1 episode)
2016	Westworld	HBO	compositor (2 episodes)
2016	Gotham	FOX	compositor (2 episodes)
2016	Lethal Weapon	FOX	compositor (1 episode)
2016	The Get Down	Sony Pictures Television, Netflix	compositor (1 episode)
2016	If Loving You Is Wrong	Tyler Perry Studios, OWN	compositor (5 episodes)
2016	The Haves And The Have Nots	Tyler Perry Studios, OWN	compositor (7 episodes)
2016	24: Legacy	FOX	compositor (1 episode)
2016	The Muppets	ABC	compositor (4 episodes)
2015	The Walking Dead	AMC	compositor (2 episodes)
2015	True Detective	HBO	compositor (4 episodes)
2015	Limitless	CBS	compositor (4 episodes)
2015	Agent X	TNT	compositor (2 episodes)
2015	What Would Trejo Do?	N/A	compositor (pilot)
2015	Scorpion	CBS	compositor (1 episode)
2015	Beautiful & Twisted	Lifetime	lead compositor
2015	Outlaw Prophet: Warren Jeffs	Lifetime	lead compositor
2014–2016	Sleepy Hollow	FOX	compositor (19 episodes)
2014	Houdini	History Channel	lead compositor (2 episodes)
2013	The Blacklist	NBC	compositor (2 episodes)
2013	Mad Men	AMC	compositor (3 episodes)
2013	Banshee	Cinemax	compositor (4 episodes)
2013	Trooper	CBS	compositor (pilot)
2013	Cult	CW	compositor (pilot)
2012–2013	C.S.I. Crime Scene Investigation	CBS	compositor (18 episodes)
2012–2013	The Mob Doctor	FOX	compositor (5 episodes)
2012	Hawaii Five-0	CBS	compositor (2 episodes)
2012	Lab Rats	Disney XD	compositor (2 episodes)
2012	Necessary Roughness	USA	compositor (2 episodes)
2012	Raising Hope	FOX	compositor (2 episodes)
2012	Drop Dead Diva	Lifetime	compositor (13 episodes)
2012	Weeds	Showtime	compositor (13 episodes)
2012	GCB	ABC	compositor (10 episodes)
2012	The River	ABC	compositor (8 episodes)
2012	Political Animals	USA	compositor (6 episodes)
2012	Good Luck Charlie	Disney	compositor (1 episode)
2012	American Judy	ABC	compositor (pilot)
2012	Americana	ABC	compositor (pilot)
2012	Bunheads	ABC	compositor (pilot)
2012	Dark Horse / Unentitled Roland Emmerich Project	ABC	compositor (pilot)
2012	El Jefe	FOX	compositor (pilot)
2012	Entry Level	FOX	compositor (pilot)
2012	Innocent	TNT	compositor (pilot)
2012	Living Loaded	FOX	compositor (pilot)
2012	Lovestruck: The Musical	ABC	compositor (pilot)
2012	Perception	ABC	compositor (pilot)
2012	TalhotBlond	ABC	compositor (pilot)
2012	The Smart One	ABC	compositor (pilot)
2011–2012	Revenge	ABC	lead compositor (18 episodes)
2011–2012	House, M.D.	FOX	compositor (16 episodes)
2011–2012	Castle	ABC	compositor (15 episodes)
2011–2012	Ringer	CW	compositor (11 episodes)
2011–2012	A Gifted Man	CBS	compositor (7 episodes)
2011–2012	Unforgettable	CBS	compositor (6 episodes)
2011–2012	90210	CW	compositor (5 episodes)
2011–2012	Switched At Birth	ABC	compositor (4 episodes)
2011–2012	The Middle	ABC	compositor (4 episodes)
2011	Hung	HBO	compositor (2 episodes)
2011	Glee	FOX	compositor (1 episode)
2011	NCIS	CBS	compositor (1 episode)
2011	Nikita	CW	compositor (1 episode)
2011	Pan Am	ABC	compositor (1 episode)
2011	Person of Interest	CBS	compositor (1 episode)
2011	The Closer	TNT	compositor (1 episode)

=== Music video ===
Year	Title	Director	Credit
2018	FUN! – Vince Staples	Calmatic	compositor
2017	Juice – Chromeo	David Wilson	compositor
2017	Love So Soft – Kelly Clarkson	Dave Meyers	compositor
2017	Swish Swish – Katy Perry feat. Nicki Minaj	Dave Meyers	compositor

=== Integrated advertising ===
Year	Title	Production	Credit
2016	Marvel Contest of Champions: Civil War	Kabam, AKQA	compositor
2016	Marvel Contest of Champions: Deadpool	Kabam, AKQA	compositor
2015	Toyota & All Girls Garage	Velocity Channel	compositor
2014	The Descendants	Disney Channel	compositor
2014	Wheeler Dealers	Velocity Channel	compositor

=== Cinematics ===
Year	Title	Production	Credit
2018	Call of Duty: Black Ops 4 in-game segments	72andSunny, Treyarch, Activision	compositor
2018	Call of Duty: Black Ops 4 E3 reveal promo	72andSunny, Treyarch, Activision	compositor

=== Web ===
Year	Title	Director	Credit
2009	The Blood Factory	Danny DeVito	rotoscope & paint artist
