= Friend Me =

- Genre: Sitcom
- Created by: Alan Kirschenbaum; Ajay Sahgal
- Directed by: Pamela Fryman
- Starring: Christopher Mintz-Plasse; Nicholas Braun; Amanda Lund; Dan Ahdoot; Parvesh Cheena; Steve Talley
- Country of origin: United States
- Original language: English

Production
- Executive producers: Ajay Sahgal; Alan Kirschenbaum; Eric Tannenbaum; Kim Tannenbaum
- Camera setup: Multi-camera
- Running time: 30 minutes
- Production companies: Ordinary Films; Cherry Tree Entertainment; The Tannenbaum Company; CBS Productions

Original release
- Network: CBS

Friend Me is an unaired American television comedy series about the real-life deal-of-the-day website coupon service company Groupon. The series, created by writers Alan Kirschenbaum and Ajay Sahgal, was to have been produced by CBS Television Studios but subsequently never aired after Kirschenbaum's suicide. It was confirmed as canceled on July 29, 2013, and remains unaired as of 2023. The pilot was uploaded to YouTube in 2023.

== Plot ==
The series follows two men in their 20s who move to Los Angeles to start their new lives working at Google. While one is determined to recreate himself in the new city, the other clings to their old group of friends in Bloomington, Indiana.

== Cast ==
- Christopher Mintz-Plasse as Evan
- Nicholas Braun as Rob
- Amanda Lund as Amanda
- Tim Robinson as Sully
- Haysha Deitsch as Steve
- Dan Ahdoot as Farhad
- Parvesh Cheena as Mike

== Production ==
CBS placed a series order in May 2012. The series was expected to premiere as a midseason entry during the 2012–13 television season. However, on December 6, 2012, CBS revealed that its midseason schedule did not include the series. The series would be the last project for co-creator Alan Kirschenbaum, who died of suicide on October 26, 2012.
