= Jimmy's Fake Girlfriend =

- Raising Hope episode
- Episode no.: Season 2 Episode 14
- Directed by: Rebecca Asher
- Written by: Bobby Bowman
- Original air date: February 14, 2012

Guest appearance
- Ashley Tisdale as Mary-Louise

Episode chronology
← Previous "Tarot Cards"	Next → "Sheer Madness"

"Jimmy's Fake Girlfriend" is the 14th episode of the second season of the American sitcom Raising Hope, the 36th episode of the series overall and a special Valentine's Day episode. It was written by Bobby Newman and directed by Rebecca Asher, her second directing credit for the series after Gambling Again.

In this episode, Jimmy hired a stage actor (Ashley Tisdale) to pretend to be his girlfriend to make Sabrina jealous.

"Jimmy's Fake Girlfriend" received positive reviews from the critics and fans of the show alike.

== Plot ==
After one year and a half, Jimmy still can't win Sabrina's heart and becomes depressed when he finds out that she and Wyatt are planning to move in together. Virginia hatches a plan to make Sabrina jealous. Virginia calls up Sabrina under the ruse that she is looking for Jimmy and lies to her that Jimmy has a girlfriend and they are very happy together. The next day at the grocery store, it is apparent that her plan is a success as Sabrina is snippy about Jimmy having a girlfriend. Sabrina proposes that Jimmy and his girlfriend go on a double date with Wyatt and her. Jimmy demurs that he has to work, then gets in trouble when Frank offers to take his Monday shift, freeing him and his non-existent girlfriend to go on the double date.

Jimmy explains to Frank and Barney that "the girlfriend thing" is just a lie. Jimmy, Virginia and Burt can't think of a likely prospect to be Jimmy's fake girlfriend. That night, Barney runs to their house and says he found the solution to his problem. He leads them to an improv group and introduces Mary-Louise, who Barney says has been on Broadway (the street) and would be "the perfect fake girlfriend". After a few hilarious moments between the Chance family and Mary-Louise, the fake couple (Jimmy and Mary-Louise) and the real couple (Sabrina and Wyatt) go to a Mexican restaurant for the double date. Throughout the date, Wyatt is only paying attention to "men on ice playing with sticks" on the TV, while texting on his phone. On the other hand, with help from Mary-Louise's friends from the improv group, Jimmy impresses Sabrina.

Next morning, Sabrina comes to Jimmy's house to give him the picture taken of the couples at the restaurant and says that she and Wyatt broke up last night. She still thinks that Jimmy and Mary-Louise's relationship is real. After Virginia slaps him and Burt gives him an advance, Jimmy decides to call Sabrina and tell her that his girlfriend is busy on Valentine's Day and ask her if she wants to hang out with him. Jimmy and Sabrina go to the theater of the Room for Improv'ment Players where Mary-Louise and her group work. They perform a play which the cast introduces as having been written a few hours previously. The play is a mix of narrative and confession of Jimmy to Sabrina. It shows highlights of their relationship since the first time they met, including the time when Jimmy protected Sabrina when she became excessively intoxicated on Halloween night. The play is accompanied by the song You Light Up My Life performed by Virginia and Burt. Sabrina watches in wonder as the play unfolds.

In the end, Jimmy confesses his feelings to Sabrina and says he loves her. After a brief silent moment, Sabrina runs away. Jimmy runs after her and when he looks for her, Sabrina appears, says "I hate kissing in public" and they kiss. And the episode ends with everyone finishing the song "You Light Up My Life".

== Reception ==
Phil Dyess-Nugent of The A.V. Club gave the episode an "A" and stated that this is his favorite episode on the show. Ken MacLeod of Cape Breton Post describes "the whole thing is both funny and sweet" and wonders how the series will handle the romance.
