= Gather.com =

Defunct American social network website

- Website type: News, social media outlet
- Available in: English
- Dissolved: 2015
- Headquarters: Boston, Massachusetts
- Founder: Tom Gerace
- Website: www.gather.com
- Commercial: Yes
- Registration: No longer available
- Launched: 2005
- Current status: Defunct

Gather or Gather.com was a social networking website designed to encourage interaction by discussion of various social, political and cultural topics. Its headquarters were located in Boston, Massachusetts. It became defunct in 2015.

== History ==
The website was founded in 2005 by Tom Gerace, an entrepreneur who previously founded the affiliate marketing company, Be Free. Gather attracted investments and partnerships from media companies ranging from McGraw-Hill and Hearst Publications to American Public Media and a member of the McClatchy family. Starbucks chose Gather over other social networking sites because of its adult demographic. Lotus founder Jim Manzi was an early investor. Gather was one of very few 2006 startups to use television advertising.

The "Gather News Channel" existed until 2014 when Gather Inc., including Gather.com, was sold to Kitara Media. In October, 2015, Gather became defunct.
