= Storycatchers Theatre =

American nonprofit organization

Storycatchers Theatre was a nonprofit organization in Chicago, Illinois, that served adolescents and emerging adults at all stages of court involvement with creative youth development programs. Storycatchers engaged groups of young people in the process of writing, producing and performing original musicals inspired by their own personal stories. Meade Palidofsky founded the company in 1984 and served as its artistic director until 2021. The company was dissolved in March 2025.

Storycatchers delivered its programs in partnerships that included the Illinois Department of Juvenile Justice, Cook County Juvenile Temporary Detention Center, the North Region Aftercare Field Services Office, and cultural organizations that included Steppenwolf Theatre Company and Chicago Symphony Orchestra.

Programs included Word Warriors, formerly known as Fabulous Females, for girls and boys incarcerated at the Illinois Youth Center (IYC)-Warrenville, Firewriters for boys at IYC-Chicago, Temporary LockDown for boys at the Cook County Juvenile Temporary Detention Center, and the Changing Voices post-release employment program for young people navigating reentry to Chicago neighborhoods, conducted in coordination with the newly formed Aftercare Services. Changing Voices has been recognized with a GO Innovate Award from Chicago Beyond, as well as an Art for Justice Award.

Storycatchers received a 2013 National Arts and Humanities Youth Program Award from the President's Committee on the Arts and Humanities. Meade Palidofsky accepted the award from First Lady Michelle Obama in a ceremony at the White House in November 2013.
