= Alan Kirschenbaum =

American television producer and writer

- Born: April 19, 1961; New York, U.S.
- Died: October 26, 2012 (aged 51); Burbank, California, U.S.
- Occupations: Television producer and writer, harness horseman
- Spouse(s): Vicki Juditz (?-his death; 1 child)
- Parent(s): Freddie Roman; Ethel Kirschenbaum

Alan Kirschenbaum (April 19, 1961 – October 26, 2012) was an American television sitcom producer and writer.

== Early life, family and education ==
Kirschenbaum was born in New York to stand-up comedian Freddie Roman (a.k.a. Fred Kirschenbaum) and Ethel Kirschenbaum. He had a sister, Judi. Alan's paternal great-grandfather owned the Crystal Springs Hotel in the Catskills, where Freddie Roman began performing.

Alan attended high school in New City, New York in Rockland County. He graduated from the University of Pennsylvania's Wharton School of Business with a degree in marketing in 1983.

== Career ==
=== Television ===
His early work in television was as a writer for the Judd Hirsch sitcom Dear John and the short-lived Everything's Relative. He directed some episodes of the sitcom Everybody Loves Raymond (created by his high school friend Philip Rosenthal) and was the head writer for Coach for three seasons. He was a writer for Baby Talk, a co-creator, writer and producer of the sitcom Yes, Dear, a producer/writer on Raising Hope, creator of Down the Shore (hiring college friend Lew Schneider in the leading role and Phil Rosenthal to help with writing), and co-creator of the unaired series Friend Me. He was a producer on Stark Raving Mad (an episode of which his father appeared in as himself) and Center of the Universe.

=== Other endeavors ===
Kirschenbaum was also very involved in the sport of harness racing. He worked as a racehorse trainer in college at Liberty Bell Race Track in Philadelphia and at the Meadowlands Racetrack in northern New Jersey for three years and reporter/commentator for ESPN on their Breeders Crown broadcasts. Kirschenbaum was an owner and horse breeder for many years. Kirschenbaum was also a supporter of the California Sire Stakes for harness horses. He was a supporter of the California Harness Horseman's Association, serving as president, along with being an avid amateur driver, racing in several East vs. West Coast challenges.

Additionally, Kirschenbaum worked as an instructor for the UCLA Extension Writers Program.

== Personal life ==
Kirschenbaum and his wife, actress and storyteller Vicki Juditz, had a daughter, Molly (born c. 1999).

He died by suicide on October 26, 2012. He was found dead in his home in Burbank, California. His funeral was in New City, New York.
