= Timothy Stack =

American film and television actor and screenwriter

- Born: Timothy Clifton Stack; November 21, 1954 (age 71); Doylestown, Pennsylvania, U.S.
- Occupations: Actor; screenwriter; producer
- Years active: 1979–present
- Notable credit(s): Night Stand with Dick Dietrick, Son of the Beach, My Name Is Earl
- Spouse: Jan A. Stack
- Children: 2

Timothy Clifton Stack (born November 21, 1954) is an American actor, producer and screenwriter.

== Life and career ==
=== Education ===
Timothy was born in Doylestown, Pennsylvania, the son of Joan and Tom Stack. He graduated from the Philadelphia-area prep school Germantown Academy in 1973 and graduated from Boston College in 1978. After graduating, Tim moved to Los Angeles and quickly joined the improvisational comedy group The Groundlings in 1979.

=== Television ===
==== 1980s ====
Some of Stack's early roles include appearances in shows such as Days of Our Lives, Benson, Laverne & Shirley, Remington Steele, Night Court, Quincy, M.E., and ALF among others. In 1986, he appeared in a five-episode arc of Punky Brewster, as rule-obsessed but unfeeling DCFS social worker Simon Chillings, originally charged with Henry's petition to adopt Punky, but who instead removes her from Henry's care, concerned Henry could not adequately support her after his business burns down and he is hospitalized with an ulcer. Convinced Punky would be permanently better off with another foster family, he places her with a wealthy couple, Jules and Tiffany Buckworth. Ultimately, Jules Buckworth leaves Tiffany and returns Punky to Henry, who completes the adoption. When Simon calls Henry's new studio to congratulate him on the adoption, he reaches Mike, who laughs, reminding him he was the one trying to keep them apart. Simon states that he has quit his job with DCFS and has become romantically involved with Tiffany Buckworth.

==== 1990s and early 2000s ====
In the early 1990s, Stack's appearances included episodes of The Golden Girls, The Wonder Years, Seinfeld, and Wings. He played the father of the main character on Parker Lewis Can't Lose (1990–1993). He later starred as Dick Dietrick on the raunchy talk show send-up/satire Night Stand with Dick Dietrick (1995–1997).

Stack then played Notch Johnson on Son of the Beach, a Howard Stern-produced Baywatch send-up which aired on the FX cable channel from 2000 to 2002. He also wrote several episodes of Son of the Beach.

=== Film ===
Stack has appeared in many films including Back to School (1986), Clifford (1994), the principal in Idle Hands (1999), Cast Away (2000), Dumb and Dumberer: When Harry Met Lloyd (2003), Scary Movie 3 (2003), and American Pie Presents: Band Camp (2005). Stack also got voiceover work, e.g. The Brave Little Toaster film series (1987–1998), as Lampy the orange desktop lamp.

=== Other work ===
Beginning in 2005, Stack started appearing in a recurring sketch on The Tonight Show with Jay Leno called Pumpcast News. In the sketch, Stack plays a fictional cable news reporter who interacts with customers at gas pumps-–sometimes completely taking people off guard. Stack also acted out a fictional version of himself on the television program My Name Is Earl, in which he was depicted as an arrogant, depressed, alcoholic resident of Camden County who frequently hosted beauty pageants and parades. Other programs Stack has guest starred in include Malcolm in the Middle, Curb Your Enthusiasm, and Ghosts. He also hosts the computer DVD game Outburst.

=== Personal life ===
He lives with his wife Jan Stack and their children Murphy and Doyle.

== Filmography ==
=== Films ===
Year	Film	Role	Director	Notes
1982	The Best Little Whorehouse in Texas	Melvin's Crew	Colin Higgins	
1985	The Aviator	First Officer	George T. Miller	
1986	Back to School	Trendy Man	Alan Metter	
1987	Blind Date	Grant	Blake Edwards	
1987	The Brave Little Toaster	Lampy / Zeke	Jerry Rees	voice
1989	Martians Go Home	Seagrams	David Odell	
1992	Double Trouble	Albers	John Paragon	
1992	Nervous Ticks	Tim	Rocky Lang	
1994	Clifford	Kevin's Father	Paul Flaherty	
1994	It's Pat	Doctor	Adam Bernstein	
1996	Dear God	Cousin Guy, the Postal Cop	Garry Marshall	
1997	The Brave Little Toaster to the Rescue	Lampy	Robert C. Ramirez	voice
1998	The Brave Little Toaster Goes to Mars	Lampy	Robert C. Ramirez	voice
1999	Idle Hands	Principal Tidwell	Rodman Flender	
2000	Cast Away	Morgan Stockton	Robert Zemeckis	
2003	Dumb and Dumberer: When Harry Met Lloyd	Doctor	Troy Miller	
2003	Scary Movie 3	Carson Ward	David Zucker	
2004	Teacher's Pet	Daddy	Timothy Björklund	
2005	American Pie Presents: Band Camp	Mr. Nelson	Steve Rash	
2006	Funny Money	Dr. Rogers	Leslie Greif	
2007	Welcome to Paradise	Eugene Fennig	Brent Huff	

=== TV series ===
Year	Title	Role	Notes
1981	Lou Grant	Mayberry	Episode: "Boomerang"
1981	Thornwell	Means	Television film
1981	Days of Our Lives	Mark Garrett	
1981	Quincy, M.E.	Mr. Crowley	Episode: "Slow Boat to Madness"
1981	Trapper John, M.D.	Male Patient	Episodes: "The Albatross" and "Angel of Mercy"
1982	Benson	C.C. McFadden	Episode: "Getting Even"
1982	Desire, the Vampire	Daryl	Television film
1982	Laverne & Shirley	Bank Teller	Episode: "Death Row"
1983	The Winds of War	Yeoman Ryan	Television miniseries
1983	Murder Me, Murder You	Natty	Television film
1983	Reggie	Tom Lockett	
1983	AfterMASH	Ernie Temple / Heard	Episodes: "Little Broadcast of '53" and "The Recovery Room"
1984	Cagney & Lacey	Bartender	Episode: "Insubordination"
1985	The Facts of Life	Carl	Episode: "Jazzbeau"
1985	Remington Steele	Arthur McKinley Reynolds III	Episode: "Springtime for Steele"
1985	The Paper Chase		Episode: "It's Only a Show"
1986	That's My Mama Now!	Deuce	Television film
1986	Punky Brewster	Simon P. Chillings	Episode: "Changes"
1986	It's a Living	Raymond	Episode: "Night at the Iguana"
1987	Night Court	Bill / Tim Bond / Mr. Marley	Episodes: "The Modest Proposal", "From Snoop to Nuts", "Wedding Bell Blues"
1987	Starman	Henry Kimble	Episode: "The Wedding"
1987	The New Adventures of Beans Baxter	Murray De Lamour	Episode: "Beans and the Satanic Backwards Masking Conspiracy"
1987	Thirtysomething	Maitre D' / Valet Parking Attendant / Movie Ticket Seller	Episode: "But Not for Me"
1988	Walt Disney's Wonderful World of Color	Officer Swan	Episode: "Justin Case"
1989	ALF	Jim	Episode: "Happy Together"
1989	Free Spirit	Dick Drake	Episode: "Radio Nights"
1989	Doctor Doctor	Sam	Episodes: "Running on M.D.", "The M.D. Nest Syndrome", "Bachelor Doctor", "No Free Lunch"
1990	The Golden Girls	Agent Bell	Episode: "The President's Coming! The President's Coming!"
1990	Tales from the Crypt	Frank	Episode: "My Brother's Keeper"
1990	Hurricane Sam	Bob Kelvin	Television film
1990	Almost Vegas		Television film
1990	Parker Lewis Can't Lose	Mr. Martin Lewis	1990–1993
1991	The Flash	Jim Kline	Episode: "The Trickster"
1991	Father Dowling Mysteries	Stu	Episode: "The Consulting Detective Mystery"
1991	My Life and Times	Daniel Miller	Episodes: "Millennium" and "Fare on Park Avenue"
1991	Pacific Station		Episode: "A Man's Best Friend"
1992	Maid for Each Other	Larry the Lawyer	Television film
1992	Ring of the Musketeers	1st Federal Agent	Television film
1993	Johnny Bago	Lee Corsair / Bob Burrows / National Tattletale Reporter	Episodes: "Johnny Bago Free at Last", "Johnny's Golden Shaft", "Lady Madonna", "Spotting Elvis"
1993	The Wonder Years	Mr. Plenitzer	Episode: "Eclipse"
1993	Seinfeld	Dwayne	Episode: "The Glasses"
1993	The John Larroquette Show	Feinberg	Episode: "There's a Mister Hitler Here to See You"
1993	The Mommies	Detective Malone	Episode: "Christmas"
1994	Nurses	Oscar	Episode: "Parental Guidance Suggested"
1994	The Second Half	Charles	Episode: "Far and Awry"
1994	L.A. Law	Stanton's Atty. Stoddard	Episode: "Tunnel of Love"
1994	Wings	Mr. Elias	Episode: "A Decent Proposal"
1995	On Our Own	Mr. Pinapel	Episode: "The Boarder"
1995	My Brother's Keeper	Father Frank	Television film
1995	Night Stand with Dick Dietrick	Dick Dietrick	Series lead (1995–1997)
2000	Son of the Beach	Notch Johnson	Series lead (2000–2002)
2005	The Tonight Show with Jay Leno	Jack Rafferty	2005–2013
2005	Malcolm in the Middle	Sam	Episode: "Stilts"
2005	The Surreal Life	Jeff Probe	Episode: "Voted Out of Vegas"
2005	My Name Is Earl	TV's Tim Stack	2005–2009
2007	Tim Stack's Family Vacation	TV's Tim Stack	Television pilot
2012	Raising Hope	TV's Tim Stack / Notch Johnson (uncredited)	Episodes: "Gambling Again" and "Making the Band"
2018	LA to Vegas	Hot Tea	Episode: "The Yips and the Dead"
2026	Ghosts	Gus	Episode: "Gate-gate"

=== Producer/executive producer ===
Year	Title	Notes
1995	Night Stand with Dick Dietrick	Executive producer (1995–1996)
2000	Son of the Beach	Executive producer (2000–2002)
2005	My Name Is Earl	Consulting producer (2005–2009)
2007	Tim Stack's Family Vacation	Executive producer (2000–2002)
2010	Raising Hope	Consulting producer (2010–2014)
2015	The Millers	Consulting producer (2014–2015)

=== Writer ===
Year	Title	Notes
1986	Saturday Night Live	11.17 "Jimmy Breslin and Marvin Hagler/Level 42/E.G. Daily"; 11.18 "Anjelica Huston and Billy Martin/George Clinton & Parliament-Funkadelic" (additional sketches)
1988	Glory Days	Television film
1989	Doctor Doctor	2.02 "Member of the Club"
1992	What She Doesn't Know	Television film
1994	On Our Own	1.11 "That's My Car and I'm Sticking to It"; 1.18 "Little Rascals"
1995	Night Stand with Dick Dietrick	86 episodes (1995–1997)
1997	Family Matters	9.06 "A Mind Is a Terrible Thing to Read"; 9.21 "Lost in Space"
2000	Son of the Beach	42 episodes (2000–2002)
2005	My Name Is Earl	7 episodes (2005–2009)
2011	Raising Hope	9 episodes (2011–2014)
2015	The Millers	2.11 "Hero"
2015	Kirby Buckets	2.03 "The Gil in My Life"

== Awards and nominations ==
Year	Award	Work	Category	Result	Reference
2005	Writers Guild of America Award	My Name Is Earl (shared with Barbie Adler, Bobby Bowman, Vali Chandrasekaran, J.B. Cook, Brad Copeland, Victor Fresco, Gregory Thomas Garcia, John Hoberg, Kat Likkel, Michael Pennie, Hilary Winston and Danielle Sanchez-Witzel)	Best Comedy Series	Nominated	
2006	Writers Guild of America Award	My Name Is Earl (shared with Barbie Adler, Bobby Bowman, Vali Chandrasekaran, J.B. Cook, Brad Copeland, Victor Fresco, Gregory Thomas Garcia, John Hoberg, Kat Likkel, Michael Pennie, Hilary Winston and Danielle Sanchez-Witzel)	Best New Series	Nominated	
