= Eyal Gordin =

American cinematographer

- איל גורדין
- Born: Israel
- Occupations: Director and cinematographer
- Years active: 1988–present

Eyal Gordin (Hebrew: איל גורדין) is an American cinematographer and television director.

Born in Rehovot in 1955 and lived in Givat Brener until 5 years old. His parents left the Kibbutz because the Kibbutz was against his father’s participation in the folk group “Lehakat Karmon”. The family moved to Eilat, where Eyal and his brother Ofer grew up. Their sister Maya was born in 1972. He moved to the U.S. in 1984.

He began his career as a camera operator working on the films Kansas (1988), Highway to Hell (1992) and Kalifornia (1993). Before working in the television series Babylon 5, Buffy the Vampire Slayer and Freaks and Geeks.

He eventually made his directorial debut directing an episode of The Division, later amassing directing credits for series My Name Is Earl, Everybody Hates Chris, Jonas, Zeke and Luther and Raising Hope.

Gordin is also the founding farmer of Lemon Acres, LLC, a lemon farm located in Moorpark, California, founded in 2004. He married Wendy Heydt in 1986 and they have 2 sons. Ari Gordin who was born in 1988 and is a neurologist living in Reno Nevada with his wife Courtney. Nolan, who was born in 1990 and lives in Portland Oregon and works as a video producer in Squarespace.

== Directing credits ==
From 2004 to present:

- The Division
- Everybody Hates Chris
- My Name Is Earl
- Worst Week
- Jonas
- Raising Hope
- Friends with Benefits
- Man Up
- The Middle
- Super Fun Night
