= Lucas Neff =

American actor (born 1985)

- Born: November 7, 1985 (age 39); Chicago, Illinois, U.S.
- Education: University of Illinois at Chicago
- Occupation: Actor
- Years active: 2009–present
- Spouse: Caitlin Stasey (m. 2016; div. 2020)

Lucas Neff (born November 7, 1985) is an American actor. Known primarily for his work in television, Neff received mainstream recognition for his lead role as James "Jimmy" Chance on the Fox sitcom Raising Hope (2010–2014).

After Raising Hope, Neff had main roles as Jason on the ABC sitcom Downward Dog (2017), David on the Lifetime series American Princess (2019), and Dr. Caleb Sommers on the CBS medical sitcom Carol's Second Act (2019–2020). His recurring roles include Ryan Wheeler on the Hulu series The Handmaid's Tale (2022), Paul Sutton on the Starz series Power Book III: Raising Kanan (2023–2024), and Captain Edmund Dellinger in the Netflix miniseries American Primeval (2025).

Neff had main voice roles as Donny on the Netflix animated series Trash Truck (2020–2021) and Duncan P. Anderson on the Disney+ and Disney Channel animated sitcom Monsters at Work (2021; 2024).

== Early and personal life ==
Neff was born in Chicago, Illinois, and raised in the neighborhood of Andersonville. His mother, Meade Palidofsky, is the founder of Storycatchers Theatre and his father, Alan, is a lawyer and novelist. He is of Irish and Jewish descent. He graduated from Whitney M. Young Magnet High School in 2004 and with a Bachelor of Fine Arts in Theater at the University of Illinois at Chicago in 2008. He started acting when he was mistakenly assigned to the performing arts department at UIC. After college, he took classes at the Steppenwolf Theatre Company in Chicago. Neff has a younger brother. He lives in Los Angeles, California. He and Australian actress Caitlin Stasey were married in 2016, and divorced in late 2020.

== Career ==
His local theater debut was in the Chicago-based theater company Collaboraction's production of Jon. While trying to start his career by appearing in storefront theater and commercials, Neff financed himself by cleaning houses, which he only began a week before being cast in his first major role. His first television role came when he was cast in a minor role in the series finale of A&E Network's The Beast.

When a nationwide casting call was put out for Raising Hope, Neff taped his ten-page audition and sent it in to Greg Garcia. From the first tape, Neff became Garcia's first choice for the role of Jimmy Chance. However, he was still required to go through multiple auditions, before he could be confirmed in his first major role. Neff said of the series at the time of the pilot, "It's a very sweet-hearted, kind show, and it places family first and doing the right thing first. You don't see a lot of that in TV or movies. We celebrate a lot of fancy heroes and fancy criminals and infidelity and, generally, just a lot of bad behavior. It's nice to be part of a show that celebrates decency and being good to one another."

Neff maintained his links with the theater, writing plays, such as The Last Duck, which was performed at the Jackalope Theatre in Chicago as the final play of the 2011–2012 season. It was nominated for a Joseph Jefferson Award for Best New Work.

== Filmography ==
=== Film ===
Year	Title	Role(s)	Notes
2010	Amigo	Shanker	
2011	In Memoriam	Jay	
2013	Delicious Ambiguity	Ashley	Short film
2015	Jim & Helen Forever	David	Short film
2015	We Know You Have a Choice	Trent	Short film
2015	Glitch	Will	
2016	I Love You Both	Andy	
2016	Slash	The Kragon	
2016	Fear, Inc.	Joe Foster	
2017	Cock N' Bull 2	Josh	Short film
2018	The Attempt	Cole	Short film
2019	Marriage Story	Pablo	
2019	Married Young	Michael	
2022	Low Life	Jason	

=== Television ===
Year	Title	Role	Notes
2009	The Beast	Young Agent	Episode: "No Turning Back"
2010–2014	Raising Hope	James "Jimmy" Chance	Main cast
2017	Downward Dog	Jason	Main cast
2018–2021	Big Hero 6: The Series	Noodle Burger Boy / additional voices (voice)	Recurring role
2019	American Princess	David	Main cast
2019–2020	Carol's Second Act	Dr. Caleb Sommers	Main cast
2020–2021	Trash Truck	Donny (voice)	Main cast
2021–2024	Monsters at Work	Duncan P. Anderson / Snore's Father / Richard / additional voices (voice)	Main cast
2022	The Handmaid's Tale	Ryan Wheeler	4 episodes
2022	Hamster & Gretel	Billy / additional voices (voice)	Episode: "Hamnesia/Romancing the Scone"
2023–2024	Power Book III: Raising Kanan	Paul Sutton	4 episodes
2025	American Primeval	Captain Edmund Dellinger	5 episodes
2025	Shifting Gears	Jimmy	2 episodes
