= Michael Fresco =

American television director and producer

- Occupation(s): Television director, television producer
- Years active: 1988–2017

Michael Fresco is an American television director and television producer.

Most notably Fresco has directed a number of episodes from shows including The O.C., My Name is Earl and the pilots to 1-800-Missing, Suburgatory, and Providence. He has also been a producer on Providence along with other shows such as Northern Exposure, which earned him a Primetime Emmy Award nomination in the category Outstanding Drama Series. He has also directed nine episodes of the series Better Off Ted (2009–10), written by his brother, Victor Fresco.
