= Raising Hope =

American television sitcom (2010–2014)

- Genre: Sitcom
- Created by: Greg Garcia
- Starring: Lucas Neff; Martha Plimpton; Garret Dillahunt; Shannon Woodward; Gregg Binkley; Cloris Leachman
- Narrated by: Lucas Neff
- Opening theme: "Daddy-O" by the Freelance Economy (Kerry Smith)
- Composers: Danny Lux; Matt Mariano
- Country of origin: United States
- Original language: English
- No. of seasons: 4
- No. of episodes: 88 (list of episodes)

Production
- Executive producers: Greg Garcia; Mike Mariano; Joey Gutierrez; Mark Stegemann; Michael Fresco (pilot only)
- Producers: Henry J. Lange Jr. Kim Hamberg; Elijah Aron; Jordan Young; Audra Sielaff; Becky Mann; Dave Holstein
- Cinematography: Walt Fraser; Sharon Meir
- Camera setup: Single-camera
- Running time: 30 minutes
- Production companies: Amigos de Garcia Productions (2010–2013) (seasons 1–3); Slowly I Turned Productions (2013–2014) (season 4); 20th Century Fox Television

Original release
- Network: Fox
- Release: September 21, 2010 – April 4, 2014

Related
- My Name Is Earl

Raising Hope is an American television sitcom created by Greg Garcia that aired on Fox from September 21, 2010, to April 4, 2014. Following its first season, the show received two nominations at the 63rd Primetime Emmy Awards. Martha Plimpton was nominated for Outstanding Lead Actress in a Comedy Series, and Cloris Leachman was nominated for Outstanding Guest Actress in a Comedy Series. Plimpton also won the 2011 Satellite Award for Best Actress in a Comedy Series.

The fourth season premiered Friday, November 15, 2013, at 9:00 pm Eastern/8:00 pm Central with back-to-back episodes. Greg Garcia left Raising Hope to work on The Millers for CBS. On March 10, 2014, Fox cancelled the show after four seasons. The series finale aired on April 4, 2014.

== Premise ==
James "Jimmy" Chance is a 23-year-old living in the quirky fictional Californian town of Natesville who impregnates a serial killer during a one-night stand. Earning custody of his unexpected daughter, Hope, after the mother is sentenced to death, Jimmy relies on his unorthodox but well-intentioned family for support in raising her.

== Cast and characters ==
- Lucas Neff as James "Jimmy" Bon Jovi Chance, Hope's father. A good-natured, wide-eyed 23-year-old who is clueless about raising a child and everything else. Jimmy goes to Howdy's Market in Natesville to get items for baby Hope, where he meets Sabrina.
- Martha Plimpton as Virginia Slims Chance (née Thompson), Hope's paternal grandmother, Jimmy's mother, and Burt's wife. Virginia became pregnant with Jimmy at age fifteen, delivering him when she was sixteen. Virginia works as a maid, cleaning houses of upper-class people while the Chances appear to live just above the poverty line.
- Garret Dillahunt as Engleburt "Burt" Jebbidiah Chance, Hope's paternal grandfather, Jimmy's father, and Virginia's husband. Burt conceived Jimmy with Virginia when he was seventeen. He has a lawn care/pool cleaning business with Jimmy as his assistant.
- Shannon Woodward as Sabrina Chance (née Collins), Jimmy's coworker and eventual wife and Hope's adoptive mother.
- Cloris Leachman as Barbara June "Maw Maw" Thompson (recurring season 1, starring seasons 2–4), Virginia's 84-year-old grandmother, Jimmy's great-grandmother, and Hope's great-great-grandmother. Her dementia is a plot line of several episodes and forces her granddaughter to have to take care of her, while Virginia and Burt live in Maw Maw's house rent free.
- Gregg Binkley as Barney Hughes (recurring season 1, starring seasons 2–4), manager of the store where Jimmy and Sabrina work.
- Baylie and Rylie Cregut as Hope Chance (born Princess Beyonce Carlyle), Jimmy's and Lucy's daughter and adopted daughter of Sabrina, Virginia and Burt's granddaughter and Maw Maw's great-great-granddaughter.

== Episodes ==
Season	Episodes	Originally released	
Season	Episodes	First released	Last released
1	22	September 21, 2010	May 17, 2011
2	22	September 20, 2011	April 17, 2012
3	22	October 2, 2012	March 28, 2013
4	22	November 15, 2013	April 4, 2014

== Development and production ==
In June 2009, Fox announced it had booked a put pilot commitment with show creator Greg Garcia.

Actress Olesya Rulin was originally cast as Sabrina, the love interest for Jimmy, and Kate Micucci was added to the cast as Jimmy’s cousin. The pilot was filmed in December 2009. In March 2010, Fox decided to recast two roles from the pilot. Shannon Woodward replaced Rulin as Sabrina. Also recast was the role of Jimmy's cousin, changing from Micucci to male actor Skyler Stone as Mike. With this, Micucci's role changed from Jimmy's cousin to become Shelley, Sabrina's cousin.

Fox green-lit the pilot to series with an order in mid-May 2010 for a fall premiere in its 2010–11 television schedule.

On January 10, 2011, Fox renewed Raising Hope for a second season. On April 9, 2012, Raising Hope was renewed for a third season. On March 4, 2013, Raising Hope was renewed for a fourth season. On March 10, 2014, Fox announced the cancellation of the show after four seasons.

== Reception ==
=== Critical reception ===
Critical response of Raising Hope
Season	Rotten Tomatoes	Metacritic
1	87% (38 reviews)	75 (24 reviews)
2	100% (11 reviews)	—N/a
3	100% (6 reviews)	—N/a
4	100% (8 reviews)	—N/a

Raising Hope has received positive reviews from critics. On the review aggregator Rotten Tomatoes, the show's first season holds a 87% based on 38 reviews, with an average score of 6.7/10. The website's consensus reads, "Thanks to a talented and well-matched cast, Raising Hope largely manages to balance crude, absurdist humor with moments of charm without languishing in one or exploiting the other." On Metacritic, the season holds an weighted average score of 75 out of 100 on Metacritic based on 24 critics' reviews, indicating "generally favorable reviews".

Tom Gliatto of People Weekly called the show the best new sitcom of the season, favorably comparing it to Malcolm in the Middle. Mary McNamara of the Los Angeles Times was lukewarm towards the show, stating that "Raising Hope is funny, sweet, occasionally provocative, and occasionally over-the-top in a regrettable way." James Poniewozik of Time Magazine was upbeat, stating that "Neff is amiably charming, Dillahunt and Plimpton give their characters a realism that belies the pilot's often-contemptuous jokes, and maybe 20% of the first episode shows a sweet-heartedness that rises above the easy white-trash humor." While not all of the reviews were positive, they were mostly positive by the end of the first season. Much of the show's praise went to the performances of Martha Plimpton and Garret Dillahunt.

The second season received critical acclaim on Rotten Tomatoes with a 100% based on 11 reviews, with an average score of 7/10. The consensus reads, "Raising Hope nurses a winsome sweetness in an improved second season that shears off the comedic bits that didn't work while expounding upon the blue collar charm and gleaming heart that lured viewers in." Matt Roush of TV Guide called the show in his season 2 review "A treat for anyone who loves a good call-back to classic sitcoms."

The third and fourth season also received critical acclaim on Rotten Tomatoes with a 100% based on 6 reviews for season 3 and based on 8 reviews for season 4.

=== Ratings ===
Season	Timeslot (ET/PT)	Episodes	Premiered		Ended		TV Season	Rank	Viewers (in millions)
Season	Timeslot (ET/PT)	Episodes	Date time	Premiere Viewers (in millions)	Date	Finale Viewers (in millions)	TV Season	Rank	Viewers (in millions)
1	Tuesday 9:00 pm	22	September 21, 2010	7.31	May 17, 2011	5.40	2010–2011	#85	6.45
2	Tuesday 9:30 pm (September 20, 2011 – February 21, 2012; April 10–17, 2012); Tuesday 8:00 pm (March 6 – April 3, 2012)	22	September 20, 2011	6.73	April 17, 2012	3.79	2011–2012	#106	5.64
3	Tuesday 8:00 pm Thursday 9:00 pm (March 28, 2013)	22	October 2, 2012	3.90	March 28, 2013	3.28	2012–2013	#106	4.56
4	Friday 9:00 & 9:30 pm	22	November 15, 2013	2.35	April 4, 2014	1.52	2013–2014	#144	2.69

== Awards and nominations ==
Awards and nominations for Raising Hope
Year	Award	Category	Recipients	Outcome
2010	Satellite Awards	Best Television Series – Comedy or Musical	Raising Hope	Nominated
2010	Jamison Awards	Favorite Avery Laugh Award	Raising Hope	Won
2011	Casting Society of America	Outstanding Achievement in Casting – Television Pilot – Comedy	Dava Waite	Won
2011	Emmy Awards	Outstanding Lead Actress in a Comedy Series	Martha Plimpton	Nominated
2011	Emmy Awards	Outstanding Guest Actress in a Comedy Series	Cloris Leachman	Nominated
2011	People's Choice Awards	Favorite New TV Comedy	Raising Hope	Nominated
2011	Satellite Awards	Best Actress in a TV series – Comedy or Musical	Martha Plimpton	Won
2011	Teen Choice Awards	Choice TV – Breakout Show	Raising Hope	Nominated
2011	Television Critics Association Awards	Outstanding Achievement in Comedy	Raising Hope	Nominated
2011	Critics' Choice Television Award	Best Actress in a Comedy Series	Martha Plimpton	Nominated
2011	Young Artist Awards	Best Performance in a TV Series – Recurring Young Actress 11–16	Kelly Heyer	Nominated
2012	Motion Picture Sound Editors	Best Sound Editing – Music for Short Form Television	Sharyn M. Tylk and Susan Ham	Won
2012	Young Artist Awards	Best Young Actress Recurring in a Television Series	Kelly Heyer	Nominated
2012	Critics' Choice Television Award	Best Comedy Actress	Martha Plimpton	Nominated
2012	Critics' Choice Television Award	Best Comedy Actor	Garret Dillahunt	Nominated
2012	Emmy Awards	Outstanding Original Music and Lyrics	Matthew Thompson	Nominated
2013	GLAAD Media Awards	Outstanding Individual Episode (in a series without a regular LGBT character)	Raising Hope	Won

== International broadcasts ==
In the United Kingdom, Sky1 picked up the broadcast rights and added the show to its 2010–2011 UK & Ireland autumn schedule, beginning in November 2010.

In Australia, Ten originally broadcast the series before moving it to Eleven.

In Portugal, the series premiered on January 29, 2011, on Fox Life.

In Brazil, the series premiered on September 22, 2010, on FOX.

In Italy, the series premiered on February 3, 2011, on Fox. The Italian title is Aiutami Hope!.

In the Central and Eastern Europe, the series broadcasts on HBO, where it premiered on February 1, 2011. The Czech title is Vychovávat Hope.

In Latin America, the series broadcasts on I.Sat, where it premiered in March 2011.

In Canada, the first season aired on the Global Television Network at the same time as Fox in the United States. In 2011, City bought rights from the Global Television Network, and began broadcasting the show. On the morning show that City airs, Breakfast Television, they announced on May 29, 2011, that the series will start airing at 8:00 pm on Tuesdays instead of 9:30 pm on Tuesdays due to other Fox series Glee moving to Thursdays at 9:00pm. This started on September 18, 2012.

In Finland, the first season aired on Sub on January 10, 2013. The Finnish title is Isän Tyttö.

In Germany, the series broadcasts on RTL Nitro, where it on September 10, 2012. Seasons 3 and 4 premiered on NOW!.

In Bosnia, Serbia and Croatia, the series was broadcast on Fox Adria. In January, 2018 RTL 2 picked up series for Croatia.
