= Greg Garcia (producer) =

American television writer, producer and director (born 1970)

- Born: Gregory Thomas Garcia; April 4, 1970 (age 56); Arlington County, Virginia, U.S.
- Occupations: Television writer, producer, director
- Spouse: Kim
- Children: 3, including Camden

Gregory Thomas Garcia (born April 4, 1970) is an American television writer, producer and director. He is the creator/executive producer of several long-running sitcoms, including Yes, Dear, My Name Is Earl (in which he made seven cameo appearances), The Guest Book, Raising Hope, and Sprung. He has also worked for the series Family Matters and as a consulting producer on Family Guy.

== Early life ==
Garcia was born in Arlington County, Virginia. His parents Tom and Natalie Garcia raised Greg and his older sister Shelley in the Pimmit Hills neighborhood of Fairfax County, Virginia and then North Arlington, Virginia.

After graduating in 1988 from Yorktown High School (also his mother's alma mater), Garcia attended Frostburg State University in Frostburg, Maryland, where he participated in the Warner Bros. outreach program Writing for Television courses, which ultimately opened the door for him as a writer in Hollywood.

== Career ==
Garcia worked as a board operator and DJ for Tony Kornheiser on The Tony Kornheiser Show radio show on WTEM. He was also an intern for the Don and Mike Show radio program in Fairfax, Virginia.

Relocating to work in Hollywood, his early show business work included as an extra on the teen drama TV series Beverly Hills, 90210 and as a production assistant on Step by Step. In the mid-1990s, he began writing for sitcoms On Our Own and Family Matters, which led to co-writing the pilot for the short-lived series Built to Last with Warren Hutcherson (1997). During the 2007–2008 Writers Guild of America strike, he worked as a cashier and janitor at a Burger King in Burbank, California as research for a potential book.

Garcia wrote for, created, produced and directed the sitcoms Yes, Dear, Raising Hope, My Name Is Earl, The Guest Book. and Sprung. He won the Primetime Emmy Award for Outstanding Writing for a Comedy Series for My Name Is Earl in 2006.

Garcia co-wrote the book for the musical Escape to Margaritaville featuring the songs of Jimmy Buffett with Mike O'Malley.

== Personal life ==
Garcia and his wife Kim have three sons, and they reside in the Los Angeles area. Kim and Greg attended the same college, Frostburg State University. Garcia received an honorary doctorate from his alma mater in May 2024.

Garcia has been incorrectly labeled as a Scientologist, after reports in the Daily Mirror were amplified by actor Alec Baldwin. While several cast members on My Name is Earl cast were Scientologists, Garcia stated:

I am not currently nor have I ever been a Scientologist. ... I am in fact born and raised Catholic.

== Filmography ==
Year	Title	Role	Note
1995–1997	Family Matters	Story editor	
1997	Built to Last	Co-creator/supervising producer	
2000–01	Family Guy	Consulting producer	
2000–06	Yes, Dear	Co-creator/executive producer	Wrote 1 episode
2005–09	My Name Is Earl	Creator/executive producer	Directed 6 episodes, wrote 7 episodes
2010–14	Raising Hope	Creator/executive producer	Directed 5 episodes, wrote 8 episodes
2013–14	The Millers	Creator/executive producer	Wrote 1 episode
2017–18	The Guest Book	Creator/executive producer	Directed 8 episodes, wrote all 20 episodes
2022	Sprung	Creator/executive producer	Directed and wrote all 10 episodes
