= List of Yes, Dear episodes =

The following is a list of episodes for the American sitcom television series Yes, Dear. The series ran on CBS from October 2, 2000 to February 15, 2006, with a total of 122 episodes produced, spanning six seasons.

== Series overview ==
Season	Episodes	Originally released		Average viewers (in millions)	Rank
Season	Episodes	First released	Last released	Average viewers (in millions)	Rank
1	24	October 2, 2000	May 14, 2001	13.1	#28
2	24	September 24, 2001	May 13, 2002	13.9	#21
3	24	September 23, 2002	May 19, 2003	13.3	#25
4	24	September 22, 2003	May 24, 2004	10.7	#40
5	11	February 16, 2005	May 18, 2005	9.2	#53
6	15	September 14, 2005	February 15, 2006	7.8	#85

== Episodes ==
=== Season 1 (2000–01) ===
No. overall	No. in season	Title	Directed by	Written by	Original release date	Prod. code	U.S. viewers (millions)
1	1	"Pilot"	Andrew D. Weyman	Alan Kirschenbaum & Gregory Thomas Garcia	October 2, 2000	1AEJ79	14.63
After Greg arranges for a frazzled Kim and Christine to have a break from the kids, he lets Jimmy talk him into taking the kids with them to a casino. Note: This is the only episode where Logan is played by Blake, Easton and Hunter Draut.
2	2	"Weaning Isn't Everything"	Andrew D. Weyman	Bobby Bowman & Douglas Lieblein	October 9, 2000	1AEJ01	14.72
When Greg is surprised to find out Kim's still breast-feeding Sammy, he is even more surprised to find out the reason why. Notes: From here until "Vegas Vacation", Logan will be played by Christopher and Nicholas Berry. This is also the last episode where Dominic is played by Connor and Keenan Merkovich.
3	3	"The Good Couple"	Richard Correll	Alan Kirschenbaum & Gregory Thomas Garcia	October 16, 2000	1AEJ04	14.74
Appearances can be deceiving, as the Warners and Hughes both have unexpected outcomes to outtings with parents of children that theirs befriended at a park. Note: Starting with this episode, Dominic is now played by Joel Homan.
4	4	"You Wanna?"	Steven Levitan	Alan Kirschenbaum & Gregory Thomas Garcia	October 23, 2000	1AEJ06	13.23
Though depressed over a lacking sex life since Sammy's birth, when Kim finds out why Greg suddenly gave her a wild night of passion, she has doubts on her ability to attract him anymore.
5	5	"Father-in-Law"	Andrew D. Weyman	Alan Kirschenbaum & Gregory Thomas Garcia	October 30, 2000	1AEJ02	13.17
When Kim and Christine's father visits, it brings resentment from Greg over the way he is always been treated by his father-in-law. First appearance of: Don Ludke (Dan Hedaya)
6	6	"Greg's Big Day"	Richard Correll	Diane Burroughs & Joey Gutierrez	November 6, 2000	1AEJ08	14.56
After Greg chooses to go partying with Jimmy for his birthday instead of to Disneyland with Kim and the kids, a chance meeting with Poison's Bret Michaels teaches Greg a lesson about his priorities. Guest Star: Bret Michaels as himself
7	7	"Look Who's Not Talking"	Mark Cendrowski	Jane Milmore & Billy Van Zandt	November 13, 2000	1AEJ05	13.52
Jimmy schemes to broker peace when a fight between Kim and Christine over parenting styles starts to affect him and Greg.
8	8	"Jimmy Gets a Job"	Gail Mancuso	Diane Burroughs & Joey Gutierrez	November 20, 2000	1AEJ11	14.15
Jimmy looks for a job at Greg's movie studio to pay him back for throwing a birthday party for Dominic. Kim is exasperated by Dominic's lack of attention to the party guests.
9	9	"Arm-prins"	Gail Mancuso	Alan Kirschenbaum & Gregory Thomas Garcia	November 27, 2000	1AEJ10	12.83
Greg is left to take care of Sammy himself while Kim is at a craft fair selling her sleeve guards. Worse, Sammy watches Blue's Clues over and over again, and Greg must find a way out of having to watch the same Blue's Clues episode repeatedly. Meanwhile, the Hughes go to watch Jimmy at the security guards' softball game. Guest Star: Steve Burns as himself
10	10	"Talk Time"	Jeff Meyer	Erika Kaestle & Douglas Lieblein	December 4, 2000	1AEJ12	13.31
The Warners take a wine-tasting class to give themselves something to talk about with other couples besides their kids, and convince the Hughes to attend, too.
11	11	"All I Want for Christmas Is My Dead Uncle's Cash" "Silent Night, Holy Crap"	Steven Levitan	Paige Bernhardt & Bobby Bowman	December 18, 2000	1AEJ07	13.70
When Jimmy learns that he is going to receive $5,000 as inheritance, he buys gifts for everybody and promises to repay Greg for freeloading off him, he then discovers that he only gets $2,988 due to taxes. Kim decides to take all the kids to get a picture for the grandparents, and makes them wear sailor suits.
12	12	"Where There's a Will, There's a Waiver"	Gail Mancuso	Bobby Bowman & Paige Bernhardt	January 8, 2001	1AEJ09	13.66
The Warners' feud with a neighbor endangers the Hughes' ability to stay in the guest house when it is learned their residency there violates the property's zoning unless he agrees to sign a waiver. Guest Star: Dan Castellaneta as Walt
13	13	"Jimmy's Jimmy"	Mark Cendrowski	Diane Burroughs & Joey Gutierrez	January 29, 2001	1AEJ13	15.34
The houseguests have houseguests when a friend of Jimmy's visits and camps out in the Warners' backyard.
14	14	"Kiss and Yell"	Mark Cendrowski	Alan Kirschenbaum & Gregory Thomas Garcia	February 5, 2001	1AEJ14	14.49
Lists of all the people the Warners and Hughes have kissed cause trouble when Christine learns that when she and Jimmy were dating, Kim kissed him. Meanwhile, Greg is insulted that Kim does not believe he has kissed as many people as he claims.
15	15	"The Big Snip"	Jeff Meyer	Dan Cross & David Hoge	February 12, 2001	1AEJ18	12.76
After a pregnancy scare, Christine hands down an ultimatum to Jimmy—get a vasectomy, or no more sex.
16	16	"Moon Over Kindergarten"	Mark Cendrowski	Bobby Bowman & Douglas Lieblein	February 19, 2001	1AEJ17	12.35
Faced with Dominic's possible expulsion from school due to his repeatedly mooning the class, Christine decides to home-school him.
17	17	"Doctor, Doctor"	Mark Cendrowski	Michael Feldman	February 26, 2001	1AEJ16	12.91
Greg and Kim are uneasy about the youthful new pediatrician who bought their retiring pediatrician's practice.
18	18	"Greg: Don't Leave Home Without Him"	Richard Correll	Paige Bernhardt & Erika Kaestle	March 12, 2001	1AEJ19	14.56
A trip with the family to his in-laws sends Greg's patience past his breaking point.
19	19	"The Daddies Group"	Mark Cendrowski	Diane Burroughs & Joey Gutierrez	March 19, 2001	1AEJ03	13.87
After Kim guilts Greg into attending church and joining its Daddies Groups, he makes a pleasantly surprising discovery about the group's real purpose.
20	20	"Mr. Fix It"	Jay Kleckner	Story by : Carol Blankenship; Teleplay by : Gregory Thomas Garcia	April 9, 2001	1AEJ20	13.68
Kim regrets egging Christine into going to jury duty when she has to take care of the rambunctious Dominic and Logan. Meanwhile, Jimmy's mother comes to help, but is not of much assistance at all.
21	21	"Kim Just Wants to Have Fun"	Michael Zinberg	Alan Kirschenbaum & Gregory Thomas Garcia	April 16, 2001	1AEJ15	11.98
Uptight Kim has trouble letting loose and relaxing at a bar until Jimmy helps her overcome her fear of what people will think.
22	22	"No Room to Spare"	John Tracy	Diane Burroughs & Joey Gutierrez	April 30, 2001	1AEJ21	10.98
After Billy is fired from his role on The District, Jimmy talks Greg into hiring him to redo their bathroom — a decision Greg soon regrets.
23	23	"Worst in Show"	Alan Kirschenbaum	Gregory Thomas Garcia	May 7, 2001	1AEJ22	11.66
When Kim overrules Greg and lets Jimmy take in his childhood dog, Happy, he is taken aback by how much more aggressive the dog is than he remembers. Meanwhile, Greg buys a go-kart to spite Kim for allowing a dog on the property.
24	24	"Jimmy and the Amazing Technicolor Dream Boat"	Mark Cendrowski	Bobby Bowman & Jamie Rhonheimer	May 14, 2001	1AEJ23	10.53
Jimmy makes $3,000 after Greg agrees to let him fix the old minivan, handle the sale, and keep the profit over the expected trade-in from the dealer. He then ignores Greg's advice to invest and buys a shabby used boat—which he promptly parks in the yard.

=== Season 2 (2001–02) ===
No. overall	No. in season	Title	Directed by	Written by	Original release date	Prod. code	U.S. viewers (millions)
25	1	"Who's on First"	Mark Cendrowski	Bobby Bowman & Jamie Rhonheimer	September 24, 2001	2AEJ02	15.18
The Hughes and Warners take different approaches to potty training their children. Jimmy tries to use an electronics store's return policy to his advantage.
26	2	"Christine's Journey"	Alan Kirschenbaum	Diane Burroughs & Joey Gutierrez	October 1, 2001	2AEJ01	14.35
Clueless at the gym, Greg lets Jimmy be his trainer. With Logan in daycare, Christine decides to find a part-time job.
27	3	"Guarding Greg"	Jeff Meyer	Linda Videtti Figueiredo & Erika Kaestle	October 8, 2001	2AEJ04	14.11
Jimmy invites all his security guard friends to a poker game in the guesthouse. He neglects to invite Greg, because Greg does not know any of his friends. Greg finds out and feels bad, so Christine makes Jimmy invite him. Greg returns the favor and invites them to stop by his office sometime, but regrets his offer when they take advantage of it.
28	4	"Baby Fight Club"	Mark Cendrowski	Erik Shapiro & Patrick McCarthy	October 15, 2001	2AEJ03	15.72
Jimmy convinces Greg that the way to cure Sammy's overly aggressive behavior is to set up a fight against a bigger kid.
29	5	"The Ticket"	John Tracy	Peter Noah	October 22, 2001	2AEJ05	14.44
Greg receives a ticket from a red light camera from when Jimmy borrowed his car without asking. A borrowed camera gives Kim a new view into Christine and Jimmy's life. Guest Appearance: Bob Barker as himself
30	6	"Halloween"	Mark Cendrowski	Story by : Jane Milmore & Billy Van Zandt; Teleplay by : Alan Kirschenbaum	October 29, 2001	2AEJ07	13.89
Greg plots revenge on Halloween after a man scares Sammy on purpose, and the Hughes and Kim each have their own ideas on how he should get it.
31	7	"The Good Dad"	Mark Cendrowski	Erika Kaestle & Linda Videtti Figueiredo	November 5, 2001	2AEJ08	14.25
Greg feels neglectful when he meets a father who spends more time with his kids than he does. Christine tries to give a slacker a glimpse into what life is like without a degree.
32	8	"Kentucky Top Hat"	Andrew Tsao	Diane Burroughs & Joey Gutierrez	November 12, 2001	2AEJ09	14.21
Greg has a crisis of conscience when he finds an invitation to his wedding which he never delivered—and which caused the end of one of Kim's friendships. Meanwhile, Jimmy starts to feel neglected when Christine spends time studying for college.
33	9	"Guess Who's Not Coming to Dinner"	Jeff Meyer	Bobby Bowman & Michael Pennie	November 19, 2001	2AEJ10	14.64
With Kim and Greg off to see his parents, Jimmy invites his parents for Thanksgiving, and they take it upon themselves to bring along his aunt, grandmother, and criminal cousin.
34	10	"Are We There Yet?"	John Tracy	Gregory Thomas Garcia	November 26, 2001	2AEJ11	16.55
Jimmy and Christine surprise Kim and Greg with a trip to the Grand Canyon—but they are coming along, and reveal the trip is in an old RV.
35	11	"A Complicated Plot"	Jeff Meyer	Gregory Thomas Garcia	December 17, 2001	2AEJ13	17.29
Christmas brings out competitive urges as Greg's and Kim's parents fight to get more of Sammy's attention.
36	12	"One Fish, Two Fish, Dead Fish, Blue Fish"	John Tracy	Gregory Thomas Garcia	January 7, 2002	2AEJ06	15.62
When a fish won at a carnival dies the next day, Kim and Greg disagree over how to break it to Sammy.
37	13	"You're Out... of Dreams"	Mark Cendrowski	Story by : Fred Shafferman & Neil Lebowitz; Teleplay by : Erik Shapiro & Patrick McCarthy	January 14, 2002	2AEJ15	14.67
Christine, realizing how much Jimmy has supported her return to college, encourages him to attempt his dream of becoming a baseball umpire. A neighbor who bakes and knits for Greg irks Kim.
38	14	"Favorite Son"	Jay Kleckner	Bobby Bowman & Jamie Rhonheimer	January 28, 2002	2AEJ12	12.44
The Hughes are miffed when a nursery school teacher dotes on Sammy, but ignores their Logan.
39	15	"Walk Like a Man"	Mark Cendrowski	David Hoge & Dan Cross	February 4, 2002	2AEJ14	13.31
Greg is ashamed when a frightened Sammy runs to Jimmy instead of him during a thunderstorm, and sets out to prove he is a man, too. Guest Appearance: Bill Goldberg as the big guy
40	16	"Greg's New Friend"	John Tracy	Michael A. Mariano	February 25, 2002	2AEJ16	14.22
When Kim makes a new friend, she forces Greg to be friends with her husband. Meanwhile, Jimmy suggests he and Christine camp out at college to start the registration line and ensure she gets the classes she needs.
41	17	"Room for Improvement"	John Tracy	Bobby Bowman & Michael Pennie	March 4, 2002	2AEJ17	15.67
After a spare room in Kim and Greg's house is converted into a bedroom for Dominic, he starts attacking Greg while sleep-walking.
42	18	"Johnny Ampleseed"	Ken Whittingham	Story by : Fred Shafferman & Neil Lebowitz; Teleplay by : Alan Kirschenbaum	March 25, 2002	2AEJ18	17.07
When Greg's ex-girlfriend and her husband visit, they ask him to be a sperm donor.
43	19	"Dances with Couch"	Mark Cendrowski	Gregory Thomas Garcia	April 8, 2002	2AEJ19	12.08
Jimmy becomes jealous after Greg and Dominic bond after going to Indian Scouts meetings together. Billy tries to foist his nephew off on Kim and Christine.
44	20	"Greg's Promotion"	Mark Cendrowski	Diane Burroughs & Joey Gutierrez	April 15, 2002	2AEJ20	10.06
When Greg receives a promotion at the movie studio, he agonizes over whether he got it based on merit, or because Jimmy hit a game-winning home run for the studio softball team. Meanwhile, the stress of final exams has Christine smoking again.
45	21	"The Ring"	John Tracy	Gregory Thomas Garcia & Alan Kirschenbaum	April 22, 2002	2AEJ21	11.06
Greg is in hot water after Kim finds out her engagement ring was originally bought for another woman. Jimmy becomes jealous of a foot bath he bought for Christine.
46	22	"Jimmy's Got Balls"	Mark Cendrowski	Erik Shapiro & Patrick McCarthy	April 29, 2002	2AEJ23	11.73
After Jimmy is insulted that the Warners' will would give him custody of Sammy, but not the life insurance in his benefit, Kim helps him start a golf-ball retrieval business to prove his fiscal capability.
47	23	"Vegas Vacation"	Mark Cendrowski	Gregory Thomas Garcia	May 6, 2002	2AEJ24	11.99
When his mother unexpectedly brings his father along during her visit, Greg and Jimmy take him to Las Vegas, leaving her to share too much information with Kim and Christine. Note: This is the last episode that Logan is played by Christopher and Nicholas Berry.
48	24	"Making Baby"	Jeff Meyer	Story by : Kristine Carey & Michael Carey; Teleplay by : Bobby Bowman & Gregory Thomas Garcia	May 13, 2002	2AEJ22	11.91
Kim wants another baby, but Greg is reluctant to try unless she will agree that they will stop at two children. Meanwhile, Jimmy and Christine take advantage of some charitable missionaries.

=== Season 3 (2002–03) ===
No. overall	No. in season	Title	Directed by	Written by	Original release date	Prod. code	U.S. viewers (millions)
49	1	"Spanks, But No Spanks"	Mark Cendrowski	Bobby Bowman & Michael Pennie	September 23, 2002	3AEJ01	15.03
Jimmy and Christine debate whether or not they should use spanking to punish Dominic for continuing to tell lies.
50	2	"Nitpicking"	Mark Cendrowski	David Duclon	September 30, 2002	3AEJ02	14.43
When Dominic comes home from a sleepover with an unwanted gift—head lice—an ashamed Jimmy and Christine keep quiet, but they quickly spread throughout the family, and beyond. Note: From here until "Jimmy Saves the Day", Logan is played by Alexander and Shawn Shapiro.
51	3	"Sammy's Independence Day"	John Tracy	Danny Smith & Chris Sheridan	October 7, 2002	3AEJ04	13.77
Greg and Kim consider if they are being overprotective of Sammy.
52	4	"House of the Rising Son"	John Tracy	Erika Kaestle & Michael A. Mariano	October 14, 2002	3AEJ05	14.71
Jimmy's father visits and asks him to move back home. Greg ignores Kim's advice when he goes shopping for a new car.
53	5	"Kim's New Nanny"	Jeff Meyer	Patrick McCarthy & Erik Shapiro	October 21, 2002	3AEJ06	14.44
Kim's quick decision to hire an elderly nanny out of pity haunts her. Jimmy buys Dominic a toy robot dog, which Jimmy inadvertently breaks. Guest Star: Betty White as Sylvia
54	6	"Mr. Big Shot"	Jeff Meyer	Danny Smith	October 28, 2002	3AEJ07	15.06
Greg's resentment over denying himself luxuries due to Jimmy's lack of money boils to the surface during a family trip to Lake Tahoe.
55	7	"Wife Swapping"	Ed. Weinberger	Chris Sheridan	November 4, 2002	3AEJ08	14.01
Housebound Kim and Jimmy get jealous when Greg and Christine have to spend time together, and end up enjoying it.
56	8	"Make Every Second Count"	Mark Cendrowski	Linda Videtti Figueiredo & Jamie Rhonheimer	November 11, 2002	3AEJ10	14.24
When Kim and Greg worry about treating their impending second child as well as their first, Christine and Jimmy realize they have almost no photos or videos of Logan, in contrast to Dominic's well-documented first years. Determined to create a family memory, they take the kids to a concert where Jimmy tries to get Logan on stage to dance with The Wiggles. Guest Stars: The Wiggles as themselves, Paul Paddick as Captain Feathersword
57	9	"Jimmy Saves the Day"	Mark Cendrowski	Erik Shapiro & Patrick McCarthy	November 18, 2002	3AEJ03	13.55
Christine worries for Jimmy's safety after he captures a stalker in Heidi Klum's trailer. Kim takes action to combat Greg's increasing dependence on nasal spray. Guest Stars: Heidi Klum as herself, Sam Rubin as himself Note: This is the last episode where Logan is played by Alexander and Shawn Shapiro.
58	10	"We're Having a Baby"	Mark Cendrowski	Gregory Thomas Garcia & Alan Kirschenbaum	November 25, 2002	3AEJ11	14.06
TLC's A Baby Story documents the days leading to the birth of Kim and Greg's new baby—a baby that everyone has an opinion on the naming of. Note: Starting with this episode, Logan is now played by Brendon Baerg.
59	11	"Home Is Where the Heart Isn't"	Mark Cendrowski	Bobby Bowman & Jamie Rhonheimer	December 16, 2002	3AEJ12	13.22
Kim guilts Greg into taking the two weeks paternity leave he is entitled to, but has no interest in taking. Meanwhile, a "use 'em or lose 'em" sick day policy makes Jimmy play hooky from work.
60	12	"Trophy Husband"	Jeff Meyer	Bobby Bowman & Michael Pennie	January 6, 2003	3AEJ09	14.86
Jimmy hurts Dominic's feelings when he states the school should not have given him trophies for coming in last at school Olympics events. Kim regrets allowing Greg to pick out a new couch on his own when he inadvertently keeps moving furniture to face away from the fourth wall.
61	13	"Space Jam"	John Tracy	Erika Kaestle & Jamie Rhonheimer	January 20, 2003	3AEJ14	14.47
When a space crunch sees the wives demanding their husbands toss out what they consider junk, Greg rents a storage unit and creates a secret guys' hang-out.
62	14	"Let's Get Jaggy with It"	Mark Cendrowski	Gregory Thomas Garcia	February 3, 2003	3AEJ16	14.80
Greg's parents come to visit when Tom gets a walk-on role on JAG, leaving Kim at home, and miserable, with the judgmental Natalie.
63	15	"House of Cards"	Mark Cendrowski	Bobby Bowman & Linda Videtti Figueiredo	February 10, 2003	3AEJ15	14.01
Jimmy finds himself in hot water on Valentine's Day after his responding to Christine's prodding for more romance only makes her madder.
64	16	"Hustlin' Hughes"	Mark Cendrowski	Story by : Douglas Lieblein; Teleplay by : Patrick McCarthy & Erik Shapiro	February 17, 2003	3AEJ17	12.94
Jimmy arranges for Ernie Banks, Johnny Bench and Frank Robinson to visit his father, who claims to have coached them in the minor leagues, but the reunion is not what he expected. Guest Stars: Ernie Banks, Johnny Bench, Frank Robinson as Themselves
65	17	"Flirtin' with Disaster"	Jay Kleckner	Bobby Bowman & Michael A. Mariano	February 24, 2003	3AEJ18	15.36
When nobody believes Greg that his beautiful, new female co-worker has been flirting with him, he sets up a hidden cam to catch her in the act. Meanwhile, Billy dreams of being a masseur, but has trouble convincing his co-workers to let him practice on them.
66	18	"Savitsky's Beach House"	John Tracy	Erik Shapiro & Patrick McCarthy	March 10, 2003	3AEJ13	13.47
Kim throws a surprise party at Savitsky's beach house for Greg's birthday, but Greg cannot have a good time, fearful that Jimmy and Christine will somehow ruin the house.
67	19	"March Madness"	Jeff Meyer	Bobby Bowman & Danny Smith	March 31, 2003	3AEJ20	13.65
Greg gets tickets to the NCAA Final Four, but they conflict with an 80th birthday party for Kim and Christine's grandmother. Guest Star: Jim Nantz as himself
68	20	"Good Squirrel Hunting"	Jeff Meyer	Story by : Michelle Stoker; Teleplay by : Gregory Thomas Garcia	April 14, 2003	3AEJ19	13.73
Greg tries to capture a squirrel who is leaving peanuts, which could endanger the allergic Sammy, in the back yard.
69	21	"Jimmy's Dumb"	Jeff Meyer	Steve Callaghan	April 28, 2003	3AEJ21	12.42
Jimmy feels dumb when he is unable to help Dominic with his science project, and decides to take a sixth-grade science class. Meanwhile, Greg buys a sit-down lawn mower at a yard sale, and takes it upon himself to start mowing his neighbors' lawns for free, angering local kids who mow for money.
70	22	"Sorority Girl"	Mark Cendrowski	Bobby Bowman & Michael Pennie	May 5, 2003	3AEJ23	12.62
Christine's desire to fit in better at school leads her to join a sorority, which in turn leads Jimmy to beg her to come home so he does not have to take care of the kids. Guest Stars: Danielle Fishel as Katie, Jodie Sweetin as Jodie Holguin
71	23	"Savitsky's Tennis Club"	Mark Cendrowski	Chris Sheridan	May 12, 2003	3AEJ24	12.28
After Mr. Savitsky's wife hits it off with Christine, Greg becomes desperate to fit in when Jimmy and Christine, but not he and Kim, get invited by Mr. Savitsky to his tennis club.
72	24	"When Jimmy Met Greggy"	Mark Cendrowski	Gregory Thomas Garcia & Alan Kirschenbaum	May 19, 2003	3AEJ22	12.04
The days when Jimmy and Greg first met are recounted, including Jimmy trying to stop Kim from dating Greg. Guest Appearance: Pat Morita as Karate Master

=== Season 4 (2003–04) ===
No. overall	No. in season	Title	Directed by	Written by	Original release date	Prod. code	U.S. viewers (millions)
73	1	"Natural Born Delinquents"	Mark Cendrowski	Danny Smith & Michael Pennie	September 22, 2003	4AEJ01	11.51
Greg plays tough uncle when Jimmy and Christine are not as strict with Dominic and Logan as he would like.
74	2	"Hooked on Comics"	Mark Cendrowski	Patrick McCarthy & Jamie Rhonheimer	September 29, 2003	4AEJ02	11.79
Greg and Jimmy take Tom to a convention for his new passion in retirement—comic books. When a person think Emily is a boy, Natalie jumps at the chance to once again criticize Kim.
75	3	"Spare Parts"	Mark Cendrowski	Chris Sheridan & Michael Pennie	October 6, 2003	4AEJ03	10.02
After seeing him help Billy get an audition, Jimmy begs a reluctant Greg to ask Savitsky to listen to his movie pitch.
76	4	"Speed Dating"	Miguel Higuera	Danny Smith & Erika Kaestle	October 13, 2003	4AEJ04	10.93
Greg competes with Jimmy to see who can score more interested women via speed dating.
77	5	"Big Brother-in-Law"	Alan Kirschenbaum	Linda Videtti Figueiredo	October 20, 2003	4AEJ05	11.43
When Jimmy gets accepted as a contestant on Big Brother, the thought of him and Christine having enough money to get their own place makes Greg takes drastic measures to see to it that Jimmy wins. Meanwhile, Christine realizes Jimmy's absence has resulted in calmer children. Guest Appearance: Julie Chen and various contestants from Big Brother seasons 1-4.
78	6	"Dominic's Buddy"	Jeff Meyer	Bobby Bowman & Michael A. Mariano	October 27, 2003	4AEJ06	12.17
Jimmy's unorthodox punishment for Dominic, who was bullying a nerd at school, backfires. Meanwhile, Greg and Kim try role-playing in the bedroom.
79	7	"Legoland"	Mark Cendrowski	Bobby Bowman & Linda Videtti Figueiredo	November 3, 2003	4AEJ07	11.36
Dejected over Sammy's preference to spend time with Jimmy during Take Your Kid to Work Day, Greg plans to one-up Jimmy in the 'fun dad' department by taking the kids to Legoland.
80	8	"The Day of the Dolphin"	Mark Cendrowski	Ralph Greene & Erika Kaestle	November 10, 2003	4AEJ08	11.68
Greg is less than thrilled with Kim's latest thoughtful birthday gift to him. Meanwhile, Jimmy plans to go to extremes to get even with an old flame who dumped him.
81	9	"Jimmy and Chuck"	Mark Cendrowski	Patrick McCarthy & Jamie Rhonheimer	November 17, 2003	4AEJ09	12.53
Chuck Norris follows Jimmy to research his upcoming role as a security guard, and Jimmy discovers he is not what he expected him to be like. Guest Star: Chuck Norris as himself
82	10	"A Bunch of Ice Holes"	Jeff Meyer	Jamie Rhonheimer & Patrick McCarthy	November 24, 2003	4AEJ10	11.59
Jimmy injuring his back making out with Christine throws a wrench into Don's plans to take him on a father-son ice-fishing tournament. Meanwhile, Kim's housesitting job becomes a vacation for the rest of the family, and their friends.
83	11	"Pimpin' Ain't Easy"	Jay Kleckner	Bobby Bowman	December 15, 2003	4AEJ11	11.56
Greg makes an unhappy Kim be Mr. Savitsky's "escort" to an art gallery, but then becomes unhappy himself when Kim gains her own personal reasons for continuing the charade. Meanwhile, when Logan learns that all of his clothes once belonged to Dominic, he decides to protest hand-me-downs by dressing only in his underwear.
84	12	"Who Done It?"	Jeff Meyer	Patrick McCarthy & Jamie Rhonheimer	January 5, 2004	4AEJ12	12.69
When the upstairs toilet overflows and soaks the living room ceiling, Greg plays detective, hoping to uncover the mystery of who broke his radio and flushed a piece of it down the toilet.
85	13	"Greg Needs a Friend"	Jeff Meyer	Story by : Deweyne Lamar Lee & Angela Yarbrough; Teleplay by : Alan Kirschenbaum	January 12, 2004	4AEJ13	11.84
Kim, Jimmy, and Christine all take it upon themselves to help Greg find a friend when he needs someone to go to a jazz festival with him, but he has trouble keeping up with his cool new friend's fast-paced lifestyle.
86	14	"Big Jimmy Babysits"	John Tracy	Bob Smiley	February 2, 2004	4AEJ14	11.66
Jimmy is upset when Greg, Kim and Christine all tell him that they do not think Big Jimmy is responsible enough to watch the kids. Christine and Jimmy spice up their love lives.
87	15	"Mama Said Knock You Out"	Mark Cendrowski	Danny Smith & Michael A. Mariano	February 9, 2004	4AEJ15	11.56
Jimmy sees a chance to get even with his tough female supervisor when he learns Christine is a menace in the boxing ring. Guest Star: Frank Stallone as Boxing Trainer/Himself
88	16	"Dead Aunt, Dead Aunt..."	John Tracy	Story by : Lindsey Garcia; Teleplay by : Gregory Thomas Garcia	February 16, 2004	4AEJ17	11.40
Greg wants to bail on a marriage encounter group Kim dragged him to, and a phone call regarding a dying aunt could be his ticket out.
89	17	"Greg and Jimmy's Criminals"	Jeff Meyer	Jamie Rhonheimer & Patrick McCarthy	February 23, 2004	4AEJ16	11.43
Mr. Savitsky assigns Greg to look after a convicted criminal as part of a work release program he unknowingly agreed to. Guest Stars: Travis Tritt as Hank and Trace Adkins as Curtis
90	18	"The Owner's Suite"	Jeff Meyer	Bobby Bowman & Michael Pennie	March 1, 2004	4AEJ18	10.32
Greg's invitation to his parents and Kim to attend a Los Angeles Lakers game in the owner's suite does not pan out the way he wanted. Guest Appearances: Jeanie Buss as herself, Gray Davis as himself
91	19	"The Premiere"	Jeff Meyer	Story by : Fred Shafferman & Neil Lebowitz; Teleplay by : Patrick McCarthy & Jamie Rhonheimer	March 22, 2004	4AEJ19	11.07
When Greg disobeys Mr. Savitsky's orders to go see the premiere of Kevin Smith's new film, Jimmy takes his and Kim's studio badges, and he and Christine go in their place—which has repercussions for Greg when Jimmy, who doesn't know what Kevin looks like, tells the director to his face that his movie is terrible. Guest Star: Kevin Smith as himself
92	20	"Kim and Gordon"	Mark Cendrowski	Gregory Thomas Garcia	April 19, 2004	4AEJ20	9.50
When Greg refuses to lend a helping hand in redecorating, Kim hires an interior decorator to design a fireplace for their living room, desperate to prove to Greg that she does not need his help.
93	21	"A List Before Dying"	Jeff Meyer	Ralph Greene & Danny Smith	May 3, 2004	4AEJ21	8.91
After a near-death experience, Jimmy finds a list he made of everything he ever wanted to do in life but did not—and plans to do everything on it while he still can, including having a song he wrote covered by John Hiatt. Guest Appearances: Dale Earnhardt Jr., Gordie Howe, Fabio, John Hiatt as themselves
94	22	"Couples Therapy"	Mark Cendrowski	Christopher Vane	May 10, 2004	4AEJ22	9.37
When Kim invites hers and Christine's mutual friends (a marriage counselor and his wife) over for a dinner party, and tries to get rid of Christine, Christine schemes to trash the event—and forces Jimmy to join her.
95	23	"Shirley Cooks with Love"	Jeff Meyer	Gregory Thomas Garcia	May 17, 2004	4AEJ24	8.25
Greg surprises Jimmy and Christine with a wedding video for their anniversary, but the trip down memory lane is not a happy one for anyone.
96	24	"Living with Savitsky"	Mark Cendrowski	Erika Kaestle & Chris Sheridan	May 24, 2004	4AEJ23	10.42
Jimmy's kind gesture of chauffeuring Mr. Savitsky, whose driver's license was revoked, is repaid in full when Mr. Savitsky invites him, Christine and the kids to come live in his guest house. But they all soon find out how much living with Mr. Savitsky is like living with Mr. Warner.

=== Season 5 (2005) ===
No. overall	No. in season	Title	Directed by	Written by	Original release date	Prod. code	U.S. viewers (millions)
97	1	"I Wish That I Had Sammy's Girl"	Mark Cendrowski	Gregory Thomas Garcia	February 16, 2005	5AEJ01	8.77
Competitiveness gets the better of Greg and Kim and Jimmy and Christine after Sam's new girlfriend "dumps" him for Logan.
98	2	"Jimmy Has Changed"	Jeff Meyer	Story by : Kimberly Joy Kessler & Michelle Wendt; Teleplay by : Ralph Greene & Michael Pennie	February 23, 2005	5AEJ03	9.00
When Jimmy comes down with a case of the sweats and a decreased interest in sex, he goes to the doctor (Kurt Fuller), who diagnoses him with andropause (male menopause) -- which leaves him feeling insecure about his masculinity.
99	3	"Headshot"	Jeff Meyer	Perry Rein & Gigi McCreery	March 2, 2005	5AEJ02	9.93
When Logan learns how to read before Sam, Jimmy and Christine confess to each other that they were both responsible for causing blunt head trauma to Sam when he was an infant—and are now worried that they are the reason he cannot read.
100	4	"High School Reunion"	Jeff Meyer	Erika Kaestle & Patrick McCarthy	March 9, 2005	5AEJ04	9.08
At the gang's high school reunion, Greg plays along after he gets mistaken for one of the cool kids, but Jimmy is jealous when Greg's stolen identity threatens to challenge his bid for "Coolest Guy." Meanwhile, Kim schemes to get her high school stalker interested in her again. And a dirty, old teacher is still interested in Christine.
101	5	"Greg's New Assistant"	Jeff Meyer	Story by : Deweyne Lamar Lee & Angela Yarbrough; Teleplay by : Bob Smiley & Jamie Rhonheimer	March 16, 2005	5AEJ05	10.41
Christine goes to work for Greg as his personal assistant, but she finds the job entails being Kim's personal assistant, too.
102	6	"Won't Ask, Won't Tell"	Jeff Meyer	Ralph Greene & Erika Kaestle & Patrick McCarthy	March 30, 2005	5AEJ11	9.66
When Christine finds out Jimmy has been tuning her out over the phone, she joins forces with Kim, and they concoct a scheme to get even.
103	7	"The New Neighbors"	Jeff Meyer	Erika Kaestle & Patrick McCarthy	April 6, 2005	5AEJ07	9.68
Jimmy and Christine strive to move out of Greg's guesthouse and into the newly vacated place next door, but when Greg hits it off with an upper-class couple who are also prospective buyers, he hopes they become his new neighbors and not the Hughes. Guest Stars: Alan Thicke as Joel and Shelley Long as Margaret
104	8	"Tree Hugger"	Jeff Meyer	Bobby Bowman	April 13, 2005	5AEJ08	7.27
Greg and Jimmy have a not-so-neighborly war over Jimmy wanting to cut down a lemon tree in his backyard that Greg is attached to.
105	9	"Senior Olympics"	Jeff Meyer	Jamie Rhonheimer	April 20, 2005	5AEJ12	8.64
When Tom comes to town to participate in a senior fencing match and Big Jimmy has also shown up to help the Hughes with their house, Big Jimmy throws his hat into the ring and challenges Tom to a duel.
106	10	"A Little Breathing Room"	Jeff Meyer	Michael Pennie	April 25, 2005	5AEJ09	8.74
Christine wants to make new friends after she overhears Kim telling Greg that she and Jimmy have been spending too much time over at the Warner house instead of their own. Meanwhile, Greg and Kim make new friends that they want to get rid of.
107	11	"Broken by the Mold"	Jeff Meyer	Story by : Hunter Covington; Teleplay by : Gregory Thomas Garcia	May 18, 2005	5AEJ13	9.45
Unable to find employment after giving up his job at Radford, Greg is forced to swallow his pride and take a position outside of the movie world. But when he finds out his house is covered in toxic mold and unfit to live in, he is unable to swallow it a second time. Note: Season 6 Episode 1 occurs before this episode. That episode was delayed due to a press conference when it was supposed to air.

=== Season 6 (2005–06) ===
No. overall	No. in season	Title	Directed by	Written by	Original release date	Prod. code	U.S. viewers (millions)
108	1	"The Radford Reshuffle"	Jay Kleckner	Bob Smiley & Michael A. Mariano	September 14, 2005	5AEJ10	4.27
The surprise firing of Mr. Savitsky leads Greg to find him working in a soup kitchen.
109	2	"Greg's a Mooch"	Mark Cendrowski	Erika Kaestle & Patrick McCarthy	September 21, 2005	6AEJ01	7.19
Realizing just how much fun being out of work can be, Greg lets Jimmy have a taste of what it is like to have someone sponge off of him for a change. Guest Appearance: David Feherty as himself.
110	3	"Dominic's First Date"	Mark Cendrowski	Erika Kaestle & Patrick McCarthy	September 28, 2005	6AEJ02	8.74
When Dominic enters the world of dating, Christine and Jimmy offer conflicting advice to their son. Meanwhile, knowledge that Kim still keeps a box of mementos from past loves drives Greg crazy.
111	4	"On Your Marks, Get Set, Mow"	Mark Cendrowski	Gigi McCreery & Perry Rein	October 5, 2005	6AEJ03	6.79
Jimmy enters the world of competitive lawn mower racing, but sadly discovers that even that is ruled by the almighty dollar. Guest Appearance: Greg Biffle as himself.
112	5	"Barbecue"	Jeff Meyer	Ralph Greene & Michael A. Mariano	October 12, 2005	6AEJ04	8.76
Greg overcomes his fear of "the 'hood" to obtain some barbecue, and when Jimmy seems fearful for him, Greg plays a practical joke to prove Jimmy is actually the insecure one.
113	6	"Jimmy from the Block"	Jeff Meyer	Eric Zicklin	October 19, 2005	6AEJ06	7.56
Envious of Jimmy and Christine's newfound neighborhood popularity, Kim throws a barbecue, where she discovers that she and Greg are not popular at all.
114	7	"Baby, Baby Not"	Jeff Meyer	Bob Stevens	November 2, 2005	6AEJ07	7.62
When Kim and Christine decide to have another baby, Greg and Jimmy take to pleading for abstinence.
115	8	"Jimmy the Teacher"	Liza Snyder	Gigi McCreery & Perry Rein	November 9, 2005	6AEJ08	8.78
Jimmy begins teaching the neighborhood kids different things that their fathers cannot, and makes a little money on the side doing it.
116	9	"Marital Aid"	Mark Cendrowski	Erika Kaestle & Patrick McCarthy	November 23, 2005	6AEJ09	8.30
Kim and Christine are unusually attentive to Greg and Jimmy after spending an evening listening to a critical husband constantly belittle his wife. The girls do not want to spend any more time with the couple, but Greg and Jimmy encourage the relationship in hopes that their good fortune with their wives will continue.
117	10	"Jimmy Sponsors a Vacation"	Mark Cendrowski	Melissa Carter & Bob Smiley	December 14, 2005	6AEJ05	7.96
Jimmy decides to treat Greg and Kim to a weekend vacation, but his "do anything to save a buck" attitude quickly puts a damper on the excitement.
118	11	"Christine the Spy"	Miguel Higuera	Bob Smiley & Melissa Carter	January 11, 2006	6AEJ10	8.40
Now working for Mr. Savitsky at a different movie studio, Jimmy and Greg want Christine, who still works for their old studio, to give up secrets about it.
119	12	"Quitters Never Dance"	Jeff Meyer	Bobby Bowman & Michael A. Mariano	January 18, 2006	5AEJ06	7.13
Christine wants Logan to learn not to be a quitter, but his father's tendency towards quitting send the wrong message.
120	13	"The Guinness World Record"	Jeff Meyer	Story by : John C. Nelson; Teleplay by : Michael A. Mariano	January 25, 2006	6AEJ11	7.38
When both his job and arcade skills seem to no longer impress Dominic, Jimmy hopes getting entry into The Guinness Book of World Records will again make him cool in his son's eyes.
121	14	"The Limo"	Jeff Meyer	Patrick McCarthy & Erika Kaestle	February 1, 2006	6AEJ12	6.70
An anniversary gift of taking their wives via a limousine to a Rascal Flatts concert goes horribly wrong, leaving Greg and Jimmy scrambling to find a way to save the night. Guest Stars: Rascal Flatts, Billy Gibbons, Vic Jacobs, and Steve Hartman as themselves
122	15	"Should I Bring a Jacket?"	Mike O'Malley	Eric Zicklin	February 15, 2006	6AEJ13	6.48
In the series finale, discovering that Kim listens to Christine and Jimmy listens to Greg, Greg and Christine take advantage and ally themselves to help each other get what they want. After Greg and Christine come clean with their wrongs, Jimmy and Greg do not talk. Greg expresses how much Jimmy has changed his life for the better and that he does not consider themselves to be brothers-in-law anymore, but actual brothers due to how close they have become. The series ends with an earthquake hitting the Warner house but does little damage. Then there's a knock on the door and the Hughes are there (implying their house has been destroyed) asking "Is the guest house okay?"
