= List of Coach episodes =

The following is an episode list for the American television sitcom Coach, which ran on ABC from February 28, 1989, to May 14, 1997, with 200 episodes in total produced, spanning nine seasons.

== Series overview ==
Season	Episodes	Originally released		Rank	Rating
Season	Episodes	First released	Last released	Rank	Rating
1	13	February 28, 1989	June 7, 1989	72	9.2
2	20	November 21, 1989	May 15, 1990	18	17.0
3	22	September 25, 1990	April 9, 1991	18	15.3
4	22	October 1, 1991	May 19, 1992	10	16.7 (Note: Tied with Room for Two.)
5	23	September 22, 1992	May 19, 1993	6	17.5
6	27	September 14, 1993	May 24, 1994	6	17.4
7	25	September 12, 1994	May 10, 1995	53	10.5
8	25	September 12, 1995	May 21, 1996	14	12.9 (Note: Tied with The NBC Monday Movie.)
9	23	September 28, 1996	May 14, 1997	64	8.1

== Episodes ==
=== Season 1 (1989) ===
No. overall	No. in season	Title	Directed by	Written by	Original release date	U.S. viewers (millions)	Rating/share (households)
1	1	"Pliot"	Barry Kemp	Barry Kemp	February 28, 1989	28.8	19.1/29
Hayden is perplexed when he learns that Kelly plans to go on a date with one of her professors. He obtains her schedule, tries to guess which professor it is, and then the meddling begins. Note: This was the second episode produced but aired first on ABC as a preview episode.
2	2	"Kelly and the Professor"	Michael Zinberg	Michael Zinberg	March 1, 1989	18.7	13.0/20
Hayden's fatherly instincts are awakened when Kelly comes back to Minnesota for college. But his relationship with Christine might be in for a change.
3	3	"Kelly, Meet Christine"	James Gardner	Barry Kemp	March 8, 1989	19.6	13.4/21
Hayden's nerves take over when he introduces Christine to Kelly. The awkward night finally ends, but now Christine is upset that Hayden was not more honest with Kelly about their relationship.
4	4	"I'm in Love with a Boy Named Stuart"	Michael Lembeck	Mark Ganzel & Sheldon Bull	March 15, 1989	15.7	10.9/17
Hayden hates Kelly's new boyfriend, Stuart (Kris Kamm), a sensitive theater arts major. But when the team mascot suddenly quits, Hayden must find a replacement. He turns to Stuart for help.
5	5	"The Loss Weekend"	Michael Zinberg	Sheldon Bull	March 22, 1989	18.2	12.5/20
It is going to be a great weekend for Hayden! Kelly will be in the stands cheering for his team and Christine is going to spend the weekend with him at the cabin. But the weekend goes up in smoke when his team loses for the third straight time.
6	6	"Gambling for Meat"	James Gardner	John Peaslee & Judd Pillot	April 5, 1989	15.1	10.9/18
Hayden's team suffers a humiliating loss. At The Touchdown Club, Luther wins a free dinner for correctly guessing the score. To avoid NCAA sanctions, Hayden must suspend Luther.... which is only the beginning of his troubles with his assistant coach. Note: This episode features the first appearance by Kenneth Kimmins as Minnesota State's athletic director Howard Burleigh.
7	7	"19 Candles"	Arlene Sanford	Judd Pillot & John Peaslee	April 12, 1989	14.9	10.7/17
To celebrate Kelly's 19th birthday, Hayden plans the usual – dinner out for the two of them. But when Kelly brings Stuart, Hayden's mood changes and the night disintegrates into anger and tears.
8	8	"Parents' Weekend"	James Gardner	Don Rhymer	April 19, 1989	14.1	10.6/18
Hayden's homely ex-wife, Beth (Lenore Kasdorf), is coming for Parents' Weekend. Hayden has not told Beth about Christine because he did not want to upset her, but when a newly slim and attractive Beth shows up, Christine is the one who is nervous.
9	9	"I'm Sorry I Told You My Wife Was Dead"	John P. Whitesell II	Judd Pillot & John Peaslee	April 26, 1989	14.7	10.7/17
The team's most ardent – and wealthy – fan dies, and Hayden expects a sizable donation from his will. But when the widow Pamela Rizzendough (Priscilla Morrill) decides to give the money to medical research, Hayden resorts to telling a series of lies to convince her to donate the money to Minnesota State's athletic department. Note: This episode features the first appearance by Beth Grant as Martha.
10	10	"Define Romance"	Andrew Chulack	Sean Clark	May 3, 1989	12.2	9.4/15
Christine invites Hayden to the opera, but he declines, leaving the door open for her to invite someone else. Hayden is jealous, but Christine says she has a right.... unless he opts to define their relationship.
11	11	"Whose Team Is It, Anyway?"	Arlene Sanford	Sheldon Bull	May 17, 1989	13.4	9.7/16
Hayden's team has a chance at a winning season... if they beat their last opponent. But this goal is threatened when their star player decides he is more important than the team and stops abiding by the team rules.
12	12	"Hoot, Hoot Hike"	Michael Lembeck	John Peaslee & Judd Pillot	May 31, 1989	11.7	8.3/15
Kelly's new dance instructor Madame Roola (Natalia Nogulich) creates a ballet around the passion of football and asks Hayden to be her technical advisor. He quickly discovers her ulterior motive for enlisting his participation.
13	13	"Dauber's Blow-Out"	Michael T. Vetrie	Story by : Sean Clark; Teleplay by : Don Rhymer	June 7, 1989	10.4	7.7/14
It is the end of the season and Dauber plans to hold his annual out-of-control celebration. But Riley Pringle (Raye Birk), the band director and notoriously prickly head of the conduct committee, has an alternate plan to keep everyone in line.

=== Season 2 (1989–90) ===
No. overall	No. in season	Title	Directed by	Written by	Original release date	U.S. viewers (millions)
14	1	"I Don't Know Much About Art, But I Know What Makes Me Mad"	John P. Whitesell II	Sheldon Bull	November 21, 1989	28.4
The picture is not pretty when Hayden refuses to attend an art exhibit with Christine. Luther goes with her instead, and actually has some appreciation for it, annoying Hayden.
15	2	"Dauber's Got a Girl"	John P. Whitesell II	Miriam Trogdon	November 28, 1989	26.6
The game of love is complicated for Dauber when he falls for the coach of Minnesota State's women's basketball team – who also happens to be Hayden's archenemy. Note: This episode introduces the recurring character of Judy Watkins, played by Pam Stone.
16	3	"Bring Me the Head of Stuart Rosebrock"	Michael Lembeck	Sheldon Bull	December 5, 1989	26.0
When Stuart and Kelly break-up, Hayden is initially thrilled, but he quickly realizes that he needs Stuart to help him convince Kelly to stay in school.
17	4	"If a Coach Falls in the Woods"	Michael Lembeck	Judd Pillot & John Peaslee	December 12, 1989	26.1
In the conclusion of the two-part episode, Hayden refuses to attend Stuart and Kelly's impromptu wedding. Everyone tries to convince him otherwise, but it may be the most unlikely of people to save the day: Luther, who says he's an example of what not to end up as in life. Unfortunately, Luther also gets Hayden stranded in a forest fire lookout tower - so with the minister (John Ingle) anxious to get to his next wedding on time, Hayden might not be able to make it back in time. Note: This episode sees the return of Lenore Kasdorf as Beth Fox and Beth Grant as Martha. James Staley and Charlotte Stewart make their first appearance as Stuart's parents, the Rosebrocks.
18	5	"If Keith Jackson Calls, I'll Be at My Therapist's"	Michael Lembeck	Mark Ganzel & Tom Palmer	December 19, 1989	24.2
Christine suggests that Hayden sees a therapist about his nervous twitch before his interview with sportscasters Keith Jackson and Bob Griese. Dauber, however, has an easier idea, through hypnosis.
19	6	"I'm in the Mood for Luther"	John P. Whitesell II	Barry Kemp & Sheldon Bull	December 26, 1989	20.1
Christine sets Luther up with a blind date, her neighbor Marion Williamson (K Callan), leading Hayden to worry that he may be broken-hearted.
20	7	"A Man and a Woman (and Two Theatre Majors)"	John P. Whitesell II	Judd Pillot & John Peaslee	January 2, 1990	28.2
Hayden and Christine try to enjoy their anniversary, but are constantly being interrupted by the arguing Kelly and Stuart.
21	8	"The Investment"	Michael Lembeck	John Peaslee & Judd Pillot	January 9, 1990	27.8
Hayden talks Luther into making an investment in The Touchdown Club, but their friendship is jeopardized by an opening-night mishap.
22	9	"I've Got a Secret"	John P. Whitesell II	Kathryn Baker	January 16, 1990	27.3
Hayden tries to keep his recruitment of a top quarterback a secret, but Christine's big mouth could ruin Hayden's team and their relationship.
23	10	"The Curley O'Brien Award"	Alan Rafkin	Tom Palmer & Mark Ganzel	January 23, 1990	29.3
Hayden fakes humility when he thinks he's won the prestigious Curley O'Brien Award, but fails to keep up the act when he loses out to a rival.
24	11	"The Rosebrocks of Wisconsin"	Michael Lembeck	Judd Pillot & John Peaslee	January 30, 1990	28.4
Hayden feels jealous of Kelly visiting her in-laws in Wisconsin, and actually appreciating it.
25	12	"Coaches Conference"	Alan Rafkin	Sheldon Bull & Barry Kemp	February 13, 1990	21.1
Hayden is overjoyed to be invited to a national coaches conference in Memphis, Tennessee, but he learns that no one is familiar with him. Luther, who is also in Memphis as a huge Elvis fan, encourages Hayden to seek recognition from noted coaches. Hayden receives a surprise talk from Hank Stram, who says there are more benefits to coaching than recognition.
26	13	"Carnival Knowledge"	Will Mackenzie	Judd Pillot & John Peaslee	February 20, 1990	23.0
Hayden teaches Christine the art of negotiation when she objects to her new contract at the TV station. Meanwhile, Judy tries to force him to volunteer at the school's fundraising carnival.
27	14	"Haven't I Slept with You Somewhere Before?"	John P. Whitesell II	Sean Clark	February 27, 1990	25.0
Hayden's job hangs in the balance when the new university president turns out to be Elaine Tewksbury (Robin Strasser), a woman he stood up after a one-night stand in Miami.
28	15	"Homewreckers"	Michael Zinberg	Kathryn Baker	March 6, 1990	26.5
When Christine leaves him alone at her newly-redecorated apartment, Hayden ends up starting a chain reaction - including a grape-juice spilling Luther, a kitchen fire and a broken front door - that trashes the place. Can he fix everything before she gets back?
29	16	"Professor Doolittle"	Tony Dow	Sheldon Bull	March 13, 1990	25.6
With football season over, Elaine Tewksbury orders Hayden to honor his contract by teaching a course on ancient history. Hayden plans to teach a Mickey Mouse course his players can easily pass, but soon learns from the department head that the syllabus requires a challenging regimen on Egypt, Greece and Rome. Note: Rob Schneider guest stars as the only non-football player to enroll in Coach Fox's history class.
30	17	"Sunshine on My Shoulder Makes Me Happy: A Show About Bird Ransom"	Jim Drake	Sean Clark	March 20, 1990	26.4
When Hayden agrees to look after Luther's parrot, the bird flies away and is subsequently held for ransom by a greedy old man (Phil Leeds).
31	18	"Kelly Girl"	Alan Rafkin	John Peaslee & Judd Pillot	April 3, 1990	22.9
Kelly volunteers to fill in as Hayden's secretary for the summer, but when she gets a dream offer to work with a theatre company, she leaves him to fend for himself. Meanwhile, Dauber starts a football camp for Pop Warner players.
32	19	"A Jerk at the Opera"	Andrew Chulack	Tom Palmer	April 17, 1990	23.8
Jealousy leads Hayden to follow Christine and an old boyfriend Jeffrey (Mike Farrell) to a restaurant, and then the opera, in disguise.
33	20	"Poodle Springs"	Tony Dow	Sean Clark	May 15, 1990	19.1
Hayden and Christine offer moral support to Dauber by going on a double date with him and Judy, who are meeting Judy's blue-blooded parents Judge R.J. Watkins (John McMartin) and Merlene Watkins (Nancy Marchand). A mishap by Dauber, Hayden and Christine put the pampered poodle of Judy's mother in jeopardy.

=== Season 3 (1990–91) ===
No. overall	No. in season	Title	Directed by	Written by	Original release date	Prod. code	U.S. viewers (millions)
34	1	"That Shouldn't Happen"	Alan Rafkin	Judd Pillot & John Peaslee	September 25, 1990	66601	21.4
Hayden braces himself for a visit from Christine's mother Mildred (Nanette Fabray), while preparing for the new season with a new star quarterback, Bo Whitley (Christopher Duncan).
35	2	"Magnificent Abscession"	Alan Rafkin	Mark Ganzel & Barry Kemp	October 2, 1990	66606	23.0
Hayden has to sit out an upcoming game after recovering from the removal of an abscessed tooth. Hayden makes Luther the acting head coach of that game and Luther is quickly overwhelmed and in way over his head. Note: This is the first episode to feature Tom Poston as dentist - and later also jeweller - Dr. Art Hibke.
36	3	"The Day That Moses Came to Town"	Alan Rafkin	Lyla Oliver	October 9, 1990	66604	24.7
Elaine Tewksbury recruits Terrence Moses (Bobby Hosea), a reputable basketball coach. Hayden, thinking this is a ploy to edge him out of his job, flies to Boston to convince Terrence's girlfriend Susan Birch (Penny Johnson) how rotten living in Minnesota is. Note: This episode's cold open features a cameo by Rick Barry as himself - the first potential new basketball coach Elaine brings in for an interview.
37	4	"Is This Your First Time on the Riverboat, Miss Watkins?"	Alan Rafkin	Sheldon Bull	October 16, 1990	66604	22.1
Hayden bets his entire life's savings in a poker game against Judy and nearly loses his common sense.
38	5	"Hayden's in the Kitchen with Dinah"	Alan Rafkin	Judd Pillot & John Peaslee	October 23, 1990	66610	23.7
Hayden stays home to nurse Christine back to health, then sneaks out to a party and returns with a tipsy woman named Dinah (Marietta DePrima).
39	6	"Hayden and Luther's Excellent Adventure"	Alan Rafkin	Sheldon Bull	October 30, 1990	66609	23.0
Hayden and Luther go on a recruiting trip the day of Christine's big awards banquet – and end up in a backwoods part of Minnesota with some dangerous elements.
40	7	"The Break-Up"	Alan Rafkin	Barry Kemp & Sheldon Bull	November 6, 1990	66611	21.7
Hayden and Christine break up after he innocently reveals to her antiquing friends (Richard Sanders and Sandy Faison) his plans for the future – because he did not mention Christine in them.
41	8	"The Iceman Goeth"	Alan Rafkin	Mark Ganzel and Judd Pillot & John Peaslee	November 13, 1990	66612	21.4
After breaking up with Christine, Hayden receives consolation – and an invitation – from an unexpected source, Elaine Tewksbury.
42	9	"Cabin Fever"	Alan Rafkin	Sheldon Bull	November 27, 1990	66613	21.7
Hoping to prove his friendship, Luther plans to buy the cabin next to Hayden's from Mr. Newbower (Henry Jones).
43	10	"Men Don't Heal"	Alan Rafkin	Mark Ganzel	December 4, 1990	66614	22.3
In an effort to get over his breakup with Christine, Hayden joins a men's support group - only to find one of its members (Stan Ivar) is now dating her. Note: Michael McManus and Ernie Sabella also guest star, as other members of the support group.
44	11	"When Hayden Met Christine"	Alan Rafkin	Sheldon Bull	December 11, 1990	66615	23.4
Hayden remembers his first meeting with Christine, when she was not exactly taken with his charm.
45	12	"Christmas Brains"	Alan Rafkin	John Peaslee & Judd Pillot	December 18, 1990	66616	23.9
Hayden's ex-wife Beth gives him the perfect Christmas gift: the knowledge that he is not a "marriage killer"... and an idea for a Christmas gift of his own that will make him feel very merry.
46	13	"Dauber Graduates"	Alan Rafkin	Judd Pillot & John Peaslee	January 8, 1991	66618	24.0
As soon as Dauber graduates, he thinks his degree has better uses. He appeals to Hayden for greater responsibility in his job, which is approved, but refuses to wash Hayden's truck, suggesting a respect issue may be at stake.
47	14	"Puppy Love"	Alan Rafkin	Mark Ganzel	January 22, 1991	66617	25.8
Hayden takes another run at wealthy widow Mrs. Rizendough (Patricia Morrill), a potential donor who loves dogs, this time pretending to have a dog of his own.
48	15	"The Marion Kind: Part 1"	Alan Rafkin	Sheldon Bull	February 5, 1991	66607	24.1
Luther tries to make an estranged friend Peter Plunkett (Dick Martin), who took his girl, eat crow at Christine's dinner.
49	16	"The Marion Kind: Part 2"	Alan Rafkin	Judd Pillot & John Peaslee	February 12, 1991	66608	23.5
Luther goes insane when he finds Peter and Marion planning to elope.
50	17	"Leonard Kraleman: All-American"	Tony Dow	Sheldon Bull	February 19, 1991	66620	24.3
Hayden is made to be academic advisor to Leonard Kraleman (Rob Schneider), a misfit who struggles to fit in. Hayden's advice causes the nerd to try out for the team.
51	18	"2 BRs, MTN VW"	Tony Dow	Seth Weisbord	February 26, 1991	66619	24.0
Christine talks Hayden into inviting Stuart and Kelly on their ski vacation, which proves to be a mistake.
52	19	"Hurley-Burleigh"	Alan Rafkin	Judd Pillot & John Peaslee	March 12, 1991	66622	25.9
Hayden tries to help Howard have fun on their trip to Vegas. When Howard wins a free dinner with a showgirl and accepts his prize, Hayden worries that he taught Howard too well. Note: This is the first episode to feature Georgia Engel as Howard's wife Shirley Burleigh.
53	20	"Hayden Fox for Universal Jocks"	Alan Rafkin	Sheldon Bull	March 26, 1991	66623	26.0
Hayden agrees to endorse a line of athletic supporters when he learns how much Christine makes.
54	21	"A Father and Son Reunion"	Alan Rafkin	Judd Pillot & John Peaslee	April 2, 1991	66624	23.0
Hayden and Christine meet Luther's long-lost father Horace Van Dam (Paul Dooley) at a sports-memorabilia shop.
55	22	"Diamonds Are a Dentist's Best Friend"	Alan Rafkin	Sheldon Bull	April 9, 1991	66625	25.8
Dentist Art Hibke offers reduced prices on diamond jewelry, allowing Hayden to buy an engagement ring for Christine. Note: For this appearance, his second as Dr. Hibke, Tom Poston would be nominated for a 1991 Outstanding Guest Actor in a Comedy Series Emmy Award.

=== Season 4 (1991–92) ===
No. overall	No. in season	Title	Directed by	Written by	Original release date	Prod. code	U.S. viewers (millions)
56	1	"The Kick-off and the Kiss-off"	Alan Rafkin	Judd Pillot & John Peaslee	October 1, 1991	67201	27.8
As happy as Hayden is to have a top-ranked team and be on the cover of Sports Illustrated, Luther is worried about the magazine's infamous curse. Meanwhile, Stuart has become a hit in Hollywood after being cast in a children's show Buzzy the Beaver, and makes an important announcement to Kelly.
57	2	"Since My Beaver Left Me"	Alan Rafkin	John Peaslee & Judd Pillot	October 8, 1991	67202	27.1
Kelly moves back after the breakup of her marriage and Hayden must deal with the fact she is more comfortable talking to Christine than to him.
58	3	"Don't Get Mad, Get Cooley"	Alan Rafkin	Nell Scovell	October 15, 1991	TBA	26.0
Hayden tries to retrieve a tape from a reporter who confronted him about a defective truck he sold to Luther.
59	4	"A Real Guy's Guy"	Alan Rafkin	Story by : Richard Raskind; Teleplay by : Judd Pillot & John Peaslee	October 29, 1991	67208	30.1
Hayden has a hard time coping with the fact that one of his players is gay.
60	5	"Any Place I Hang Myself Is Home"	Alan Rafkin	Story by : Seth Weisbord; Teleplay by : Thad Mumford	November 5, 1991	62705	26.5
Hayden fears Christine's reaction when he buys them a house on impulse.
61	6	"Requiem for a Groundskeeper"	Alan Rafkin	Nell Scovell	November 12, 1991	67211	29.1
The groundskeeper of Minnesota State dies and his will asks Hayden to sort out his affairs.
62	7	"I Think I Can't, I Think I Can't"	Alan Rafkin	Miriam Trogdon	November 19, 1991	67206	23.6
When all the flights are overbooked, Luther suggests the team see America the old-fashioned way, by train. This threatens to derail Hayden's business relationship with Luther.
63	8	"I Hate Barbara"	Alan Rafkin	Judd Pillot & John Peaslee	November 26, 1991	67215	25.9
Hayden is kicked out for making Christine's best friend Barbara (Lee Garlington) leave.
64	9	"Loonstruck"	Alan Rafkin	Warren Bell	December 3, 1991	67210	29.2
Hayden agrees to speak at the banquet of a men's lodge so Howard can be "High Loon", but everything falls through.
65	10	"The Pineapple Bowl: Part 1"	Alan Rafkin	Thad Mumford and John Peaslee & Judd Pillot	December 10, 1991	67212	23.8
"Jake the Snake" Connelly (Robert Prosky), Hayden's coach from when he was a player, comes to his last game before a bowl bid. Minnesota State wins and Hayden sees who he will be taking on in the Pineapple Bowl: his old coach.
66	11	"The Pineapple Bowl: Part 2"	Alan Rafkin	Story by : Nell Scovell; Teleplay by : John Peaslee & Judd Pillot	December 17, 1991	67213	28.0
Hayden's quarterback, Bo Whitley hurts himself at a luau just before the Pineapple Bowl.
67	12	"Rizzendough Revisited"	Alan Rafkin	Miriam Trogdon	January 7, 1992	67214	29.5
Hayden is hurt while trying to put himself on Mrs. Rizzendough's good side.
68	13	"Return of the Marriage Killer"	Alan Rafkin	Warren Bell	January 14, 1992	67216	28.0
Hayden is glad that his ex-wife Beth is re-marrying. However, after a casual conversation with Hayden, Beth's groom-to-be thinks he is too different and wants out. It is up to Hayden and Christine to give their blessing and assure the couple that they are made for each other.
69	14	"War of the Dopes"	Alan Rafkin	Nell Scovell	February 4, 1992	67217	30.1
Dauber moves into Luther's building, but the two come into conflict during a housewarming party.
70	15	"The Woodchuck, the Beaver and the Fox: A Menage a Trois"	Craig T. Nelson	John Peaslee & Judd Pillot	February 11, 1992	67218	23.8
Kelly visits the Rosebrocks and cannot handle seeing Stuart, but the real surprise is that her ex-husband is regretful.
71	16	"No Good Deed Goes Unpunished"	Alan Rafkin	Pat Dougherty	February 18, 1992	67219	27.0
Hayden and Christine attempt to aim a young woman's anger on her no-good boyfriend.
72	17	"Last of the Red-Hot Luthers"	Alan Rafkin	Judd Pillot & John Peaslee	February 25, 1992	67220	25.0
Luther comes to regret giving Alma Thorkelson (Pat Crawford Brown), Hayden's secretary, a birthday present that led to their private celebration.
73	18	"The Old Fish and the Shoes"	Alan Rafkin	Nell Scovell & Warren Bell	March 17, 1992	67222	28.6
While Luther tries to catch a legendary bass, Hayden is angry with Christine for selling something she should not have at his garage sale.
74	19	"Dateline-Bangkok"	Craig T. Nelson	Jordan Rush	April 28, 1992	67209	27.7
Hayden disapproves of Kelly dating Arthur Blackmore (John Bennett Perry), a foreign correspondent and old friend of Christine's.
75	20	"If That's Opportunity, Don't Answer"	Alan Rafkin	Bill Bryan	May 5, 1992	67223	26.9
Christine auditions for a news-anchor position in New York, but it all depends on how it affects her relationship with Hayden. Hayden does not think that is too hard considering that the network has a contract with the New York Yankees, and therefore means free tickets for him.
76	21	"Frequent Flyers, Crossed Wires"	Alan Rafkin	Warren Bell	May 12, 1992	67224	27.4
Hayden's awards banquet and Christine's premiere party are scheduled on the same night, but in different cities.
77	22	"Can We Go Home Now?"	Alan Rafkin	Nell Scovell	May 19, 1992	67225	21.2
Hayden tries to maintain a long-distance relationship with Christine, but she wants him to close the gap.

=== Season 5 (1992–93) ===
No. overall	No. in season	Title	Directed by	Written by	Original release date	Prod. code	U.S. viewers (millions)
78	1	"To Air Is Human"	Alan Rafkin	Judd Pillot & John Peaslee	September 22, 1992	68301	29.7
Hayden proposes to Christine on live TV.
79	2	"Big Brother, Little Brain"	Craig T. Nelson	Warren Bell	September 23, 1992	68305	25.4
Dauber neglects Judy when he becomes the Big Brother to a fatherless boy.
80	3	"Father of the Year"	Alan Rafkin	John Peaslee & Judd Pillot	September 29, 1992	68310	28.9
Hayden is named Father of the Year, but Kelly is not being very supportive.
81	4	"Born Luther"	Alan Rafkin	Nell Scovell	October 6, 1992	68303	28.1
Luther is tired of being second banana, so Hayden lets him meet the press after a slip-up.
82	5	"Shirley Burleigh, Girlie Friday"	Craig T. Nelson	Bob Bendetson	October 13, 1992	68304	27.7
Luther fights the people who took away his breakfast cereal while Howard hires his wife Shirley (Georgia Engel), as his secretary, much to his chagrin.
83	6	"Rizzendough Rendezvous"	Alan Rafkin	Eric Horsted	October 20, 1992	68311	24.8
Mrs. Rizzendough has a new boyfriend whom she met at a dog show. Her new beau: Luther.
84	7	"Love Me Tender"	Alan Rafkin	Elliot Stern	October 27, 1992	TBA	30.4
Luther reveals his opinion of Christine after a brush with death.
85	8	"The Bachelor Party"	Alan Rafkin	Bruce Ferber	November 10, 1992	68309	27.2
Luther is angry with Hayden for attending a bachelor roast with NFL legends Dick Butkus, Bubba Smith, Johnny Unitas and broadcaster Al Michaels instead of letting him throw a bachelor party in his honor.
86	9	"Dresswreckers"	Andre Belgrader	Teleplay by : Warren Bell & Bob Bendetson & Nell Scovell; Story by : Elliot Stern	November 17, 1992	88308	28.6
Christine asks Hayden to pick up her wedding dress. Hayden soon regrets considering it hilarious that the dressmaker is a man named Mr. Thind (Patrick Macnee).
87	10	"Vows"	Alan Rafkin	Bruce Ferber	November 25, 1992	64312	30.6
Hayden has trouble writing his vows on the eve of his and Christine's wedding.
88	11	"The Patriot Bowl"	Alan Rafkin	Warren Bell	December 2, 1992	64313	30.3
The season is over and the Screaming Eagles have been invited to play in the inaugural Patriot Bowl in Valley Forge, Pennsylvania. Hayden's connection to the American Revolution is anything but proud when players are grousing that a bowl game is meant to be in a sunny area with bikini babes, not at some old historical site in the darkness of winter. Hayden decides to take charge by cutting his star quarterback (the king of the complainers) and replace him with an inexperienced freshman (whose name he keeps forgetting – at one point he calls him "Doug Henning") to show what it really means to be a Patriot who served under General Washington.
89	12	"My True Love Gave to Me..."	Craig T. Nelson	Bud Wiser	December 16, 1992	68314	27.7
Art Hibke mislabeled Hayden and Dauber's Christmas gifts for their respective girlfriends. When Judy sees a ring, she is excited and starts announcing to everyone at the Christmas party, that her and Dauber are engaged.
90	13	"The Commercial: Part 1"	Alan Rafkin	Nell Scovell	January 6, 1993	68316	27.4
Hayden and Christine star in a commercial while Luther starts writing a screenplay.
91	14	"The Commercial: Part 2"	Alan Rafkin	Nell Scovell	January 13, 1993	68317	29.1
Hayden thinks Christine is having an affair with her co-star Daniel Carter-Dodd (Leigh J. Lawson) in the commercial.
92	15	"Buzzy Money"	Alan Rafkin	Bruce Ferber	January 27, 1993	68319	N/A
Kelly's ex is required to pay alimony, and ends up giving Kelly $50,000 due to his successful career. Hayden thinks Kelly should save for her future (or invest in the team), and is beside himself when Kelly considers donating it to charity.
93	16	"Vegas Odds"	Craig T. Nelson	Bob Bendetson	February 3, 1993	68318	28.4
Hayden and Christine try another shot at marrying when they accompany Luther to Vegas. Meanwhile, everyone in the casino watches as Luther bets $10,000 on one random spin of roulette.
94	17	"Burden of the Burleighs"	Alan Rafkin	Art Everett & Scott Buck	February 17, 1993	68315	26.2
The Burleighs think that Hayden and Christine are their new best friends.
95	18	"The Bigger They Are"	Jeff Meyer	Warren Bell	February 24, 1993	68320	23.3
One of Hayden's old players Eddie Garrett (Bob Golic) is retiring from the NFL after winning a Super Bowl, and thrills all of Minnesota State University when he speaks at an alumni dinner. Privately the MVP tells Hayden that he is retiring to seek cancer treatment. Old demons come to haunt Hayden when the NFL star says his cancer was induced from taking anabolic steroids.
96	19	"Luthario"	Alan Rafkin	Howard Bendetson	March 10, 1993	69321	29.4
Luther's memories of a Dear John letter he received during the Korean War affect his relationship with Lorraine (Elinor Donahue).
97	20	"Dirty Tricks"	Alan Rafkin	David Lesser	March 31, 1993	68307	30.3
During the off-season, Hayden indulges in his second favorite pastime: practical jokes. Judy is fed up with this and it may spill over to Dauber's business relationship with Hayden.
98	21	"About Face"	Craig T. Nelson	Eric Horsted & Nell Scovell	May 5, 1993	68322	25.4
Hayden tries to deal with the fact that Christine is considering a face lift.
99	22	"Why So Happy, Hayden?"	Alan Rafkin	Scott Buck & Art Everett & Nell Scovell	May 12, 1993	68323	24.5
Hayden attempts to recruit Tyler Roberts, the country's top high school football player, but Tyler's grandfather George (Bill Cobbs) continually has reservations about his grandson going to Minnesota State.
100	23	"One for the Road"	Alan Rafkin	Barry Kemp & Judd Pillot & John Peaslee	May 19, 1993	68324	27.0
Hayden and Christine make another attempt to wed, and choose a church from his childhood. However, they need to hurry as the church has been condemned.

=== Season 6 (1993–94) ===
No. overall	No. in season	Title	Directed by	Written by	Original release date	U.S. viewers (millions)
101	1	"Baby on Board?"	Alan Rafkin	Alan Kirschenbaum	September 14, 1993	25.5
Christine says she wants a baby just as Hayden is working to nurse his new team to victory.
102	2	"Belly of the Beast"	Craig T. Nelson	Oliver Goldstick & Phil Rosenthal	September 21, 1993	25.7
Luther's dog Quincy may have to be put down for biting Minnesota State's band leader Riley Pringle.
103	3	"Nice Job If You Can Get It"	Alan Rafkin	Jeremy Stevens	September 28, 1993	24.5
Hayden thinks he's responsible for Christine's new job as a co-host for a talk show with Carter Brooks (Robert Ridgely). Christine is angered at Hayden for making such an implication, but wonders to herself if that is not true.
104	4	"The Luck Stops Here"	Alan Rafkin	Scott Buck	October 5, 1993	26.9
Although the team is on a winning streak, Hayden believes that their luck will soon run out.
105	5	"If She Can Make It There..."	Alan Rafkin	Story by : Eric Horsted; Teleplay by : Alan Kirschenbaum	October 12, 1993	26.9
Kelly takes a job at an advertising agency in New York, and has to move there almost immediately, with her and Hayden having to say their goodbyes.
106	6	"Uneasy Riders"	Craig T. Nelson	Eric Horsted	October 26, 1993	28.1
After teasing Dauber that he does whatever Judy tells him to do, Hayden encourages Dauber to buy a motorcycle. Hayden then decides to buy one for himself, feeling he does not need to seek approval from Christine. When Christine and Judy meet for an outing, the men scramble to hide their road hogs.
107	7	"Piece O' Cake"	Tony Dow	Story by : Jeremy Stevens; Teleplay by : Jeremy Stevens & Oliver Goldstick & Phil Rosenthal	November 2, 1993	25.2
Luther becomes a father figure to Billy Walker (Jussie Smollett), a fatherless boy he befriends.
108	8	"Running on Empty"	Andre Belgrader	Martin Rips & Joseph Staretski	November 9, 1993	26.1
Hayden and Christine go to a fertility clinic.
109	9	"It Came from New York"	Alan Rafkin	Teresa O'Neill	November 16, 1993	29.4
Kelly comes home from New York a changed woman – but Hayden does not particularly like the new her.
110	10	"The Playbook"	Alan Rafkin	James L. Freedman	November 30, 1993	26.2
Dauber loses his playbook just as the team makes it to the Pioneer Bowl.
111	11	"The Pioneer Bowl"	Jeff Meyer	Martin Rips & Joseph Staretski	December 7, 1993	23.2
Luther suffers a mishap on the day of the Pioneer Bowl and is hospitalized. Luther also realizes what plays the opponents are making through their signaling, and he must somehow escape from the hospital to warn Hayden.
112	12	"Christmas of the Van Damned"	Craig T. Nelson	Jon Vandergriff	December 14, 1993	30.1
Luther finds out about a large group of relatives living in Minnesota.
113	13	"The Babywreckers"	Tony Dow	Brad Johnson	January 4, 1994	31.2
Hayden feels uneasy about watching a baby for the weekend with Christine.
114	14	"Coach for a Day: Part 1"	Craig T. Nelson	Oliver Goldstick & Phil Rosenthal	January 11, 1994	29.0
Luther is offered a job as head coach of a small college.
115	15	"Coach for a Day: Part 2"	Craig T. Nelson	Oliver Goldstick & Phil Rosenthal	January 18, 1994	29.0
Luther's first day as the head coach of Aberdeen College turns out to be his last when he treats his team to lunch, inadvertently breaking NCAA rules.
116	16	"My Cup Runneth Over"	Jeff Meyer	Martin Rips & Joseph Staretski	February 8, 1994	31.5
Hayden wears a device to help his fertility – and it ends up bursting on Christine's Valentine's Day show.
117	17	"Like Father, Like Daughter"	Alan Rafkin	Scott Buck	February 15, 1994	21.8
Hayden tries to spend time with Kelly while he's in New York to accept the Coach of the Year award.
118	18	"The Devil in Mrs. Burleigh"	Craig T. Nelson	Eric Horsted	February 22, 1994	20.0
While Howard and Hayden are out of town, Shirley tells Christine that she's falling for another man.
119	19	"Blue Chip Blues"	Alan Rafkin	Alan Kirschenbaum	March 1, 1994	25.2
Rick Williams (James Pickens Jr.), an old friend of Hayden's from his college days, is the father to one of the prominent high school quarterbacks, Johnny (Terrence Dashon Howard). Hayden is thrilled to see Johnny will be considering Minnesota State, until he says that he is not interested in playing football anymore.
120	20	"The Stand-In"	Alan Rafkin	Scott Buck	March 8, 1994	28.7
Hayden has had it with trying to increase his fertility, so he tries to talk Troy Aikman into donating sperm.
121	21	"Something Old, Something New"	Alan Rafkin	Scott Buck & Eric Horsted & Jeremy Stevens	March 22, 1994	26.0
Dauber's relationship with Judy is jeopardized by the arrival of an old flame.
122	22	"One of the Guys"	Alan Rafkin	Brad Johnson	April 5, 1994	26.2
Hayden regrets taking Christine on a fishing trip when she comes to like it so much.
123	23	"My Best Friend's Girl"	Alan Rafkin	Scott Buck & Eric Horsted	May 3, 1994	22.3
Hayden and Luther argue over Hayden's dislike of Luther's new girlfriend, Ruthanne (Rita Taggart).
124	24	"Goodbye, Mr. Putts"	Craig T. Nelson	Joseph Staretski & Jeremy Stevens	May 10, 1994	27.1
Judy challenges Hayden to a game of golf, which becomes a battle of the sexes.
125	25	"Head Like a Wheel"	Craig T. Nelson	Oliver Goldstick & Phil Rosenthal	May 17, 1994	24.1
Hayden just turned 49, and is not accepting his status in middle adulthood well. Christine sends him to a race car driving school as a birthday gift.
126	26	"Retrospective"	Alan Rafkin	Barry Kemp & Brad Johnson	May 24, 1994	18.7
127	27	"Retrospective"	Alan Rafkin	Barry Kemp & Brad Johnson	May 24, 1994	18.7
Mary Hart interviews the cast of Coach as their characters in this one-hour retrospective featuring clips from the show's first six seasons. Note: This episode is included as a bonus feature on season 5 of Mill Creek Entertainment's Coach: The Complete Series box set, listed as the "100th Episode Anniversary Special", despite the fact that the episode originally aired as a part of season 6, well past the series 100th episode ("One for the Road") which aired in season 5.

=== Season 7 (1994–95) ===
No. overall	No. in season	Title	Directed by	Written by	Original release date	Prod. code	U.S. viewers (millions)
128	1	"Pros & Cons"	Alan Rafkin	Alan Kirschenbaum	September 12, 1994	69801	14.7
Hayden's excited about an interview for a job coaching a pro team, but he does not know which team it is.
129	2	"It Should Happen to You"	Alan Rafkin	Oliver Goldstick & Phil Rosenthal	September 19, 1994	69802	14.1
Hayden considers hiring Susan Miller (Jessica Walter), an agent who wants to redo his image.
130	3	"Graceless Under Fire"	Craig T. Nelson	Jeremy Stevens	September 26, 1994	69803	14.6
With the football season coming, Hayden is determined to prove that his championship victory with the Screaming Eagles was not a fluke.
131	4	"Judy's Turn"	Alan Rafkin	Scott Buck	October 3, 1994	69805	14.7
Judy returns from Europe and tells Dauber she wants to call off their engagement, after having an affair.
132	5	"Above and Beyond the Call of Hayden"	Alan Rafkin	Sarit Catz & Gloria Ketterer	October 10, 1994	69804	14.4
Hayden feels neglected when Luther's relationship with Ruthanne heats up.
133	6	"Inconceivable"	Alan Rafkin	Oliver Goldstick & Phil Rosenthal	October 17, 1994	69807	15.9
Hayden and Christine feel pressured by their jobs as they try to start a family, while Luther feels guilty over selling his run down car to Mrs. Cumin (Meg Wyllie), an old woman, even though it was a lemon.
134	7	"Jailbirds"	Craig T. Nelson	Eric Horsted	October 24, 1994	69806	15.0
Christine and Ruthanne go to a bachelorette party on their girls' night out and are thrown in jail.
135	8	"My Fair Agent"	Alan Rafkin	Oliver Goldstick & Phil Rosenthal	November 7, 1994	69816	14.1
Hayden's agent Susan Miller is unable to be in Minnesota for a key game, so she sends a junior agent in her stead. Hayden is annoyed at dealing with someone who is inexperienced, but his ire turns to bafflement when the understudy is an attractive young woman.
136	9	"Be a Good Sport"	Jeff Meyer	Story by : Norman Chad; Teleplay by : Alan Kirschenbaum	November 14, 1994	69812	15.3
When the team receives extra funds from the university, Hayden finds himself at odds with Edgar (Tom McGowan), the fencing coach whose team was not very lucky.
137	10	"Working Girl"	Alan Rafkin	Sarit Catz & Gloria Ketterer	November 21, 1994	69808	14.6
Christine suspects that Carter Brooks' young protege is replacing her. Luther has a bad case of athlete's foot after wearing discarded bowling shoes from the local bowling alley.
138	11	"Out of Control"	Gordon Hunt	Brad Johnson	November 28, 1994	69810	14.5
Hayden learns that his team will have to win the next game if he wants major product endorsements. Meanwhile, an injury and an academic ineligibility means the only player qualified for a guard position is an inexperienced freshman, and the Screaming Eagles are depending on him to block the other team's star player. The main plot and subplot come together when during a close halftime, Hayden shouts at the rookie to be ruthless.
139	12	"The Popcorn Bowl"	Jeff Meyer	Oliver Goldstick & Phil Rosenthal	December 12, 1994	69818	13.5
Hayden is given a job offer from the pros on the eve of the Popcorn Bowl.
140	13	"Luther and Ruthanne Take the Big 12 Steps"	Alan Rafkin	Howard March	December 19, 1994	69814	13.8
Ruthanne vows to quit smoking, but only if Luther lays off the junk food.
141	14	"Did Someone Call Me Snorer?"	Alan Rafkin	Jeremy Stevens	January 9, 1995	69817	16.1
Christine insists that Hayden seeks help about his snoring problem.
142	15	"Close Encounters of the Worst Kind"	Tony Dow	Robin Riordan	January 16, 1995	69811	15.2
Hayden and Christine join a couple therapy group to rekindle the spark in their marriage.
143	16	"The Kicker"	Alan Rafkin	Story by : Scott Buck & Norman Chad; Teleplay by : Scott Buck	January 23, 1995	69809	14.8
Hayden travels to a country under martial law on an international recruiting trip.
144	17	"The Walk-On"	Tony Dow	Scott Buck & Eric Horsted	February 6, 1995	69822	14.5
Jim Collins (Gerald McRaney), a 46-year-old man who is attending Minnesota State on the G.I. Bill tries out for the team, causing Hayden to question his own middle adulthood.
145	18	"Call Me Cupid"	Jeff Meyer	Story by : Jeremy Stevens; Teleplay by : Oliver Goldstick & Phil Rosenthal	February 13, 1995	69823	13.1
Hayden tries to find a date for Dauber on Valentine's Day.
146	19	"Johnsonwreckers"	Jeff Meyer	Oliver Goldstick & Phil Rosenthal	February 20, 1995	69821	13.3
Hayden attempts to be friends with the former Dallas Cowboys coach Jimmy Johnson, to try for a coaching job in the NFL.
147	20	"The Day I Met Frank Gifford"	Jeff Meyer	Tom Alan Robbins	February 27, 1995	69813	15.7
Hayden and Christine are invited to a dinner in New York honoring Luther's hero Frank Gifford, meeting him along with his wife Kathie Lee Gifford.
148	21	"Kelly's New Guy: Part 1"	Andrei Belgrader	Eric Horsted	March 13, 1995	69819	13.6
Kelly is thankful when Hayden exposes her new boyfriend Peter (Robert Foxworth) as a sleaze. A twist of fate gives Kelly a new boyfriend that may leave Hayden with questions: Dauber.
149	22	"Kelly's New Guy: Part 2"	Craig T. Nelson	Story by : Jessie Mason; Teleplay by : Alan Kirschenbaum	March 20, 1995	69820	16.5
Kelly and Dauber try to keep their relationship a secret from Hayden.
150	23	"Ten Percent of Nothing"	James Gardner	Oliver Goldstick & Phil Rosenthal	April 5, 1995	69824	22.9
Luther makes a mall celebrity appearance and refuses to pay a commission, putting his friendship with Art Hibke, his agent at risk.
151	24	"Oh, a Pro Job: Part 1"	Jeff Meyer	Scott Buck	May 3, 1995	69825	21.6
Hayden and Christine make friends with Doris Sherman (Katherine Helmond), a wealthy eccentric on a cruise, who makes a surprising offer.
152	25	"Oh, a Pro Job: Part 2"	Tony Dow	Alan Kirschenbaum & Jeremy Stevens	May 10, 1995	69826	18.1
Hayden is tempted by an offer to coach a pro football team, but worries about working with Doris Sherman.

=== Season 8 (1995–96) ===
No. overall	No. in season	Title	Directed by	Written by	Original release date	Prod. code	U.S. viewers (millions)
153	1	"Is It Hot in Here, or Is It Me?: Part 1"	Barry Kemp	Alan Kirschenbaum & Phil Rosenthal	September 12, 1995	K0301	23.4
Hayden leaves Minnesota to coach a team in Florida, the Orlando Breakers, only to learn that Doris has her own game plan, which includes heavy PR by having the team participate in a parade at Universal Studios.
154	2	"Is It Hot in Here, or Is It Me?: Part 2"	Jeff Meyer	Alan Kirschenbaum & Phil Rosenthal	September 19, 1995	K0302	29.1
Hayden tries to win over Doris and the press as he prepares the Breakers for their first game.
155	3	"Fool for Lunch"	Craig T. Nelson	Eric Horsted	September 26, 1995	K0303	27.5
Luther moves into a retirement home community, and has three women: Alice (Jennifer Bassey), Mildred (Georgann Johnson) and Lois (Lois Nettleton) competing for his attention by cooking for him.
156	4	"She's Having Our Baby: Part 1"	Gordon Hunt	Ellen Sandler & Cindy Chupack	October 17, 1995	K0304	23.0
Hayden and Christine consider adopting a baby, but their ages may ruin their chances. They are then visited by a lawyer who "has his ways" of guaranteeing an adoption approval, causing the couple to think of what is right versus what is desired.
157	5	"She's Having Our Baby: Part 2"	Gordon Hunt	Joseph Staretski	October 24, 1995	K0305	23.6
Julie (A. J. Langer), a young pregnant woman thinks about giving her baby to Hayden and Christine.
158	6	"Bo Knows"	Alan Rafkin	Scott Buck	October 31, 1995	K0306	22.8
Bo Whitley, Hayden's star quarterback from Minnesota State has been drafted by the NFL, and is considering signing with the Breakers.
159	7	"Coach's Cornered"	Jeff Meyer	Joseph Staretski	November 7, 1995	K0315	23.0
When Doris fires Rockne Dawson (Nick Bakay), the hostile host of her TV station's post-game show, she offers the job to Christine, taking Hayden by surprise.
160	8	"Turtle World"	Craig T. Nelson	Brad Johnson	November 14, 1995	K0313	22.2
Luther buys a roadside attraction, then regrets it when he discovers that the animals on display are dying.
161	9	"There's Got to Be a Mourning After: Part 1"	Jeff Meyer	Scott Buck	November 21, 1995	K0310	20.2
Doris offers Luther advice when his dog Quincy passes away, then they realize their love of dogs is a shared commonality.
162	10	"There's Got to Be a Mourning After: Part 2"	Jeff Meyer	Ellen Sandler & Cindy Chupack	November 28, 1995	K0311	22.1
Hayden and Luther settle their differences over Doris, while the coaching staff perks up in spite of the team's losing season.
163	11	"Bye Bye Burleigh: Part 1"	Bill Fagerbakke	Mike Rowe	December 5, 1995	K0307	20.9
The Burleighs pay a surprise visit.
164	12	"Bye Bye Burleigh: Part 2"	Craig T. Nelson	Erika Kaestle	December 12, 1995	K0308	14.3
Hayden struggles to help Howard find a job, while the coaches see a golden opportunity for their first win of the season.
165	13	"The Tight End"	Jay Kleckner	Brad Johnson	December 19, 1995	K0317	22.0
Doris looks for endorsement opportunities for the Breakers. She instructs Hayden to sign a handsome player whom he had cut earlier and offers him a contract to model skimpy swimwear.
166	14	"Nice Guys Get Cut"	Jeff Meyer	Phil Rosenthal	January 2, 1996	K0314	21.3
Hayden has looked over his roster and made his decision whom to cut. However, Christine just invited one of the cut players and his wife to dinner.
167	15	"Her Boyfriend's Back"	Jeff Meyer	Joseph Staretski	January 30, 1996	K0318	16.3
Kevin, the father of Julie's baby comes to Hayden for advice.
168	16	"The Gardener"	Jeff Meyer	Scott Buck & Mike Rowe	February 6, 1996	K0320	18.4
Hayden fires his gardener, Kenny Montague (Tim Conway), but Luther thinks the worker deserves a second chance.
169	17	"Patching Things Up"	Jay Kleckner	Ellen Sandler & Cindy Chupack	February 13, 1996	K0321	14.6
Christine must cheer Hayden up when a doctor connects his diminished sex drive to "male menopause".
170	18	"Save the Wave"	Alan Rafkin	Brad Johnson	February 20, 1996	K0322	18.8
Doris has decided to move the Breakers to Los Angeles. Howard tries to rally Breaker fans to protest this move.
171	19	"Dauber's Vehicle"	Jeff Meyer	Eric Horsted	February 27, 1996	K0316	19.1
Dauber buys a car from Jean Brandow (Andrea Parker), an attractive, convincing saleswoman. However, he is unable to keep up with the expense.
172	20	"Quarantine"	Tony Dow	Neal Howard & Ira Fritz	March 12, 1996	K0319	17.3
Luther's pet monkey bites Hayden, leading the entire coaching staff to be quarantined for some kind of virus.
173	21	"Van Damn vs. Fox"	Craig T. Nelson	Brad Johnson	March 19, 1996	K0326	16.1
Luther sues Hayden after burning himself at Hayden's barbeque.
174	22	"Fantasy Camp"	Alan Rafkin	Scott Buck & Joseph Staretski	April 2, 1996	K0327	18.8
Hayden regrets agreeing to help coach at a fantasy football camp, but Luther and Dauber are eager to face off against him.
175	23	"Luther Get Your Gun"	Alan Rafkin	Ellen Sandler & Cindy Chupack	April 30, 1996	K0328	13.0
Luther claims to be an expert hunter in order to impress Doris' rich friends.
176	24	"A Player to be Named Later"	Phil Rosenthal	Nelson Costello	May 7, 1996	K0325	15.5
Due to the Breakers' bottom-of-the-barrel first year, they have a high pick in the NFL Draft – and numerous reporters are looking for the scoop as to who they will choose. With all this attention, Hayden worries he will "flub" the first-round draft pick.
177	25	"Somebody's Baby"	Jeff Meyer	Eric Horsted & Joseph Staretski	May 21, 1996	K0323	19.8
Hayden and Christine go to Julie's Lamaze classes, she goes into labor later that night. When Julie's father Doug and her boyfriend Kevin show up wishing to make amends for their earlier bickering, Christine and Hayden worry that Julie may have second thoughts about giving up her new baby boy.

=== Season 9 (1996–97) ===
No. overall	No. in season	Title	Directed by	Written by	Original release date	U.S. viewers (millions)
178	1	"Sleepless in Orlando"	Jeff Meyer	Brad Johnson	September 28, 1996	10.0
Hayden has to take on all parenting duties when Christine and their baby Timothy fall ill, but he also has to prepare for a game.
179	2	"Just Short of the Goal"	Craig T. Nelson	Mark Ganzel	October 5, 1996	8.5
Hayden turns down the chance to write a memoir of his failures with the Breakers, so Luther does it without his involvement.
180	3	"Last Tango in Orlando"	Ted Wass	Frank Dungan & Michael Baser	October 12, 1996	7.4
Luther grows jealous of a kicker whom Doris believes is someone the Breakers need.
181	4	"Isn't It Romantic?"	Jay Kleckner	Ellen Sandler & Cindy Chupack	October 19, 1996	8.8
Hayden's plans for a romantic evening with Christine seeing a performance by Michael Feinstein. However, the plans fall through when she refuses to leave the baby in the care of anyone else.
182	5	"We Can Never Die"	Gary Shimokawa	Joseph Staretski	October 26, 1996	7.2
The Foxes reconsider appointing the Burleighs as Tim's legal guardians.
183	6	"Grimmworld"	Jeff Meyer	Paul Redford	October 26, 1996	7.1
Dauber dates Mary Beth (Michelle Nicastro), a perky actress who works in a place called Grimmworld, which tells the Grimm Brothers stories accurately. When Hayden considers it odd, Dauber thinks he should consider breaking up with her. Hayden and Dauber actually go on set to smooth things over.
184	7	"In the Money"	Jay Kleckner	Tom J. Astle	December 11, 1996	11.8
Luther becomes engaged to Doris, but a prenuptial agreement guaranteeing him a fortune has the better of him.
185	8	"You Win Some, You Lose Some"	Jeff Meyer	Ellen Sandler & Cindy Chupack	December 18, 1996	14.1
The Foxes' holiday plans are compromised by a long-shot chance of the Breakers making the NFL playoffs.
186	9	"Wings Over Buffalo"	James Gardner	Brad Johnson	December 25, 1996	13.5
Luther's love of chicken wings gives the Breakers food poisoning right before a big game.
187	10	"Somewhere Out There"	Craig T. Nelson	Craig T. Nelson & Barry Kemp	January 8, 1997	14.13
Hayden orders Dauber to forget his obsession with alien abductions or be fired.
188	11	"A Boy and His Doll"	Bill Fraley	Ellen Sandler & Cindy Chupack	January 22, 1997	13.37
The Burleighs give Tim a limited edition Princess Tiffany doll. Tim enjoys playing with the doll and it does not bother Hayden initially until Luther and male strangers are bothered by it, changing his mind.
189	12	"The Body Gardener"	Tony Dow	Mark Ganzel & Joseph Staretski	February 5, 1997	13.28
Hayden writes his recently-fired former gardener Kenny Montague, a glowing job recommendation, despite him being extremely incompetent in every job he does.
190	13	"To Ski or Not to Ski"	Craig T. Nelson	Cindy Chupack & Ellen Sandler	February 12, 1997	14.33
At a ski resort, Dauber tries to hide from Judy after seeing her in a store and Hayden tries to help Christine face her fear of skiing.
191	14	"It's a Swamp Thing"	Jeff Meyer	Tom J. Astle	February 19, 1997	13.28
When Hayden, Luther, Dauber and Howard decide to celebrate "Man Week" in a cabin in the Everglades, Doris, Christine and Shirley plan their own vacation.
192	15	"Viva Las Ratings"	Jay Kleckner	Brad Johnson & Mark Ganzel	February 26, 1997	15.21
Luther heads to Las Vegas with Dauber and Howard where he plans to "invest" his life savings in an Elvis memorabilia auction, only to find himself up against Mimi Bobeck (Kathy Kinney), an equally determined bidder. Note: This episode is part of an ABC Las Vegas-themed crossover with Grace Under Fire, The Drew Carey Show and Ellen.
193	16	"A Fox by Any Other Name"	Tony Dow	Tom J. Astle	March 12, 1997	13.08
Hayden remembers how Tim got his name when a baby-naming contest sponsored by an antagonistic sportswriter took place following a mishap at the hospital.
194	17	"The Stench of Death"	Jeff Meyer	Joseph Staretski	March 26, 1997	12.61
Doris makes an appointment for the coaches with her psychic, who predicts that Luther will hit by a "flying fish".
195	18	"Baby Coaches"	Jeff Meyer	Joseph Staretski	April 2, 1997	12.74
A mother boasts to Hayden that her baby girl, who is only days older than Tim, can already walk and talk.
196	19	"Upsized"	Gordon Hunt	Ellen Sandler & Cindy Chupack	April 16, 1997	9.27
In need of change, Luther is promoted to be the new Breakers' general manager. Former linebacker Dick Butkus is then hired as Hayden's new defensive coordinator – and starts taking over the team.
197	20	"The Neighbor Hood"	Jeff Meyer	Mark Ganzel	April 23, 1997	10.28
The Foxes are recruited for a sting operation after receiving a package from their shady neighbors Albert (Tony Plana) and Kathi (Randee Heller).
198	21	"Leaving Orlando: Part I"	Jay Kleckner	Joseph Staretski & Tom J. Astle	May 7, 1997	10.81
Doris offers Hayden a contract extension worth $17 million. When Howard reveals other pro teams are interested in having Hayden as coach, he determines he needs to avoid Doris until he makes a decision on accepting the offer.
199	22	"Leaving Orlando: Parts II & III"	Barry Kemp	Barry Kemp & Brad Johnson & Mark Ganzel	May 14, 1997	13.13
200	23	"Leaving Orlando: Parts II & III"	Barry Kemp	Barry Kemp & Brad Johnson & Mark Ganzel	May 14, 1997	13.13
In the series finale, the Foxes retreat to their cabin so Hayden will have more time to consider Doris' contract offer and discover three men have been living under the house. Hayden, Luther and Dauber think back to their college years after visiting Minnesota State, and the Foxes make a decision for their future.
