= Jimmy Kaufman =

American film director, photographer, and artist

- Born: James Kaufman; April 1, 1949 (age 76); Montreal, Quebec, Canada
- Occupations: Film director, producer, actor, photographer, artist
- Years active: 1974–present

James Kaufman (born April 1, 1949), known as Jimmy Kaufman or Jim Kaufman, is a film director, a photographer and an artist from Montreal, best known for directing the movies Time at the Top and Whiskers, and episodes of TV series like Stargate SG-1, The Hunger and The Outer Limits (1995 TV series). Kaufman's photography series evolves around North-American journeys, with an accent on his personal relations with nature.

== Career ==
=== Early experience ===
From 1971 to 1988, Kaufman was a line producer and an assistant director for movies like The Surrogate in 1984, Children of a lesser God in 1986, and Gothika starring Halle Berry, later in 2003. His first big success was in 1990, when he had the idea for A Star for Two, a romance movie. He was still the assistant of Elliott Gould, and on his way from New Hampshire to Boston, repatriating a Porsche for the shooting of a movie, he halted in front of a nursing home in order to help an old woman cross the street. As he tried to know more about this woman, the concept of A Star for Two started to sprout in his mind. On the other side of the Manche, Christian Bel, an ex-stuntman converted to screen writing was taking a particular interest to the movies accorded to the golden age. When he decided to answer to the tender made from Kaufman, the movie finally took off. The concept for A Star For Two was simple: a couple meets again after a forty-year separation. She (Lauren Bacall) manages a nursing home in France, and he (Anthony Quinn) is a gerontologist in the United States. The movie was shot in France, in Montreal and in New-York, and was a success before it was even shot.

=== Associations ===
During his career, Kaufman worked with several renowned movie producers, directors, actors and writers. In the 1990s, for instance, he collaborated with award-winning writer Duff Brenna to adapt his novel The Book of Mamie into a movie. The Book of Mamie won the AWP Best Novel award in 1988 (judged by Toby Olson). Kaufman called Brenna's screenplay one of the finest he had ever read.

=== Photography and Painting ===
Kaufman's art photography series tell the story of his philanthropic journeys around the world and road cruises around North America. H .

== Filmography ==
=== Cinema ===
Film	Year	Starring	Genre	Position	Awards
Dracula 2000	2000	Gerard Butler, Christopher Plummer, Jonny Lee Miller	Thriller, Adventure	Second Unit Director	
Gothika	2003	Halle Berry	Thriller	First Assistant Director	Choice Movie Actress - Drama/Action Adventure - Halle Berry

=== Television movies ===
Film	Year	Starring	Genre	Position	Awards
Nightwaves	2003	Sherilyn Fenn, David Nermann	Romance	Director	
Nightmare Man	1999	Lee Horsley, Charles Edwin Powell	Thriller	Director	
Time at the Top	1999	Timothy Busfield, Elisha Cuthbert	Comedy	Director	Certificate of Merit–Finalist–Houston World Film Festival; In Competition–Cairo / St. Petersburg / Falstaff; The Film Advisory Board Award of Excellence
A Star for Two	1991	Lauren Bacall, Anthony Quinn	Romance	Director	
The Thriller	1990	Yves Beneyton, Wayne Best, Peter Dvorsky	Thriller	Director	
Moonlight Flight	1988		Thriller	Director	
Shades of Love	1987	Catherine Colvey, Joseph Bottoms, Russell T. Gordon	Romance	Director	

=== Television series ===
TV Series	Episodes	Year	Starring	Genre	Position	Awards
Charlie Jade	The Power of Suggestion	2005	Jeffrey Pierce, Michael Filipowich	Mystery	Director	
	You Are Here	2005	Jeffrey Pierce, Michael Filipowich			
Air Emergency	Helicopter Down	2003	Stephen Bogaert, Rene Anobis	Documentary	Director	
Vampire High	Lost Weekend	2002	Jeff Roop, Meghan Ory	Fantasy	Director	
	The Huntress	2002	Jeff Roop, Meghan Ory			
	The Test	2002	Jeff Roop, Meghan Ory			
	Odd Man Out	2002	Jeff Roop, Meghan Ory			
	The Summoning	2001	Jeff Roop, Meghan Ory			
	What's Up Doc?	2001	Jeff Roop, Meghan Ory			
The Outer Limits	Mindreacher	2001	Alex Diakun, Eric Schneider	Thriller	Director	
	The Vessel	2001	Alex Diakun, Eric Schneider			
	Final Appeal	2000	Alex Diakun, Eric Schneider			
	The Haven	1999	Alex Diakun, Eric Schneider			
	Donor	1999	Alex Diakun, Eric Schneider			
	Rite of Passage	1998	Alex Diakun, Eric Schneider			
Caitlin's Way	Icicle	2001	Lindsay Felton, Cynthia Belliveau	Drama	Director	
	Truth or Dare	2000	Lindsay Felton, Cynthia Belliveau	Drama		
Big Wolf on Campus	Faltered States	2000	Danny Smith, Brandon Quinn	Comedy, Horror	Director	
	Fear and Loathing in Pleasantville	2000	Danny Smith, Brandon Quinn			
	Mind Over Merton	2000	Danny Smith, Brandon Quinn			
	101 Damnations	2000	Danny Smith, Brandon Quinn			
	Commie Dawkins	2000	Danny Smith, Brandon Quinn			
	Hello Nasty	2000	Danny Smith, Brandon Quinn			
	Time and Again	1999	Danny Smith, Brandon Quinn			
	Invisible Merton	1999	Danny Smith, Brandon Quinn			
Emily of New Moon	A Bill of Divorcement	2000	Martha MacIsaac, Sheila McCarthy	Drama	Director	
	Bred in the Bone	1999	Martha MacIsaac, Sheila McCarthy			
	The Return of Maida Flynn	1999	Martha MacIsaac, Sheila McCarthy			
	When the Bough Breaks	1998	Martha MacIsaac, Sheila McCarthy			
	A Child Shall Lead Them	1998	Martha MacIsaac, Sheila McCarthy			
The New Addams Family	Lights, Camera, Addams!!	1999	Glenn Taranto, Ellie Harvie	Comedy, Horror	Director	
Earth: Final Conflict	Heroes & Heartbreak	1999	Von Flores, Leni Parker	Mystery	Director	
Poltergeist: The Legacy	Vendetta	1999	Derek de Lint, Martin Cummins	Horror, Sci-Fi	Director	
	Dream Lover	1998	Derek de Lint, Martin Cummins	Horror, Sci-Fi		
The Hunger	Footsteps	1998	Terence Stamp, David Bowie	Horror	Director	
Stargate SG-1	Tin Man	1998	Richard Dean Anderson, Michael Shanks	Sci-Fi	Director	Gemini Nomination
The Adventures of Sinbad	-	1996	Zen Gesner, George Buza	Adventure	Director	
Due South	I Coulda Been a Defendant	1997	Paul Gross, Callum Keith Rennie	Drama, Comedy	Director	
Sirens	Color Blind	1995	A.J. Johnson, Liza Snyder	Drama	Director	
	The Passenger	1995	A.J. Johnson, Liza Snyder			
	Aftermath	1995	A.J. Johnson, Liza Snyder			
	Gambling on Love	1995	A.J. Johnson, Liza Snyder			
	Victims	1994	A.J. Johnson, Liza Snyder			
	The First Time	1994	A.J. Johnson, Liza Snyder			
	A Cop First	1994	A.J. Johnson, Liza Snyder			
	Chasing a Ghost	1994	A.J. Johnson, Liza Snyder			
Urban Angel	Family Business	1992	Louis Ferreira, Vittorio Rossi	Crime	Director	
	Phoenix Rising: Part 1	1992	Louis Ferreira, Vittorio Rossi			
	Deadly Force	1992	Louis Ferreira, Vittorio Rossi			
	Phoenix Rising: Part 2	1992	Louis Ferreira, Vittorio Rossi			
Haute tension	La mort en dédicace	1989	Alexandra Stewart, Yves Beneyton	Thriller	Director	
Danger Bay	Chanda	1989	Donnelly Rhodes, Susan Walden	Adventure, Family	Director	
My Secret Identity	-	1988	Jerry O'Connell, Marsha Moreau	Sci-Fi	Director	

=== Video ===
Video	Starring	Year	Genre	Position	Awards
Night of the Demons III	Larry Day, Amelia Kinkade	1997	Thriller	Director	
Red Rain		1993	Thriller	Director	
Shades of Love: Sincerely, Violet	Simon MacCorkindale, Patricia Phillips	1987	Romance	Director	
Shades of Love: Lilac Dream	Dack Rambo, Susan Almgren	1987	Romance	Director	

=== Producer ===
Film	Year	Genre	Position	Award
Race for the Bomb	1987	War	Associate producer	
The Peanut Butter Solution	1985	Comedy	Line producer	
Night Magic	1985	Fantasy	Producer	
Tell Me That You Love Me	1983	Comedy	Producer	

=== Projects ===
==== Gallows Humor ====
Currently, Jimmy Kaufman is working on a movie called Gallows Humor, a horror trilogy written by Brendan King and meant to be produced as a franchise. The idea of Gallows Humor was born after the development deal Brendan King forged with veteran producer Paul Kurta.
