= List of My Secret Identity episodes =

My Secret Identity is a television series starring Jerry O'Connell and Derek McGrath that originally aired on CTV. It premiered on October 9, 1988, and ended on May 25, 1991, with a total of 72 episodes over the course of 3 seasons.

== Series overview ==
Season	Episodes	Originally released	
Season	Episodes	First released	Last released
1	24	October 9, 1988	June 3, 1989
2	24	October 7, 1989	June 2, 1990
3	24	September 29, 1990	May 25, 1991

== Episodes ==
=== Season 1 (1988–89) ===
No. overall	No. in season	Title	Directed by	Written by	Original release date
1	1	"Pilot"	Don McBrearty	Brian Levant & Fred Fox, Jr.	October 9, 1988
Andrew accidentally stumbles onto Dr. J's photon beam, which inadvertently gifts him with super powers. Andrew also develops a crush on a wary girl (Alyson Court) who just moved in across the street.
2	2	"A Walk on the Wild Side"	Bill Corcoran	David Cole	October 16, 1988
The key component for Dr. J's latest invention is stolen by a group of wayward children. Andrew goes undercover and fakes loyalty to the gang in an attempt to recover the device, only to run into trouble when he meets the mastermind and leader of the gang, Rock (David Hewlett) who doesn't take too kindly to Andrew.
3	3	"Only Trying to Help"	Al Waxman	Eric Weinthal	October 23, 1988
Stephanie reads about "Ultraman's" adventures in Andrew's diary, and enlists a psychiatrist to try to help Andrew.
4	4	"The Track Star"	Robert Iscove	Eric Weinthal	October 30, 1988
Andrew uses his super speed to land himself a spot on the school track team, much to Dr. J's dismay.
5	5	"Memories"	Al Waxman	Eric Weinthal	November 6, 1988
Dr. J's old but beautiful friend Susan comes to town, and agrees to go on a date with him. Andrew secretly tags along to help Dr. J get through the date.
6	6	"You've Got a Friend"	Don McCutcheon	Michael P. Williams	November 13, 1988
Andrew meets Fred Cooper, the former actor of comic book legend Captain Noble. However, since Fred is retired and incapable of performing stunts, Andrew begins to lose his faith in the old man.
7	7	"For Old Time's Sake"	Al Waxman	Martin Mobley	November 20, 1988
A spy, posing as a friend of Dr. J's attempts to steal information on his latest invention via espionage.
8	8	"The Lost Weekend"	Donald Shebib	Bill Murtagh	November 27, 1988
Dr. J reluctantly agrees to take Andrew and his friends on a camping trip. However, Andrew's friends don't enjoy having a nerd like Jeffcoate serving as their chaperone.
9	9	"Forbidden Ground"	Bill Corcoran	Joe Chilco	December 4, 1988
Andrew neglects his responsibility to look after Erin, which leads to her getting trapped in a sewer drain while playing hide-and-seek.
10	10	"It Only Hurts for a Little While"	Harvey Frost	Eric Weinthal	December 11, 1988
Just after Andrew picks a fight with the school bully, he loses his super powers after being exposed to his dentist's x-ray machine. Andrew must then face up to the bully without his powers.
11	11	"Grounded"	Al Waxman	Laura Phillips	December 18, 1988
Andrew nets himself a date, but is prohibited from leaving the house when Stephanie grounds him for fighting with Erin.
12	12	"The Eyes of the Shadow"	Alan Simmonds	Fred Fox, Jr., Elliot Stern	January 28, 1989
While visiting Chinatown with Dr. J, Andrew develops a crush on a girl named Leah. However, the store owned by Leah's father is in danger from a local gang.
13	13	"The Video Connection"	Jimmy Kaufman	S : Stephen Witkin; S/T : David Cole	February 5, 1989
Andrew gets a job delivering tapes at the local video store, but soon discovers that one of the workers is using the service to sell drugs.
14	14	"Toxic Time Bomb"	Alan Simmonds	Richard Marcus	February 12, 1989
Dr. J gets a job at MacroPlex Industries as a consultant, only to learn that the company is illegally disposing of its chemicals.
15	15	"Two Faces Have I"	Harvey Frost	Eliot Stern	February 19, 1989
Dr. J uses his latest invention to give himself a split personality not unlike Dr. Jekyll and Mr. Hyde, which he hopes will make him more successful with women. However, his intentions backfire when he finds himself courting Mrs. Schellenbach.
16	16	"One on One"	Alan Simmonds	Phil Bedard, Larry Lalonde	February 26, 1989
Andrew is shooting hoops in the Briarwood gym when who should enter but Bobby Spillman, Briarwood's greatest basketball player, who made the NBA draft in 1983. Bobby gives Andrew some pointers and confides that he's working across the street.
17	17	"Stranger in the House"	Jimmy Kaufman	Eric Weinthal	March 5, 1989
Andrew's pen-pal John, who happens to be a prisoner, gets released from prison. After John meets Dr. J while dining at the Clements' house, Andrew suspects that John may still be a criminal.
18	18	"Secret Code"	Stefan Scaini	David Cole	March 12, 1989
Dr. J's latest invention for the Navy is targeted by spies. The spies later suspect Dr. J giving Andrew top-secret information (actually a spaghetti sauce recipe) and kidnap Andrew, along with school reporter Cassie Martin.
19	19	"Look Before You Leap"	Donald Shebib	Elliot Stern	April 22, 1989
Mrs. Schellenbach catches Andrew using his powers on film. Andrew and Dr. J must then find a way to retrieve the tape and convince Mrs. Schellenbach that she imagined the incident.
20	20	"Breaking the Ice"	Jimmy Kaufman	Eric Weinthal	May 6, 1989
Andrew ditches his friend Jeff when he suspects that he's dating his former girlfriend.
21	21	"Give the Guy a Chance"	Jimmy Kaufman	Judith Broadway	May 13, 1989
Andrew helps a dorky kid named Doug land a part in the school play.
22	22	"When the Sun Goes Down"	Donald Shebib	Bill Fuller, Jim Pond	May 20, 1989
When Stephanie and her friend Denise go out for dinner, Andrew is saddled with babysitting Denise's son.
23	23	"Lookin' for Trouble"	Timothy Bond	Neil Ross	May 27, 1989
Andrew suspects that there's too much crime going on that he forgets about Stephanie's birthday.
24	24	"The Set Up"	Don McCutcheon	Gary Skiles	June 3, 1989
Dr. J foolishly loses his newest formula to a client without getting paid. He then enlists the help of Andrew and the owner of a comic book store to help him get his money.

=== Season 2 (1989–90) ===
No. overall	No. in season	Title	Directed by	Written by	Original release date
25	1	"Out of Control"	Alan Simmonds	Roy Sallows	October 7, 1989
Andrew and Dr. J compete in the father-son bicycle race. Meanwhile, Erin tries to set up Stephanie with her piano teacher.
26	2	"Not So Fast"	Harvey Frost	Fred Fox, Jr.	October 14, 1989
Andrew meets up with his childhood friend Kirk, who has just moved back to Briarwood. However, Kirk's already landed himself in trouble with a gang.
27	3	"Nowhere to Hide"	Alan Simmonds	S : Barry Silverman; S/T : Eric Weinthal	October 21, 1989
Andrew runs into a cautious girl named Piper, whom he later learns is on the run for killing someone.
28	4	"Photon Blues"	Otta Hanus	Eric Weinthal	October 28, 1989
Mrs. Schellenbach's nephew Jamie steals Dr. J's photon beam for use in a nightclub. Andrew, Dr. J and Kirk then attempt to get it back. Note: In this episode, Andrew gets hit by the photon beam a second time, thus gaining his super strength.
29	5	"Heading for Trouble"	Harvey Frost	Angelo Stea, Peter Lauterman	November 4, 1989
Andrew uses his super strength to help start the Jeep belonging to Shaun, a football star at school. He then gains the respect of Shaun and his friends, who routinely drink beer for pleasure. Andrew ends up drinking beer as well, and learns the consequences of intoxication.
30	6	"Long Shot"	George Bloomfield	Bill Murtagh	November 11, 1989
Andrew is given a job as a photographer for the school paper. However, when he uses his powers to get otherwise impossible photos, fellow photographer Beth begins to feel upstaged.
31	7	"Along for the Ride"	Stefan Scaini	Elliott Stern	November 18, 1989
Andrew hangs out with Jim, his friend Nicole's older brother. However, when Jim robs a convenience store, Andrew gets arrested when the police find him sitting in the driver's seat of Jim's car.
32	8	"Collision Course"	George Bloomfield	Rick Adamson	November 25, 1989
When the lockers of students of Briarwood High are being broken into, Andrew is led to believe that Kirk is the culprit.
33	9	"Troubled Waters"	Stefan Scaini	Scott Barrie	December 2, 1989
Erin and Dr. J's old friend Professor Quiggen are kidnapped by smugglers who hold them hostage out on a lake. Andrew and Dr. J then work together to rescue them.
34	10	"Don't Look Down"	Otta Hanus	David Cole	December 9, 1989
Dr. J enrolls as Andrew's substitute science teacher. He then learns about Mitch, the class clown whom he and Andrew discover is actually fairly smart.
35	11	"Caught in the Middle"	Stuart Gillard	Greg Phillips	December 16, 1989
Andrew and Kirk ride along with a police officer to learn about the aspects of her job.
36	12	"Secrets for Sale"	Alan Simmonds	Judith Broadway	January 27, 1990
Dr. J is trying to protect an area from deforestation. Meanwhile, Stephanie lands herself a contract with the man in charge of the entire project.
37	13	"Running Home"	Don McCutcheon	Eric Weinthal	February 3, 1990
Andrew tags along with Kirk when he goes to visit his father in Riverdale, whom he considers moving in with.
38	14	"Missing"	Harvey Frost	Lou Messina	February 10, 1990
When Dr. J fails to return home from a trip on time, Andrew and Kirk suspect that he's been kidnapped.
39	15	"Stolen Melodies"	Otta Hanus	Bill Murtagh	February 17, 1990
When Andrew gets the up-and-coming band "Splitting Headache" to perform at Briarwood High, he suspects Kirk of distributing bootleg recordings of the music.
40	16	"Toe to Toe"	Otta Hanus	Michael O'Connell, Derek McGrath	February 24, 1990
Andrew's date conflicts with his commitment to volunteer at wrestling fund-raiser, so he takes his date there instead of dancing. Meanwhile, Dr. J accidentally signs himself up to fight against a huge wrestler.
41	17	"Reluctant Hero"	Eric Weinthal	Michael Mercer	March 1, 1990
Kirk loses faith in himself after witnessing Andrew save a kid's life. Not wanting to lose Kirk's friendship, Andrew attempts to reveal his powers to him.
42	18	"Split Decision"	Randy Bradshaw	S : Jennie Blackton, Joan Desberg Greenberg; T : Eric Weinthal	March 8, 1990
Andrew finds himself choosing between going on a double date with Kirk, or hanging out with a troubled child.
43	19	"Misfire"	Stuart Gillard	Elliot Stern	April 28, 1990
Andrew misuses Dr. J's newest invention, which will supposedly increase one's learning capacity. However, this leads to Andrew being unable to control his powers while away on a ski trip.
44	20	"White Lies"	Donald Shebib	S : Steve Lucas; S/T : Eric Weinthal	May 5, 1990
Kirk is convinced that Andrew is spreading rumours about him via the school newspaper. Meanwhile, Erin develops a minor crush on Kirk himself.
45	21	"Off the Record"	Otta Hanus	S : Elliott Stern; T : Bill Murtagh	May 12, 1990
Andrew and Kirk land themselves jobs as VJs at Mostly Music and gain many fans. However, impending budget cuts lead to the problem of one VJ getting fired.
46	22	"Best Friends"	Rob Malenfant	Joe Menosky	May 19, 1990
Kirk gets Andrew a job at Lick's, so that he can help pay for some concert tickets. However, Kirk neglects his work and is consequently unable to pay for his share.
47	23	"More Than Meets the Eye"	Harvey Frost	S : Ron Morgove; T : Rick Adamson	May 26, 1990
Andrew and Kirk accompany Dr. J to the all-girls school that his niece Rebecca is attending to help him set up a presentation. However, Rebecca turns out to not be the precious girl that Dr. J thinks she is.
48	24	"Seems Like Only Yesterday"	Donald Shebib	Fred Fox, Jr.	June 2, 1990
Andrew tries to save the Rocket Roller Skating rink when he learns that the place is being torn down.

=== Season 3 (1990–91) ===
No. overall	No. in season	Title	Directed by	Written by	Original release date
49	1	"Ground Control"	Otta Hanus	John May	September 29, 1990
Stephanie's boss leaves his Ferrari on the Clements' driveway while he's away on a trip. Then Kirk invites a grounded Andrew to a party, which they "secretly borrow" the Ferrari to attend...thus creating a nightmare for themselves. Note: This is the last episode in which Andrew gets grounded and loses car privileges.
50	2	"Trading Places"	Don McCutcheon	Eric Weinthal	October 6, 1990
Dr. J uses hypnosis to make Stephanie more impulsive. Consequently, Andrew and Kirk are also affected by the hypnotism, and begin to act like one another. Note: From this episode on, Andrew is allowed to drive again.
51	3	"Drop Out"	Carlo Liconti	Dawn Ritchie	October 13, 1990
Less than satisfied with the results of his career test, Kirk drops out of school and pursues a career in Motocross.
52	4	"Sour Grapes"	Harvey Frost	Terry Saltsman	October 20, 1990
Dr. J takes Andrew and Kirk with him to France to have his synthetic wine tested. However, someone is seemingly out to kill Dr. J.
53	5	"First Love"	Harvey Frost	Paul Ledoux	October 27, 1990
Andrew falls madly in love with Dusty, a girl that Dr. J has connections with. However, Andrew is appalled when he learns that Dusty is moving to Chile.
54	6	"Novel Idea"	Stuart Gillard	Aubrey Tadman	November 3, 1990
When Andrew is issued a creative writing assignment, he envisions himself, his family and friends as characters in a Dick Tracy-esque story.
55	7	"David's Dream"	William Fruet	Susan Snooks	November 10, 1990
Andrew befriends a boy named David who has an inoperable brain tumor, and is set to die in less than a year. Dr. J makes arrangements for David to fly in an F-16, but David instead chooses to watch Andrew's windsurfing race.
56	8	"Bump in Time"	Otta Hanus	Sanjay Mehta	November 17, 1990
On his way to work, Andrew runs into a tree and faints. He awakens to find himself in the year 1969, and befriends a hippie named Robbie, who is protesting against certain chemicals. After helping Robbie, Andrew "wakes up" in the present, and realizes that the hippie he met was actually his father.
57	9	"Calendar Boy"	Don McCutcheon	Dawn Ritchie	November 24, 1990
Due to unusual circumstances, Andrew lands himself a role in the school fashion show. However, when a photographer catches him changing in his underwear, the picture that circulates leads Andrew to a world of fame, fortune and an uncomfortable job.
58	10	"Moving Out"	Otta Hanus	John May	December 1, 1990
Andrew agrees to housesit for Stephanie's friend Lisa, and is given the opportunity to live in her apartment. However, when Andrew entrusts Kirk with a spare key, the place turns into a party zone.
59	11	"Teen Hot Line"	Don McCutcheon	Martin Lager	January 19, 1991
Andrew and Kirk get jobs as counselors at Dr. J's new helpline for teenagers. Andrew finds himself unable to help a troubled boy with an abusive father, while Kirk befriends a handicapped girl whose father is overprotective.
60	12	"Trial by Peers"	Otta Hanus	S : Charles Lazer; S/T : Dawn Ritchie	January 26, 1991
Working as a valet, Andrew is tried in Teen Court when the police find a set of keys in his uniform pocket.
61	13	"A Life in the Day of Dr. J"	Steve DiMarco	Dawn Ritchie	February 2, 1991
Dr. J skips out on his own surprise birthday party to test out his new vertigo machine. Through this machine, he is visited by the ghosts of birthdays past, present and future, much like Ebeneezer Scrooge in A Christmas Carol.
62	14	"My Other Secret Identity"	Otta Hanus	Aubrey Tadman	February 9, 1991
When Andrew is unable to land himself a part in a movie, just so he can kiss the main actress, he takes on the disguise of a girl and gets a role.
63	15	"Pirate Radio"	Harvey Frost	S : John May; T : Wilson Coneybeare	February 16, 1991
Andrew and Kirk start their own pirate radio station. After Andrew and Kirk get a warning from the government, Dr. J uses their radio station to send out an important message.
64	16	"From the Trenches"	Harvey Frost	John May	February 23, 1991
Andrew and Kirk recap the events of their latest double date to Dr. J, which they try to present as a novel.
65	17	"The Invisible Dr. J"	Stefan Scaini	Susan Snooks, Scott Barrie	March 2, 1991
Andrew is pulled out of detention by Dr. J, who has rendered himself invisible and needs Andrew's help in getting the antidote. After making himself invisible a second time, Dr. J's antics lead to Andrew getting expelled. To make things worse, a frightened Mrs. Schellenbach spills the antidote before Dr. J can drink it.
66	18	"Three Men and a Skull"	Otta Hanus	Derek McGrath, Michael O'Connell	March 9, 1991
When Dr. J's self-absorbed brother Hartley comes to Briarwood, the two of them find themselves working together when Hartley's latest discovery is stolen.
67	19	"The Great Indoors"	William Fruet	S : Richard Adamson; T : Dawn Ritchie	March 16, 1991
The Clements, Dr. J and Kirk go up to the family cottage so that they can tidy the place up for its new owners. However, an avalanche soon leaves everyone trapped inside the cottage, to the point where it seems that only Andrew's powers can save them.
68	20	"Dr. J's Brain Machine"	George Bloomfield	David Garber, Bruce Kalish	April 27, 1991
A glitch in Dr. J's memory retrieval machine causes Andrew to suffer from amnesia. In the scheme of a clip show, Dr. J does what he can to remind Andrew about his family, friends and super powers.
69	21	"Slave for a Day"	George Bloomfield	S : Nancy Merritt Bell, Maciej Dutkiewicz; T : Glenn Norman	May 4, 1991
Andrew volunteers for the Slave for a Day auction, when he is sold to a man who asks him to date his daughter without her knowledge. Meanwhile, Mrs. Schellenbach purchases Dr. J so that he can serve as her dance partner.
70	22	"Big Business"	Ken Girotti	John May	May 11, 1991
While working as a cleaner at an advertising firm, Andrew is unexpectedly hired as a youth consultant.
71	23	"My Old Flame"	Stefan Scaini	Wilson Coneybeare	May 18, 1991
Andrew discovers that Kirk is dating his old girlfriend and accidentally creates a stir between the two of them. Meanwhile, Erin sets Dr. J up on a date with his old colleague.
72	24	"A Bank, a Holdup, a Robber and a Hero"	William Fruet	David Garber, Bruce Kalish	May 25, 1991
Andrew, Stephanie, Dr. J and Kirk all witness a bank robbery; subsequently, each of them give their own take as to what happened (a la Rashomon).
