= Sirens (1993 TV series) =

- Genre: Crime drama
- Created by: Ann Lewis Hamilton
- Starring: Jayne Brook; Adrienne-Joi Johnson; Liza Snyder; Jayne Heitmeyer
- Composers: David Benoit; Steve Love; Marty Simon
- Countries of origin: United States; Canada
- Original language: English
- No. of seasons: 2
- No. of episodes: 35

Production
- Executive producers: David H. Balkan; Robert Butler; Ann Lewis Hamilton; Robin Spry
- Producers: Michael Cassutt; Chris Coles; Robert Engles; David Valdes
- Production locations: Montreal, Quebec, Canada
- Running time: 60 mins.
- Production company: Telescene Film Group

Original release
- Network: ABC (1993); Syndication (1994–95)
- Release: March 10, 1993 – May 21, 1995

Sirens is a Canadian-American crime drama series that aired on ABC in 1993, and then in syndication from 1994 to 1995. The show was filmed in Montreal, Quebec, Canada, standing in for Pittsburgh, Pennsylvania, where the show is set.

== Synopsis ==
Sirens focused on the work and lives of three rookie female Pittsburgh Police officers. Officer Sarah Berkezchuk (Jayne Brook) is dealing with her failing marriage, Officer Lynn Stanton (Adrienne-Joi Johnson) is a single mom, and second-generation cop Officer Molly Whelan (Liza Snyder) has a bad attitude which starts to interfere with her job. Each rookie officer worked under a veteran cop, and each grows and becomes more focused as a result. A few episodes into the syndicated series Molly Whelan is taken under the wing of Detective Lt. Lyle Springer (J. H. Wyman) and slowly learns the ropes of detective work, and becomes a stand-up policewoman.

Despite receiving an Emmy nomination, the series was canceled by ABC after 13 episodes, but was picked up in syndication the following year, with 22 episodes being produced and aired. Sirens' syndicated run featured a slightly different cast, with Adrienne-Joi Johnson and Liza Snyder reprising their lead roles, and Jayne Heitmeyer replacing Jayne Brook, but was still set in Pittsburgh.

This TV formula, while not a success with Sirens, was somewhat retooled into 2010's Rookie Blue, which like Sirens was predominantly filmed in Canada.

== Characters ==
- Officer Sarah Berkezchuk (Jayne Brook, season 1)
- Officer Lynn Stanton (Adrienne-Joi Johnson)
- Officer Molly Whelan (Liza Snyder)
- Heidi Schiller (Deirdre O'Connell, season 1)
- Dan Kelly (John Terlesky, season 1; Claude Genest, season 2)
- Robert (Anthony Salador, season 1)
- Lieutenant Lyle Springer (Robert Rothman, season 1; Joel Wyner, season 2)
- James 'Buddy' Zunder (Tim Thomerson)
- Cary Berkezchuk (John Speredakos, season 1)
- Jessie Jaworski (Jayne Heitmeyer; season 2)
- Amy Shapiro (Ellen David, season 2)
- Ritchie Stiles (Christopher Judge, season 2)

== Episodes ==
=== Series overview ===
Season	Episodes	Originally released		
Season	Episodes	First released	Last released	Network
1	13	March 10, 1993	July 7, 1993	ABC
2	22	September 30, 1994	May 21, 1995	Syndication

=== Season 1 (1993) ===
No. overall	No. in season	Title	Directed by	Written by	Original release date
1	1	"PM Turn"	Robert Butler	Ann Lewis Hamilton	March 10, 1993
On the first shift, Lynn Stanton finds a parent whose missing TV is more important to her than her missing kids; Molly Whelan gets no slack from her partner; and Sarah Berkezchuk is bloodied by a brick thrower.
2	2	"They Do It Standing Up"	Allan Arkush	Michael Cassutt	March 17, 1993
Lynn deals with the heartbreak of notifying a dead man's next-of-kin, while a basketball player falls in love with Molly when she insists on playing basketball with them.
3	3	"Jumper"	Unknown	Ann Lewis Hamilton	March 24, 1993
A man threatening to jump from a bridge will only let rookie officer Berkezchuk on the ledge with him to talk him down.
4	4	"Everybody Lies"	Unknown	Alfonso H. Moreno	March 31, 1993
Whelan has to appear in court to testify against a woman who assaulted her but things don't go planned. Meanwhile the Berkezchuks argue over money issues.
5	5	"Holy Deadlock"	Unknown	Marlane Meyer	April 7, 1993
Whelan has a date with a weatherman while Berkezchuk thinks there is something odd about her husband's attempts to reconcile.
6	6	"What We Talk About When We Talk About Love (Battered)"	Robert Butler	Ann Lewis Hamilton	April 14, 1993
A battered wife hesitates to press charges, but her lawyer husband has no qualms doing so. Whelan doesn't want her new boyfriend to find out she is a cop. Later she finds out he has a secret of his own.
7	7	"Strike Two"	Unknown	Harriet Dickey	April 21, 1993
Berkezchuk moves in with Stanton who has been accused of using excessive force and faces a hearing.
8	8	"Guy Perfect"	Unknown	Scott Shepherd	April 28, 1993
Stanton starts to resent Whelan while Schiller gives Sarah some good advice on handling Kelly who has just gotten the results of his sergeant's examination.
9	9	"Looks Like Christmas"	Unknown	Dan Horan	June 2, 1993
The Christmas spirit fills the station, but out on the streets it is business as usual. Christmas festivities include an unamused drug dealer, children who have to deal with their mother's suicide attempt, Whelan's fruitcake and a drunk driver who thinks he is George Bailey (James Stewart's character) from It's A Wonder Life.
10	10	"Gal Cops"	Unknown	Michael Cassutt	June 9, 1993
A television crew for a reality show called "Gal Cops" follows the female officers in the precinct for the day.
11	11	"Waterloo"	Unknown	Marlane Meyer	June 23, 1993
Schiller is stabbed due to Molly's inattention while the Berkezchuk household continues to have more problems.
12	12	"Keeping the Peace"	Unknown	Robert Engels	June 30, 1993
Stanton becomes deeply concerned about deadly force after she pulls her gun on a group of juveniles. Whelan tries to learn more about her partner Schiller.
13	13	"They'll Get You in the End (Friday the 13th)"	Unknown	Unknown	July 7, 1993
Stanton takes an unusual bus ride when her car stops working. Whalen tries to figure out why Schiller is so on edge on this particular day.

=== Season 2 (1994–95) ===
No. overall	No. in season	Title	Directed by	Written by	Original release date
14–15	1–2	"Gun Play"	Unknown	Paul B. Margolis	September 30, 1994
Jessie has to deal with the murder of her husband. When guns are stolen from the property room she realizes that the two crimes may be linked to it.
16	3	"Crossing the Line"	Giles Walker	Walter Brough	October 7, 1994
Stanton shoots a young suspect in self-defense and is stalked by the dead girl's friend. Meanwhile Jessie finds an abandoned baby in the car and becomes attached to him.
17	4	"Farewell to Arms"	Jean-Claude Lord	William Schmidt	October 14, 1994
Lynn and Amy attempt to keep order in a neighborhood that is torn by feuding Serbians and Croatians. Meanwhile Molly must deal with her grandfather's mental breakdown.
18	5	"Chasing a Ghost"	Jimmy Kaufman	Allison Hock	October 21, 1994
Molly and her training officer have to transport an insane murder suspect and Lynn must handle an old con-man. Meanwhile Jessie decides to go on a talk show.
19	6	"A Cop First"	Jimmy Kaufman	Jeff Benjamin	October 28, 1994
Molly is talked into becoming a phone sex operator to catch a serial killer. Meanwhile Jessie interrogates an informer who might know something about the councilman who was shot dead in a car in the park.
20	7	"The Needle and the Damage Done"	Gabriel Pelletier	Todd Trotter	November 4, 1994
Lynn is stabbed with a drug addict's used needle while attempting to arrest him. Meanwhile Jessie investigates a man who claims he fired the shot that killed John F. Kennedy.
21	8	"The First Time"	Jimmy Kaufman	Art Monterastelli	November 11, 1994
Molly's dream day off turns into a nightmare when she becomes a hostage in a coffee shop. Amy and Lynn are accused of using excess violence in arresting a traffic violator.
22	9	"Guns, Bombs and Fantasies"	Giles Walker	Alfonso H. Moreno	November 18, 1994
Jessie gives a talk at her old high school where a student is shot. This event exposes a secret club in the school. Meanwhile back at the station a mad bomber makes life more difficult for the officers.
23	10	"Family Secrets"	Gabriel Pelletier	Carol Doyle	November 25, 1994
Molly is in a quandary when she accidentally learns that a fellow officer was involved with a murder victim. Jessie and Dan investigate a possible child abuse case.
24	11	"Victims"	Jimmy Kaufman	Peter Haynes	December 2, 1994
Lynn reaches out to a teenage girl who witnessed a murder but reluctant to testify. Richie and Molly try to stop an extortionist. Stiles goes after a gangbanger.
25	12	"Missing"	Giles Walker	Paul B. Margolis	January 22, 1995
Richie is missing and Molly is frantic. Jessie is assigned to work with the FBI. When she becomes close to agent Jack, Dan gets jealous.
26	13	"The Witness"	Giles Walker	Peter Svatek	January 29, 1995
Molly and Lynn have to put their vacation on hold when they are assigned to protect a hostile socialite witness.
27	14	"Angel Falling"	Gabriel Pelletier	Art Monterastelli	February 5, 1995
Detective Springer is partnered with his former training officer during a drug investigation. Lynn and Amy are assigned to protect a rapist who has served his time and has just been released from prison.
28	15	"Gambling on Love"	Jimmy Kaufman	Alyson Adler	February 12, 1995
Molly discovers that her new boyfriend is a gambler whose debts are mounting and could possibly be connected to a recent murder.
29	16	"The Abduction"	Giles Walker	Mark Lisson	February 19, 1995
Buddy and Dan are abducted by a group of desperate robbers and taken to an abandoned warehouse unknown to their fellow officers.
30	17	"The Aftermath"	Jimmy Kaufman	Art Monterastelli	February 26, 1995
The investigation into the beating death of a family man uncovers a connection between the mob and the dead man's brother. Lynn has problems mourning Buddy's death while Amy is promoted into his old position.
31	18	"Redemption"	Marc F. Voizard	Paul B. Margolis	March 5, 1995
While stopping a fight between two gangs, Lynn discovers that her cousin's son is a gang member. The parish priest thinks he can cool off the gangs, but discovers it is not that easy.
32	19	"The Passenger"	Jimmy Kaufman	Unknown	April 30, 1995
The serial murders of several cab drivers causes Springer to call in a psychologist to make a profile and he acts as bait with Molly and Rich. Meanwhile back at the station, all the cops are freezing when the heating system fails.
33	20	"The Obsession"	Gabriel Pelletier	Mark Lisson	May 7, 1995
Jessie begins dating a doctor she saved during a robbery, but when she decides to break it off, he becomes obsessed and begins stalking her.
34	21	"Color Blind"	Jimmy Kaufman	Allison Adler	May 14, 1995
Molly investigates a car that has plunged into the river. Lynn becomes involved in a racially charged case and becomes the subject of a reporter's TV profile.
35	22	"The Sound of One Hand Clapping"	Minor Mustain	David H. Balkan	May 21, 1995
Molly goes undercover to trap a killer that is preying on homeless people at a campground. Meanwhile Lynn befriends a deaf man who might be a witness to the killings.

== Awards and nominations ==
Year	Award	Category	Recipient	Result	Ref
1992	Casting Society of America	Best Casting for TV, Pilot	Judith Holstra and Nikki Valko	Nominated	
1992	Emmy Awards	Outstanding Individual Achievement in Directing in a Drama Series	Robert Butler (for episode: "What We Talk About When We Talk About Love")	Nominated	
1996	Gemini Awards	Best Original Music Score for a Dramatic Series	Marty Simon	Nominated	
1996	Gemini Awards	Best Direction in a Dramatic or Comedy Series	Giles Walker	Nominated	
