= A Star for Two =

- Film poster
- Directed by: Jimmy Kaufman
- Written by: Christian Bel; Jimmy Kaufman
- Produced by: Jeffery Epstein
- Starring: Lauren Bacall; Anthony Quinn; Jean-Pierre Aumont
- Cinematography: Edmond Richard
- Edited by: William S. Scharf
- Music by: Georges Garvarentz
- Production companies: Cine Video, Line Productions, Stick Films
- Distributed by: Metro-Goldwyn-Mayer
- Release date: 1991
- Running time: 91 minutes
- Countries: France; Canada
- Languages: French; English

A Star for Two is a 1991 French-Canadian romantic drama film directed by Jimmy Kaufman and starring Lauren Bacall, Anthony Quinn, Jean-Pierre Aumont, and Lila Kedrova.

== Plot ==
In the 1980s, two people reunite decades after a passioned wartime affair to find their love. However, they will find new complications when they try to restart their relationship.

== Cast ==
- Lauren Bacall as Edwige
- Anthony Quinn as Dr. Gabriel Todd
- Jean-Pierre Aumont as Alphonse
- Lila Kedrova as Simone
- Jacques Marin as Raymond
- Francesco Quinn as Young Gabriel Todd
- Colin Fox as Doctor
