= Joel Homan =

American child actor (b. 1994)

- Born: Joel Homan; United States
- Occupation: Actor
- Years active: 1999–2006

Joel Homan (born November 1994) is a former American child actor. He is best known for his role as Dominic Hughes in the CBS sitcom Yes, Dear.

== Career ==
Homan got his first acting role on an episode of the CBS series L.A. Doctors. From there, he was cast on a new CBS sitcom Yes, Dear in 2000, beginning with the show's third episode until the series ended in 2006, playing the role of Dominic Hughes, the eldest child of Jimmy (Mike O'Malley) and Christine Hughes (Liza Snyder). Despite being a child actor, he was credited as part of the main cast, unlike the other children in the series. In 2003, he was cast in The Italian Job, the 2003 remake of the original film, playing the younger version of Mark Wahlberg's character Charlie Croker.

In 2006, he was nominated for the award for the Best Performance in a TV series - Supporting Young Actor (Comedy) at the 27th Young Artist Awards for his performance on Yes, Dear, which was won by Angus T. Jones.

== Filmography ==
=== Television ===
Year	Title	Role	Notes
1999	L.A. Doctors	Zach Field	Episode: "Denial"
2000–2006	Yes, Dear	Dominic Hughes	Main Role, 103 episodes Nominated - Best Performance in a TV series - Supporting Young Actor (Comedy) (2006)

=== Film ===
Year	Title	Role	Notes
2003	The Italian Job	Young Charlie	Film debut

== Award nominations ==
Year	Result	Award	Category	Work
2006	Nominated	Young Artist Awards	Best Performance in a TV Series (Comedy): Supporting Young Actor	Yes, Dear
