= Yes, Dear =

American television sitcom (2000–2006)

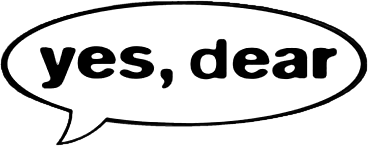
- Genre: Sitcom
- Created by: Alan Kirschenbaum; Gregory Thomas Garcia
- Starring: Anthony Clark; Jean Louisa Kelly; Mike O'Malley; Liza Snyder; Joel Homan
- Opening theme: Composed by Rick Marotta; "Family Is Family" performed and written by Bill Janovitz
- Composer: Rick Marotta
- Country of origin: United States
- Original language: English
- No. of seasons: 6
- No. of episodes: 122 (list of episodes)

Production
- Executive producers: Alan Kirschenbaum; Gregory Thomas Garcia
- Producers: Jay Kleckner; Patrick McCarthy; Bobby Bowman; Erika Kaestle
- Camera setup: Multi-camera
- Running time: 22 minutes
- Production companies: Amigos de Garcia Productions; Cherry Tree Entertainment; CBS Productions; 20th Century Fox Television

Original release
- Network: CBS
- Release: October 2, 2000 – February 15, 2006

Yes, Dear (stylized in all lowercase) is an American sitcom created by Alan Kirschenbaum and Gregory Garcia that originally ran on CBS for six seasons, from October 2, 2000, to February 15, 2006, with a total of 122 episodes. It starred Anthony Clark, Jean Louisa Kelly, Mike O'Malley, Liza Snyder and Joel Homan and was produced by Amigos de Garcia Productions, Cherry Tree Entertainment, CBS Productions and 20th Century Fox Television.

Many critics panned the show when it premiered and anticipated cancellation during the first season. The show initially performed fairly well on CBS's Monday / Wednesday comedy line up. In March 2006, CBS canceled the series after six seasons due to low ratings; Clark was later hired to host NBC's Last Comic Standing.

== Premise ==
Greg Warner, a successful businessman in the film industry, and Kim, his level-headed stay-at-home wife, do their best to be the perfect parents to their young son Sammy (and later daughter Emily). Things become difficult when Kim's sister Christine and her husband Jimmy Hughes move into the Warners' guest house with their two rambunctious boys, Dominic and Logan.

== Episodes ==
Season	Episodes	Originally released		Average viewers (in millions)	Rank
Season	Episodes	First released	Last released	Average viewers (in millions)	Rank
1	24	October 2, 2000	May 14, 2001	13.1	#28
2	24	September 24, 2001	May 13, 2002	13.9	#21
3	24	September 23, 2002	May 19, 2003	13.3	#25
4	24	September 22, 2003	May 24, 2004	10.7	#40
5	11	February 16, 2005	May 18, 2005	9.2	#53
6	15	September 14, 2005	February 15, 2006	7.8	#85

== Cast ==
=== Main cast ===
- Anthony Clark as Gregory "Greg" Warner
- Jean Louisa Kelly as Kimberly "Kim" Warner (née Ludke)
- Mike O'Malley as James "Jimmy" Hughes Jr.
- Liza Snyder as Christine Hughes (née Ludke)

=== Recurring ===
==== Children ====
- Joel Homan as Dominic Hughes (Episodes 3–122) (credited as Main Cast)
- Anthony and Michael Bain as Sammy Warner
- Madison and Marissa Poer as Emily Warner (Seasons 4–6)
- Christopher and Nicholas Berry as Logan Hughes (Seasons 1–2)
- Alexander and Shawn Shapiro as Logan Hughes (Season 3 Ep 2–9)
- Brendon Baerg as Logan Hughes (Seasons 3–6)
  - A running gag in the later seasons involves Jimmy being confused when reflecting on Logan's childhood, by showing short scenes of each of Logan's various actors (i.e. Logan constantly being a different child and hence his appearance always changing)

==== Grandparents ====
- Tim Conway as Tom Warner (Greg's father)
- Vicki Lawrence as Natalie Warner (Greg's mother)
- Jerry Van Dyke as James "Big Jimmy" Hughes Sr. (Jimmy's father)
- Beth Grant as Kitty Hughes (Jimmy's mother)
- Dan Hedaya as Don Ludke (Kim and Christine's father)
- Alley Mills as Jenny Ludke (Kim and Christine's mother)

==== Co-workers ====
- Billy Gardell as Billy Colivita
- Phill Lewis as Roy Barr
- Brian Doyle-Murray as Mr. George Savitsky

== Ratings and cancellation ==
Yes, Dear performed well in the Nielsen ratings during its first three seasons, although it never ended any of its seasons ranked within the top 20 out of all the broadcast prime-time shows. The first four seasons each contained 24 episodes and ended the season ranked #28, #21, #25, and #40 respectively. CBS initially cancelled the series after the fourth season, but later decided to renew it for a shortened 13-episode fifth season, which ranked #53 at the end of the television season. CBS renewed the series again for another truncated season, ordering thirteen episodes for a sixth season, and the series finished the television season ranked #85 among primetime shows. Renewals were partly attributed to the studio agreeing to lower its license fee with CBS. Two episodes that were prevented from airing during season five, due to news preemptions, were pushed to season six.

Due to declining ratings, on May 15, 2006, CBS announced that Yes, Dear had been canceled after six seasons and 122 episodes. Series star Anthony Clark went on to host one season (Season 4) of NBC's Last Comic Standing in 2006.

== Syndication ==
Reruns of Yes, Dear aired on TBS from 2004 until 2012, Nick at Nite from 2012 until 2014, CMT from 2012 until 2013, and NickMom from 2013 until 2015.

== Connection with Raising Hope ==
In 2010, Garcia premiered a new show on Fox titled Raising Hope. The show had a few references to Yes, Dear.

In the third season, episode sixteen, Brian Doyle-Murray is shown as an executive of a Hollywood studio, a reference to his role as Mr. Savitsky.

In the next episode, Mike O'Malley and Liza Snyder reprise the roles of Jimmy and Christine Hughes, who have a habit of watching a sex video made by the Raising Hope characters of Virginia and Burt Chance. The characters of Dominic and Logan, from Yes, Dear, and the guest house are also referred to in the conversation. The character of Jimmy also makes another appearance in season four, episode 19, however, a different actress portrays Christine and is renamed Christy.
