= Jeff Meyer (director) =

American television director

- Occupation: Television director
- Years active: 1983–present

Jeff Meyer is an American television director. He has directed episodes of Everybody Loves Raymond, So Little Time, Coach, The Faculty, Still Standing and numerous episodes of Yes, Dear.
