= My Secret Identity =

Canadian-American television series

- The Cast of My Secret Identity
- Genre: Action; Adventure; Science fiction
- Created by: Fred Fox Jr.; Brian Levant
- Written by: Wilson Coneybeare; Fred Fox Jr.; David Garber; Richard Marcus; John May; Dawn Ritchie; Eric Weinthal
- Starring: Jerry O'Connell; Derek McGrath; Wanda Cannon; Marsha Moreau; Christopher Bolton
- Opening theme: "My Secret Identity"
- Composers: Fred Mollin (S1-2); Brad MacDonald (S3)
- Countries of origin: Canada; United States
- Original language: English
- No. of seasons: 3
- No. of episodes: 72 (list of episodes)

Production
- Executive producer: Martin J. Keltz
- Producers: John Delmage; Brian Levant; Paul Saltzman; Patrick Doyle (S3)
- Cinematography: Peter Benison; Brian R.R. Hebb
- Editor: Christopher Cooper
- Running time: 30 minutes
- Production companies: Sunrise Films; Scholastic Productions; Telefilm Canada; Universal Television

Original release
- Network: CTV (Canada); Syndication (United States)
- Release: October 9, 1988 – May 25, 1991

My Secret Identity is a television series starring Jerry O'Connell and Derek McGrath. Originally broadcast from October 9, 1988 to May 25, 1991 on CTV in Canada, the series also aired in syndication in the United States. It was later shown in reruns on the Sci-Fi Channel. The series won the 1989 International Emmy Award for Outstanding Achievement in Programming for Children and Young People.

== Synopsis ==
The series centers around 14-year-old Andrew Clements (O'Connell), who—while looking one day for his friend, Dr. Benjamin Jeffcoate (McGrath)—trips and is hit by a photon beam, causing him to develop superpowers. He uses these abilities to fight crime, solve personal problems, and help others. He hides his powers from his mother, sister, and friends with the exception of Jeffcoate. Andrew initially called himself Ultraman, but this was later dropped.

== Powers ==
In the first season, Andrew must carry around aerosol spray containers and use them to move through the air, as his flying ability is limited; he can make himself nearly weightless, and move up without any problems, but he cannot propel himself through the air or move down without some external force. Late in season 1, Jeffcoat gives him compressed air aerosols. He can jump quite high and do amazing flips. In the season 2, Andrew gains the ability to move through the air without the use of aerosol cans. Also, after being struck by the photon beam a second time in season 3, Andrew develops superhuman strength but loses his invulnerability.

Andrew temporarily loses his powers when exposed to radiation (e.g. electromagnetic waves and x-rays). In season one, episode 10, he loses his powers for 2–3 days after exposure to an x-ray at the dentist. Later in the series, he regains them immediately after the exposure stops.

== Setting and characters ==
The main setting of the show is Toronto, Ontario, Canada, in the fictional suburb of Briarwood. Andrew goes to Briarwood High, but his sister Erin goes to another school. Their father Robert died when Andrew was 10 (S3, E11) but Andrew seemingly met him in 1969 (S3, E8).

Dr. Jeffcoate (supposedly the fourth-smartest man in the world) is a close friend of the family who lives next door. He is attracted to Stephanie Clements but never tells her so.

== Cast ==
- Jerry O'Connell as Andrew Clements
- Derek McGrath as Dr. Benjamin Marion Jeffcoate
- Christopher Bolton as Kirk Stevens (1989–1991)
- Marsha Moreau as Erin Clements
- Wanda Cannon as Stephanie Clements
- Elizabeth Leslie as Ruth Schellenbach

== Novel ==
A novelization of the pilot episode, written by Jovial Bob Stine (R. L. Stine), was released in 1989.
