= Liza Snyder =

American actress (b. 1968)

- Born: March 20, 1968 (age 58); Northampton, Massachusetts, U.S.
- Occupation: Actress
- Years active: 1992–2020
- Known for: Sirens; Jesse; Yes, Dear; Man with a Plan
- Mother: Barbara Green

Liza Snyder (born March 20, 1968) is an American actress. She is known for her television roles, which include Officer Molly Whelan in the ABC (and syndicated) series Sirens, Linda in the NBC sitcom Jesse, Christine Hughes in the CBS sitcom Yes, Dear from 2000 to 2006, and Andi Burns in the CBS sitcom Man with a Plan from 2016 to 2020.

== Life and career ==
Snyder was born in Northampton, Massachusetts. Her father is a professor of theatre at Smith College, and her mother is a singer-songwriter. Her maternal grandparents were five-time Academy Award-winning composer, Johnny Green, and the actress and consumer reporter, Betty Furness. Snyder is a graduate of New York City's Neighborhood Playhouse School of the Theatre where she studied acting under the tutelage of Sanford Meisner.

Snyder began her career appearing in episodes of television dramas such as The Trials of Rosie O'Neill and Murder, She Wrote. In 1993, she landed the leading role of Molly Whelan in the ABC and then syndicated crime drama Sirens. After the series was canceled, she co-starred in two made-for-television movies, and guest starred on Chicago Hope, and Pacific Blue. From 1998 to 2000, she was a regular cast member in the NBC sitcom Jesse starring Christina Applegate. She made her big screen debut in a secondary role in Pay It Forward directed by Mimi Leder. Later in 2000, Snyder began starring as Christine Hughes on the CBS sitcom Yes, Dear. The series ended in 2006.

After Yes, Dear, Snyder had a five-year hiatus. In 2011, she returned to television with a guest starring role in an episode of House, playing a patient in need of a lung transplant. She reprised her Yes, Dear role in a 2013 episode of Raising Hope. In 2016, Snyder returned to regular series television work starring alongside Matt LeBlanc in the CBS sitcom Man with a Plan.

== Filmography ==
Year	Title	Role	Notes
1992	The Trials of Rosie O'Neill	N/A	Episode: "Double Bind"
1992	Down the Shore	Claire	Episode: "A Tale of Two Houses"
1993–1995	Sirens	Off. Molly Whelan	Main role, 22 episodes
1994	Murder, She Wrote	Jeannine Bonelli	Episode: "Proof in the Pudding"
1996	Innocent Victims	Angela Hennis	Television film
1996	Race Against Time: The Search for Sarah	Martha	Television film
1996	Chicago Hope	Serena Paretsky	Episode: "Papa's Got a Brand New Bag"
1997	Pacific Blue	Rebecca Santori	Episode: "Repeat Offenders"
1998–2000	Jesse	Linda	Main role, 42 episodes
2000	Pay It Forward	Michelle	Film
2000–2006	Yes, Dear	Christine Hughes	Main role, 122 episodes
2011	House	Vanessa	Episode: "Transplant"
2013	Raising Hope	Christine Hughes	Episode: "Sex, Clown and Videotape", Reprised role from Yes, Dear
2016–2020	Man with a Plan	Andi Burns	Main role, 69 episodes
