= Little Man Tate discography =

- Studio albums: 3
- Singles: 10
- B-sides: 18
- Music videos: 10

The discography of Little Man Tate, an English indie rock band, consists of 3 studio albums and 10 singles along with several accompanying music videos.

== Studio albums ==
List of studio albums, with selected details and peak chart positions
Title	Album details	Peak positions
Title	Album details	UK
About What You Know	Release date: 29 January 2007; Label: V2	27
Nothing Worth Having Comes Easy	Release date: 15 September 2008; Label: Skint	80
Welcome to the Rest of Your Life	Release date: 17 November 2023; Label: Best of Three	—

== Singles ==
Year	Single	Peak positions	Album
Year	Single	UK	Album
2002	"Overtime EP" (As The Moon)	—	Non-album single
2006	"The Agent"	117	Non-album single
2006	"What? What You Got?"	40	About What You Know
2006	"House Party at Boothy's"	29	About What You Know
2006	"Man I Hate Your Band"	26	About What You Know
2007	"Sexy in Latin"	20	About What You Know
2007	"This Must Be Love"	33	About What You Know
2007	"European Lover"	—	About What You Know
2007	"Boy in the Anorak"	—	Non-album single
2008	"What Your Boyfriend Said"	60	Nothing Worth Having Comes Easy
2008	"Hey Little Sweetie"	142	Nothing Worth Having Comes Easy
2009	"I Am Alive"	—	Non-album single
"—" denotes releases that did not chart

== Music videos ==
Year	Title	Notes
2006	"The Agent"	
2006	"What? What You Got?	Starred British actress Melissa Leigh
2006	"Young Offenders"	Non Single Official Video
2006	"Hello Miss Lovely (Demo)"	Non Single Fan Made Lego Video
2006	"House Party at Boothy's"	
2006	"Man I Hate Your Band"	
2007	"Sexy in Latin"	
2007	"This Must Be Love"	Starred veteran British actress Liz Smith
2007	"European Lover"	
2008	"What Your Boyfriend Said"	
2008	"Hey Little Sweetie"	

== Rare Songs/B-Sides ==
Track Name	Found On	Formats
75	Man I Hate Your Band	7" Number 2
A Week Off Work	European Lover	7" Number 1
Balko's Barren Patch	Sexy in Latin	CD
Bedroom Window	Overtime EP (As The Moon)	CD
Boy in the Anorak	http://www.littlemantate.co.uk	Free Download
Carry On	Overtime EP (As The Moon)	CD
Every Dog Has Its Day	http://www.littlemantate.co.uk	Free Download
Half Empty Glass	Sexy in Latin	7"
Hello Miss Lovely (So You Like My Jeans)?	This Must Be Love	CD / 7"
The Hero Gets The Girl (As The Moon)	https://www.youtube.com/watch?v=bS8Ut2ylYI4	-
Jenny Put The Record On	http://www.littlemantate.co.uk	Free Download
Just Can't Take It	The Agent	7"
Little Chicago	I Am Alive	CD / 7"
Lonely This Christmas	Mud cover	-
Louise	The Human League cover	-
Millennium Girl	Overtime EP (As The Moon)	CD
Nigel	Hey Little Sweetie	CD / 7" Picture Disc
Overtime	Overtime EP (As The Moon)	CD
Pay Days Thursday	Hey Little Sweetie	CD
Saved By a Chat Show	Man I Hate Your Band	CD / 7" Number 1
The Self Appreciation Club	This Must Be Love	CD / 7" Picture Disc
Shark Bite	What Your Boyfriend Said	CD / 7" Number 1
She Bought Shoes	What Your Boyfriend Said	CD / 7" Number 2
She's Become So Special	Sexy in Latin	7" Ltd
Sit Down	James cover	-
Song for Whoever	The Beautiful South cover	-
Suicide Tuesday	http://www.nme.com	Free Download
Teenager	House Party at Boothy's	CD / 7" Number 1
Tomorrow	James cover	-
Too Quick to Type	This Must Be Love	CD
The Trouble With Detox	http://www.nme.com	Free Download
Under Them Smiles	European Lover	CD
You and Me Might Be Alright You Know	About What You Know (iTunes version)	Download
Young Offenders	What? What You Got?	CD / 7"
