= NME Presents the Essential Bands 2006 =

NME Presents: The Essential Bands 2006

Compilation album by Various artists
- Released: November 13, 2006
- Recorded: 2006
- Genre: Britpop
- Label: Universal Music TV

NME Presents: The Essential Bands 2006 is a 2-disc CD released by Universal Music TV on November 13, 2006, featuring popular artists of the year. On some versions of the CD, The Fratellis is misspelled as The Fratelliss.

== Track listing ==
=== Disc 1 ===
1. "When You Were Young" (3:39) – The Killers
2. "America" (4:10) – Razorlight
3. "Monster" (3:42) – The Automatic
4. "Chelsea Dagger" (3:34) – The Fratellis
5. "When the Sun Goes Down" (3:34) – Arctic Monkeys
6. "Bang Bang, You're Dead" (3:32) – Dirty Pretty Things
7. "Lonely at the Top" (3:09) – The Ordinary Boys
8. "Suzie" (3:13) – Boy Kill Boy
9. "You Can Have It All" (Ian Brodie Remix) (4:21) – Kaiser Chiefs
10. "The Fallen" (3:42) – Franz Ferdinand
11. "Gold Lion" (3:06) – Yeah Yeah Yeahs
12. "Lost and Found" (2:55) – Feeder
13. "22 Grand Job" (1:46) – The Rakes
14. "X-Ray" (3:21) – The Maccabees
15. "Make Her Cry" (2:51) – The Marshals
16. "Get Myself Into It" (3:40) – The Rapture
17. "Ice Cream" (3:08) – New Young Pony Club
18. "London Bridge" (3:25) – Dogs
19. "Woman" (2:55) – Wolfmother
20. "House Party at Boothy's" (3:27) – Little Man Tate

=== Disc 2 ===
1. "Chasing Cars" (4:26) – Snow Patrol
2. "Is It Any Wonder?" (3:05) – Keane
3. "She Moves in Her Own Way" (2:49) – The Kooks
4. "Trains to Brazil" (3:44) – Guillemots
5. "Harrowdown Hill" (4:38) – Thom Yorke
6. "Blackened Blue Eyes" (4:20) – The Charlatans
7. "Albion" (5:25) – Babyshambles
8. "Nature's Law" (4:08) – Embrace
9. "So Here We Are" (3:50) – Bloc Party
10. "When the Night Feels My Song" (3:08) – Bedouin Soundclash
11. "Accident & Emergency" (3:16) – Patrick Wolf
12. "Young Folks" (4:38) – Peter Bjorn and John
13. "Ticket to Immortality" (3:59) – The Dears
14. "Rocky Took a Lover" (4:09) – Bell X1
15. "1" (2:35) – Joy Zipper
16. "Writer's Block" (3:41) – Just Jack
17. "You're Gonna Lose Us" (2:35) – The Cribs
18. "Send in the Boys" (2:45) – Milburn
19. "Sea of Trouble" (3:32) – Cord
20. "Elusive" (3:41) – Scott Matthews
