= Foreign Exchange Student =

Foreign Exchange Student may refer to:

- Student exchange program
- An episode of the TV show My Name Is Earl
