= 2007 British Academy Television Awards =

UK television awards ceremony

- Date: 20 May 2007
- Site: London Palladium
- Hosted by: Graham Norton

Highlights
- Best Comedy Series: That Mitchell and Webb Look
- Best Drama: The Street
- Best Actor: Jim Broadbent; Longford
- Best Actress: Victoria Wood; Housewife, 49
- Best Comedy Performance: Ricky Gervais Extras

Television coverage
- Channel: BBC One
- Ratings: 5.08 million

The 2007 British Academy Television Awards were held on Sunday 20 May at the London Palladium Theatre in London. They were broadcast live on BBC One in the UK. The nominations were announced on 11 April 2007.

== Winners and nominees ==
Winners in bold.

- **Best Actor**
  - **Jim Broadbent — Longford (Channel 4)**
  - Andy Serkis — Longford (Channel 4)
  - Michael Sheen — Kenneth Williams: Fantabulosa! (BBC Four)
  - John Simm — Life on Mars (BBC One)
- **Best Actress**
  - **Victoria Wood — Housewife, 49 (ITV)**
  - Anne-Marie Duff — The Virgin Queen (BBC One)
  - Samantha Morton — Longford (Channel 4)
  - Ruth Wilson — Jane Eyre (BBC One)
- **Best Comedy Performance**
  - **Ricky Gervais — Extras (BBC Two)**
  - Dawn French — The Vicar of Dibley (BBC One)
  - Stephen Merchant — Extras (BBC Two)
  - Liz Smith — The Royle Family: Queen of Sheba (BBC One)
- **Best Comedy Programme**
  - **That Mitchell and Webb Look (BBC Two)**
  - Little Miss Jocelyn (BBC Three)
  - The Catherine Tate Show (BBC Two)
  - Little Britain Abroad (BBC One)
- **Best Continuing Drama**
  - **Casualty (BBC One)**
  - Coronation Street (ITV)
  - EastEnders (BBC One)
  - Emmerdale (ITV)
- **Best Drama Serial**
  - **See No Evil: The Moors Murders (ITV)**
  - Low Winter Sun (Channel 4)
  - Prime Suspect: The Final Act (ITV)
  - The Virgin Queen (Channel 4)
- **Best Drama Series**
  - **The Street (BBC)**
  - Life on Mars (BBC One)
  - Sugar Rush (Channel 4)
  - Shameless (Channel 4)
- **Best Entertainment Performance**
  - **Jonathan Ross — Friday Night with Jonathan Ross (BBC One)**
  - Stephen Fry — QI (BBC Two)
  - Anthony McPartlin & Declan Donnelly — Ant & Dec's Saturday Night Takeaway (ITV)
  - Paul Merton — Have I Got News for You (BBC One)
- **Best Entertainment Programme**
  - **The X Factor (ITV)**
  - Dancing on Ice (ITV)
  - Derren Brown: The Heist (Channel 4)
  - How Do You Solve a Problem Like Maria? (BBC One)
- **Best Factual Series**
  - **Ross Kemp on Gangs (Sky One)**
  - Stephen Fry: The Secret Life of the Manic Depressive (BBC Two)
  - Tribe (BBC Two)
  - Who Do You Think You Are? (BBC)
- **Best Features**
  - **The Choir (BBC Two)**
  - The Apprentice (BBC)
  - Dragons' Den (BBC Two)
  - The F-Word (Channel 4)
- **Best News Coverage**
  - **Granada Reports — Morecambe Bay (ITV)**
  - BBC Ten O'Clock News — Terrorism plot at Heathrow
  - Channel 4 News — News from Iran
  - ITV Evening News — the Israel/Lebanon crisis
- **Best Single Documentary**
  - **Evicted (BBC One)**
  - Breaking Up with the Joneses (Channel 4)
  - 9/11: The Falling Man (Channel 4)
  - Rain in My Heart (BBC Two)
- **Best Single Drama**
  - **Housewife, 49 (ITV)**
  - Kenneth Williams: Fantabulosa! (BBC Four)
  - Longford (Channel 4)
  - The Road To Guantanamo (Channel 4)
- **Best Situation Comedy**
  - **The Royle Family (BBC)**
  - Green Wing (Channel 4)
  - The IT Crowd (Channel 4)
  - Pulling (BBC Three)
- **Best Specialist Factual**
  - **Nuremberg: Goering's Last Stand (Channel 4)**
  - Planet Earth (BBC)
  - Munich: Mossad's Revenge (Channel 4)
  - Simon Schama's Power of Art (BBC Two)
- **Best Sport**
  - **F1: Hungarian Grand Prix — Jenson Button's First Win (ITV)**
  - The Boat Race (ITV)
  - Cricket on Five (Five)
  - 2006 Winter Olympics (BBC Two)
- **Interactivity**
  - **Terry Pratchett's Hogfather (Sky One)**
  - Dispatches - War Torn: Stories of Separation (Channel 4)
  - Meltdown and the Big Climate Experiment (BBC Four)
  - The Secret Policeman's Ball (Channel 4)
- **International**
  - **Entourage (ITV2)**
  - House (Five)
  - Lost (Sky One)
  - My Name Is Earl (Channel 4)
- **Pioneer Audience Award**
  - **Life on Mars (BBC One)**
  - The Royle Family: Queen of Sheba (BBC One)
  - Dragons' Den (BBC Two)
  - The Vicar of Dibley Christmas Special (BBC One)
  - Planet Earth (BBC One)
  - Celebrity Big Brother (Channel 4)
- **Special Award**
  - Winner: Andy Harries
- **Fellowship Award**
  - Winner: Richard Curtis

== Controversy ==
When presenting Ricky Gervais with the award for best comedy performance Joan Rivers referred to her cousin as a "Jew with a harelip". Gareth Davies, the Chief Executive of the Cleft Lip and Palate Association (CLAPA) wrote to BAFTA to express his "serious disappointment" at the incident and said that "many people found the old-fashioned term "harelip" highly offensive and that "making the condition the subject of a cheap joke was simply hurtful"

Rivers later said that she was extremely sorry for any offence caused and this had certainly not been her intention. Amanda Berry, BAFTA Chief Executive, stated that the Academy would "never set out to offend nor make fun of anyone". CLAPA said they were pleased to receive the apologies but is also aware that too many people are still ill-informed about what cleft lip and palate is and what it is not. They added that this ignorance can often feed into prejudice and the media and those in the public eye have a key role in helping the association to de-stigmatise the condition.
