= Amanda Berry =

Amanda Berry may refer to:

- Amanda Marie Berry (born 1986), Cleveland kidnapping survivor
- Amanda Berry (film executive) (born 1961), Chief Executive of the British Academy of Film and Television Arts (BAFTA)
- Amanda Smith (1837–1915), née Berry, American religious leader and former slave

== See also ==
- Amanda Barrie (born 1935), English actress
- Palm Beach (1980 film), in which another Amanda Berry was cast
