= List of firefighting films =

The following criteria qualify a film for inclusion on this list:

- Primary plot of film regards firefighting or related fire/rescue service work in general.
- Primary plot of the film involves firefighters or their personal lives as affected by their firefighting.
- Noteworthy attention is given to firefighting activities.

This list includes documentaries and TV series.

== Fiction ==
- 15 Minutes (2001)
- The 119 (TV 1987) (unaired)
- 9-1-1 (TV 2018)
- Ablaze (2019)
- Ablaze (2001)
- The Accidental Husband (2008)
- Always (1989)
- As the Light Goes Out (2014)
- Asphalt City (2024)
- Backdraft (1991)
- Bad Day on the Block (1997)
- The Bells Go Down (1943)
- Blue Smoke (2007)
- Burning Flame (2009)
- Chicago Fire (TV 2012)
- City on Fire (1979)
- Code Red (TV 1981)
- Collateral Damage (2002)
- A Dangerous Summer (A.K.A. Flash Fire; 1981)
- Emergency! (TV 1972)
- Emergency: The Convention (TV 1979)
- Emergency: Greatest Rescues of Emergency! (TV 1979)
- Emergency: Most Deadly Passage (TV 1978)
- Emergency: The Steel Inferno (TV 1978)
- Emergency: Survival on Charter #220 (TV 1978)
- Emergency: What's a Nice Girl Like You Doing... (TV 1979)
- The Fallen (2009)
- False Alarms (1936)
- Fire! (1901)
- Fire! (TV 1977)
- The Fire Alarm (1935)
- The Fire Brigade (1926)
- Fire Cheese (1941)
- Fire Country (TV 2022)
- Fire on Kelly Mountain (TV 1973)
- Fire Serpent (TV 2007)
- Fire, Trapped on the 37th Floor (TV 1991)
- Firefight (2003)
- Firefighter (TV 1986)
- Firefighter (TV 2005)
- The Firefighters (British, 1975)
- Fireheart (2022)
- Firehouse (TV 1974)
- Firehouse (1987)
- Firehouse (1997)
- Firehouse Dog (2007)
- The Fireman (1916)
- Fireman Sam (1987-present)
- Fireproof (2008)
- Fires (2021)
- Fires Were Started (A.K.A. I Was a Fireman; 1943)
- Firestorm (1998)
- Flames (1932)
- Flat Foot Stooges (1938)
- Frequency (2000)
- The Garage (A.K.A. Fire Chief; 1920)
- Going to the Fire (1896, Edison Films)
- The Guys (2002)
- H.E.L.P. (TV 1990)
- Heaven's Fire (TV 1999)
- Hellfighters (1968)
- Heroes of the Flames (1931)
- Holy Joe (1999)
- Hook and Ladder (1932)
- I Do (But I Don't) (2004)
- I Now Pronounce You Chuck and Larry (2007)
- In Old Chicago (1937)
- Inferno (2001)
- Into the Fire (TV 2005)
- Juvenile Fire Department (1903)
- Ladder 49 (2004)
- Life of an American Fireman (1903)
- Lifeline (1997, Hong Kong)
- London's Burning (television film and series, 1986)
- Mickey's Fire Brigade (1935)
- The Morning Alarm (1896)
- A Morning Alarm (1896, Edison Films)
- On Fire (1987)
- On Fire (1996, Hong Kong)
- One True Love (2000, Lifetime Movie)
- Only the Brave (2017)
- Out of Inferno (2013, Hong Kong)
- Pine Canyon Is Burning (1977)
- Planes: Fire & Rescue (2014)
- Playing with Fire (1985)
- Playing with Fire (2008)
- Playing with Fire (2019)
- Point of Origin (TV 2002)
- Promare (2019)
- Pyromaniac (2016, Norway) (Pyromanen)
- Quarantine (2008)
- Red Skies of Montana (1952)
- Rescue 8 (1958)
- Rescue Me (TV 2004)
- Rookie Fireman (1950)
- Scorched (2008)
- She Loved a Fireman (1937)
- Skyscraper (2018)
- Smoke Jumpers (A.K.A. In the Line of Duty: Smoke Jumpers; 1996)
- Station 19 (TV 2018)
- Superfire (TV 2002)
- Tacoma FD (TV 2019)
- Third Watch (TV 1999)
- Those Who Wish Me Dead (2021)
- The Tower (2012 South Korean film)
- The Towering Inferno (1974)
- Trapped in a Forest Fire (1913)
- Trespass (1992)
- Trial by Fire (A.K.A. Smoke Jumper; 2008)
- Turk 182 (1985)
- Turn Out of the Cardiff Fire Brigade (1924)
- Volcano (1997)
- Where's That Fire? (1940)

== Non-fiction ==
- 102 Minutes that Changed America (TV 2008)
- 343 (2007)
- 9/11 (TV 2002)
- 9/11: The Falling Man (TV 2006)
- Ablaze (2019 film), New Zealand telemovie
- The Academy: Orange County Fire Authority Recruit Class 36 (FOX reality TV 2009)
- America Burning: The Yarnell Hill Fire Tragedy and the Nation's Wildfire Crisis (Weather Channel 2014)
- Angels Too Soon (WTTV 2003)
- Answering the Call: Ground Zero's Volunteers (TV 2006)
- The Big Burn (PBS 2019)
- Brave Are The Fallen (2020)
- "The Bronx is Burning" (episode of Man Alive, TV 1972, BBC)
- Brotherhood: Life in the FDNY (2005)
- Burn (2012)
- Burned: The Science of Arson (TV: 20/20 episode May 7, 2010)
- Crash Landing: The Rescue of Flight 232 (A.K.A. A Thousand Heroes, TV 1992)
- Detroit on Fire: A Documentary (Constance York 2011)
- Dust to Dust: The Health Effects of 9/11 (TV 2006)
- Escape: Because Accidents Happen: Fire (TV NOVA 1999)
- "Fire Wars" (episode of NOVA, TV 2002)
- Firefighters: Brothers in Battle (1991)
- Firehouse USA: Boston (TV 2005)
- Fires of Kuwait (1992)
- Firestorm: Last Stand at Yellowstone (TV 2006)
- First In (TV)
- A Good Job: Stories of the FDNY (TV 2014 HBO)
- How to Survive a Disaster (BBC Horizon 2 2008)
- Hunt for the Serial Arsonist (TV NOVA 1995)
- Into the Fire (2007)
- Modern Marvels "Firefighting! Extreme Conditions" (S12E72 TV: History Channel 2004)
- Modern Marvels "Oil Firefighting" (S11E08 TV: History Channel 2004)
- Modern Marvels "The Arson Detectives" (S11E46 TV: History Channel 2004)
- New York's Bravest - A Firefighting Odyssey (2005)
- Only the Brave (2017)
- The Price of Fire (1960), National Film Board of Canada, educational documentary
- Pyromania (TV Mania, S01E03)
- Q.E.D. The Burning Question: A Case of Spontaneous Human Combustion (BBC TV 1998)
- Ricky's Rib Shack, a Firefighter's Journey (2008)
- Toxic Hot Seat (HBO 2013)
- Toxic Soup: The Politics of Pollution (2011)
- The Triangle Factory Fire Scandal (1979)
- Triangle Fire (PBS American Experience 2011)
- Tunnel Inferno: Mont Blanc Tunnel Fire (TV Seconds From Disaster S01E02)
- Twin Towers (2002)
- Without Warning: Terror in the Towers (TV 1993)
- The Women of Ground Zero (2002)
- World Trade Center (2006)
