= My Name Is Earl =

American television sitcom (2005–2009)

- Genre: Sitcom
- Created by: Greg Garcia
- Showrunner: Greg Garcia
- Starring: Jason Lee; Ethan Suplee; Jaime Pressly; Nadine Velazquez; Eddie Steeples
- Narrated by: Jason Lee
- Composers: Danny Lux; Mark Leggett
- Country of origin: United States
- Original language: English
- No. of seasons: 4
- No. of episodes: 96 (list of episodes)

Production
- Executive producers: Greg Garcia; Marc Buckland; Bobby Bowman
- Producers: Jason Lee; Henry J. Lange Jr.; Danielle Sanchez-Witzel; John Hoberg; Michael Pennie; Kat Likkel; Mike Mariano; Jessica Goldstein; Hilary Winston; Chrissy Pietrosh
- Camera setup: Single-camera
- Running time: 19–24 minutes
- Production companies: Amigos de Garcia Productions; 20th Century Fox Television

Original release
- Network: NBC
- Release: September 20, 2005 – May 14, 2009

Related
- Raising Hope

My Name Is Earl is an American television sitcom created by Greg Garcia for NBC. It aired for four seasons from September 20, 2005, to May 14, 2009, with a total of 96 episodes. It was produced by Amigos de Garcia Productions in association with 20th Century Fox Television, and starred Jason Lee as the title character, Earl Hickey, a small-time thief with a messed-up life who discovers karma. The series also starred Ethan Suplee, Jaime Pressly, Nadine Velazquez, and Eddie Steeples.

== Synopsis ==
Earl Hickey is a small-time thief, living in the fictional rural town of Camden, who loses his winning $100,000 lottery ticket after being hit by a car while he celebrates his good fortune. Lying in a hospital bed, he learns about karma during an episode of the talk show Last Call with Carson Daly. Convinced he has to turn his life around to be happy, Earl gives himself over to the power of karma. He makes a list of every bad thing that he has ever done and every person that he has ever wronged, and makes efforts to fix them all. After doing a first good deed, he finds the $100,000 lottery ticket that he had lost. Seeing this as a sign of karma rewarding him for his commitment, Earl uses his new-found wealth to do more good deeds according to his list.

Earl's wife, Joy, throws him out, keeping her two children — Dodge, whom she conceived before getting together with Earl, and Earl Jr., who was fathered during their marriage, but not by Earl. Earl moves into a motel and lives with his brother Randy, and they meet Catalina, the motel's beautiful maid who illegally migrated from somewhere in Latin America. Earl works on the list which mostly involves strangers and old acquaintances he has wronged, but also contains items involving his family. Initially, Joy plots to kill or blackmail Earl for his lottery winnings, but later gives up. Joy marries Darnell Turner, a mutual friend who works at a local restaurant called the Crab Shack, and with whom she had been having an affair. Until late in Season Four, it is generally accepted that Darnell fathered Earl Jr. In the Season One finale, Earl discovers he had bought the lotto tickets using money he stole from another person, but when he tries to return his winnings to that person, the latter is inflicted with bad karma, so he returns the money to Earl.

The second season has Earl continuing to work on his list. Joy gets in trouble when she steals a delivery truck, and ends up kidnapping and assaulting the member of staff who was inside. Joy is arrested for felonies that would put her in prison for life because it was her third strike. To soften the jury, she decides to have a surrogate baby for her half-sister Liberty Washington and Liberty's husband Ray-Ray. Meanwhile, Catalina has been deported. Earl and Randy visit her home village in Latin America, and Randy marries Catalina in a green card marriage so she can return to the United States. In the season finale, Earl sacrifices himself at Joy's trial by confessing to all of her crimes and is sentenced to two years in a state penitentiary.

In the third season, Earl is still imprisoned, but continues to do good deeds despite not having his list on him. He meets Frank, from whom he had rented the trailer in which Joy and her husband Darnell now live, while Randy gets a job as a prison guard to be closer to Earl. Meanwhile, Joy gives birth to Liberty and Ray-Ray's baby. Earl's good deeds attract the attention of the state warden, Jerry, who offers Earl a reduction in prison time for helping him resolve his issues. When Earl is about to leave, Jerry revokes Earl's reductions as he would lose such a productive helper, but Earl eventually gains the upper hand and forces Jerry to honor his early release. After leaving prison, Earl loses his confidence in the list; he has spent years and the last of his lottery winnings doing good things, but he has nothing to show for it and is insistent that karma should have given him some kind of lasting reward by now. He reverts to his old, malicious ways, doing cruel and illegal things. Frank's ex-girlfriend Billie Cunningham hits Earl with her car and puts him into a coma, then is subsequently struck by a car as well. Randy is able to revive Earl by working on the list. Earl finds Billie and marries her, thinking she is karma's reward for his years of effort. When Earl and Billie argue over the list, and Earl chooses the list over her, Billie goes into a rampage that undoes his good deeds. However, when Billie hides in the Amish-like "Camdenite" settlement, she has a change of heart. She divorces Earl and gives him the rest of her insurance settlement money, which helps him continue the list.

The fourth season goes back to focusing on Earl doing good deeds to cross off his list. A major story arc during this season was that Darnell, who is actually a former assassin from a secret government agency, blows his witness protection cover. He, Joy, and his family are forced to change identities and relocate until Darnell's father, who is also from the agency, goes on a mission with Darnell which clears Darnell's family of needing protection. In the season finale, Earl and the gang learn, from DNA test results, that Earl is actually Dodge's biological father. Earl still has not finished his list as of the season's conclusion, and there is a cliffhanger: it is proven that Darnell is not Earl Jr.'s father, revealing that Joy had another affair.

== Main cast ==
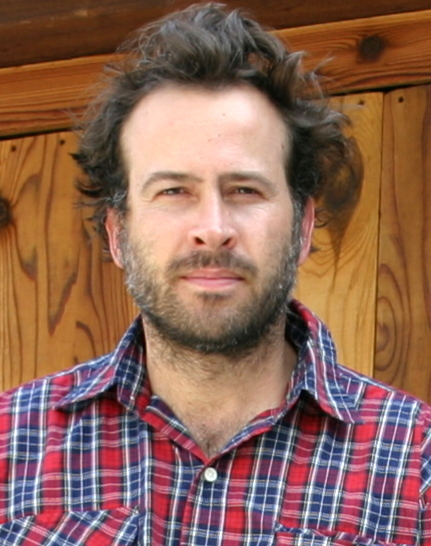
Jason Lee portrayed Earl Hickey in the series

- Jason Lee as Earl Hickey, a small-time thief who turns his life around after winning money on a lottery scratcher, compiling a list of wrongs that he plans to make amends for.
- Ethan Suplee as Randy Hickey, Earl's dim-witted & lazy younger brother.
- Jaime Pressly as Joy Turner, Earl's ex-wife who lives in a trailer park.
- Nadine Velazquez as Catalina Aruca, the maid at the motel where Earl and Randy reside.
- Eddie Steeples as Darnell Turner, a worker at the local restaurant that Earl and the gang frequent. He marries Joy in season 1.

== Production ==
=== Conception ===
Creator and head writer Greg Garcia wrote the pilot while working on another sitcom, Yes, Dear. He initially pitched the series to Fox, which passed on it. He then approached NBC, which optioned the pilot on a cast-contingent basis, meaning they would order the pilot provided a suitable cast could be assembled. Jason Lee was approached for the lead role, but was uninterested in working in television and passed on the series twice before finally agreeing to read the pilot script. Though he liked the pilot, he was hesitant to commit to his first TV starring role until meeting with Garcia, after which he signed on to play Earl Hickey.

=== Locations ===
My Name Is Earl is set in fictional Camden County. Creator Greg Garcia says:

The show doesn't technically take place anywhere....we like to think it's anywhere. We don't really say exactly where it is.
—Greg Garcia

In the episode "BB", Earl's driver's license address is at "Pimmit Hills Trailer Park, Space C-13, Camden County", but the state is not listed. Creator Greg Garcia said that Camden County is loosely modeled on Pimmit Hills, Virginia, the neighborhood where he grew up. The filming location in Los Angeles was not a trailer park, but was built up to look like one.

Many of the locations were filmed in San Fernando Valley in California. In the season 1 episode "The Professor", Earl receives a postcard from Alex with the address "Earl Hickey, The Palms Hotel RM 231, 9005 Lincoln Blvd, Camden USA" with Earl's hand covering up most of the postmark. The Palms Motel structure is actually a motel in North Hills, California, now named the Palm Tree Inn Motel. It was also used to film other shows and films such as Gilmore Girls, The Mentalist, and Heroes. Exterior shots of the Crab Shack and Club Chubby were also taken from locations in Van Nuys and North Hills. Houses and shops for the various characters come from locations in Van Nuys, Santa Clarita, Northridge, Moorpark, Los Angeles, and other Southern California cities. In the episode "Didn't Pay Taxes", Earl and Randy climb the landmark Artesia Water Tower, although they do not refer to it by name.

Other episodes have listed states that were unlikely to have Camden County. In the episode "Our Other Cops is On", officer Stuart Daniels states that his surveillance equipment was "supposed to go to Camden, New Jersey, but came here instead". In "Earl and Joy's Anniversary", when killer bees have invaded Camden and then left, Iqball says that the bees are heading for Texas. The flashback episodes "Inside Probe" describe Camden County as trying to stay independent during the American Civil War and forming its own country called Central, which lasted less than a day. In episode "Y2K", Joy states that she "may move to Florida", while in episode "BB" Randy suggests they go to Arizona.

In season 1 episode 7, "Stole Beer from a Golfer", Hagerstown and Cumberland are mentioned and assumed to be relatively nearby as Earl and Randy are on busses traveling opposite directions. The state of Maryland isn't mentioned in the episode, but in real life these towns are both in Maryland about 70 miles apart off Interstate 68.

=== Cancellation, future and potential reboot ===
The series was cancelled abruptly on May 19, 2009, after running for four seasons. Season four had ended with the caption 'To Be Continued'. The series' producer, 20th Century Fox Television, approached the Fox, TBS and TNT networks to continue the series, but they were unable to come to terms without "seriously undermining the artistic integrity of the series." In a May 2009 interview, Ethan Suplee said "Ultimately there are just a couple more episodes that I'd like to see done. It doesn't have to be the show that runs infinitely, but there are a few episodes that (creator Greg Garcia) wanted to make, that I was excited about making", meaning that writing already had started for a fifth season.

In October 2011, Jason Lee told E! Online he has been in talks with Greg Garcia to finish the list via a movie, possibly to be released online.

On October 1, 2013, creator Greg Garcia participated in an "Ask Me Anything" (AMA) on Reddit. One person asked "Who was Earl Jr's. real father and did Earl ever finish the list?"

Garcia replied:

We never really got the chance to fully figure it out but the talk in the writers room was that Earl Jr.'s Dad was going to be someone famous. Like Dave Chappelle or Lil Jon. Someone that came to town on tour and Joy slept with. But when we got canceled we never got the chance to figure it out. I was worried about doing a cliffhanger but I asked NBC if it was safe to do one at the end of the season and they told me it was. I guess it wasn't. I had always had an ending to Earl and I'm sorry I didn't get the chance to see it happen. You've got a show about a guy with a list so not seeing him finish it is a bummer. But the truth is, he wasn't ever going to finish the list. The basic idea of the ending was that while he was stuck on a really hard list item he was going to start to get frustrated that he was never going to finish it. Then he runs into someone who had a list of their own and Earl was on it. They needed to make up for something bad they had done to Earl. He asks them where they got the idea of making a list and they tell him that someone came to them with a list and that person got the idea from someone else. Earl eventually realizes that his list started a chain reaction of people with lists and that he's finally put more good into the world than bad. So at that point he was going to tear up his list and go live his life. Walk into the sunset a free man. With good karma and finally at peace with what he's accomplished.

In 2023, Ethan Suplee explained during an episode of the Slick & Thick podcast exactly what led to the show being cancelled:

We were a hit. And the network called the studio and said, 'We want to license the show for another year,' and the studio said, 'Well, we want more money. We want to renegotiate our deal with you.' And the network basically did not respond for two weeks. And then the studio called back and said, 'We'll take your deal,' and the network said, 'Too late.'

In July 2023, Suplee said that everybody involved with the show has previously said that they would do a reboot or a film of the show, and that Garcia pitched a reboot to a number of studios. Suplee said that he found it unlikely that a reboot would happen.

== Reception ==
=== Critical response ===
The show was well-received by critics and audiences alike. One reviewer speculated that Earl's forthrightness to having led a life of idiocy is what endears him to the viewer, and suggests there is a depth to his character beyond what is initially seen.

==== Allegations of Scientology influence ====
Some critics questioned if the series had been influenced by Scientology, with actors Jason Lee (who left Scientology in 2016) and Ethan Suplee being Scientologists at that time; the show also featured guest appearances from high-profile Scientologist actors including Michael Peña, Juliette Lewis and Giovanni Ribisi. In 2008, Alec Baldwin publicly named Earl creator Greg Garcia as being a Scientologist; Garcia quickly denied any involvement with Scientology, claiming that the Daily Mirror had incorrectly reported him to be a Scientologist.

=== Ratings ===
The series premiered on September 20, 2005, drew in 14.9 million viewers in the United States, earning a 6.6 rating. By the airing of the third episode it was apparent that My Name Is Earl was the highest rated of NBC's new fall offerings, and a full season (22 episodes) was ordered. In its first month, it was also the highest rated new sitcom of the season to air on any network and was the highest rated sitcom on any network in the 18–49-year-old demographic. The show was renewed for a second (2006–07), a third (2007–08), and a fourth season (2008–09).

Season	Timeslot (EDT)	Season Premiere	Season Finale	TV Season	Viewers (in millions)
1	Tuesday 9:00 pm (Episodes 1–10) Thursday 9:00 pm (Episodes 11–24)	September 20, 2005	May 11, 2006	2005–06	10.9
2	Thursday 8:00 pm	September 21, 2006	May 10, 2007	2006–07	8.9
3	Thursday 8:00 pm	September 27, 2007	May 15, 2008	2007–08	7.3
4	Thursday 8:00 pm	September 25, 2008	May 14, 2009	2008–09	6.6

=== Awards and nominations ===
The series was nominated twice for Best International Programme at the British Academy Television Awards in 2007 and 2008. The pilot episode won Emmy awards for Outstanding Writing and Directing in a Comedy Series for Greg Garcia and Marc Buckland respectively at the 58th Primetime Emmy Awards. Jaime Pressly won for Outstanding Supporting Actress in a Comedy series at the 59th Primetime Emmy Awards. Other Emmy nominations include Beau Bridges and Giovanni Ribisi for Outstanding Guest Actor in a Comedy Series.

== Episodes ==
Series overview for My Name Is Earl
Season	Episodes	Originally released		Average viewership (in millions)
Season	Episodes	First released	Last released	Average viewership (in millions)
1	24	September 20, 2005	May 11, 2006	11.38 (Note: Multiple references; for the first season, see: Episode 1: Episode 2: Episode 3: Episode 4: Episode 5: Episode 6: Episode 7: Episode 8: Episode 9: Episode 10: Episode 11: Episode 12: Episode 13: Episode 14: Episode 15: Episode 16: Episode 17: Episode 18: Episode 19: Episode 20: Episode 21: Episode 22: Episode 23: Episode 24:)
2	23	September 21, 2006	May 10, 2007	8.62 (Note: Multiple references; for the second season, see: Episode 1: Episode 2: Episode 3: Episode 4: Episode 5: Episode 6: Episode 7: Episode 8: Episode 9: Episodes 10 and 11: Episode 12: Episode 13: Episode 14: Episode 15: Episode 16: Episode 17: Episode 18: Episode 19: Episode 20: Episode 21: Episode 22: Episode 23:)
3	22	September 27, 2007	May 15, 2008	7.08 (Note: Multiple references; for the third season, see: Episodes 1 and 2: Episode 3: Episode 4: Episode 5: Episode 6: Episodes 7 and 8: Episode 9: Episode 10: Episode 11: Episode 12: Episode 13: Episodes 14 and 15: Episode 16: Episode 17: Episode 18: Episode 19: Episode 20: Episodes 21 and 22:)
4	27	September 25, 2008	May 14, 2009	6.23 (Note: Multiple references; for the fourth season, see: Episodes 1 and 2: Episodes 3 and 4: Episode 5: Episode 6: Episode 7: Episode 8: Episode 9: Episode 10: Episode 11: Episode 12: Episode 13: Episode 14: Episode 15: Episode 16: Episode 17: Episode 18: Episode 19: Episode 20: Episode 21: Episode 22: Episode 23: Episode 24: Episode 25: Episode 26: Episode 27:)

== Home media ==
DVD Name	Release dates		Ep #	Additional Information
DVD Name	Region 1	Region 2	Ep #	Additional Information
Season One	September 19, 2006	September 25, 2006	24	The four-disc box set includes all 24 episodes of the season. Bonus features include deleted scenes, commentary tracks on selected episodes, selections from the season's gag reel, and a "mini-episode" vignette where Stewie Griffin from Family Guy influences Earl to get revenge on everyone who wronged him.
Season Two	September 25, 2007	January 28, 2008	23	The four-disc box set includes all 23 episodes of the season. Bonus features include deleted scenes, commentary tracks on selected episodes, as well as other featurettes.
Season Three	September 30, 2008	October 20, 2008	22	The four-disc box set includes all 22 episodes of the season. Bonus features include a gag reel, "Creating the characters" featurette and deleted scenes.
Season Four	September 15, 2009	October 5, 2009	27	The four-disc box set includes all 27 episodes of the final season. Bonus features include deleted scenes, a gag reel, "Earl's Fan Mail" featurette and a movie trailer inspired by the premiere episode. Also released on Blu-ray.

== Syndication ==
20th Century Fox Television has cleared My Name Is Earl in nearly 50% of the U.S., said Bob Cook, the company's president and chief operating officer. 20th had sold the off-net sitcom to the Fox, Tribune, CBS, Hearst-Argyle, and Sinclair station groups for a fall 2009 debut.

My Name Is Earl aired in off-network syndication and on TBS, Ion Television, and MyNetworkTV in the United States. The series premiered in January 2006 on Channel 4 in the UK. The fourth season was shown on E4 in October 2008. In 2013, 5Star gained the repeat rights to the series. The show was repeated on Comedy Central Extra from March 5, 2018.

== See also ==
- List of My Name Is Earl episodes
- List of My Name Is Earl characters
- 100 Deeds for Eddie McDowd
- Quantum Leap
