= Liz Smith (actress) =

English actress (1921–2016)

Liz Smith MBE
- Smith in 2008
- Born: Betty Gleadle; 11 December 1921; Crosby, Lincolnshire, England
- Died: 24 December 2016 (aged 95); Worthing, West Sussex, England
- Occupation: Actress
- Years active: 1969–2013
- Spouse: Jack Thomas (m. 1945; div. 1959)
- Children: 2

Betty Gleadle (11 December 1921 – 24 December 2016), known by the stage name Liz Smith, was an English actress. She was known for her roles in BBC sitcoms, including as Annie Brandon in I Didn't Know You Cared (1975–1979), the sisters Bette and Belle in 2point4 Children (1991–1999), Letitia Cropley in The Vicar of Dibley (1994–1996) and Norma ("Nana") in The Royle Family (1998–2006). For the latter, Smith was nominated for the BAFTA Award for Best Comedy Performance in 2007. She also played Zillah in Lark Rise to Candleford (2008) and won the BAFTA Award for Best Actress in a Supporting Role for her portrayal of Mother in the film A Private Function (1984).

== Early life ==
Smith was born Betty Gleadle on 11 December 1921 in the Crosby area of Scunthorpe, Lincolnshire. Her mother died when she was two; her father remarried, but his new wife did not wish him to have any contact with his previous life. As a result, Smith was brought up by her widowed grandmother and attended Crosby Junior School and the Scunthorpe Modern and Day Commercial Schools in Cole Street. During the Second World War, Smith served in the Women's Royal Naval Service of the Royal Navy.

== Career ==
=== Early roles ===
In 1971, aged 49, Smith had a career breakthrough when she appeared as the downtrodden mother in Mike Leigh's film Bleak Moments:

The moment that my life transformed was when I was standing in Hamleys one Christmas, flogging toys and I got a message from this young director named Mike Leigh. I was nearly 50 at the time, but he wanted a middle-aged woman to do improvisations. I went to an audition and I got the job of the mother in this improvised film – Bleak Moments, his first film – and it changed my life.

Smith starred in It's a Lovely Day Tomorrow, written by Bernard Kops and directed by John Goldschmidt, which depicted the real-life drama of the Bethnal Green Tube Disaster during World War II. A role in Hard Labour followed. After that, Smith appeared in Emmerdale Farm (as Hilda Semple), Last of the Summer Wine, Bootsie and Snudge, Crown Court, I Didn't Know You Cared and The Sweeney. She also appeared as Madame Balls in The Pink Panther Strikes Again (1976), but her scenes were deleted and remained unseen until Trail of the Pink Panther in 1982. Smith was seen in Curse of the Pink Panther (1983), and later Son of the Pink Panther (1993) in the same role.

In the 1970s and 1980s, Smith appeared in many UK television programmes, including The Duchess of Duke Street, Within These Walls, In Loving Memory, The Gentle Touch, Agatha Christie's Partners in Crime, The Life and Loves of a She-Devil, One by One as Gran Turner and The Lenny Henry Show. In 1984, Smith received a BAFTA Award for Best Supporting Actress for her role as the mother of Maggie Smith's character in A Private Function.

In 1980, Smith won a role in Sir Henry at Rawlinson End as Lady Philippa of Staines. She later appeared in the thriller, Apartment Zero, which was featured in the 1988 Sundance Film Festival. Smith played the role of one of two eccentric characters (the other is Dora Bryan) described by The Washington Post as two "... tea-and-crumpet gargoyle-featured spinsters who snoop the corridors." also had a part in Lovejoy 1eps

=== 1990s ===
Smith started the 1990s by appearing in 2point4 Children (as "Aunt Belle" and "Bette"), Bottom, The Young Indiana Jones Chronicles and Lovejoy. In 1994, she played the lead role in the Children's BBC series Pirates.

Smith played parish council member Letitia Cropley in the first series of The Vicar of Dibley. The character died in her seventh episode, the 1996 Easter Special; she later recalled that she only learned that Cropley was to be killed off when the script was delivered to her home by motorcycle courier with a note from Richard Curtis informing her of the death.

In November 1995, Smith made a guest appearance in the BBC1 medical drama series Casualty. In 1996, she had a cameo appearance in the Mike Leigh film Secrets & Lies and in 1998 starred in the TV sitcom The Royle Family. This aired until 2000, but came back for a special episode in 2006 when her character, Nana, died. In the meantime, Smith had appeared in The Queen's Nose and The Bill. In 1999, Smith was featured in A Christmas Carol as Mrs Dilber. She portrayed that same character in the 1984 version and also appeared as Miss Lory in Alice in Wonderland.

=== 2000s and 2010s ===
Smith continued to act until ill-health beset her in 2009, appearing in such TV programmes as Trial & Retribution V and Doctors. In 2001, Smith appeared as herself in Lily Savage's Blankety Blank. Four years later, she played Grandma Georgina in the film Charlie and the Chocolate Factory and provided the voice of Mrs. Mulch in Wallace & Gromit: The Curse of the Were-Rabbit, as well as small roles in Oliver Twist and Keeping Mum.

In 2006, Smith published her autobiography Our Betty, and moved to a retirement home in Hampstead, London, around the same time. The following year, Smith published a series of short stories entitled Jottings: Flights of Fancy and appeared in the Little Man Tate music video "This Must Be Love". On 5 December 2007, she won the Best Television Comedy Actress at the British Comedy Awards for her role in The Royle Family. The 2006 episode "The Queen of Sheba" takes place six years after the events of the previous series and features Nana's declining health and death. It won the Best Sitcom award at the 2007 BAFTAs, and won the Royal Television Society Award for Best Situation Comedy & Comedy Drama.

In 2006, Smith made a cameo appearance in Kenneth Branagh's film The Magic Flute, a version in English of the Mozart opera. However, her role did not require her to sing. Smith portrayed Old Papagena who, later on in the film, magically transforms into Young Papagena (played by soprano Silvia Moi) and marries the birdcatcher Papageno (played by baritone Benjamin Jay Davis).

In 2008, Smith starred in the first series of the period drama Lark Rise to Candleford. That same year, she was a castaway on BBC Radio 4's Desert Island Discs and was in the film City of Ember, which was released in October 2008. In July 2009, Smith was featured in a one-hour BBC Four documentary called Liz Smith's Summer Cruise, where she joined a group of like-minded individuals on a cruise from Croatia to Venice. That same month, having suffered a series of strokes a few months earlier, Smith announced her retirement from acting at age 87. Smith was made a Member of the Order of the British Empire (MBE) in the 2009 New Year Honours.

In 2010, Smith took part in the BBC television programme The Young Ones, in which six celebrities in their 70s and 80s attempted to overcome some of the problems of ageing by harking back to the 1970s.

== Personal life and death ==
In 1945, Smith married Jack Thomas, whom she met while on service in India. They had two children, but divorced in 1959. Smith brought up her son and daughter on her own. She described this as an extremely difficult period in her life, as Smith struggled against financial problems and social disapproval of her status as a divorcee.

Smith died from natural causes on Christmas Eve 2016 at her home in Worthing, West Sussex, aged 95.

=== Tributes ===
Shane Allen, controller of BBC comedy commissioning, said that Smith had "brilliantly captured the grandparent in everyone's family" as Nana in The Royle Family. Mike Leigh said, "She was a complete breath of fresh air... she was not your bog standard middle-aged actress." The final episode of the lockdown edition of The Vicar of Dibley ended with a tribute just before the closing credits reading, "In loving memory of Liz, John, Emma and Roger", paying tribute to Smith and three other deceased Dibley cast members (John Bluthal, Emma Chambers and Roger Lloyd-Pack).

In 2025, Smith appeared on a British postage stamp issued as part of a special set by Royal Mail, which commemorated the series The Vicar of Dibley.

== Filmography ==
Film
Year	Title	Role
1970	Leo the Last	Raving Tenant (uncredited)
1971	Bleak Moments	Pat's Mother
1976	It Shouldn't Happen to a Vet	Mrs. Dodds
1977	The Duellists	Fortune Teller
1977	The Stick Up	Hotel Manageress
1979	Agatha	Flora
1980	Sir Henry at Rawlinson End	Lady Phillipa of Staines
1981	The Monster Club	Villager (uncredited)
1981	The French Lieutenant's Woman	Mrs. Fairley
1982	Britannia Hospital	Maisie
1982	Crystal Gazing	Lady in Pub
1982	Give Us This Day	Landlady
1983	Fanny Hill	Mrs. Jones (uncredited)
1983	Curse of the Pink Panther	Marta Balls
1984	A Private Function	Mother
1987	Little Dorrit	Mrs. Bangham
1988	We Think the World of You	Millie Burney
1988	High Spirits	Lavinia Plunkett
1989	Bert Rigby, You're a Fool	Mrs. Rigby
1989	The Cook, the Thief, His Wife & Her Lover	Grace
1989	Apartment Zero	Mary Louise McKinney
1991	Dakota Road	Joan Road
1993	Son of the Pink Panther	Marta Balls
1993	Piccolo grande amore	Queen Mother
1995	Haunted	Old Gypsy Woman
1996	Secrets & Lies	Cat Owner
1997	Keep the Aspidistra Flying	Mrs. Meakin
1998	Sweet Revenge	Winnie
1998	Anthrakitis (short)	Dolly
1999	Tom's Midnight Garden	Mrs. Willows
1999	Tube Tales	Old Lady (segment: "Horny")
2003	Anna Spud (short)	Gran
2004	Dead Cool	Liz
2005	Charlie and the Chocolate Factory	Grandma Georgina
2005	Wallace & Gromit: The Curse of the Were-Rabbit	Mrs. Mulch (voice)
2005	Oliver Twist	Old Woman
2005	Keeping Mum	Mrs. Parker
2006	The Magic Flute	The Old Papagena
2008	Flick	Ma
2008	City of Ember	Granny Mayfleet

== Television ==
Year	Title	Role	Notes
1973	Last of the Summer Wine	Housekeeper	Series 1, episode 4
1974	Bedtime Stories	Miss Long	Series 1, episode 4
1974	Comedy Playhouse	(unknown role)	Series 15, episode 14
1974	Seven Faces of Woman	Madge	Series 1, episode 4
1974	Village Hall	Mrs. Whalley	Series 1, episode 2
1974	Omnibus	Mrs. Smith	Series 8, episode 3
1974	Bootsie and Snudge	Mrs. Partridge	Series 4, episode 3
1974	No, Honestly	May	Series 1, episode 5
1974	South Riding	Nellie Hughins	Series 1, episodes 1 and 9
1974	Second City Firsts	Mrs. Murphy	Series 3, episode 7
1974	David Copperfield	Mrs. Heep	Miniseries (3 episodes)
1975	The Sweeney	Mrs. Davies	Series 2, episode 5
1975	The Dick Emery Show	(unknown role)	Series 14, episode 5
1975	It's a Lovely Day Tomorrow	Vi Bell	TV film
1975	Emmerdale Farm	Hilda Semple	Episodes 275–278
1975	The Fortune Hunters	Mrs. Eady	TV film
1974–1976	Crown Court	Mrs. Fowkes	Series 3, episode 7
1974–1976	Crown Court	Kitty Ross	Series 4, episodes 15 and 17
1974–1976	Crown Court	Mrs. Flynn	Series 5, episodes 39, 40 and 41
1976	The Hunchback of Notre Dame	La Falourdel	TV film
1977	The Punch Review	Various	Series 1, episode 2
1977	Nicholas Nickleby	Peg Sliderskew	Miniseries (2 episodes)
1977	Ripping Yarns	Mrs. Bag	Series 1, episode 2
1977	The Duchess of Duke Street	Nanny	Series 2, episodes 4 and 12
1978	Within These Walls	Tottie Dodd	Series 5, episodes 12 and 13
1975–1979	I Didn't Know You Cared	Annie Brandon	Series 1–4 (series regular, 27 episodes)
1979	Hazell	Mrs. Scropp	Series 2, episode 12
1973–1980	Play for Today	Mrs. Thornley	Series 3, episode 20
1973–1980	Play for Today	Mrs. Matthews	Series 4, episode 3
1973–1980	Play for Today	Series 5, episode 5	
1973–1980	Play for Today	Mrs. Pritchett	Series 5, episode 10
1973–1980	Play for Today	Mrs. Oxfam	Series 6, episode 5
1973–1980	Play for Today	Keith's Granny	Series 7, episode 12
1973–1980	Play for Today	Elfie	Series 10, episode 15
1980	Bernie	(unknown role)	Series 2, episode 3
1980	The Russ Abbot Madhouse	Various	Series 1 (7 episodes)
1981	The Other 'Arf	Nora	Series 2, episode 4
1981	Love Story: A Chance to Sit Down	Mrs. Barker	Series 1, episode 3
1980–1982	In Loving Memory	Hilda Pardoe	Series 2, episode 1 and series 3, episode 8
1982	The Gentle Touch	Edna Slater	Series 3, episode 10
1982	Russian Night... 1941	Frosya	TV film
1983	Mr. Right	Gran	Series 1, episodes 1–4
1983	Separate Tables	Miss Meacham	TV film
1983	The All Electric Amusement Arcade	Gran	Series 1 (series regular, 7 episodes)
1983	Agatha Christie's Partners in Crime	Hannah Macpherson	Miniseries (1 episode)
1983–1984	Now and Then	Gran	Series 1 and 2 (series regular, 13 episodes)
1984	One by One	Gran Turner	Series 1 (series regular, 10 episodes)
1984	The Lenny Henry Show	Various	Series 1, episode 2
1984	A Christmas Carol	Mrs. Dilber	TV film
1985	Doctors' Dilemmas	Edna Bryant	Series 2, episode 5
1985	Mann's Best Friends	Mrs. Anstruther	Series regular. In 5 episodes.
1985	Rainbow	Auntie Liz	Series 14, episode 40
1986	Harem	Mrs. Pendleton	TV film
1986	King and Castle	Mrs. Chalmers	Series 1, episode 4
1986	The Life and Loves of a She-Devil	Mrs. Fisher	Miniseries (3 episodes)
1987	Imaginary Friends	Milly Munger	Miniseries (3 episodes)
1987	Worlds Beyond	Mrs. Watts	Series 1, episode 10
1987	Bust	Brenda Walsh	Series 1, episode 5
1987	When We Are Married	Mrs. Northrop	TV film
1987–1988	Valentine Park	Mrs. Giles	Series 1 and 2 (series regular, 12 episodes)
1988	All in Good Faith	Annie Freeman	Series 3, episode 2
1988	Jake's Journey	Witch	TV pilot
1989	Young Charlie Chaplin	Mrs. Greenwood	Series 1, episode 4
1989	Singles	Mrs. Phelps	Series 2, episode 6
1989	All Change	Aunt Mary	Series 1, episode 5
1987–1990	Screen Two	Mrs. Slatterthwaite	Series 3, episode 13
1987–1990	Screen Two	Gran	Series 5, episode 4
1987–1990	Screen Two	Agent	Series 6, episode 3
1990	A Bit of Fry & Laurie	Woman Returning Suits	Series 2, episode 4
1990	Dunrulin	Mrs. Trodd	TV film
1990–1991	Making Out	Muriel	Series 2, episode 4 and series 3, episode 6
1991	El C.I.D.	Mildred	Series 2, episode 4
1991	Bottom	Gypsy Slag Wagon	Series 1, episode 4
1991	Performance	Anyula	Series 1, episode 3
1992	The Young Indiana Jones Chronicles	Delfina	Series 2, episode 4
1993	Lovejoy	Florence	Series 4, episode 8
1993	Cluedo	Mrs. Blanche White	Series 4 (series regular, 6 episodes)
1993	Without Walls	Maid	1 episode
1994	New Voices	Nana	1 episode
1994	Takin' Over the Asylum	Harriet	Miniseries (1 episode)
1994	Screen One	Mrs. Thompson	Series 6, episode 7
1995	Crapston Villas	Delia (voice)	20 episodes
1995	Casualty	Tillie	Series 10, Episode 9
1994–1997	Pirates	Abigail Blood	Series 1–3 (24 episodes)
1994–1996	The Vicar of Dibley	Letitia Cropley	Series 1 (series regular, 6 episodes)
1994–1996	The Vicar of Dibley	Letitia Cropley	Easter special (final episode)
1996	Karaoke	Mrs. Baglin	Miniseries (3 episodes)
1998	V.I.P.	Gossip Columnist	Series 1, episode 1
1998	The Canterbury Tales	The Hag	Series 1, episode 1
1991–1999	2Point4Children	Bette	Series 1–8 (recurring, 11 episodes)
1991–1999	2Point4Children	Aunt Belle	Series 3, episode 1 and series 6, episode 3
1996–1999	The Queen's Nose	Grandma	Series 2 and 3 (7 episodes)
1999	Alice in Wonderland	Miss Lory	TV film
1999	The Ruth Rendell Mysteries	Lena Finn	Series 11, episodes 8 and 9
1999	A Christmas Carol	Mrs. Dilber	TV film
1999	Oliver Twist	Sally	Miniseries (2 episodes)
2000	City Central	Megan Roberts	Series 3, episode 2
2000	Donovan Quick	Granny	TV film
2000	A Christmas Carol	Joyce	TV film
2001	The Life and Adventures of Nicholas Nickleby	Peg Sliderskew	TV film
2002	Animated Tales of the World	Third Aunt	Series 2, episode 12
2002	Trial & Retribution	Mrs. Dorothy Norton	Series 5, episodes 1 and 2
1984–2002	The Bill	Maggie	Series 1, episode 6
1984–2002	The Bill	Mrs. West	Series 7, episode 30
1984–2002	The Bill	Edna Finch	Series 14, episode 78
1984–2002	The Bill	Harriet 'Tatsie' Wright	Series 18, episodes 51 and 52
2003	Doctors	Agatha Clifford	Series 5, episode 142
2003	Between the Sheets	Audrey Delany	Series 1 (series regular, 6 episodes)
2004	Nero	Soothsayer	TV film
1998–2006	The Royle Family	Norma Speakman (Nana)	Series 1–3 (recurring, 10 episodes)
1998–2006	The Royle Family	Norma Speakman (Nana)	2006 special
2007	The Abbey	Elsie	TV pilot
2008	Lark Rise to Candleford	Zillah	Series 1 (series regular, 10 episodes)
2009	The Antiques Rogue Show	Olive Greenhalgh	TV film
2009	The All Star Impressions Show	Queen Elizabeth II	TV special
2013	Common Ground	Colin's Mum	Series 1, episode 7
2013	The Tunnel	Harriet Stone	Series 1, episodes 2 and 3
