= Joseph Kaiser (tenor) =

Canadian opera singer

- Born: 14 October 1977 (age 48); Montreal, Quebec, Canada
- Occupation: Operatic tenor
- Years active: 2005–2019

Joseph Kaiser (born 14 October 1977 in Montreal) is a Canadian operatic tenor and theatre actor, known for appearing in Kenneth Branagh's English-language film version of The Magic Flute.

== Career ==
In 2005, Kaiser won second prize in Plácido Domingo's Operalia International Opera Competition while competing as a baritone. The judges were keen to his talents and potential as a tenor, and proposed that he make the switch to tenor. He has performed as a soloist with the New York Metropolitan Opera, making his debut in October 2007 as Roméo in Gounod's Roméo et Juliette. In November, he returned to the Met to sing the role of Tamino in Mozart's Die Zauberflöte.

In 2006, he played the role of Tamino in Kenneth Branagh's English-language film version of The Magic Flute. The film has been released in Europe, but not in the U.S.

Kaiser was also an anthem singer at the Bell Centre in Montreal, Quebec and Madison Square Garden in New York.

On 4 September 2019, he withdrew from upcoming performances and announced "an indefinite leave of absence" from his singing career.

== Filmography ==
=== Film ===
Year	Title	Role	Notes
2002	Orbiting Pluto	Opera Singer (Bad Date)	Short film
2006	The Magic Flute	Tamino	

=== Television ===
Year	Title	Role	Notes
2007	Eugene Onegin	Lensky	Metropolitan Opera television film
2008	Salome	Narraboth	Metropolitan Opera television film
2009	Theodora	Septimius	Metropolitan Opera television film
2008 2011 2017	Great Performances at the Met	Various	
