= Artesia Water Tower =

Water tower in California

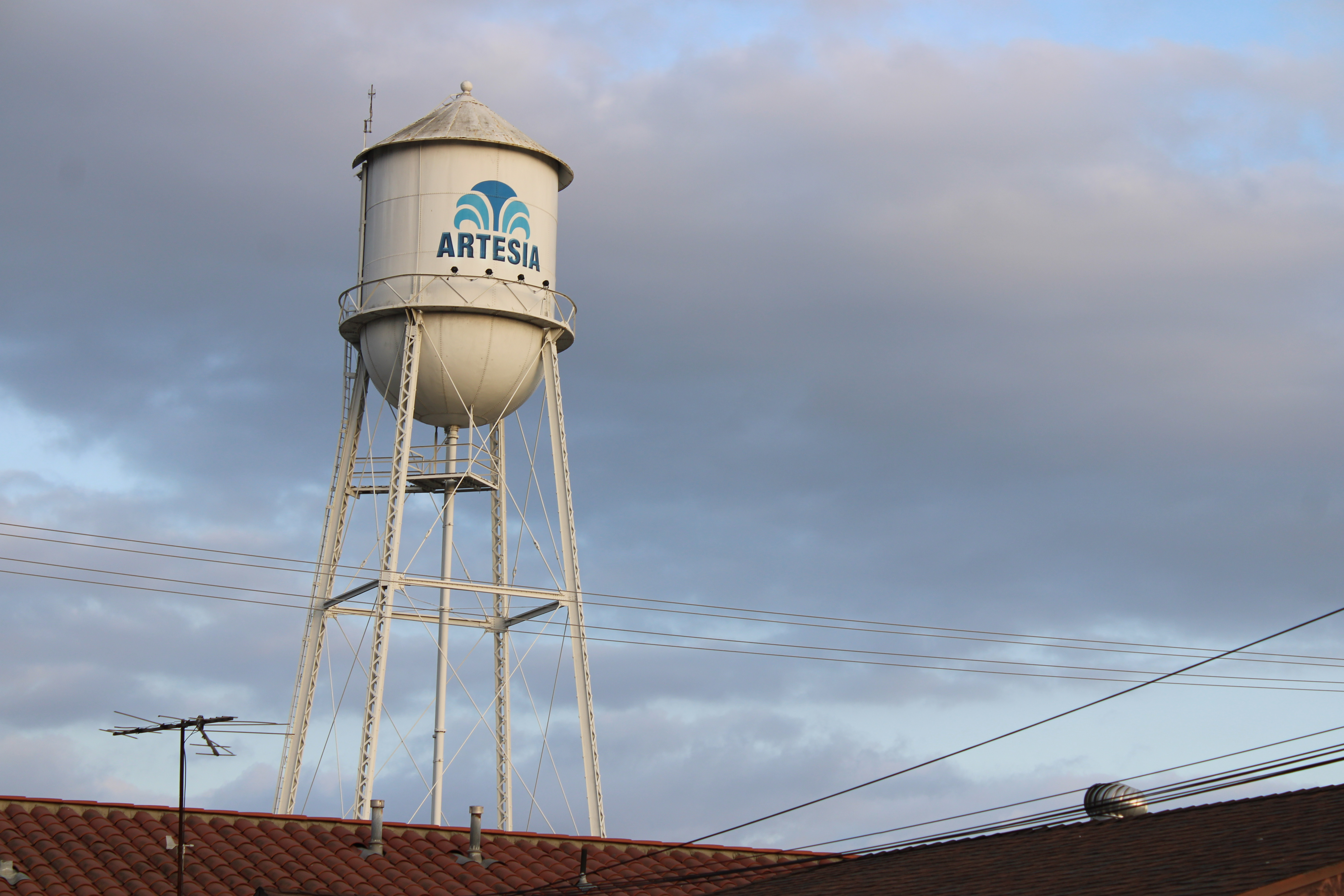
- The water tower in 2025

- Location within the Los Angeles metropolitan area Location within California Location within the United States
- 33.8651°N 118.0793°W
- Type: Water tower
- Location: 18315 Seine Ave, Artesia, CA 90701

Site notes
- Governing body: City of Artesia

The Artesia Water Tower is a water tower in Artesia, California. It is one of the main landmarks in the city and can hold 50,000 US gal (190,000 L), although it is inactive. Not much is known about the tower's history.

The city is aiming to have the tower declared as a historical landmark. It appeared in the film Freddy's Dead: The Final Nightmare and the sitcom My Name Is Earl.

== History ==
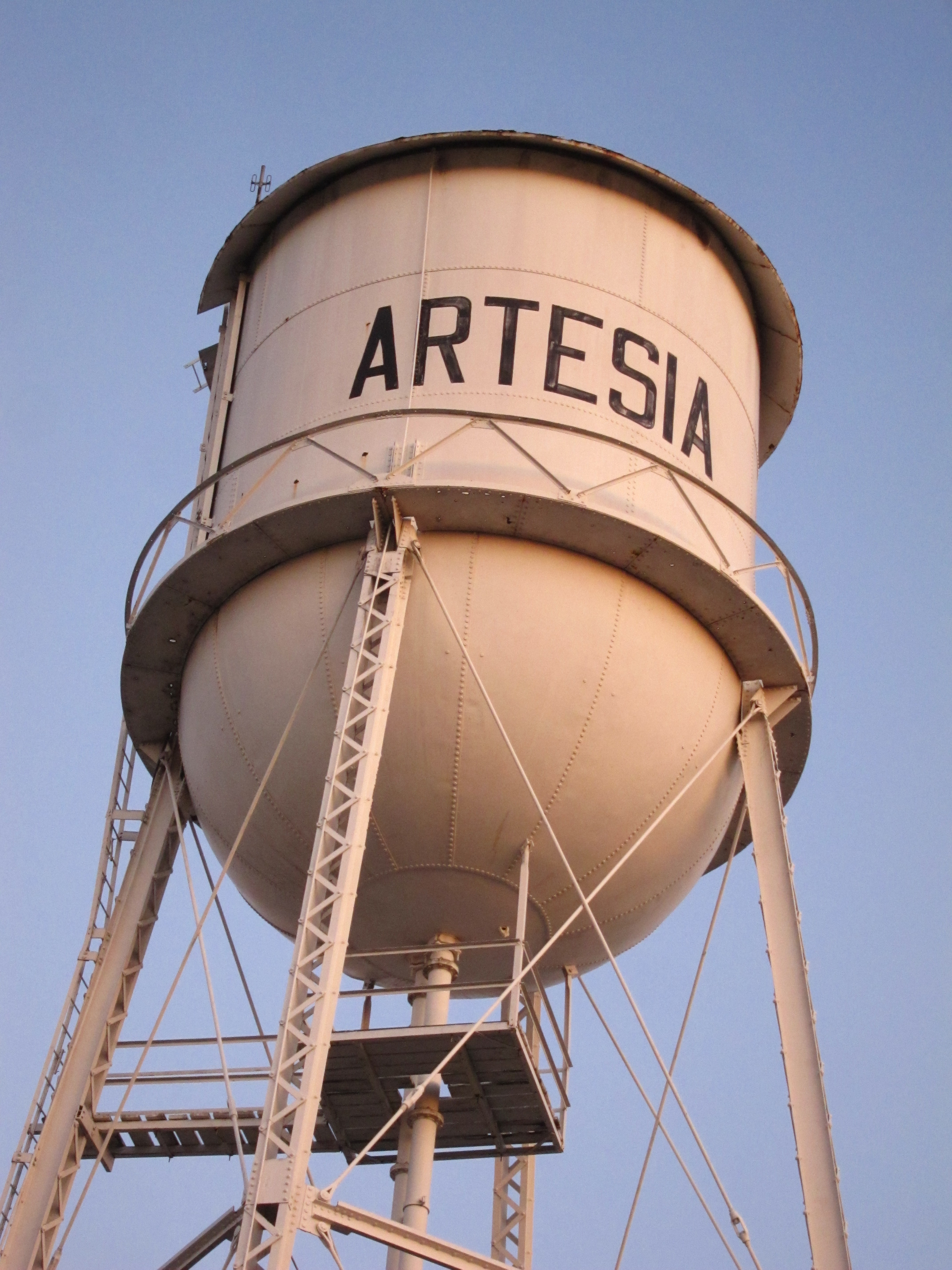
The water tower in 2010, before the repainting

The city of Artesia was named for the artesian wells found in the area, which were helpful for agriculture. A well that existed in 1911 served as the site where the tower was built. No records have been found about the structure's early history, except that it may have previously been a smaller wooden water tower. In 1928, the Southern California Water Company purchased the tower for $17,000; they owned the tower until 1988, when the city acquired the tower to serve as a point of historical interest. When under the operation of the Southern California Water Company, it was painted green, but it was quickly changed to white following the purchase. The name Artesia was painted on both sides as well.

The city contacted AQX Engineering to perform a structural assessment of the tower in 2013. The company developed a digital model and found that the columns and beams on the lower part of the structure would have to be strengthened due to corrosion. Further analysis by Harper and Associates Engineering and Public Works Director Chuck Burkhardt revealed more issues. By 2017, the water tower's paint had declined and its disrepair was able to be seen from the ground, so the city had to have South Coast Painting repaint it. A new logo design also debuted on the sides of the tower during the painting.
