= The Magic Flute (2006 film) =

2006 musical fantasy film

- Spanish release poster
- Directed by: Kenneth Branagh
- Written by: Stephen Fry (English libretto and dialogue)
- Screenplay by: Kenneth Branagh
- Based on: Die Zauberflöte by Emanuel Schikaneder
- Produced by: Pierre-Olivier Bardet; Simon Moseley
- Starring: Joseph Kaiser; Benjamin Jay Davis; Amy Carson; Lyubov Petrova; Silvia Moi; René Pape
- Cinematography: Roger Lanser
- Edited by: Michael Parker
- Music by: Chamber Orchestra of Europe conducted by James Conlon (orig. Wolfgang Amadeus Mozart)
- Production companies: Idéale Audience; Peter Moores Foundation
- Distributed by: Revolver Entertainment; Les Films du Losange
- Release dates: 7 September 2006 (Toronto); 13 December 2006 (France); 30 November 2007 (United Kingdom)
- Running time: 133 minutes
- Countries: United Kingdom; France
- Language: English
- Budget: $27 million
- Box office: $2 million

The Magic Flute is a 2006 romantic fantasy film directed by Kenneth Branagh, adapted from Wolfgang Amadeus Mozart's singspiel Die Zauberflöte. An international co-production between France and the United Kingdom, it was produced by Idéale Audience and in association with UK's Peter Moores Foundation.

== Interpretation ==
As part of the 250th anniversary celebration of Mozart's birthday, a new film version of The Magic Flute, set during World War I, was made, directed by Kenneth Branagh, with a translation by Stephen Fry. The film was presented at the Toronto International Film Festival on 7 September 2006, at the Venice Film Festival on 8 September of that year, and released in Switzerland on 5 April 2007.

The film, with a soundtrack performed by the Chamber Orchestra of Europe conducted by James Conlon, is the first motion picture version of the opera specifically intended for cinemas. Ingmar Bergman's 1975 film version was made for Swedish television and only later released to theatres. Branagh's version was shot in Super 35 and released in anamorphic widescreen, while Bergman's was filmed in Academy ratio for television sets of the 1970s. The story, which has been updated to a World War I setting, follows the structure of the original opera libretto. Tamino is sent by the Queen of the Night to rescue her daughter Pamina after Sarastro has apparently kidnapped her. His sidekick is Papageno, a man who uses underground pigeons to check for poison gas. Sarastro, in charge of a field hospital, is Pamina's father.

A DVD of the film was released in France in August 2007 with a bonus soundtrack CD (lasting around 79 minutes) and a "Making of" featurette (50 minutes). The film has also been released on DVD in the Netherlands (in a three-disc set), Finland, Argentina, and Japan.

Revolver Entertainment gave the film a theatrical release in the United States in June 2013, seven years after its premiere in Europe.

== Cast ==
Branagh consulted with Conlon over casting choices. René Pape, who portrayed Sarastro in several stage productions, is the best-known singer among the ensemble.

- Joseph Kaiser as Tamino
- Benjamin Jay Davis as Papageno
- Amy Carson as Pamina
- René Pape as Sarastro
- Lyubov Petrova as Queen of the Night
- Tom Randle as Monostatos
- Silvia Moi as Papagena
- Liz Smith as Old Papagena
- Teuta Koco, Louise Callinan, Kim-Marie Woodhouse as The Three Ladies
- William Dutton, Luke Lampard and Jamie Manton as The Three Boys

== Release ==
The film was made on an estimated budget of $27 million. On 11 June 2013, seven years after its premiere, the film was finally released on a Region 1 DVD in the United States.

=== Critical reception ===
Variety's Derek Elley gave the film a mixed review. Total Film mistakenly blamed Mozart for the "silliness of the story".

In 2009, three years after the release of the film, Roger Lanser received a Cinematographer of the Year Award from the Australian Cinematographers Society for his work on The Magic Flute.
