= Pirates (TV series) =

- Genre: Children's; Comedy
- Written by: Rebecca Stevens; Peter Tabern; Matthew Tabern; Dave Freedman; Alan Gilbey; Michael Malaghan
- Directed by: Peter Tabern
- Starring: Liz Smith; Paul Bown; Andrew Sachs; Hayley Elliott; Benjamin Rennis; Rebecca Stevens; Toby Sedgwick
- Theme music composer: Jonathan Cohen
- Composer: Jonathan Cohen
- Country of origin: United Kingdom
- Original language: English
- No. of series: 3
- No. of episodes: 24

Production
- Executive producers: Albert Barber; Jeremy Swan
- Producer: Peter Tabern
- Running time: 25 minutes
- Production company: Childsplay Productions

Original release
- Network: BBC One; CBBC
- Release: 6 October 1994 – 26 August 1997

Pirates is a British children's television sitcom. Produced by Childsplay Productions for the BBC, it ran for three series broadcast by Children's BBC between 1994 and 1997, and has not been repeated or commercially released since. The series revolves around a family of pirates whose ship runs aground in North London, prompting them to take up residence in a council house on Wordsworth Terrace, a nearby street.

== Characters ==
Cast

=== Main ===
- Hayley Elliott as Lambkin Bones, Roger's daughter. She is a fun-loving sassy tomboy who has a secret underneath her tough exterior – she doesn't like the sea.
- Paul Bown as Roger Bones. A single father who is the patriarch of the family. He has a slightly sarcastic personality, and cannot co-ordinate things to achieve what he wants.
- Liz Smith as Gran (Abigail Blood), Roger's eccentric mother-in-law. Considering herself "a pirate and a half", she is a dab hand with a blunderbuss, and isn't afraid to fight hard. As the family's cook, her speciality is "mince pies made of squirmy things".
- Benjamin Rennis as Lawrence Kitten, a preteen streetwise boy who lives next door to the Bones family. Although he is often bemused by the family's antics, he and Lambkin are good friends.
- Rebecca Stevens as Grog Blossom Kate, one of Gran's old pirate crew from many years ago, who joins the Bones family when Gran herself invites her for a get-together. She sometimes clashes with Roger, who does not get on very well with her.

=== Minor characters ===
- Pustule the Macaw, Gran's pet macaw.
- Toby Sedgwick (Series 1), Paul Fillipak (Series 2) as The Man in the Sack (Series 1), is a member of the Bones family whose identity is unknown, as his whole body is obscured by a sack.
- Buffy Davis as Mollie Blood, Roger's ex-wife and Abigail's daughter whom is also a pirate and is known for her formidable reputation.
- Andrew Sachs as Mr. Neville Jones, Kittens' other next door neighbour, who leads a secret double life as the pirate Basmati Bill.
- June Brown (Series 1), Jill Meers (Series 2-3) as Mrs. Mildred Jones, wife of Neville.
- Debby Bishop as Helen Kitten, neighbour and mother of Lawrence.
- Helen Lederer as Jill Crutchworthy, a local health care worker, who is frequently on call at the Bones household.
- Charlotte Coleman (Series 1), Claudie Blakley (Series 3) as Gail Fleshy, a pirate and adversary of the Bones family, who often tries to cause havoc.
- Baby Bones, The youngest member of the Bones family, who is never seen, but his presence is often noted by a green glow coming out of his black pram

== Episodes ==
=== Series 1 (1994) ===
No. overall	No. in series	Title	Original release date
1	1	"A Wordsworth Welcome"	6 October 1994
Life will never be the same again in Wordsworth Terrace when Lawrence Kitten wakes up to find that a real pirate family has moved in next door to him.
2	2	"First Day at School"	13 October 1994
Lambkin's first day at school gets her into trouble with the school thugs. Luckily, said thugs haven't counted upon what pirates keep in their school bags.
3	3	"The Health Visitor"	20 October 1994
A fate worse than death lies in store for the Bones family when Jill Crutchworthy the Health Visitor arrives to weigh Baby Bones. To add to that, she has to contend with the family's dog and an aerobically challenged Gran.
4	4	"The Black Spot"	27 October 1994
On the eve of Gran's 84th birthday, she has a nightmare that Blind Pew is trying to give her the Black Spot.
5	5	"Meet Molly"	3 November 1994
Gran has an encounter with Roger's fearsome ex-wife, and her daughter, Molly Blood, and a piratical style custody battle ensues. Fortunately, Lambkin has the last say.
6	6	"Merry Christmas Pirates"	22 December 1994
Christmas is approaching, and the Bones family are getting into the festive spirit – that is, except for Gran, who bricks up the chimney to stop Santa from getting in.

=== Series 2 (1995) ===
No. overall	No. in series	Title	Original release date
7	1	"Leader of the Gran"	4 October 1995
Gran wants to gather together her old gang of pirates from many years ago, but Roger is determined not to let one of them, Grog Blossom Kate, onto the premises.
8	2	"Face to Face"	11 October 1995
Lawrence's mum comes face to face with Molly Blood, who has made a surprise return. At the same time, Gran overhears a plan to throw her onto the scrap heap, and Roger discovers that he has three wishes.
9	3	"Penpal in the Sack"	18 October 1995
A reluctant Roger is persuaded by Gran to impersonate the Man in the Sack when the bag dweller's penpal is expected to visit Wordsworth Terrace – unaware that said penpal looks just like the Man in the Sack.
10	4	"Looking After Baby"	25 October 1995
While Gran is away in America, Roger is asked to look after Baby Bones for her. But when he won't stop crying, Roger is forced to call Jill Crutchworthy the Health Visitor again.
11	5	"Gran's Back!"	1 November 1995
Continuing on from the last episode, Gran returns from America with Lambkin's Cajun cousin, Floozie le Touzel, a girl whom Gran says has a mysterious condition. But Lambkin is convinced the two of them are up to something.
12	6	"The Sinister Visitor"	8 November 1995
Gran reveals that she can foresee the future by reading anybody's feet – and she also reveals that the evil Gladiolus Thripp will arrive, forcing Molly Blood into hiding.

=== Series 3 (1997) ===
No. overall	No. in series	Title	Original release date
13	1	"Garden of the Year"	18 March 1997
Roger makes plans to win the Garden of the Year contest, and show his family what he's really made of.
14	2	"Lowkin"	25 March 1997
Lambkin wakes up one morning suffering from low self-esteem. At the same time, Roger finds out that he has been made a member of Mr. Jones' golf club, unaware that it's a front for Basmati Bill's pirate crew.
15	3	"Granny Day Care"	1 April 1997
To prove himself as a worthy member of the Bones family, Roger attempts to put Gran in a care home.
16	4	"School Daze"	8 April 1997
Two headteachers assess Baby Bones for a placement in Wordsworth Infant School – with guidance by Roger and Molly Blood – but it looks like Roger is also in need of some schooling.
17	5	"Best Served Poorly"	15 April 1997
In a revenge act for Roger's attempt to put her in a care home, Gran takes all of the Bones family's gold, leaving them impoverished.
18	6	"It Takes a Conman..."	22 April 1997
Reports of a ruthless conman in Wordsworth Terrace put each and every member of the Bones family on their guard.
19	7	"Long Gone Silver: Part 1"	29 April 1997
A pirate who goes by the name of Long Gong Silver visits Wordsworth Terrace, but when he breaks his leg in an "accident", it disrupts Roger and Molly's plans, and he has to stay.
20	8	"Long Gone Silver: Part 2"	6 May 1997
Whilst Lone Gone Silver is under the Bones family's care, Grog Blossom Kate is taken in by Silver's charm and wants to learn his ways of making fortunes. At the same time, Roger becomes determined to win a pumpkin growing competition.
21	9	"Gail Warning"	5 August 1997
A fellow pirate who goes by the name of Gail Fleshy arrives in Wordsworth Terrace. At the same time, Grog Blossom Kate is conned into parting with the Bones family's possessions. Could the two events be connected?
22	10	"Supermarket Sneak"	12 August 1997
Roger finds that he has been offered to represent Wordsworth Terrace in a fund-raising trolley dash. He tries to get out of it, but since it would mean he would finally get recognition, he agrees.
21	11	"The Duel"	19 August 1997
Roger feels left out when Mrs. Kitten is offered to work for Sir Richard Vane. And to make matters worse, he is challenged to a duel by Long Gone Silver.
22	12	"Farewell Wordsworth"	26 August 1997
The bailiffs remove Roger's possessions when he loses the Bones family's fortune, and Gran is left with no choice but to move the family out of Wordsworth Terrace.
