= Other People's Lives Are Not as Perfect as They Seem =

Other People's Lives Are Not As Perfect As They Seem

Studio album by Cord
- Released: 2 October 2006
- Recorded: 2006
- Studio: Various: Olympic Studios; (London, England); Sarm West Studios; (London, England); Real World Studios; (Bath, England)
- Genre: Alternative rock
- Length: 43:38
- Label: Island
- Producers: Danton Supple; Youth

Cord chronology
Other People's Lives Are Not As Perfect As They Seem (2006)	Later Is Better For Me, If That's Okay (2011)

Other People's Lives Are Not as Perfect as They Seem is the debut studio album by English rock band Cord. It was released on 2 October 2006 by Island Records.

== Critical reception ==
Professional ratings
Review scores
Source	Rating
The Guardian	1/5 stars
Melodic	4/5 stars

Jim Butler from The Guardian disliked the album; "Deploying a similar sonic pomposity to Matt Bellamy's troupe (Muse), Other People's Lives is a resolutely leaden and dispiriting listen."

== Track listing ==
1. "Go Either Way" - 3:15
2. "Sea of Trouble" - 3:51
3. "Eyes" - 3:54
4. "Winter" - 4:03
5. "Give Me Today" - 3:45
6. "Already Lost" - 6:47
7. "The Best Days of Our Lives" - 4:18
8. "Stay With Me Now" - 4:26
9. "Why I Want It" - 3:39
10. "The Greater Part" - 5:40
