= Ben Davis (singer) =

American actor and singer (born 1975)

- Born: Benjamin Jay Davis; Ames, Iowa, U.S.
- Occupations: Actor; singer
- Years active: 1997–present

Benjamin Jay Davis (born July 15, 1975) is an American singer and actor. He is known for his roles in musical theatre and opera on Broadway, including La bohème, for which he was honored with a Tony Award.

== Life and career ==
Davis was born in Ames, Iowa, and raised in Indianapolis, Indiana, the older of two sons; his mother was a real estate agent.

His first professional production was the US national tour of Les Misérables in 1997. He later appeared in US tours of the musicals Spamalot and The Sound of Music. He has appeared on Broadway in musicals such as Les Misérables, Thoroughly Modern Millie, A Little Night Music, Violet, Dear Evan Hansen, Once Upon A Mattress, Ragtime and Hadestown. He has also starred in off-Broadway and regional productions, including several at The Muny. For his performance as Marcello in the Baz Luhrmann Broadway production of La bohème, he was honored, along with the other members of the principal cast, with a 2003 Tony Award for Excellence in Theatre. He has played Hades, since September 1, 2026, in the Broadway production of Hadestown.

Davis has appeared on television and in films, including starring as Papageno in the film The Magic Flute (2006).

== Filmography ==
Year	Production	Role	Notes
2005	Numb3rs	Air Force Captain	Episode: "Noisy Edge"
2006	The Magic Flute	Papageno	Film
2012	30 Rock	George Treadbury	2 episodes
2014	BBC Proms	Fred Graham	Episode: "Kiss Me, Kate"
2018	Blue Bloods	Lieutenant Jonathan Harvey	Episode: "Authority Figures"
2019-2020	Law & Order: Special Victims Unit	Paul Davies	3 episodes
2021	The Woman in the Window	Steve (voice)	Film
2021	Chicago Fire	Mark Newcomb	Episode: "A White-Knuckle Panic"
2021	Annie Live!	Ensemble	
2022-2023	The Game	Nelson Evans	Recurring role; 4 episodes

== Theatre credits ==
Ref:

Year	Production	Role	Theatre	Notes
1997–2000	Les Misérables	Feuilly / Ensemble u/s Marius Pontmercy u/s Enjolras	US national tour	
2000–2001	Les Misérables	Enjolras	US national tour	
2001–2002	Les Misérables	Enjolras	Imperial Theatre, Broadway	
2002–2003	La Bohème	Marcello	Broadway Theatre, Broadway	
2003	Thoroughly Modern Millie	Mr. Trevor Graydon III	Marquis Theatre, Broadway	
2004	110 in the Shade	File	Pasadena Playhouse	
2004	Mame	Older Patrick	Hollywood Bowl	
2007	Les Misérables	Inspector Javert	Broadhurst Theatre, Broadway	
2008–2009	Spamalot	Sir Dennis Galahad / Prince Herbert's Father / The Black Knight	US national tour	
2010–2011	A Little Night Music	Mr. Lindquist u/s Count Carl-Magnus Malcolm u/s Fredrik Egerman u/s Frid	Walter Kerr Theatre, Broadway	
2011	Show Boat	Gaylord Ravenal	Goodspeed Opera House	
2011	The Boys from Syracuse	Antipholus of Ephesus	Sidney Harman Hall	
2012	The Sound of Music	Captain Georg von Trapp	Studio Tenn Theatre	
2012	The Sound of Music	Captain Georg von Trapp	Paper Mill Playhouse	
2013	Spamalot	Sir Dennis Galahad / Prince Herbert's Father / The Black Knight	The Muny	
2013	South Pacific	Emile de Becque	The Muny	
2013	Show Boat	Gaylord Ravenal	Asolo Repertory Theatre	
2014	Violet	The Preacher / Bus Driver 1 / The Radio Singer / Bus Driver 4	American Airlines Theatre, Broadway	
2014	Kiss Me, Kate	Fred Graham / Petruchio	Royal Albert Hall	Concert
2014	South Pacific	Emile de Becque	Asolo Repertory Theatre	
2015	Shenandoah	Charlie Anderson	Totem Pole Playhouse	
2015	Oklahoma!	Curly McLain	The Muny	
2015–2017	The Sound of Music	Captain Georg von Trapp	US national tour	
2016	South Pacific	Emile de Becque	Benedum Center	
2017	Jesus Christ Superstar	Pontius Pilate	The Muny	
2018	Kiss Me, Kate	Fred Graham / Petruchio	5th Avenue Theatre	
2018	Dear Evan Hansen	Larry Murphy (standby)	Music Box Theatre, Broadway	
2018	South Pacific	Emile de Becque	Rubicon Theatre	
2019	Call Me Madam	Cosmo Constantine	New York City Center, Off-Broadway	
2019	Lady in the Dark	Randy Curtis	New York City Center, Off-Broadway	
2019	Guys and Dolls	Sky Masterson	The Muny	
2019	1776	John Dickinson	The Muny	
2021	9 to 5	Franklin Hart Jr.	North Carolina Theatre	
2022	Sweeney Todd: The Demon Barber of Fleet Street	Sweeney Todd	The Muny	
2023	New York, New York	Gordon Kendrick	St. James Theatre, Broadway	
2023	Arms and the Man	Major Sergius Saranoff	Theatre Row Building, Off-Broadway	
2024	Once Upon A Mattress	Ensemble	New York City Center, Off-Broadway	
2024	The Little Mermaid	King Triton	The Muny	
2024	Once Upon A Mattress	Ensemble u/s Sir Harry u/s King Sextimus the Silent u/s Wizard	Hudson Theatre, Broadway	
2024–2025	Once Upon A Mattress	Sir Harry	Ahmanson Theatre	
2025–2026	Heathers: The Musical	Big Bud Dean / Bill Sweeney / Coach Ripper	New World Stages, Off-Broadway	
2026	Man of La Mancha	Don Quixote / Miguel de Cervantes	Barn Playhouse, New London, New Hampshire	Concert
2026	Ragtime	The Father	Vivian Beaumont Theatre, Broadway	
2026	Hadestown	Hades	Walter Kerr Theatre, Broadway	
