= Lou Angeli =

American writer/filmmaker

Louis P. "Lou" Angeli (August 11, 1951 – December 14, 2013) was an American writer and film maker.

== Biography ==
Lou Angeli was a Delaware-based multi-media producer, having been involved in filmmaking and television production most of his life. Angeli was also a firefighter, EMT and firefighter instructor whose primary area of expertise was firefighter safety. In 1989, he combined both vocations to specialize in film production and television programming dealing with the emergency services.

Angeli's work has been seen on broadcast programs like ABC's 20/20, Dateline: NBC, Rescue/911, Inferno, and Real-TV. Earlier in his television career, he served as a studio director for Philadelphia's PBS station, a remote director for ESPN, and a documentary cameraman for CNN. As a videojournalist, Angeli had documented two wars and dozens of disasters, including the attack on the World Trade Center on 9/11/01.

As a videographer, Angeli's most notable work is documenting fire-rescue incidents from the 1st Responder's point of view. Riding along with fire departments in the US, Canada, Italy and Sweden, he followed firefighters inside of burning buildings to offer the viewer a unique perspective on life as a firefighter.

On September 11, 2007, he announced start up of production on a new documentary dealing with illness and death among 9/11's emergency responders. In a press interview he noted that "70,000 emergency personnel and support volunteers responded to New York's call for help." He continued, "According to The World Trade Center Medical Monitoring Program , fully 70% of these men and women are ill ... the effects of having worked at Ground Zero." Angeli cited estimates that by the 10th anniversary of the World Trade Center disaster, 1,000 emergency personnel will have died of illness contracted at Ground Zero.

Angeli was active as a disaster responder serving on the Community Emergency Response Team (New Castle County, Delaware) and the Medical Reserve Corps , two disaster response programs borne of the ashes of the World Trade Center.

== Career ==
Lou Angeli got started in the film industry as a dolly grip on the Academy Award-winning film Rocky in 1976. As a Director of Photography, Angeli lensed the CBS documentary, "Plan To Get Out Alive!", which earned the production team an Emmy Award. His directorial debut was the 1997 reality series Beyond The Yellow Tape. Later that year, he directed and photographed the documentary When Sparks Fly. In 2005, Angeli was behind the camera directing the thriller Keson. Lou's career also included that of Editor of the International Fire Photographers Association Journal up to his death and cinematographer on Backdraft.

Angeli's most popular work is the 2005 documentary Answering the Call: Ground Zero's Volunteers. Narrated by Kathleen Turner, the film pays tribute to all of the volunteers who descended upon New York City's Ground Zero after the September 11, 2001 terrorist attacks on the World Trade Center.

Answering The Call: Ground Zero's Volunteers was officially released on September 9, 2006 to commemorate the fifth anniversary of the tragedy. The film was broadcast in China, Spain, Portugal, Poland, France and the UK. The film was also released as a DVD, Streaming Internet Video and Video On Demand in the United States. An updated version of the film was released in August 2011 to commemorate the 10th anniversary of the World Trade Center Disaster. Segments of the updated film aired on CNN , BBC , CBC and RAI .

Lou was also a volunteer firefighter for O'Fallon Fire Protection District, O'Fallon, MO while he lived in the St. Louis, MO metro area and also did extensive news coverage in the St. Louis, MO area during the "Great Flood of 1993" when the Missouri River and Mississippi River came together in the area of Orchard Farm, MO. I had the pleasure of working with him on his coverage. (Roy Poteete, St. Charles Fire Protection District, Retired Firefighter/EMT). A mutual friendship was made till the end of his life. I spoke to him several days before he died.

== World Trade Center Disaster ==
Angeli volunteered "multiple" hours at Ground Zero, working the "Pile", immediately after the 9-11 murders at the World Trade Center.

It is thought that his time at Ground Zero hastened onset of his death.

== Death ==
Angeli was admitted several weeks before his death suffering from a subarachnoid hemorrhage as well as sepsis. He lingered in critical condition until finally succumbing.

Angeli's sickness was reportedly caused by his extensive time spent at Ground Zero. His family says that since he had returned from the World Trade Center site that he would have severe coughing episodes accompanied by sudden bleeding of the airway.

Louis was predeceased by his mother, Mary (Conforti) Angeli. He is survived by his father, Frank Angeli; wife, Patricia Olesky; son, Andrew Angeli; and a host of extended family both in Wilmington and Italy.
