= Answering the Call: Ground Zero's Volunteers =

- DVD Cover: United States and Canada
- Directed by: Lou Angeli
- Written by: Lou Angeli; Bunny Dubin
- Produced by: Bunny Dubin
- Starring: Lisa Brady; Gary Gustin; Andrew Kranz; Tom Leonard
- Narrated by: Kathleen Turner
- Cinematography: Lou Angeli; Corey Armideo
- Edited by: Erin Adams; Lou Angeli
- Music by: Geoff Levin
- Distributed by: Behr Entertainment Ltd.
- Release date: August 26, 2005
- Running time: 87 minutes
- Country: United States
- Language: English

Answering The Call: Ground Zero's Volunteers is a documentary film that pays tribute to the thousands of volunteers who answered New York City's call for help following the September 11 attacks in 2001. The film was directed by Lou Angeli and is narrated by actress Kathleen Turner, both of whom served at Ground Zero as volunteers.

Many personal accounts have risen from the ashes of the World Trade Center Towers, and Answering the Call is a chronicle of the thousands of civilian emergency personnel who responded to the disaster. The documentary includes footage by Lou Angeli, a veteran volunteer firefighter and filmmaker, who himself was part of the rescue effort.

With that first 72 hours as a backdrop, Answering the Call weaves the stories of rescue and support volunteers at Ground Zero as the site develops into an Emergency Village. “We were all a brother and a sister at Ground Zero", one subject recalls.

Angeli was reluctant to make his footage public mainly due to the sensitive nature of this horrific event, and the wounds it inflicted in the hearts of Americans. But at the 2005 American Film Market, other film professionals spoke to him about how this footage could be woven into a worthy story. That story eventually became Answering The Call, a film that pays tribute to the fallen, remembers the heroes, and summons up lessons to be learned. The timing was right and Chesca Media Group, led by Patricia Olesky, made this possible by agreeing to produce the project.

Answering The Call: Ground Zero's Volunteers was officially released on September 9, 2006, to commemorate the fifth anniversary of the tragedy. The film was broadcast in China, Spain, Portugal, Poland, France and the UK, and was released as a DVD, Streaming Internet Video and Video On Demand in the United States. Exclusive distribution for the film is through Walter Behr, Behr Entertainment.

== See also ==
- List of firefighting films
