= What Your Boyfriend Said =

Single by Little Man Tate

from the album Nothing Worth Having Comes Easy
- B-side: "Shark Bite"; "She Bought Shoes"
- Released: 2 June 2008
- Recorded: 2008, 2Fly, Sheffield
- Genre: Indie Rock
- Label: Skint/Yellow Van
- Songwriter(s): Windle/Marriott
- Producer(s): Alan Smythe

Little Man Tate singles chronology
"European Lover" (2007)	"What Your Boyfriend Said" (2008)	"Hey Little Sweetie" (2008)

"What Your Boyfriend Said" was the eighth single to be released by Little Man Tate. It was released on 2 June 2008 and reached #60 in the UK Singles Chart.

== Track listings ==
CD

1. "What Your Boyfriend Said"
2. "Shark Bite"

7", #1

1. "What Your Boyfriend Said"
2. "Shark Bite"

7", #2

1. "What Your Boyfriend Said"
2. "She Bought Shoes"

Download

1. "What Your Boyfriend Said"
