= Man I Hate Your Band =

Single by Little Man Tate

from the album About What You Know
- B-side: "Saved by a Chat Show"; "75"
- Released: 13 November 2006
- Recorded: 2006
- Genre: Indie Rock
- Label: V2, Yellow Van
- Songwriter(s): Windle/Marriott

Little Man Tate singles chronology
"House Party at Boothy's" (2006)	"Man I Hate Your Band" (2006)	"Sexy in Latin" (2007)

"Man I Hate Your Band" was the fourth single to be released by Little Man Tate. It was released on 13 November 2006, following the band's lengthy UK tour and also dates in USA and Japan. It charted at number 26 in the UK Singles Chart on 19 November 2006. The song's title is a parody of the line 'Dude, I love your band' from the D12 song, "My Band".

== Track listings ==
CD

1. "Man I Hate Your Band"
2. "Saved by a Chat Show"

7" yellow vinyl

1. "Man I Hate Your Band"
2. "Saved by a Chat Show"

7" white vinyl

1. "Man I Hate Your Band" (Live At Boothy's)
2. "75"
