= What? What You Got? =

Single by Little Man Tate

from the album About What You Know
- B-side: "Young Offenders"
- Released: 22 May 2006
- Recorded: 2006, Steelworks, Sheffield
- Genre: Indie Rock
- Label: Yellow Van
- Songwriter: Windle/Marriott
- Producer: Shanks

Little Man Tate singles chronology
"The Agent" (2006)	"What? What You Got?" (2006)	"House Party at Boothy's" (2006)

"What? What You Got?" was the second single from Little Man Tate. It entered the UK Singles Chart at number 40. and number one on the UK Indie Chart. The song was first played by Steve Lamacq on BBC 6 Music.

The front cover of the single features an image of Access All Areas pass to the Boardwalk venue in the band's hometown of Sheffield. The music video starred British actress Melissa Leigh.

== Track listing ==
1. "What? What You Got?"
2. "Young Offenders"
