= Little Man Tate (band) =

British indie rock band

- Origin: Sheffield, England
- Genres: Indie rock
- Years active: 2005–2009, 2020–present
- Labels: Yellow Van Records, V2 Records, Skint Records, Yellow Van 2020
- Members: Jon Windle; Edward 'Maz' Marriott; Ben Surtees; Dan Fields
- Website: http://www.littlemantateofficial.co.uk

Little Man Tate are a British four-piece indie rock band from Sheffield, England who formed in 2005. The band quickly began attracting interest from several record labels and in March 2006 signed to V2 Records. Their fifth single, "Sexy in Latin" was released on 22 January 2007 and became their highest-charting single to date. The band parted ways with their label in November 2007 following the acquisition of V2 by Universal Music Group and subsequently signed with Skint Records.

The band made extensive use of the Internet to gather a fanbase. Like many other up and coming bands they made use of MySpace as well as their own forum to communicate with and co-ordinate fans.

They broke up in 2009 and stayed away from the spotlight until early 2020 when they announced they would be reforming for several reunion shows in their hometown of Sheffield.

== History ==
=== Formation ===
Jon Windle and Edward 'Maz' Marriott were in several bands together from the age of 15 in Sheffield, and their first gig together was at St Timothy's Church Hall in Crookes. This was followed up by several other low key gigs in friends bedrooms and garages.

Little Man Tate were originally formed as a 4-piece band by singer/guitarist Jon Windle, guitarist Edward 'Maz' Marriott, drummer Mike Balkow and former lead singer Simon Barnes in 1998 under the name Carousel Moon. The band changed their name to The Moon on 15 October 2001 which remained in place until 2005.

Then came a transitional period for the band as they briefly changed their name to Lazy Eye before finally becoming Little Man Tate in September 2005. The band line up had also changed over the early years, following the departures of original lead singer Simon Barnes, and drummer Mike Balkow, who was replaced by Dan Fields.

In an interview, Jon Windle revealed the name Little Man Tate came when he was on the telephone to bass player Ben Surtees, and was trying to think of a band name. He saw the film Little Man Tate advertised in the television listing, and they settled on that.

=== Touring, V2 and debut album (2005–2007) ===
The band began touring together in September 2005.

Their first single, "The Agent", was released 6 March 2006 on 7" vinyl with "Just Can't Take It" as the B-side. All 1,800 copies sold out as pre-orders. The back of the record sleeve featured 273 usernames of members of the band's forum. The song was rated 9/10 by Teletext's Planet Sound. "The Agent" was Number 6 in Planet Sound's top 50 singles of 2006. The band played acoustic sets at several HMV stores around the UK to promote the single. It reached number 117 in the official UK Singles Chart on sales of the 7" vinyl alone.

In April 2006, the band toured the UK. The band's second single, "What? What You Got?" was released on 22 May 2006, and reached number 40 in the UK Singles Chart, and was first played by DJ Phil Beckett on 96.2 The Revolution and not by Steve Lamacq on BBC 6 Music. Both "The Agent" and "What? What You Got?" were released under the band's own label, Yellow Van Records, a tribute to their old yellow van which was stolen along with all their equipment at an early gig at Fibbers (Barfly) in York.

In June 2006, Little Man Tate played their first festival at the Middlesbrough Music Live in Middlesbrough, UK. In August 2006, they played the Reading and Leeds Festivals on the Carling Stage. On 26 August 2006, the band released their third single "House Party at Boothy's". The track reached number 29 in the official UK Singles Chart The band's fourth single, "Man I Hate Your Band", was released on 13 November 2006. It charted at number 26 in the UK Singles Chart.

On 22 January 2007, the band released their fifth single "Sexy in Latin" one week prior to the release of their debut album. The track became the band's first top 20 single when it charted at number 20 in the UK Singles Chart. The band's debut album, About What You Know was released on 29 January 2007 and reached number 27 in the UK Albums Chart. The next single to be released was "This Must Be Love" on 26 March 2007. The single reached number 33 in the UK Singles Chart. The music video for the track starred veteran British actress Liz Smith.

On 18 July 2007, the band released two new tracks "Suicide Tuesday" and "Trouble With Detox" free on NME.com. The band played the Main Stage of the Reading and Leeds Festivals on 24 & 25 August 2007. The band released their seventh single, "European Lover" on 27 August 2007, a re-recorded version of the same track that featured on their debut album, About What You Know. The single was not chart eligible as the single included a sticker advertising a competition to win tickets for the band's forthcoming Christmas gig in Blackpool at the Empress Ballroom.

It was reported on 11 August 2007 that the band's record label V2 Records had been bought out by Universal. The band were subsequently dropped by V2 in November 2007, along with a large number of the rest of V2's roster of acts. It was during this time that the band announced they would release their eighth single 'Boy in the Anorak' prior to being released by V2. Promotional copies of the single were sent out and the track was made available to purchase temporarily on iTunes, however at the last minute the single was cancelled. The band gave away free copies of the single at a Blackpool Empress Ballroom gig and it was made available to download from their website on Christmas Day.

=== Second album (2008–2009) ===
On 2 June 2008, the band released their eighth single, "What Your Boyfriend Said", which was the first to be taken from their second album Nothing Worth Having Comes Easy. The track reached number 60 in the UK Singles Chart. The band released their ninth single "Hey Little Sweetie" on 8 September 2008. The track reached number 142 in the UK Singles Chart.

On 15 September 2008, the band released their second album, Nothing Worth Having Comes Easy, which reached number 80 in the UK Albums Chart.

In November 2008, a list of BNP members was leaked on the internet which caused a case of mistaken identity when on the list appeared a Jon Windle of Sheffield. The NME verified that it was not Windle of Little Man Tate. The band then released a statement saying "We would like to assure our fans that the Jon Windle that has appeared on the leaked list of BNP members is not the band's vocalist. Jon has never associated himself with the BNP in any form."

Little Man Tate released their tenth single, "I Am Alive", on 23 March 2009 on 7" vinyl and digital download only, and it was the band's final release.

=== Break up ===
On 13 July 2009, Little Man Tate announced their decision to split up after four years. They performed two final sell-out shows at the O2 Academy in Sheffield on 2 and 3 October 2009 to over three thousand people.

=== After Little Man Tate ===
Edward Marriott was a session musician in London, following the band's split. As of March 2010, he toured with singer Jay Brown and Dusso & The Holy Smokes. He is now working as a music teacher in North London. Previously a music teacher in belfairs academy in Leigh-On-Sea

Ben Surtees was DJing and working on Hospital radio

After LMT, Jon Windle released two solo albums, Step Out The Man in October 2010, and Sober Minds in May 2012. He continued to tour, performing both solo acoustic shows as well as full band concerts until December 2013 when he announced his retirement with a sold-out show at Sheffield City Hall on 22 December. Windle is now involved in music management, working with a variety of different bands in the indie and rock genres across the UK, most notably RedFaces who were signed to Sony RCA.

=== Reunion concerts ===
On 9 March 2020 a new Facebook page, apparently set up by the band, appeared under the name LittleManTateOfficial followed by a cryptic post that simply read "Somethings Happening" a reference to one of the band's biggest hits, "Sexy in Latin". Shortly after Twitter and Instagram accounts, also using LittleManTateOfficial surfaced, again appearing to be set up by the band, fuelling speculation in both the local and national music press that they were about to reform. On 24 March 2020, the band released a post across all social media platforms stating that an announcement would be made on 14 April, along with the #somethingshappening moniker.

On 14 April, after nearly five weeks of speculation, the band announced that a one-off reunion show would be taking place at O2 Academy Sheffield on 18 September. On 22 April, following high levels of demand for pre-sale tickets (selling out in less than 45 minutes), the band announced a second date at O2 Academy Sheffield on 19 September 2020.

Due to the COVID-19 outbreak, and the effect on live music as a whole, the band were forced to announce the reunion dates being rescheduled to 16 and 17 April 2021. Further COVID-19 delays led to the shows being rescheduled again to the October 2021. Upon announcement of the further rearrangement, the second night sold out within hours, leading to speculation that a third date might be announced.

On 8 and 9 October, over a year after the originally scheduled dates, Little Man Tate played two sold out nights at the O2 to nearly 4500 people.

=== Boy in the Anorak 2020 ===
On 16 October, the band announced via social media that Boy in the Anorak, the intended and subsequently cancelled 8th single, would finally receive a full release under new label Yellow Van 2020. The single was subsequently released on Friday 23 October on all major streaming platforms - the first time that the single had been made available to the general public having been a limited download over a decade before.

== Discography ==
- About What You Know (2007)
- Nothing Worth Having Comes Easy (2008)
- Welcome to the Rest of Your Life (2023)
