= List of My Name Is Earl episodes =

American sitcom television episodes

My Name Is Earl logo

My Name Is Earl is an American television sitcom created by Greg Garcia for the National Broadcasting Company (NBC). The first season premiered on September 20, 2005. Three additional seasons followed before the series concluded on May 14, 2009, after 96 episodes had aired. The series was unexpectedly cancelled, ending on a cliffhanger. The production company, 20th Century Fox Television, attempted to get the program picked up by other broadcast networks including the American Broadcasting Company (ABC) and the Fox Broadcasting Company. Talks were also at one-time underway with the basic cable network Turner Broadcasting System (TBS) for a 13-episode fifth season; these fell through after it was discovered that the budget would have to be reduced by $1 million per episode, which was seen as unsustainable due to the resultant cuts in cast, writers, and crew.

The series follows the titular character, Earl Hickey (portrayed by Jason Lee), an unemployed petty thief who lives in the fictional Camden County. After he wins the jackpot on a lottery scratcher, Earl celebrates and is struck by a vehicle in a hit-and-run collision. While in the hospital, he discovers the concept of karma and decides to make a list of his bad deeds. He uses his lottery winnings to make up for them by helping the people he wronged. Earl resides in a motel with his brother Randy (Ethan Suplee) who frequently accompanies him on his tasks. They are friends with the housekeeper, Catalina Aruca (Nadine Velazquez), whom Randy also has a crush on. Earl and Randy also regularly interact with Earl's ex-wife and the mother of his son, Joy Turner (Jaime Pressly), as well as her new husband, Darnell (Eddie Steeples), an employee at the local bar. Most episodes follow Earl as he completes an item on his list and are occasionally supplemented with subplots that make up pieces of long-term story arcs.

My Name Is Earl was consistently a strong performer in viewing figures for NBC. The show garnered critical acclaim and was broadcast internationally as well as receiving accolades and award nominations. It takes place in a shared fictional universe with Raising Hope, another sitcom created by Garcia. Within that series, it was suggested that Earl ultimately completed his list. Lee, Suplee, Velazquez, Pressly, and Steeples also appeared in one episode of Raising Hope in new roles that contained references to My Name Is Earl.

== Series overview ==
Series overview for My Name Is Earl
Season	Episodes	Originally released		Average viewership (in millions)
Season	Episodes	First released	Last released	Average viewership (in millions)
1	24	September 20, 2005	May 11, 2006	11.38 (Note: Multiple references; for the first season, see: Episode 1: Episode 2: Episode 3: Episode 4: Episode 5: Episode 6: Episode 7: Episode 8: Episode 9: Episode 10: Episode 11: Episode 12: Episode 13: Episode 14: Episode 15: Episode 16: Episode 17: Episode 18: Episode 19: Episode 20: Episode 21: Episode 22: Episode 23: Episode 24:)
2	23	September 21, 2006	May 10, 2007	8.62 (Note: Multiple references; for the second season, see: Episode 1: Episode 2: Episode 3: Episode 4: Episode 5: Episode 6: Episode 7: Episode 8: Episode 9: Episodes 10 and 11: Episode 12: Episode 13: Episode 14: Episode 15: Episode 16: Episode 17: Episode 18: Episode 19: Episode 20: Episode 21: Episode 22: Episode 23:)
3	22	September 27, 2007	May 15, 2008	7.08 (Note: Multiple references; for the third season, see: Episodes 1 and 2: Episode 3: Episode 4: Episode 5: Episode 6: Episodes 7 and 8: Episode 9: Episode 10: Episode 11: Episode 12: Episode 13: Episodes 14 and 15: Episode 16: Episode 17: Episode 18: Episode 19: Episode 20: Episodes 21 and 22:)
4	27	September 25, 2008	May 14, 2009	6.23 (Note: Multiple references; for the fourth season, see: Episodes 1 and 2: Episodes 3 and 4: Episode 5: Episode 6: Episode 7: Episode 8: Episode 9: Episode 10: Episode 11: Episode 12: Episode 13: Episode 14: Episode 15: Episode 16: Episode 17: Episode 18: Episode 19: Episode 20: Episode 21: Episode 22: Episode 23: Episode 24: Episode 25: Episode 26: Episode 27:)

== Episodes ==
=== Season 1 (2005–06) ===
List of My Name Is Earl season 1 episodes
No. overall	No. in season	Title	Directed by	Written by (Note: In the Writers Guild of America screenwriting credit system, an ampersand (&) is used to denote writers who worked together as a team, while the word "and" refers to writers who worked on the same teleplay independently.)	Original release date	Prod. code	U.S. viewers (millions)
1	1	"Pilot"	Marc Buckland	Greg Garcia	September 20, 2005	1ALJ79	15.25
2	2	"Quit Smoking"	Marc Buckland	Kat Likkel & John Hoberg	September 27, 2005	1ALJ01	11.36
3	3	"Randy's Touchdown"	Marc Buckland	J.B. Cook	October 4, 2005	1ALJ02	13.23
4	4	"Faked My Own Death"	Tamra Davis	Hilary Winston	October 11, 2005	1ALJ05	12.62
5	5	"Teacher Earl"	Chris Koch	Victor Fresco	October 18, 2005	1ALJ04	12.19
6	6	"Broke Joy's Fancy Figurine"	Lev L. Spiro	Danielle Sanchez-Witzel	November 1, 2005	1ALJ03	12.18
7	7	"Stole Beer from a Golfer"	Chris Koch	Michael Pennie	November 8, 2005	1ALJ06	11.57
8	8	"Joy's Wedding"	Marc Buckland	Greg Garcia	November 15, 2005	1ALJ07	11.51
9	9	"Cost Dad the Election"	Chris Koch	Bobby Bowman	November 22, 2005	1ALJ08	12.20
10	10	"White Lie Christmas"	Marc Buckland	Timothy Stack	December 6, 2005	1ALJ09	13.99
11	11	"Barn Burner"	Ken Whittingham	Brad Copeland	January 5, 2006	1ALJ10	11.19
12	12	"O Karma, Where Art Thou?"	Michael Fresco	Barbie Adler	January 12, 2006	1ALJ12	12.49
13	13	"Stole P's HD Cart"	Chris Koch	J.B. Cook	January 19, 2006	1ALJ14	10.78
14	14	"Monkeys in Space"	Marc Buckland	Greg Garcia	January 26, 2006	1ALJ13	10.45
15	15	"Something to Live For"	Marc Buckland	Kat Likkel & John Hoberg	February 2, 2006	1ALJ15	10.60
16	16	"The Professor"	Marc Buckland	Danielle Sanchez-Witzel	February 9, 2006	1ALJ11	10.20
17	17	"Didn't Pay Taxes"	Craig Zisk	Michael Pennie	March 2, 2006	1ALJ16	11.27
18	18	"Dad's Car"	Chris Koch	Brad Copeland & Barbara Feldman	March 16, 2006	1ALJ18	10.59
19	19	"Y2K"	Marc Buckland	Hilary Winston	March 23, 2006	1ALJ19	11.31
20	20	"Boogeyman"	Eyal Gordin	Vali Chandrasekaran	March 30, 2006	1ALJ20	9.90
21	21	"The Bounty Hunter"	Marc Buckland	Hunter Covington	April 6, 2006	1ALJ17	10.21
22	22	"Stole a Badge"	Marc Buckland	Victor Fresco	April 27, 2006	1ALJ22	9.05
23	23	"BB"	Victor Nelli, Jr.	Kat Likkel & John Hoberg	May 4, 2006	1ALJ21	8.80
24	24	"Number One"	Greg Garcia	Greg Garcia	May 11, 2006	1ALJ23	9.35

=== Season 2 (2006–07) ===
List of My Name Is Earl season 2 episodes
No. overall	No. in season	Title	Directed by	Written by	Original release date	Prod. code	U.S. viewers (millions)
25	1	"Very Bad Things"	Marc Buckland	Michael Pennie	September 21, 2006	2ALJ02	8.86
26	2	"Jump for Joy"	Chris Koch	Vali Chandrasekaran	September 28, 2006	2ALJ03	8.12
27	3	"Sticks & Stones"	Marc Buckland	Danielle Sanchez-Witzel	October 5, 2006	2ALJ01	9.89
28	4	"Larceny of a Kitty Cat"	Millicent Shelton	Hilary Winston	October 12, 2006	2ALJ05	9.84
29	5	"Van Hickey"	Craig Zisk	Story by : J.B. Cook & Marc Singer; Teleplay by : J.B. Cook	October 19, 2006	2ALJ04	8.56
30	6	"Made a Lady Think I Was God"	Marc Buckland	Bobby Bowman	November 2, 2006	2ALJ06	9.48
31	7	"Mailbox"	Michael Fresco	Kat Likkel & John Hoberg	November 9, 2006	2ALJ08	9.13
32	8	"Robbed a Stoner Blind"	Marc Buckland	Kat Likkel & John Hoberg	November 16, 2006	2ALJ07	9.12
33	9	"Born a Gamblin' Man"	Chris Koch	Victor Fresco	November 30, 2006	2ALJ10	9.49
34	10	"South of the Border"	Michael Fresco	Michael Pennie	December 7, 2006	2ALJ12	10.04
35	11	"South of the Border"	Marc Buckland	Danielle Sanchez-Witzel	December 7, 2006	2ALJ13	10.04
36	12	"Our 'Cops' Is On"	Ken Whittingham	Timothy Stack	January 4, 2007	2ALJ09	10.03
37	13	"Buried Treasure"	Eyal Gordin	Erika Kaestle & Patrick McCarthy	January 11, 2007	2ALJ11	10.85
38	14	"Kept a Guy Locked in a Truck"	Eyal Gordin	Kat Likkel & John Hoberg	January 18, 2007	2ALJ14	9.77
39	15	"Foreign Exchange Student"	Marc Buckland	Mike Mariano	February 1, 2007	2ALJ15	10.69
40	16	"Blow"	Victor Nelli, Jr.	J.B. Cook	February 8, 2007	2ALJ16	9.53
41	17	"The Birthday Party"	Eyal Gordin	Hilary Winston	February 15, 2007	2ALJ17	9.10
42	18	"Guess Who's Coming Out of Joy"	Mike Fresco	Greg Garcia	February 22, 2007	2ALJ18	8.71
43	19	"Harassed a Reporter"	Chris Koch	Barbie Adler & Brad Copeland	April 12, 2007	2ALJ19	6.67
44	20	"Two Balls, Two Strikes"	Victor Nelli, Jr.	Bobby Bowman	April 19, 2007	2ALJ22	7.15
45	21	"G.E.D."	Michael Fresco	Hunter Covington	April 26, 2007	2ALJ20	7.49
46	22	"Get a Real Job"	Ken Whittingham	Story by : Ralph Greene & Patrick McCarthy & Erika Kaestle; Teleplay by : Patrick McCarthy & Erika Kaestle	May 3, 2007	2ALJ21	7.57
47	23	"The Trial"	Michael Fresco	Timothy Stack, Mike Mariano and Vali Chandrasekaran	May 10, 2007	2ALJ23	6.94

=== Season 3 (2007–08) ===
List of My Name Is Earl season 3 episodes
No. overall	No. in season	Title	Directed by	Written by	Original release date	Prod. code	U.S. viewers (millions)
48	1	"My Name Is Inmate #28301-016"	Michael Fresco	Michael Pennie	September 27, 2007	3ALJ01	8.66
49	2	"My Name Is Inmate #28301-016"	Michael Fresco	Kat Likkel & John Hoberg	September 27, 2007	3ALJ02	8.66
50	3	"The Gangs of Camden County"	Michael Fresco	Victor Fresco	October 4, 2007	3ALJ05	7.98
51	4	"The Frank Factor"	Greg Garcia	Greg Garcia	October 11, 2007	3ALJ04	7.76
52	5	"Creative Writing"	Chris Koch	Bobby Bowman	October 18, 2007	3ALJ03	7.25
53	6	"Frank's Girl"	Eyal Gordin	Danielle Sanchez-Witzel	October 25, 2007	3ALJ06	8.20
54	7	"Our Other 'Cops' Is On!"	Ken Whittingham	Timothy Stack	November 1, 2007	3ALJ08	7.30
55	8	"Our Other 'Cops' Is On!"	Ken Whittingham	Vali Chandrasekaran	November 1, 2007	3ALJ09	7.30
56	9	"Randy in Charge (...Of Our Days and Our Nights)"	Eyal Gordin	Mike Mariano	November 8, 2007	3ALJ10	7.66
57	10	"Midnight Bun"	Eyal Gordin	Hilary Winston	November 15, 2007	3ALJ11	8.01
58	11	"Burn Victim"	Gail Mancuso	Michael Shipley	November 29, 2007	3ALJ12	6.62
59	12	"Early Release"	Jason Ensler	Jessica Goldstein & Chrissy Pietrosh	December 6, 2007	3ALJ13	7.38
60	13	"Bad Earl"	Eyal Gordin	Alan Kirschenbaum	January 10, 2008	3ALJ07	7.74
61	14	"I Won't Die with a Little Help from My Friends"	Marc Buckland	Greg Garcia	April 3, 2008	3ALJ14	7.53
62	15	"I Won't Die with a Little Help from My Friends"	Marc Buckland	Bobby Bowman	April 3, 2008	3ALJ15	7.53
63	16	"Stole a Motorcycle"	Eyal Gordin	Kat Likkel & John Hoberg	April 10, 2008	3ALJ16	7.09
64	17	"No Heads and a Duffel Bag"	Michael Fresco	Hunter Covington	April 17, 2008	3ALJ17	6.87
65	18	"Killerball"	Eyal Gordin	Matt Ward	April 24, 2008	3ALJ18	6.16
66	19	"Love Octagon"	Michael Fresco	Danielle Sanchez-Witzel	May 1, 2008	3ALJ19	6.73
67	20	"Girl Earl"	Eyal Gordin	Ralph Greene	May 8, 2008	3ALJ20	6.06
68	21	"Camdenites"	Michael Fresco	Michael Pennie & Hilary Winston	May 15, 2008	3ALJ21	7.17
69	22	"Camdenites"	Michael Fresco	Michael Pennie & Hilary Winston	May 15, 2008	3ALJ22	7.17

=== Season 4 (2008–09) ===
List of My Name Is Earl season 4 episodes
No. overall	No. in season	Title	Directed by	Written by	Original release date	Prod. code	U.S. viewers (millions)
70	1	"The Magic Hour"	Eyal Gordin	Timothy Stack	September 25, 2008	4ALJ03	6.40
71	2	"Monkeys Take a Bath"	Greg Garcia	Greg Garcia	September 25, 2008	4ALJ04	6.40
72	3	"Joy in a Bubble"	Michael Fresco	Jessica Goldstein & Chrissy Pietrosh	October 2, 2008	4ALJ05	6.72
73	4	"Stole an RV"	Chris Koch	Kat Likkel & John Hoberg	October 2, 2008	4ALJ02	6.72
74	5	"Sweet Johnny"	Eyal Gordin	Kat Likkel & John Hoberg	October 9, 2008	4ALJ06	7.17
75	6	"We've Got Spirit"	Eyal Gordin	Hilary Winston	October 16, 2008	4ALJ01	6.72
76	7	"Quit Your Snitchin'"	Chris Koch	Matt Ward	October 23, 2008	4ALJ07	6.39
77	8	"Little Bad Voodoo Brother"	Chris Koch	Alan Kirschenbaum	October 30, 2008	4ALJ10	6.27
78	9	"Sold a Guy a Lemon Car"	John Putch	Michael Pennie	November 6, 2008	4ALJ08	6.70
79	10	"Earl and Joy's Anniversary"	Michael Fresco	Danielle Sanchez-Witzel	November 13, 2008	4ALJ11	7.05
80	11	"Nature's Game Show"	Eyal Gordin	Hunter Covington	November 20, 2008	4ALJ12	6.61
81	12	"Reading Is a Fundamental Case"	Michael Fresco	Mike Mariano	December 4, 2008	4ALJ09	6.13
82	13	"Orphan Earl"	Marc Buckland	Michael Shipley	December 11, 2008	4ALJ13	6.55
83	14	"Got the Babysitter Pregnant"	Mike Mariano	Story by : Patrick McCarthy & Erika Kaestle & Vali Chandrasekaran; Teleplay by : Vali Chandrasekaran	January 8, 2009	4ALJ14	5.60
84	15	"Darnell Outed"	Ralph Greene	Ralph Greene	January 15, 2009	4ALJ15	5.99
85	16	"Darnell Outed"	Ralph Greene	Story by : Alan Kirschenbaum & Jessica Goldstein & Chrissy Pietrosh; Teleplay by : Hunter Covington & Matt Ward	January 22, 2009	4ALJ16	6.59
86	17	"Randy's List Item"	Paul Burke Pedreira	Bobby Bowman	February 5, 2009	4ALJ19	6.28
87	18	"Friends with Benefits"	Allison Liddi-Brown	Jessica Goldstein & Chrissy Pietrosh	February 12, 2009	4ALJ17	6.40
88	19	"My Name Is Alias"	Eyal Gordin	Matthew W. Thompson	February 19, 2009	4ALJ18	6.79
89	20	"Chaz Dalton's Space Academy"	Marc Buckland	Hilary Winston	March 5, 2009	4ALJ20	5.46
90	21	"Witch Lady"	Eyal Gordin	Michael Shipley & Matt Ward	March 19, 2009	4ALJ21	6.43
91	22	"Pinky"	Greg Garcia	Greg Garcia	March 26, 2009	4ALJ22	5.89
92	23	"Bullies"	Eyal Gordin	Vali Chandrasekaran & Hunter Covington	April 16, 2009	4ALJ23	5.36
93	24	"Gospel"	Ken Whittingham	Mike Mariano & Deweyne Lamar Lee	April 23, 2009	4ALJ24	5.54
94	25	"Inside Probe"	Greg Garcia	Greg Garcia	April 30, 2009	4ALJ26	5.16
95	26	"Inside Probe"	Greg Garcia	Michael Pennie & Timothy Stack	May 7, 2009	4ALJ27	6.59
96	27	"Dodge's Dad"	Chris Koch	Alan Kirschenbaum & Danielle Sanchez-Witzel	May 14, 2009	4ALJ25	4.84

== Viewing figures ==
My Name Is Earl : U.S. viewers per episode (millions)

Season	Episode number																										
Season	1	2	3	4	5	6	7	8	9	10	11	12	13	14	15	16	17	18	19	20	21	22	23	24	25	26	27
1	15.25	11.36	13.23	12.62	12.19	12.18	11.57	11.51	12.20	13.99	11.19	12.49	10.78	10.45	10.60	10.20	11.27	10.59	11.31	9.90	10.21	9.05	8.80	9.35	–		
2	8.86	8.12	9.89	9.84	8.56	9.48	9.13	9.12	9.49	10.04	10.04	10.03	10.85	9.77	10.69	9.53	9.10	8.71	6.67	7.15	7.49	7.57	6.94	–			
3	8.66	8.66	7.98	7.76	7.25	8.20	7.30	7.30	7.66	8.01	6.62	7.38	7.74	7.53	7.53	7.09	6.87	6.16	6.73	6.06	7.17	7.17	–				
4	6.40	6.40	6.72	6.72	7.17	6.72	6.39	6.27	6.70	7.05	6.61	6.13	6.55	5.60	5.99	6.59	6.28	6.40	6.79	5.46	6.43	5.89	5.36	5.54	5.16	6.59	4.84

Audience measurement performed by Nielsen Media Research
