= This Must Be Love (song) =

Single by Little Man Tate

from the album About What You Know
- B-side: "Hello Miss Lovely (So You Like My Jeans)?"; "Too Quick to Type"; "The Self Appreciation Club"
- Released: 26 March 2007
- Recorded: 2007, 2Fly, Sheffield
- Genre: Indie Rock
- Label: V2, Yellow Van
- Songwriter(s): Windle/Marriott
- Producer(s): Alan Smythe

Little Man Tate singles chronology
"Sexy in Latin" (2007)	"This Must Be Love" (2007)	"European Lover" (2007)

"This Must Be Love" was the sixth single to be released by Little Man Tate. It was released on 26 March 2007 and reached #33 in the UK singles chart. The music video starred veteran British actress Liz Smith.

== Track listings ==
CD

1. "This Must Be Love"
2. "Hello Miss Lovely (So You Like My Jeans)?"
3. "Too Quick to Type"
4. "The Self Appreciation Club"

7" vinyl picture disc

1. "This Must Be Love"
2. "The Self Appreciation Club"

7" vinyl

1. "Download
2. "This Must Be Love" (live at Sea)
3. "This Must Be Love" (live at the Boule Noir)
