= Silvia Moi =

Norwegian opera singer (born 1978)

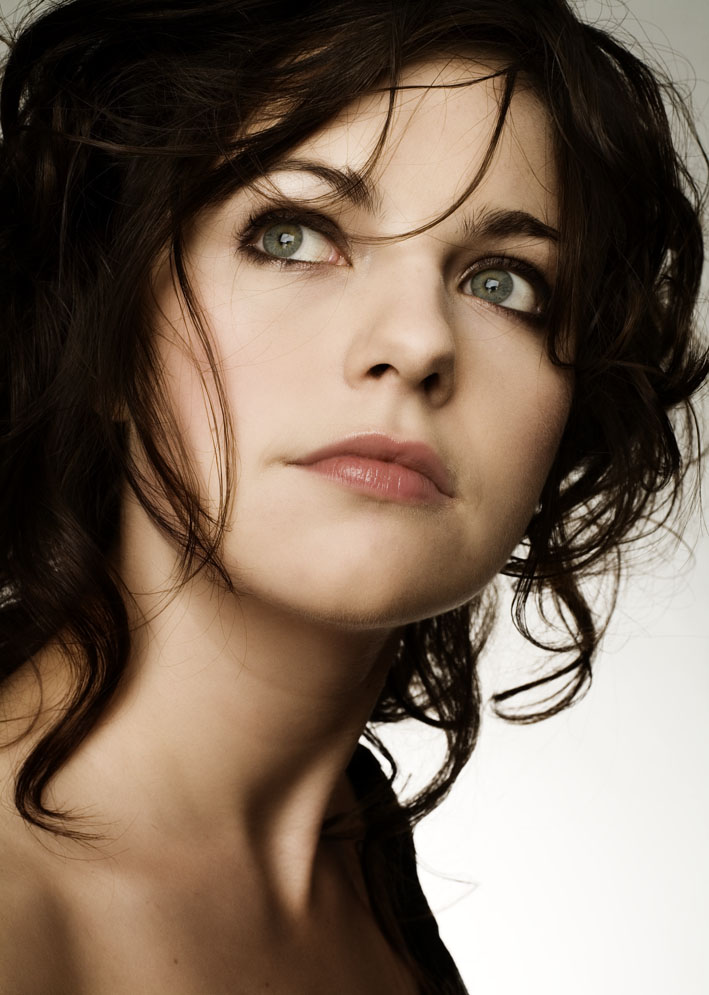
Silvia Moi

Silvia Moi (born 26 July 1978 in Kvinesdal Municipality, Vest-Agder) is a Norwegian opera singer. She has been a soloist with the Norwegian National Opera and Ballet since 2006. She appeared in Kenneth Branagh's 2006 film adaptation of The Magic Flute.
