= The Agent (Little Man Tate song) =

Single by Little Man Tate
- B-side: "Just Can't Take It"
- Released: 6 March 2006
- Recorded: 2006, Steelworks, Sheffield
- Genre: Indie rock
- Label: Yellow Van
- Songwriter(s): Windle/Marriott
- Producer(s): Shanks

Little Man Tate singles chronology
"The Agent" (2006)	"What? What You Got?" (2006)

"The Agent" was the debut single by Sheffield based indie band Little Man Tate. The single was initially released as a limited pressing of 1,800 copies on 7" vinyl, on Yellow Van Records. The single peaked at #117 in the UK Singles Chart.

The single was very highly rated by Planet Sound, who gave it 9/10, calling it the "best single of 2006" thus far. Follow up single "What? What You Got?" also scored 9/10, making them one of only 3 artists to get 2 9/10 ratings with songs on one album, along with Muse and The Magic Numbers.

== Track listing ==
1. "The Agent"
2. "Just Can't Take It"
