= 9/11: The Falling Man =

- Directed by: Henry Singer
- Starring: Steven Mackintosh; Iliana Guibert
- Country of origin: United Kingdom
- Original language: English

Production
- Producer: Henry Singer
- Running time: 90 minutes

Original release
- Network: Channel 4
- Release: 16 March 2006

9/11: The Falling Man is a 2006 British television documentary film about the photo The Falling Man. It is made by American filmmaker Henry Singer and filmed by Richard Numeroff, a New York-based director of photography. The film is loosely based on Junod's Esquire story. It also drew its material from photographer Lyle Owerko's pictures of falling people. It debuted on March 16, 2006, on the British television network Channel 4, later made its North American premiere on Canada's CBC Newsworld on September 6, 2006, and has been broadcast in more than 30 countries. The U.S. premiere was September 10, 2007, on the Discovery Times Channel.

== Synopsis ==
On September 11, 2001, a man jumps from a window of the World Trade Center in New York City following the terrorist attack. The image of the jump was captured by photographer Richard Drew, and the photograph became famous around the world. The documentary seeks to identify the man in the photograph.

== Cast ==
- Steven Mackintosh as Narrator (voice)
- Iliana Guibert as Herself

== Awards and nominations ==
Year	Award	Category	Nominee	Result
2006	34th International Emmy Awards	Best Documentary	9/11: The Falling Man	Nominated
2007	2007 British Academy Television Awards	Best Documentary	9/11: The Falling Man	Nominated
