= Nothing Worth Having Comes Easy =

Studio album by Little Man Tate
- Released: 15 September 2008
- Recorded: 2008
- Genre: Indie rock
- Length: 44:04
- Label: Skint Records

Little Man Tate chronology
About What You Know (2007)	Nothing Worth Having Comes Easy (2008)

Professional ratings
Review scores
Source	Rating
The Line of Best Fit	53%
MusicOMH	2/5 stars

Nothing Worth Having Comes Easy is the second album by Sheffield band Little Man Tate released on 15 September 2008. It was released as a standard CD and a special enhanced version with exclusive video footage.

== Track listing ==
All songs written by Jon Windle and Edward 'Maz' Marriott.

1. "Money Wheel"
2. "What Your Boyfriend Said"
3. "She Looked Like Audrey Hepburn"
4. "Shot at Politics"
5. "Hey Little Sweetie"
6. "Joined by an iPod"
7. "Face on a Wall"
8. "A Little Heart"
9. "Time for Anything"
10. "Back of the Pub Quiz"
11. "London Skies London Eyes"
12. "Shoulder to Sigh On"
13. "The Last Hurrah" (Bonus track)
