= Cord (band) =

English rock band

- Origin: Norfolk, England, UK
- Genres: Alternative rock, indie rock
- Labels: Island Records, NRone
- Members: James Leeds; Phil Davison; Mike Jackson
- Past members: Andrew Walsh

Cord (often written as C/O/R/D) are an English band from Norfolk, England. Originally signed by Island Records on a five-album deal they were released from their contract in March 2007. The band's song "Go Either Way" is featured on the soundtrack for EA's video game Madden NFL 07. Also, the song "Sea of Trouble" was featured in the NME Essential Bands 2007. Their song "Winter" reached the Top 40 in the UK Singles Chart.

The band split in 2008, however reformed in 2010 and released their second album, Later Is Better for Me, If That's Okay?, in 2011 on the NRone record label.

== Line up ==
- James Leeds - Vocals, Keyboard
- Phil Davison - Drums
- Mike Jackson - Guitar, Keyboard, Backing Vocals
- Andrew Walsh - Bass (former)

== Discography ==
=== Albums ===
- Other People's Lives Are Not As Perfect As They Seem (2006)
- Later Is Better for Me, If That's Okay (2011)

=== Singles ===
- "Winter"
- "Go Either Way" (2006)
- "Winter" (re-release) (2006) (UK No. 34)
- "Sea of Trouble" (2006) (UK No. 50)
