= Hey Little Sweetie =

Single by Little Man Tate

from the album Nothing Worth Having Comes Easy
- B-side: "Nigel"; "Pay Days Thursday"
- Released: 8 September 2008
- Recorded: 2008, 2Fly, Sheffield
- Genre: Indie rock
- Label: Skint/Yellow Van
- Songwriter(s): Windle/Marriott
- Producer(s): Alan Smythe

Little Man Tate singles chronology
"What Your Boyfriend Said" (2008)	"Hey Little Sweetie" (2008)	"I Am Alive" (2009)

"Hey Little Sweetie" is the ninth single to be released by Little Man Tate. It was released on 8 September 2008 and reached #142 in the UK Singles Chart

== Track listings ==
CD

1. "Hey Little Sweetie"
2. "Nigel"
3. "Pay Days Thursday"

7" Picture Disc

1. "Hey Little Sweetie"
2. "Nigel"

Download

1. "Hey Little Sweetie" (acoustic)
