= Sexy in Latin =

Single by Little Man Tate

from the album About What You Know
- B-side: "Balko's Barren Patch"; "Half Empty Glass"; "She's Become So Special"
- Released: 22 January 2007
- Recorded: 2006, 2Fly, Sheffield
- Genre: Indie Rock
- Label: V2, Yellow Van
- Songwriter(s): Windle/Marriott
- Producer(s): Eliot James, Alan Smythe

Little Man Tate singles chronology
"Man I Hate Your Band" (2006)	"Sexy in Latin" (2007)	"This Must Be Love" (2007)

"Sexy in Latin" was the fifth single to be released by Little Man Tate. It was released on 22 January 2007, one week before their debut album About What You Know. The single became their first top 20 single, on Sunday 28 January 2007 when it reached number 20 in the UK Singles Chart.

== Track listings ==
CD

1. "Sexy in Latin"
2. "Balko's Barren Patch"

7" vinyl

1. "Sexy in Latin" (acoustic)
2. "Half Empty Glass" (acoustic)

7" vinyl, limited edition

1. "Sexy in Latin"
2. "She's Become So Special"

Download

1. "Sexy in Latin" (live in Amsterdam)
2. "Sexy in Latin" (live at the Boardwalk)
