= House Party at Boothy's =

Single by Little Man Tate

from the album About What You Know
- B-side: "Teenager"; "Man I Hate Your Band"
- Released: 28 August 2006
- Recorded: 2006, Steelworks, Sheffield
- Genre: Indie Rock
- Label: V2, Yellow Van
- Songwriter(s): Windle/Marriott
- Producer(s): 1. Eliot James; 2. Shanks

Little Man Tate singles chronology
"What? What You Got?" (2006)	"House Party at Boothy's" (2006)	"Man I Hate Your Band" (2006)

"House Party at Boothy's" was the third single by Little Man Tate. After its first week of release, it reached 29 in the UK Singles chart. The song is about house parties the band used to go to hosted by their Boothy's. The track appeared on NME Presents: The Essential Bands 2006.

== Format ==
The cover is based on the design for Magners cider.

The inside sleeve of the vinyl features an Ordnance Survey map, with an arrow pointing directly to the house where these parties were held. The back of the single features a phone number, which when called in 2006 yielded a recorded message from Boothy, inviting you to a house party which MTV attended.

== Track listings ==
CD

1. "House Party at Boothy's"
2. "Teenager"

7" vinyl, #1

1. "House Party at Boothy's"
2. "Teenager"

7" vinyl, #2 (limited)

1. "House Party at Boothy's" (Steve Lamacq Session)
2. "Man I Hate Your Band" (Steve Lamacq Session)
