= Amanda Berry (film executive) =

British media businesswoman

Amanda Berry CBE
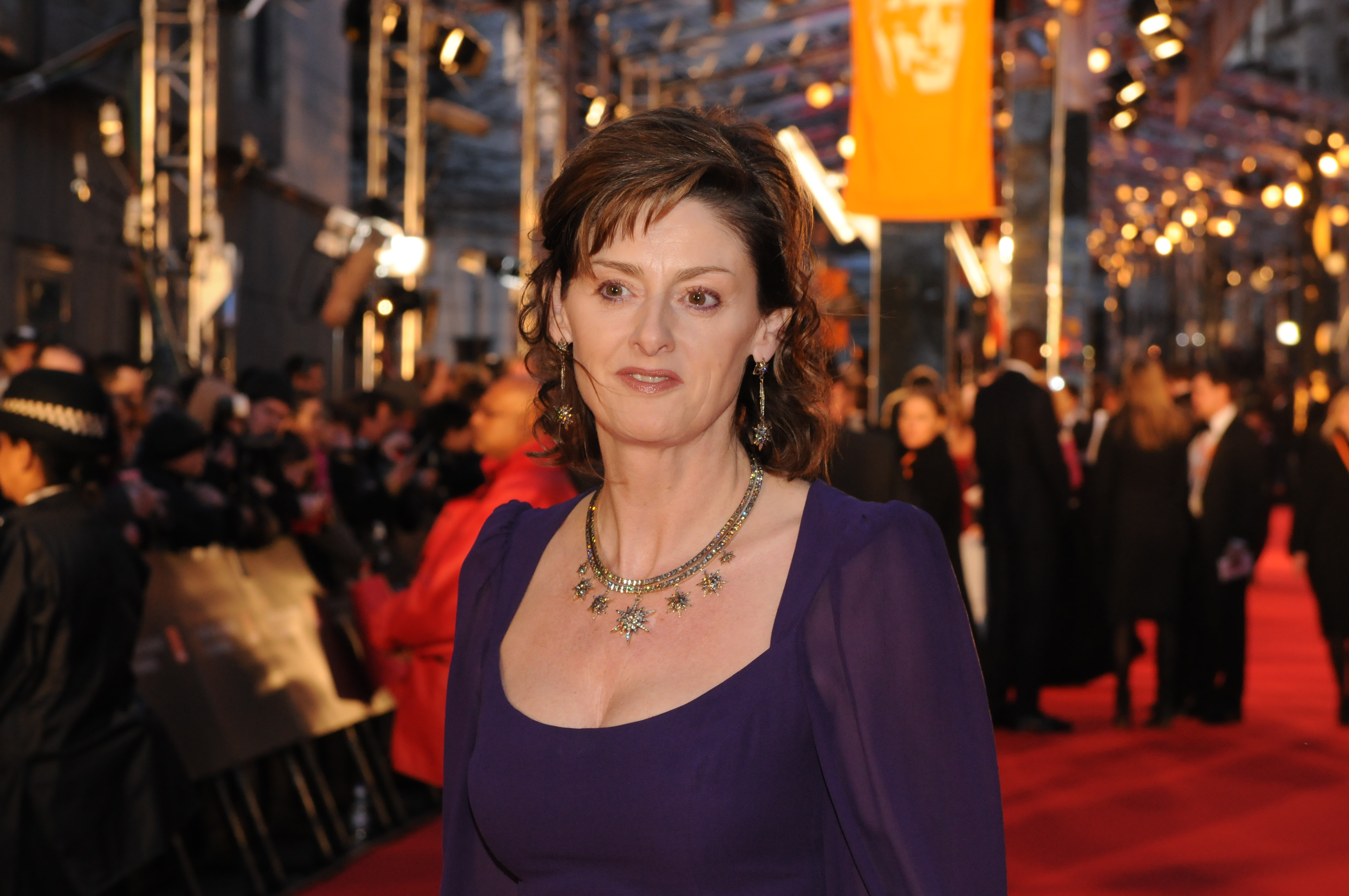
- Born: Amanda Sonia Berry; 20 August 1961 (age 64); Darlington, County Durham, England
- Occupation: Businesswoman

Amanda Sonia Berry (born 20 August 1961) is an English businesswoman. She was CEO of the British Academy of Film and Television Arts (BAFTA) from December 2000 to October 2022, as well as CEO of the Royal Foundation from June 2022 to February 2026.

== Early life ==
Berry was born in Darlington, County Durham, but raised in Richmond, North Yorkshire; She is the daughter of Tom (owner of a dry cleaning company in Richmond, North Yorkshire) and Anita Berry. She is the eldest of three children.

Berry read business studies and graphic design at Newcastle Polytechnic, and took a student job in the press office of Thames Television.

== Career ==
In 1982, Berry left her studies to continue at Thames Television and then took a job at theatrical agency Duncan Heath Associates Ltd (which later became part of the International Creative Management (ICM) Group). Her clients included Christopher Lee, Ian McShane, Paul McCartney and David Bowie. She left the company as a director in 1988.

In 1989, Berry worked at London Weekend Television (LWT) as a researcher for light entertainment. From 1990, she worked extensively as a producer and development executive for Scottish Television Enterprises, both in Glasgow and in London, where her credits included three BAFTA awards ceremonies.

=== BAFTA ===
Berry joined BAFTA in October 1998 as Director of Development and Events. She became its chief executive in December 2000, and is widely acknowledged to have transformed the fortunes of the Academy in 2001, bringing the date of its annual Film Awards ceremony ahead of the American Academy's Oscars. The move boosted BAFTA's international profile at a time when it was eclipsed by other organisations in the awards season, and studios and industry commentators now rate BAFTA's Film Awards as one of the most reliable predictors of the Oscars, as well as being the pre-eminent film awards outside the annual Hollywood ceremony.

== Honours ==
Berry was appointed an OBE for services to the film industry in Elizabeth II's 2009 Birthday Honours List.

In 1999, Berry was named Media Boss of the Year by recruitment company Pathfinders and Woman of the Year. In 2010, she was named in The Daily Telegraph list of 100 Most Powerful Women in Britain: Entertainment, Media and Sport. In 2012, she made The Times' British Film Power 100, the Women in Film and Television Power List, and the Women: Inspiration & Enterprise's Power 50. In 2013, she topped the 'film' list of the Guardian Culture Professionals Network and Hospital Club's h.club100, their 'annual search for the most influential, innovative and interesting people in the creative and media industries'. In 2015 she was named in The Daily Telegraph list of 10 Most Powerful Women in the Arts and received the BKSTS Outstanding Contribution to the Industry award. Berry regularly features in the Evening Standard list of the 1,000 Most Influential People and in Debrett's 500, "a recognition and celebration of Britain's 500 most influential people". In 2017 she was named in The Times Film Power List, the British newspaper's ranking of "the star players with global clout". In 2018 she was named in the Variety 500, "an index of the 500 most influential business leaders shaping the global $2 trillion entertainment industry".
