= About What You Know =

Studio album by Little Man Tate
- Released: 29 January 2007
- Recorded: 2006
- Genre: Indie rock
- Length: 36:32
- Label: V2 Records
- Producer: Elliot James

Little Man Tate chronology
About What You Know (2007)	Nothing Worth Having Comes Easy (2008)

Professional ratings
Review scores
Source	Rating
Allmusic	4/5 stars
Drowned in Sound	(3/10)
musicOMH.com	4/5 stars

About What You Know is the title of the debut album by Sheffield band Little Man Tate. It was released on both standard CD version, plus Limited Edition CD/DVD version, and a Limited Edition heavy yellow vinyl of which there were only 1000 copies. The album was released on 29 January 2007, one week after their single "Sexy In Latin". The album title is a reference to the tagline of the film Little Man Tate, to which the band owe their name.

== Track listing ==
All songs written by Jon Windle and Edward 'Maz' Marriott.

1. "Man I Hate Your Band"
2. "European Lover"
3. "Sexy in Latin"
4. "This Must Be Love"
5. "House Party at Boothy's"
6. "Who Invented These Lists?"
7. "Court Report"
8. "Little Big Man"
9. "3 Day Rule"
10. "This Girl Isn't My Girlfriend"
11. "Down on Marie"
12. "What? What You Got?" (Hidden Track)
