= Pilot (My Name Is Earl) =

- My Name Is Earl episode
- Episode no.: Season 1 Episode 1
- Directed by: Marc Buckland
- Written by: Greg Garcia
- Production code: 001
- Original air date: September 20, 2005

Episode chronology
← Previous —	Next → "Quit Smoking"

"Pilot" is the pilot episode and the first episode of the first season of the American sitcom My Name Is Earl. The episode was written by series creator Greg Garcia and directed by Marc Buckland. "Pilot" originally aired in the United States on NBC on September 20, 2005.

== Plot ==
Earl Hickey (Jason Lee), a thief, narrates the last few years of his life, explaining that he married a six-month pregnant woman named Joy (Jaime Pressly) while drunk in 1999. Earl and his brother Randy (Ethan Suplee) moved in with Joy to a trailer park. Earl and Joy had their own child, Earl Jr., in 2001, but he was a black boy, implying that Joy cheated on Earl with African-American Darnell "Crabman" Turner (Eddie Steeples).

In 2005, Earl wins $100,000 in the lottery, but is immediately hit by a car and watches the ticket blow away. While he recovers in the hospital, Joy divorces him, and Earl is introduced to karma while watching talk-show host Carson Daly; do bad things and bad things happen, do good things and good things happen. This makes sense to Earl, so he decides to try to make up for all the bad things he has done and makes a written list of 259 items.

After leaving the hospital, Earl and Randy move into a motel where they meet a pretty Mexican maid, Catalina (Nadine Velazquez). When Earl picks up trash to atone for item #136, "I've been a litterbug", he finds his lost lottery ticket. He decides that karma works, and as such resolves to continue making up for items on the list, beginning with #64: "Picked on Kenny James".

Earl, Randy and Catalina find Kenny's parents' house, and Earl sends Randy to find out from them where Kenny lives. Randy poses as former class president looking for Kenny, but offends the Jameses who call the police. Regardless, Randy makes his escape with the address. Earl spies on Kenny to figure out how best to help him. Kenny's life is good, but he has nobody to share it with, so Earl decides to hire a prostitute, Patty, to have sex with him. When Kenny refuses free sex, Earl talks to Kenny in person, not understanding why he turned down sex. However, Randy finds homosexual pornography in Kenny's nightstand. He and Earl, never having met a homosexual person, flee the house in fear.

Although he tries to ignore Kenny, calling the list item "special circumstances", Earl is shortly thereafter attacked by Joy and realizes: there are no special circumstances. He returns to Kenny's house and asks why Kenny doesn't have a man. Kenny answers that nobody knows he is gay, and he is afraid to go to a gay bar. Earl agrees to come with him, to give him needed support and cross Kenny off his list. They go with Randy to a gay bar, where Kenny builds up the confidence to talk to a man. Acknowledging the cathartic irony of being accepted for who he is by the man he once feared the most, he thanks Earl and says he can cross him off his list.

== Production ==
=== Awards ===
Marc Buckland won an Emmy for directing "Pilot". Greg Garcia also won an Emmy in the writing category. The episode additionally won the GLAAD Media Award for Outstanding Individual Episode.

=== Continuity ===
"Pilot" introduced the premise and main characters of the series. Also, both Kenny and Patty the Daytime Hooker became recurring characters in the series, Kenny re-appearing as early as the third episode. A season 4 episode, "Earl and Joy's Anniversary" would reveal that Kenny and Patty previously participated in a foursome, making their interactions in this episode negative continuity.

=== Deleted scene ===
A deleted scene from this episode was included on the season 1 DVD. As Kenny and Earl are about to enter the gay bar, a group of college students drive up to them. In response to one shouting "fags" out the window, Earl walks up to the college student, pulls him out of the car, punches him in the face, and tells him to learn about tolerance. Kenny stops Earl, who asks for the student's name to put on his list, explaining that he must make up for his mistake.
