= My Name Is Earl season 2 =

My Name Is Earl
- Season 2
- DVD cover
- Showrunner: Greg Garcia
- No. of episodes: 23

Release
- Original network: NBC
- Original release: September 21, 2006 – May 10, 2007

Season chronology
- ← Previous; Season 1 Next → Season 3

The second season of My Name Is Earl originally aired from September 21, 2006, to May 10, 2007, on NBC. The season consisted of 23 episodes. The DVD of the season was originally released on September 25, 2007. Its bonus material included deleted scenes, commentary tracks on selected episodes, as well as other features.

Unlike the previous season, there was a loose story arc, in which Joy steals a truck and accidentally kidnaps a man inside it. As this was her third strike, Joy faced life imprisonment, leading to her trial in the season finale.

== Main cast ==
- Jason Lee as Earl Hickey
- Jaime Pressly as Joy Turner
- Ethan Suplee as Randy Hickey
- Nadine Velazquez as Catalina
- Eddie Steeples as Darnell Turner

== Episodes ==
List of My Name Is Earl season 2 episodes
| No. overall | No. in season | Title | Directed by | Written by (Note: In the Writers Guild of America screenwriting credit system, an ampersand (&) is used to denote writers who worked together as a team, while the word "and" refers to writers who worked on the same teleplay independently.) | Original release date | Prod. code | U.S. viewers (millions) |
|---|---|---|---|---|---|---|---|
| 25 | 1 | "Very Bad Things" | Marc Buckland | Michael Pennie | September 21, 2006 | 2ALJ02 | 8.86 |
Earl helps Joy try to get rid of a stolen delivery truck, which becomes harder when they discover that someone is still in the back of the truck. Joy keeps the poor man hostage and forces Earl to make a run for the border, but Earl decides it's a plan too crazy to actually work and makes Joy turn herself in. Except—it means she's at risk of her third strike, which if convicted Joy will be in prison for the rest of her life.
| 26 | 2 | "Jump for Joy" | Chris Koch | Vali Chandrasekaran | September 28, 2006 | 2ALJ03 | 8.12 |
Earl and Randy ask Catalina to return to her old job at the strip club, but they don't tell her that they need her to do it so that club owner Richard Chubby (Burt Reynolds) will pay for Joy's bail. When Catalina does find out about Joy's bail she angrily rejects it. So Joy performs at Club Chubby for her bail but, to calm her nerves, drinks so much that she throws up on the audience. Catalina sees how stressed out Earl is and takes back her job, saying, "When I jump, I jump for Earl; I would never jump for Joy."
| 27 | 3 | "Sticks & Stones" | Marc Buckland | Danielle Sanchez-Witzel | October 5, 2006 | 2ALJ01 | 9.89 |
Earl makes up for teasing a bearded girl in school, and it forces him to confront his fear of taking his shirt off in public because of his unusually hairy nipples. He ends up helping the bearded woman, and her unusual circus friends, to feel more comfortable with themselves.
| 28 | 4 | "Larceny of a Kitty Cat" | Millicent Shelton | Hilary Winston | October 12, 2006 | 2ALJ05 | 9.84 |
When Randy has a crush on the next woman on Earl's list (Amy Sedaris), he pretends to be a cat lover, despite an allergy. But based on Randy's past experiences as a poser, Earl knows that this one will end badly.
| 29 | 5 | "Van Hickey" | Craig Zisk | Story by : J.B. Cook & Marc Singer; Teleplay by : J.B. Cook | October 19, 2006 | 2ALJ04 | 8.56 |
Earl has to get his old band back together to take care of an elderly man (Larry Hankin) on his list. But it only brings out a nasty secret which ultimately forces Earl to marry Ralph's mom.
| 30 | 6 | "Made a Lady Think I Was God" | Marc Buckland | Bobby Bowman | November 2, 2006 | 2ALJ06 | 9.48 |
Earl wants to make amends to an angry, bitter trailer park manager (Roseanne Barr) for playing a trick on her. But the trick caused her to change her life for the better, and the apology makes her even angrier than she ever was.
| 31 | 7 | "Mailbox" | Michael Fresco | Kat Likkel & John Hoberg | November 9, 2006 | 2ALJ08 | 9.13 |
Catalina wants to help Earl on one of his items. She chooses #75: used a mail box as a trash can. Earl and Randy find some undelivered letters in the mailbox and try to return them to their senders. One of the letters was a love letter from a guy who was a personal trainer and fell in love with his co-worker at the gym, but when Earl finds the girl (Jenny McCarthy), he falls in love with her, although she seems to send mixed messages, forcing Catalina to bring in the guy to get Earl away from the girl. Meanwhile, Randy delivers a second letter to Joy and upon opening it, she discovers that Darnell is part of a witness protection program with his real name being Harry Monroe. Joy kicks Darnell out of their trailer and refuses to let him back in until he tells her the truth.
| 32 | 8 | "Robbed a Stoner Blind" | Marc Buckland | Kat Likkel & John Hoberg | November 16, 2006 | 2ALJ07 | 9.12 |
Earl and Randy attempt to make amends with a former drug addict Woody (Christian Slater) from whom they robbed everything including his air conditioner, They agree to join him at a commune for a week where they live off-the-grid, reduce their eco-footprint and eating vegan in order to reduce global warming. Randy ingests a bunch of herbal medicine which causes him to see everyone in clay animation. Earl goes crazy that everyone else is being wasteful. Woody tells Earl to just work on his list and do a little bit to improve the world every day.
| 33 | 9 | "Born a Gamblin' Man" | Chris Koch | Victor Fresco | November 30, 2006 | 2ALJ10 | 9.49 |
After being dumped by his partner, Kenny James asks Earl to teach him to be more masculine and more like Earl to attract gay men. Joy joins an all-purpose addiction recovery group to deal with her anger management. Randy gets ready to reveal to Catalina that he loves her. Earl shows Kenny how to bet on dog racing, but Kenny gets hooked on it and loses all his household items. Earl too becomes addicted to gambling, and ends up making Catalina late for work, where she is arrested by the cops and is deported.
| 34 | 10 | "South of the Border" | Michael Fresco | Michael Pennie | December 7, 2006 | 2ALJ12 | 10.04 |
| 35 | 11 | "South of the Border" | Marc Buckland | Danielle Sanchez-Witzel | December 7, 2006 | 2ALJ13 | 10.04 |
Earl and Randy try to head south to look for Catalina in Mexico, but Earl gets a fear of flying on the airplane. Darnell is more irritated that Joy is behaving usually cheerfully because of some pills she has been taking and because their neighbors moved their trailer closer to hers. The doctor gives Earl a sedative but it wears off right before it takes off and he is restrained. Later, Earl and Randy fight between getting a taco or getting on a bus to Catalina's village. Earl is kidnapped by some bandits. At Catalina's village, when Randy eats a sandwich that a family left for their deceased son, Randy must spend the night with them. Banditos bring Earl to their boss Diego (John Leguizamo) who turns out to be Catalina's uncle, and Earl has to go along with them on their missions. Randy is heartbroken when Diego tells Catalina that Earl has agreed to marry her so that she can obtain a green card. Earl must complete a series of tests to become her husband. He fails them so that Randy will have the chance to pass them and marry her instead. Meanwhile, Darnell continues to be annoyed by the neighbors who have parked too close to their trailer, while Joy remains on happy pills.
| 36 | 12 | "Our 'Cops' Is On" | Ken Whittingham | Timothy Stack | January 4, 2007 | 2ALJ09 | 10.03 |
The townspeople gather around the Crab Shack's TV to watch a rerun of a Cops episode that features the police and characters from Camden County.
| 37 | 13 | "Buried Treasure" | Eyal Gordin | Erika Kaestle & Patrick McCarthy | January 11, 2007 | 2ALJ11 | 10.85 |
Years ago, Earl, Joy and Randy had stolen and buried some historic silverware from the town library. Earl writes a ransom note for the silverware. But when Earl goes to dig up the silverware, he is unable to find it. Randy narrates the next part of the episode where he had moved the silverware to give it to a swindler. Joy narrates her story where she had changed out the silverware from the box. She tried to melt it but Jasper would not take it, and ends up buying it in another location in the trailer park. Darnell then narrates his story of when he moved the silverware from there back to the library.
| 38 | 14 | "Kept a Guy Locked in a Truck" | Eyal Gordin | Kat Likkel & John Hoberg | January 18, 2007 | 2ALJ14 | 9.77 |
Earl discovers that Josh, the man that he had locked in the back of the truck from the season 2 episode opener has died. He is bothered over how he can make amends, and has a dream that he needs to throw a funeral for him. The funeral doesn't go well as the townsfolk treat it as a party until he snaps to get everyone's attention. Eventually, Joy and Earl discover that Josh had a number of online friends, and they throw a memorial. Meanwhile, Randy and Catalina look for an apartment. (John Waters appears as a funeral director.)
| 39 | 15 | "Foreign Exchange Student" | Marc Buckland | Mike Mariano | February 1, 2007 | 2ALJ15 | 10.69 |
In school, Earl had strangled a French foreign exchange student named Pierre, but to make amends, he invites the Frenchman back to Camden County. Pierre (Ernie Grunwald) just wants to hit Earl and leave, he headbutts Earl, a reference to Zinedine Zidane, but Earl steals his wallet and passport so he can stay in town a few days where Earl gets his friends to talk about how great America is. Randy gets so jealous that Pierre gets along with Catalina, that he strangles him. Randy finally tells Catalina he loves her and Catalina replies she does too, but tells Earl she doesn't really. While Earl learns the real reason Pierre came to America. Catalina, who made herself as unappealing as possible, discovers that Randy has given her the best sex she's ever had.
| 40 | 16 | "Blow" | Victor Nelli, Jr. | J.B. Cook | February 8, 2007 | 2ALJ16 | 9.53 |
Joy learns that she has a half-sister named Liberty Washington, a rival that she hated since grade school. Earl wants to make up to Liberty that he stole her credit card back then so he and Randy help her achieve her dream of being a professional wrestler. Joy wants to have a baby to make herself more sympathetic in court, and Earl suggests that she be Liberty's surrogate mother. But the two sisters hate the idea until Earl puts the two of them in a wrestling ring.
| 41 | 17 | "The Birthday Party" | Eyal Gordin | Hilary Winston | February 15, 2007 | 2ALJ17 | 9.10 |
Earl celebrates his birthday but his friends remind him of more unresolved issues on this list. He leaves dejectedly but comes across Didi who is still intent on killing him. He returns to hide in his apartment where his friends surprise him with a party and then cross off more items from the list.
| 42 | 18 | "Guess Who's Coming Out of Joy" | Mike Fresco | Greg Garcia | February 22, 2007 | 2ALJ18 | 8.71 |
Joy's pregnancy makes Earl reflect on his marriage between him and Joy, and the conflicts between himself and Joy cheating on him with Darnell. And how his father helped him do his first good deed ever.
| 43 | 19 | "Harassed a Reporter" | Chris Koch | Barbie Adler & Brad Copeland | April 12, 2007 | 2ALJ19 | 6.67 |
Earl tries to make amends with a television reporter Nicole Moses (Leigh-Allyn Baker), whose career was ruined after Earl and the gang had repeatedly placed themselves in her news reports and other on-screen shenanigans. Nicole interviews Earl about him and his List with the hopes that it will bring back her career. Randy wants to get on television as well.
| 44 | 20 | "Two Balls, Two Strikes" | Victor Nelli, Jr. | Bobby Bowman | April 19, 2007 | 2ALJ22 | 7.15 |
After Camden County's most prominent businessman Richard Chubby dies, his son Little Chubby (Norm Macdonald, his appearance and mannerisms consistent with his frequent impersonation of Burt Reynolds while a cast member on Saturday Night Live) takes over. Little Chubby had a terrible demeanor until Earl had kicked him in the testicles years ago. Earl wants to cross Little Chubby off his list by helping him through his operation to fix the swelling. However, with his testosterone levels restored, Little Chubby reverts to being mean and cruel again.
| 45 | 21 | "G.E.D." | Michael Fresco | Hunter Covington | April 26, 2007 | 2ALJ20 | 7.49 |
Earl's application for a credit card is rejected because he lacks a high school diploma, a job, and a real place to live. He decides he needs to take some big steps towards finally growing up. When Earl returns to school to study for the GED, he finds that his old teachers have given up as they had to deal with students who have the same bad attitude as Earl had. They give him a chance to teach the class, but it doesn't help.
| 46 | 22 | "Get a Real Job" | Ken Whittingham | Story by : Ralph Greene & Patrick McCarthy & Erika Kaestle; Teleplay by : Patrick McCarthy & Erika Kaestle | May 3, 2007 | 2ALJ21 | 7.57 |
Earl and Randy work at an appliance store as truck loaders. Earl is determined to work in front as a salesman, but neither the loaders in the back nor the junior college-educated salesmen in the front support him. His boss gives him a chance on the condition that he sell five thousand dollars of equipment, but the salesmen sabotage his efforts. Meanwhile, with her court date approaching, Joy buys Darnelll an inflatable doll resembling her so he won't be lonely, but escapes that night to flee to Mexico.
| 47 | 23 | "The Trial" | Michael Fresco | Timothy Stack, Mike Mariano and Vali Chandrasekaran | May 10, 2007 | 2ALJ23 | 6.94 |
Joy is caught by Dog the Bounty Hunter in Mexico and returns for her trial. As the next item on Earl's grown-up List is to find someone to love, he falls for Joy's lawyer Ruby Whitlow (Marlee Matlin). However, after their one-night stand, Ruby discovers through Earl's List that he had taken advantage of her deafness to loudly burglarize her apartment. To make matters worse, Doug injures his tongue, rendering himself unable to speak for Ruby, with the only other sign language interpreter speaking fluent Mandarin instead of English, and the prosecution has abundant evidence of Joy committing the crime. However, Ruby, with the help of a Nescobar-A-Lop-Lop who translates Mandarin to English, is able to sway the jury towards a 50/50 chance of winning. However, when the prosecutor presents tapes of Earl's 911 calls where he is reporting about Joy, the momentum is lost. Realizing Joy has no chance of acquittal, Earl admits to the court that he committed the crimes. The judge sentences Earl to two years in prison, and thus Earl has to give up his job, his apartment, his love life, and his List.

== Home media ==
20th Century Fox Home Entertainment produces and distributes season 2.
