= My Name Is Earl season 1 =

My Name Is Earl
- Season 1
- DVD cover
- Showrunner: Greg Garcia
- No. of episodes: 24

Release
- Original network: NBC
- Original release: September 20, 2005 – May 11, 2006

Season chronology
- Next → Season 2

The first season of My Name Is Earl, an American sitcom television series created by Greg Garcia, premiered on September 20, 2005, and ended on May 11, 2006, on NBC. The DVD set was released on Region 2 on September 25, 2006, and on Region 1 on September 19, 2006. Its bonus material included: commentary for each episode, bloopers and deleted scenes. The show is broadcast in English, however in other countries it will be in other languages, there are also English subtitles. Season 1 of My Name Is Earl runs for about 526 minutes and about 20 minutes for each episode. The season 1 DVD is produced by 20th Century Fox Home Entertainment.

Most episodes from the first season begin with Earl presenting the premise of the series:

You know the kind of guy who does nothing but bad things and then wonders why his life sucks? Well, that was me. Every time something good happened to me, something bad was always waiting around the corner: karma. That's when I realized that I had to change, so I made a list of everything bad I've ever done and one by one I'm gonna make up for all my mistakes. I'm just trying to be a better person. My name is Earl.

== Main cast ==
- Jason Lee as Earl Hickey
- Ethan Suplee as Randy Hickey
- Jaime Pressly as Joy Darville Turner
- Eddie Steeples as Darnell Turner
- Nadine Velazquez as Catalina

== Episodes ==
List of My Name Is Earl season 1 episodes
No. overall	No. in season	Title	Directed by	Written by (Note: In the Writers Guild of America screenwriting credit system, an ampersand (&) is used to denote writers who worked together as a team, while the word "and" refers to writers who worked on the same teleplay independently.)	Original release date	Prod. code	U.S. viewers (millions)
1	1	"Pilot"	Marc Buckland	Greg Garcia	September 20, 2005	1ALJ79	15.25
Earl J. Hickey (Jason Lee) is a small-time thief with a messed-up life. His "scratch-and-win" lottery ticket proves to be worth $100,000, but he is immediately hit by a car and watches the ticket blow away. While Earl recovers in hospital, his wife Joy (Jaime Pressly) divorces him, but Earl is introduced to the concept of karma while watching an interview with singer Trace Adkins on Last Call with Carson Daly. He resolves to try to make up for all the bad things he has done and writes a list of 259 items. After leaving the hospital he starts on his list by picking up litter, and right away finds his lost $100,000 ticket. Figuring karma works pretty well, he continues with the list, going next to #64: "Picked on Kenny James." Earl figures he needs to help Kenny to have friends. To Earl's shock, he learns that Kenny is gay and wants to skip this list item. After wrestling with what to do, he decides karma makes the rules to be kept, not he. Finally, he and his brother Randy (Ethan Suplee) resolve to take Kenny to a gay bar where he can find friends. Meanwhile Earl and Randy meet Catalina (Nadine Velazquez), the motel's beautiful maid, and Randy finds that he has feelings for her.
2	2	"Quit Smoking"	Marc Buckland	Kat Likkel & John Hoberg	September 27, 2005	1ALJ01	11.36
Donny, an intimidating thug, spent two years in jail for a robbery Earl committed. Oddly enough, the only way Earl can make it up to him is by helping Donny's mom quit smoking. Meanwhile, Joy discovers she's the beneficiary of Earl's will and tries to kill him.
3	3	"Randy's Touchdown"	Marc Buckland	J.B. Cook	October 4, 2005	1ALJ02	13.23
While Earl and Randy were in high school, Earl fixed a school football game to win a bet with a store owner, but realizes that he forced Randy to give up a touchdown that he would've gotten. Earl sends Randy back to high school to get his touchdown back, but finds out that Joy had his car impounded since he refused to give her any of his lotto money. Unknown to Joy at the time, the car contained the lotto money. Earl and Randy go to the impound yard to get the car back, but Earl has to pay $3000 for unpaid parking tickets. Meanwhile, during Randy's game, Earl and Catalina were there to give him support, and Randy almost gets a touchdown, but fumbles the ball, which costs his team the game. Earl finds out that Joy (who in the meantime had found out the money was in the car) got the $3000 to get his lotto money, but Randy drives up with his car and his money, and Randy told him that he fumbled the ball on purpose to win a bet for $3000.
4	4	"Faked My Own Death"	Tamra Davis	Hilary Winston	October 11, 2005	1ALJ05	12.62
When Earl met a raunchy biker chick at a Halloween party, it looked like a match made in heaven. But when he discovered the biker-girl persona was just a Halloween costume, the mismatch became apparent, as she was revealed to be a fluffy toy collector and nature-lover. Earl took drastic measures to get out of the relationship, culminating in getting Randy to tell her he's been killed. To cross her off his list, Earl must reveal that he isn't really dead. When her current boyfriend (Dax Shepard) pulls the same trick, Earl finds himself once again trapped by her.
5	5	"Teacher Earl"	Chris Koch	Victor Fresco	October 18, 2005	1ALJ04	12.19
With Catalina's advice, Earl decides to teach English as a Second language to cross "Made fun of people with accents" off his karma list. Meanwhile Ralph, an old friend and partner-in-crime, is released from prison; Earl tries to teach him about karma, but Ralph kidnaps Randy to try to get his hands on Earl's lottery winnings.
6	6	"Broke Joy's Fancy Figurine"	Lev L. Spiro	Danielle Sanchez-Witzel	November 1, 2005	1ALJ03	12.18
To replace a fancy figurine that he broke, Earl lends a hand to help Joy's former adversary (Missi Pyle) and her daughter (Chloë Grace Moretz) win a mother/daughter beauty pageant. Joy enters the pageant also with her "dead" mother trying to win that same figurine, believing that if she prevents Earl from winning it then she can force him to buy her a hot tub in exchange.
7	7	"Stole Beer from a Golfer"	Chris Koch	Michael Pennie	November 8, 2005	1ALJ06	11.57
It's time for the Camden County Fair and Randy is eager to go, having gone with Earl every year since they were children. Earl, on the other hand, wants to cross something off the list and therefore chooses an easy one: making up for causing a golfer named Scott (Johnny Galecki) believe that he kept playing great games, in order to get him to buy everyone drinks. This proves more complicated than simply buying Scott alcohol, because Scott's obsession with golf cost him his job, girlfriend and apartment. As Earl gets more and more involved in Scott's life, Randy feels like they're never going to get to the fair. When Earl accuses Randy of not helping enough, Randy disappears, making Earl see that Scott isn't the only one with an obsession.
8	8	"Joy's Wedding"	Marc Buckland	Greg Garcia	November 15, 2005	1ALJ07	11.51
Earl's ex-wife marries Darnell Turner (Eddie Steeples); Randy is invited but Earl is not. Doubling the insult, Joy schedules the wedding on Earl's birthday so that all of their friends will be unable to celebrate with him. A drunken Earl crashes the party, accidentally breaking Joy's nose, and adds "ruined Joy's wedding" to his list. While he is trying to help her out on plans for a second, better wedding so she would forgive him, he ends up sleeping with Joy. When Darnell hears this, he is upset at first but then forgives Earl saying, "Hey, you weren't mad when I did it to you."
9	9	"Cost Dad the Election"	Chris Koch	Bobby Bowman	November 22, 2005	1ALJ08	12.20
Earl tries to make up for stealing a car from a girl who only had one leg, and gets beat up by her boyfriend with no legs. When her boyfriend is hitting him with a campaign sign, Earl remembers #4, how he cost his father Carl (Beau Bridges) the last mayoral election by getting himself arrested. Earl visits his bitter father (who now has to put up with planes flying over his house due to losing the election) who doesn't want to run again, but despite his father's wishes Earl signs him up to run again. His father is at first angry at Earl for doing this, but after hearing the public's response, goes ahead with it. However, Earl manages to get himself arrested again and once again Carl loses the election because of this. When Carl arrives to bail Earl out for the first time in six years, Earl finds that, although he didn't manage to cross #4 off the list, he has made a little headway into patching up relations with his dad.
10	10	"White Lie Christmas"	Marc Buckland	Timothy Stack	December 6, 2005	1ALJ09	13.99
Earl has wrecked every Christmas he's spent with Joy, so he, Randy and Catalina try to win a Dodge Neon in a contest wherein they had to keep their hands on said car, in an attempt to get Joy the car for a Christmas present. Earl is eliminated when he goes to shake hands with Randy, so it's up to Catalina and Randy to win the car. Meanwhile Earl decides to make up for wrecking Dodge's and Earl Jr.'s Christmas one year. He then finds out that Joy never told her parents that she and Earl were no longer married, and lied about his absence by saying he was serving in Iraq. She explains to Earl that her father is a racist and would freak if he knew she were married to Darnell. Joy's mother (Brett Butler) has also been struck with rheumatoid arthritis and kidney failure, and needs dialysis and is in a wheelchair. Earl finds out that this is a lie: she has been gambling away the "dialysis" money at an Indian casino. Earl has much work to do if he wants this Christmas to go well. Meanwhile the contest for the Dodge Neon comes down to Randy and Catalina, and when it turns out Catalina has no intention of giving the car to Joy, Randy becomes determined to defeat her.
11	11	"Barn Burner"	Ken Whittingham	Brad Copeland	January 5, 2006	1ALJ10	11.19
Earl goes back to the Camp for Troubled Boys to make up for #164 "Burned down a barn at camp" that got him and his relatives banned from the camp, so that Joy's kids can go. After building an ostrich pen to make up for it, Earl finds out that it was actually Randy who burnt down the barn. This means that Randy is responsible for all of Earl's bad doings after that point, and Earl happily hands over half of the responsibility for the list to him.
12	12	"O Karma, Where Art Thou?"	Michael Fresco	Barbie Adler	January 12, 2006	1ALJ12	12.49
Number 202: "Stole a wallet from a guy at the gas station." Earl gives back a wallet he stole, along with the $1000 that was in it. Earl finds out that the guy was going to use the money for his honeymoon, and now that he has the money, his wife wants to go on a real honeymoon. Since the guy can't get time off from work, Earl volunteers to fill in for him at a fast-food restaurant. The boss, Mr. Patrick (Jon Favreau), turns out to be a jerk who steals money from work, treats his employees with no respect, and cheats on his wife, but Earl can't understand why a guy like that has a good job, nice house, many friends, and a hot wife. Earl has had it with his new boss and when he embarrasses Earl with a balloon in front of children, Earl can't keep his cool any longer. He punches him in the face, causing the police to be called. And that's when Karma starts to kick in, causing the boss to lose his wife and sending him to prison for the stolen money. Earl realizes what he has done, though Randy explains that "karma doesn't have fists" and the guy who returns from his honeymoon becomes the new manager and his workmates all get a raise.
13	13	"Stole P's HD Cart"	Chris Koch	J.B. Cook	January 19, 2006	1ALJ14	10.78
Number 159: After Earl returns a hot dog cart that he and Ralph stole, his efforts are undone when Ralph, working for the competition, sets fire to the cart. Earl sets off to get the money to replace the cart from the competition, but that's harder than it sounds.
14	14	"Monkeys in Space"	Marc Buckland	Greg Garcia	January 26, 2006	1ALJ13	10.45
Number 18: "Told an inappropriate story at Hank Lange's birthday party." Earl must work fast, before Hank gets shipped off to the state penitentiary. Unfortunately, Hank has a rather odd list of requests that Earl must fulfill. Earl is required to obtain various items and visit Hank in prison before visit-hours end. Meanwhile, Randy looks for a job.
15	15	"Something to Live For"	Marc Buckland	Kat Likkel & John Hoberg	February 2, 2006	1ALJ15	10.60
Earl's having car trouble, and sees it as a sign to make up for "Sucked gas out of a hose." (#62). It turns out that by stealing the gas he prevented a suicide. The guy is still suicidal, so Earl sets out to help him find a reason to live.
16	16	"The Professor"	Marc Buckland	Danielle Sanchez-Witzel	February 9, 2006	1ALJ11	10.20
While Earl and Randy are trying to return a laptop they stole, they accidentally knock over a bus stop sign. Earl promises to fix the sign, but gets sidetracked by the laptop's owner, the beautiful college professor Alex Meyers (Christine Taylor). Alex takes an interest in Earl and his List, and they begin dating. Earl soon notices that he is the target of bad accidents and random acts of violence, and remembers that he hasn't fixed the bus stop sign yet, and Karma is punishing him. Meanwhile, Randy has taken an interest in college life and becoming a frat boy.
17	17	"Didn't Pay Taxes"	Craig Zisk	Michael Pennie	March 2, 2006	1ALJ16	11.27
Earl finds a check from an old odd job he did, and feels he cheated the government because he never paid taxes. When he finds out the government does not want his money, he tries to find unorthodox ways of repaying his debt. He and Randy trespass on a water tower to get the government to notice them, but no one notices. When a plane flies by, they jump up and down to get its attention but fall through the roof. They are saved by the government, after which Earl is able to pay back the government via the assessed fine.
18	18	"Dad's Car"	Chris Koch	Brad Copeland & Barbara Feldman	March 16, 2006	1ALJ18	10.59
While trying to make up for Number 266, "Never gave Mom a good Mother's Day", Earl and Randy watch some old home movies that remind Carl of Number 108: "Lost Dad's Mustang." Although Earl told his dad that the car went into a lake, he had really lost it from a street race. Earl manages to get the car back, only to find out that his dad was planning to give him the Mustang when he turned 16 – leaving Earl in the confusing position of having to cross himself off the list.
19	19	"Y2K"	Marc Buckland	Hilary Winston	March 23, 2006	1ALJ19	11.31
Earl goes to make up for #24, "stole a ticket wheel." About six years ago, Crab Man tells Earl, Joy, Randy, Donny that Y2K was going to happen and that the world might end, so they decide not to buy their items at the Bargain Bag store and loot them later. At midnight, the power goes off, and the gang freak out when they hear gunshots (actually fireworks). The next morning they find the streets are empty (the entire town is having a parade), so they hide out at Bargain Bag. They each take different sections of the store, which turns everyone against each other. The episode also follows Catalina's journey sneaking into America.
20	20	"Boogeyman"	Eyal Gordin	Vali Chandrasekaran	March 30, 2006	1ALJ20	9.90
Earl and the gang tried to rob a house, but the owners returned. Earl ends up stuck hiding in a kid's bedroom under the bed. When he tried to sneak out the kid mistook him for the boogeyman and has since been afraid of the dark. Earl tries to make up for this mistake. After helping the boy, he thinks that Earl cares about him more than his own father and wants to live with him, then Earl is accused of kidnapping the little boy.
21	21	"The Bounty Hunter"	Marc Buckland	Hunter Covington	April 6, 2006	1ALJ17	10.21
Before he was tricked into marrying Joy, Earl had been dating Jessie (Juliette Lewis), a clerk at a bail bonds company. When Jessie objected to being dumped, Joy knocked out her two front teeth. Jessie seeks revenge by becoming a bounty hunter. Joy hides from Jessie at an abandoned caravan in which Earl and she "own" but Jessie finds her and they fight but Joy knocks out her front teeth again.
22	22	"Stole a Badge"	Marc Buckland	Victor Fresco	April 27, 2006	1ALJ22	9.05
Earl tackles #127, "Stole a badge from a police officer". Earl finds that the officer got demoted to the worst police post because of him. Earl now has to make it up to the officer by getting him promoted.
23	23	"BB"	Victor Nelli, Jr.	Kat Likkel & John Hoberg	May 4, 2006	1ALJ21	8.80
Earl goes down to the courthouse to pay some tickets and meets Gwen Waters, a woman he shot with a BB when he was young (#147).
24	24	"Number One"	Greg Garcia	Greg Garcia	May 11, 2006	1ALJ23	9.35
Earl allows Darnell to pick his next list item and Darnell picks #1, the last bad thing Earl did before finding karma: "Stole $10 from a guy at the Camden Market", which he used to buy his winning lottery ticket. Earl discovers that the guy, named Paul, was planning to buy a lottery ticket and as it would have won the $100,000 Earl feels he has to hand over the money (which is short $5,000) to Paul which he does. Now Earl has to continue doing the list despite being completely broke, hoping karma will eventually help him out. When Earl starts handing over any money he gets his hands on to Paul to make up for the $5,000 shortfall, Randy reaches breaking point with both Earl and the list.

== Reception ==
The series premiered on September 20, 2005, at 9:00 p.m. (ET/PT), and drew in 14.9 million viewers in the United States, earning a 6.6 rating. By the airing of the third episode it was apparent that My Name Is Earl was the highest rated of NBC's new fall offerings, and a full season (22 episodes) was ordered. In its first month, it was also the highest rated new sitcom of the season to air on any network and was the highest rated sitcom on any network in the 18–49-year-old demographic.

Metacritic gave the first season a weighted average score of 77 out of 100 based on 30 reviews, indicating "generally favorable" reviews. Other reviews were mainly good.

=== Awards and nominations ===
Jason Lee was nominated for the Golden Globes and the Screen Actors Guild award both for best actor in a comedy television series. The series was nominated for the 2006 Golden Globes for best comedy television series. Gregory Thomas Garcia won the 2005/06 Emmy Award for Outstanding Writing for a Comedy Series.
