= My Name Is Earl season 4 =

My Name Is Earl
- Season 4
- DVD cover
- Showrunner: Greg Garcia
- No. of episodes: 27

Release
- Original network: NBC
- Original release: September 25, 2008 – May 14, 2009

Season chronology
- ← Previous; Season 3

The fourth and final season of My Name Is Earl originally aired from September 25, 2008, to May 14, 2009, on NBC. It consisted of 27 episodes.

The season (and the series) ends with a cliff-hanger that was to be resolved in season 5. However, the series was cancelled unexpectedly, and so it remains unresolved.

== Main cast ==
- Jason Lee as Earl Hickey
- Ethan Suplee as Randy Hickey
- Jaime Pressly as Joy Darville Turner
- Eddie Steeples as Darnell Turner
- Nadine Velazquez as Catalina

== Episodes ==
Season 4 premiered on September 25, 2008. Greg Garcia said in a press interview that season 4 would have Earl get back to doing things on the list since season 3 had Earl go through prison, coma, and relationships.

List of My Name Is Earl season 4 episodes
No. overall	No. in season	Title	Directed by	Written by (Note: In the Writers Guild of America screenwriting credit system, an ampersand (&) is used to denote writers who worked together as a team, while the word "and" refers to writers who worked on the same teleplay independently.)	Original release date	Prod. code	U.S. viewers (millions)
70	1	"The Magic Hour"	Eyal Gordin	Timothy Stack	September 25, 2008	4ALJ03	6.40
While Joy creates Make-A-Wish T-shirts so her boys can line jump at the grand opening of an amusement park, Earl remembers when he stole a pony from a boy named Buddy whose Make-A-Wish dream was to ride it in a parade. when Earl goes to make amends with Buddy's parents, he discovers that Buddy (Seth Green) is still alive. Buddy does not want a pony, but he wants Earl's help to produce a sci-fi action film called 2 The Max. With Buddy as the title character, they cast Randy as the president, Joy and Patty as assistants, Catalina as a terrorist, and other townsfolk for other parts. Although Randy turns out to be a good actor, everyone gets tired of Buddy's perfectionistic directing, and they eventually quit. Buddy tells Earl to throw him a premiere in two weeks while he edits and finishes the film. On the big night, everyone turns up, except Buddy. His mother tells Earl that Buddy had finally died of his terminal illness (it is revealed that whenever Buddy was storming off the set, he was actually getting some treatments). Earl wants to tell everyone of Buddy's death after the screening, but finds that Buddy used the movie to help himself achieve many of his dreams. As well as crossing Buddy off his list, Earl also finds the movie to have inspired many others to follow their own dreams.
71	2	"Monkeys Take a Bath"	Greg Garcia	Greg Garcia	September 25, 2008	4ALJ04	6.40
Earl and Randy try to make amends for pranking their childhood neighbors, the Clarks. But when they discover more skeletons in the closet than they had expected, the brothers find themselves needing to sort out some family issues between their parents, turns out Earl and Randy's Mom slept with Clark Clark. Meanwhile, Joy buys a marble game from the Hickeys' garage sale, claiming Willie the One-Eyed Mailman's glass eye in the process. Note: This episode aired as the second half-hour with "The Magic Hour" as the season premiere.
72	3	"Joy in a Bubble"	Michael Fresco	Jessica Goldstein & Chrissy Pietrosh	October 2, 2008	4ALJ05	6.72
Earl's attempt to give Joy the hot tub she's always wanted backfires as Joy contracts a rare flesh-eating infection on her big toe, and is forced to stay quarantined in a make-shift bubble part of the trailer. While she is out of commission, Earl must take care of Joy's everyday activities such as learning the gossip from the ladies at the hair salon, shopping for meat out of a guy's trunk, and protesting the ice cream cart vendor's sales. Earl is concerned the kids were having problems making friends when he sees they were not invited to a birthday party, but later discovers that it's because of Joy's bad behavior and not the kids.
73	4	"Stole an RV"	Chris Koch	Kat Likkel & John Hoberg	October 2, 2008	4ALJ02	6.72
To cross Jerry (Jerry Van Dyke) off of his list, Earl can't just return the RV he stole, mostly because Randy had blown it up. Earl and Randy visit Jerry and discover he has lost all will to live until they restore him by bringing back the keepsakes he had in his trailer. Jerry then becomes highly motivated to get back one more keepsake: to cut off the ear of his army squad mate Joel (John Amos) as revenge for being ditched during a battle in the Korean War. Meanwhile, Joy encounters the legendary "pigsquatch" in the trailer park. She tries to capture it in order to make some money as a sideshow exhibit, but the pig dies from a drug overdose and they are unable to move it.
74	5	"Sweet Johnny"	Eyal Gordin	Kat Likkel & John Hoberg	October 9, 2008	4ALJ06	7.17
Earl decides it's time to make it up to local stunt man Sweet Johnny (David Arquette) for sleeping with his girlfriend. When Earl finds Sweet Johnny, he discovers Johnny has an amnesia in which he forgets everything that happened that day, and has been planning to do a stunt involving tying balloons to a lawn chair. Meanwhile, after being carjacked, Joy buys a gun but Darnell does not approve because of her disregard of gun safety.
75	6	"We've Got Spirit"	Eyal Gordin	Hilary Winston	October 16, 2008	4ALJ01	6.72
Earl wants to take Kenny to attend a cheerleading camp, only to find out that the person who really wanted to become a male cheerleader was not Kenny but Randy. They register for camp, where they discover part of the instructor Kimmy (Jenna Elfman)'s face was ruined by a wild badger, and that they are allocated to a squad by town among a motley crew of girls who have always finished last in everything. Earl and Randy work hard to represent Camden, but the squad hits a setback when Kimmy tells them that Earl and Randy cannot be in the squad. Meanwhile, Joy is upset that her son Dodge thinks of Catalina as beautiful, and tries to make herself look more glamorous to him, much to Darnell's chagrin.
76	7	"Quit Your Snitchin'"	Chris Koch	Matt Ward	October 23, 2008	4ALJ07	6.39
Earl tries to surprise Randy by giving him a Ford Ranchero, but it is stolen. Earl tries to get it back, but the thieves think Earl has crossed over from being a crook to being a citizen / victim, so he is no longer covered by the criminal code of ethics of not stealing from each other. Earl struggles with the idea of going to the police, despite Joy's protests that snitches are the lowest of the low. When he does, he ends up being labelled as a snitch everywhere he goes, until he eventually decides to fight fire with fire.
77	8	"Little Bad Voodoo Brother"	Chris Koch	Alan Kirschenbaum	October 30, 2008	4ALJ10	6.27
While Earl is busy planning a Halloween party for Dodge and Earl Jr., Randy wants to be a big brother mentor. He takes on Catalina's visiting nephew O-Scar under his wing, but when O-Scar is caught stealing tips, Randy tries his best to confront him and tells him to return the money. The boy then appears to go into some sort of trance, which Randy takes to be voodoo, especially when he make dolls. Earl tries to convince Randy and O-Scar that voodoo is fake, and that karma is the real force behind things. After the nephew steals some of Joy's hair, Joy leads the locals in a mob intent on getting their hands on him. Randy and Earl have no choice but to defend the boy from the clutches of the mob.
78	9	"Sold a Guy a Lemon Car"	John Putch	Michael Pennie	November 6, 2008	4ALJ08	6.70
A mysterious man named Lloyd (Courtney Gains) moves next door to Earl and Randy, and makes a lot of noise at night building something. Earl and Randy think Lloyd might be a terrorist, and realize it is the same guy to whom they had sold a lemon car. Lloyd had since resold the lemon to another person, and it was repeatedly sold to other suckers. Lloyd loses faith in humanity, thinking they are all scum, so Earl must convince him otherwise before he activates the bomb. Meanwhile, Joy becomes obsessed with winning a science fair so that she can buy a necklace designed by Jane Seymour with the $500 prize money.
79	10	"Earl and Joy's Anniversary"	Michael Fresco	Danielle Sanchez-Witzel	November 13, 2008	4ALJ11	7.05
When Earl works on repairing the hole in the bar at the Crab Shack, he recalls how he had ruined his and Joy's first wedding anniversary. Randy had eaten the wedding cake, and later throws a surprise party on behalf of Earl where he had inadvertently invited Joy's previous sexual partners in her little black book instead of her friends. One of the said ex's was Earl's more successful and handsome cousin Blake (Jason Priestley), who makes Earl feel less than adequate as a husband. Killer bees invade Camden, locking down the Crab Shack, and trapping Darnell, Catalina, Patty and Kenny in a phone booth.
80	11	"Nature's Game Show"	Eyal Gordin	Hunter Covington	November 20, 2008	4ALJ12	6.61
A series of tornadoes hit Camden County, causing Earl to lose his list, and the townsfolk scrambling to take loose items off the ground according to Finders, keepers. Catalina, who was upset about the rule, uses a found gun to get her stuff back and a bunch of everything else, but when the next tornado knocks the gun out of her hand with a Bible, she has a religious awakening, as well as Patty the daytime hooker. Randy, who survived being hurled from a boat onto the motel roof, wants to fly during the next tornado, thinking he is invincible. Meanwhile, Darnell cannot stand Joy's arguing, but Joy takes offense when Darnell tells her that he is smarter than her.
81	12	"Reading Is a Fundamental Case"	Michael Fresco	Mike Mariano	December 4, 2008	4ALJ09	6.13
While reading to children, Earl reminisces about a recent list item that he and Randy righted. It all began when Earl found his old friend Raynard (Ewen Bremner) living in the wild and keeping company with a raccoon. The episode is dedicated to Garcia's newborn son Gump in the Amigos de Garcia Productions logo stating: "Happy Birthday, Gump!"
82	13	"Orphan Earl"	Marc Buckland	Michael Shipley	December 11, 2008	4ALJ13	6.55
Earl discovers that Joy has continued a holiday scam they started years before, and has expanded the scam to include her friends.
83	14	"Got the Babysitter Pregnant"	Mike Mariano	Story by : Patrick McCarthy & Erika Kaestle & Vali Chandrasekaran; Teleplay by : Vali Chandrasekaran	January 8, 2009	4ALJ14	5.60
After having his heart broken by the babysitter, a young Earl goes to drastic measures to make sure she and her boyfriend pay the ultimate price. Now older and wiser, Earl decides it's time to cross them off his list. When he finds the couple and their live-in, obnoxious, grown son, he believes karma wants him to help the freeloader learn how to make it on his own. But when Earl finds that the lesson in tough love also applies to Randy, he realizes the difficulty in kicking someone out of the nest. Meanwhile, Joy struggles to tell Darnell that she lost his beloved pet turtle.
84	15	"Darnell Outed"	Ralph Greene	Ralph Greene	January 15, 2009	4ALJ15	5.99
85	16	"Darnell Outed"	Ralph Greene	Story by : Alan Kirschenbaum & Jessica Goldstein & Chrissy Pietrosh; Teleplay by : Hunter Covington & Matt Ward	January 22, 2009	4ALJ16	6.59
When auditions for Erik Estrada's new competition show Estrada or Nada come to Camden, Earl encourages Joy to go for her childhood dream of becoming famous and try out, thus allowing him to cross an item off his list, as he had screwed up her chance of being on Fear Factor by accidentally destroying her audition tape. Joy, initially reluctant, steals Randy's audition spot, but makes a fool of herself. Her crazy antics are a cause for concern when Darnell receives a startling phone call. After losing his Witness Protection cover, Darnell must pack up the family and they have to assume a new identity, as the Jewish "Rosenstein" family. Earl and Randy try to mail themselves to Darnell's forwarding address, only to discover that the mail goes to an undisclosed dumpster. There they find a letter from Estrada or Nada inviting Joy back to the show if she can get enough text message votes by phone.
86	17	"Randy's List Item"	Paul Burke Pedreira	Bobby Bowman	February 5, 2009	4ALJ19	6.28
When Randy wins $250. from a scratcher lottery ticket, and is hit by a bike, sending the ticket blowing away, he thinks it is Karma, and gets inspired to make his own List like Earl's. One of the items coincides with an item from Earl's list, where they are to make amends for ruining a friendship with former trailer park neighbor Zeke and his brother Arlo. Earl and Zeke had done a lot of things together, mainly to win T-shirts, but Randy got jealous and tricked Earl into thinking Zeke stole his Andrew Dice Clay belt buckle, causing Earl to burn the T-shirts. After meeting Zeke, Earl is able to be friends with him again, and they do more activities together, but Arlo gets upset and burns the shirts. Randy comes up with an idea to have Zeke and Arlo be on good terms again. Meanwhile, Joy, Darnell and their family are relocated multiple times in the witness protection program, mainly because Joy is not satisfied with the living conditions.
87	18	"Friends with Benefits"	Allison Liddi-Brown	Jessica Goldstein & Chrissy Pietrosh	February 12, 2009	4ALJ17	6.40
When Mr. Turtle finds his way home after being lost, Earl sets off to return him to Darnell, who now lives in an upscale community with his family, thanks to Witness Protection. Meanwhile, adjusting to her new wealthy lifestyle proves difficult when Joy struggles to fit in with her trophy-wife neighbors. Back in Camden, Randy unwittingly shares a bed with a guy named Jim, who has a crush on him. Guest stars Morgan Fairchild as Carol and Joan Van Ark as Janine, two of Joy's neighbors.
88	19	"My Name Is Alias"	Eyal Gordin	Matthew W. Thompson	February 19, 2009	4ALJ18	6.79
Darnell's father (Danny Glover) arrives in Camden claiming he needs to make amends with his son. Earl and Randy smell trouble and go to warn Joy and Darnell. Unfortunately, trouble follows them there and the family reunion results in Darnell and his dad going on one last super-secret, undercover operation.
89	20	"Chaz Dalton's Space Academy"	Marc Buckland	Hilary Winston	March 5, 2009	4ALJ20	5.46
Earl returns to a space camp in order to make up for ruining the space suit that his childhood hero Chaz Dalton wore in space. He finds that Chaz has been treating the kids well, so when he goes to a space launch facility to try to get a replacement suit, he sees a picture of Chaz Dalton and realizes that his childhood hero is not the same person. He recruits the real Chaz Dalton to take over the camp, but the real Chaz has become a disoriented mess, and is no good with kids. Meanwhile, Darnell gets in touch with his old friends using a social networking website called BuddyBook, but when Joy tries it out, she is unable to get any friends from the people she knows.
90	21	"Witch Lady"	Eyal Gordin	Michael Shipley & Matt Ward	March 19, 2009	4ALJ21	6.43
Earl tries to atone to a woman known as the Crazy Witch Lady (Betty White) whom he had harassed and mocked many kids when he was a kid. He has tea with her, but then finds himself abducted by the lady and placed in her basement. Soon Randy is captured and the others including Joy, Darnell, Catalina, Kenny, Stuart, and Patty. Also, Joy tries to prove that she has a nice side.
91	22	"Pinky"	Greg Garcia	Greg Garcia	March 26, 2009	4ALJ22	5.89
Earl helps Randy find his first love, a girl with pink hair called Pinky. Randy learns Earl had come between them all those years ago, lying to Pinky by writing a note saying that Skipper (Randy) had broken up with her. They agree to reunite on a bridge, but Randy discovers that Pinky is actually Joy.
92	23	"Bullies"	Eyal Gordin	Vali Chandrasekaran & Hunter Covington	April 16, 2009	4ALJ23	5.36
Earl attempts to cross off another list item for bullying a classmate from when he was briefly in Catholic school, Wally Panzer (Matthew Willig), whom Earl dubbed "Pansy." Wally has since become a very strong gym rat, so Earl, under the alias Cliff, agrees to help him to re-enter the Mr. Camden bodybuilding competition. Meanwhile, Randy takes drastic measures to avoid Joy's bullying, trying out shark adrenaline; however, he ends up going crazy when he injects the entire vial. He reveals that Cliff is Earl, and then goes on a rampage, fighting Wally, and then going after joy.
93	24	"Gospel"	Ken Whittingham	Mike Mariano & Deweyne Lamar Lee	April 23, 2009	4ALJ24	5.54
Earl returns a stolen church organ to Reverend Greene (Faizon Love), a former "gangsta" who went by the nickname "Hash Brown". At first, Reverend Greene forgives Earl, but they discover that Earl had wronged Greene multiple times on the list. During a church service where Earl was a guest, Greene learns that Earl had slept with his wife, and reverts to being his thug Hash Brown ways. Meanwhile, a drunken Joy runs into Catalina with a riding mower and traps her in a tool shed. When Catalina threatens to contact the cops, Joy makes it an abduction and turns to Darnell, who concludes that Catalina should be killed.
94	25	"Inside Probe"	Greg Garcia	Greg Garcia	April 30, 2009	4ALJ26	5.16
95	26	"Inside Probe"	Greg Garcia	Michael Pennie & Timothy Stack	May 7, 2009	4ALJ27	6.59
An episode of the news show Inside Probe, guest hosted by Geraldo Rivera, airs on television after being held for eight years because of Darnell's witness protection. The show focuses on the mysterious disappearance of the Crab Shack's owner Ernie Belcher, and goes into the background of Camden 's most notorious crooks (Earl and his friends). Earl and Randy become prime suspects in the murder of Ernie Belcher, and even get Randy to confess that they did it, but race car driver Michael Waltrip provides them a solid alibi. The Inside Probe investigation continues as other speculations arise including people seeing a bright light in the sky, suggesting alien abduction. They look into the history of Camden in the American Civil War where they had formed an independent country called The Central. They also look into a fetish video side business that Ernie had been involved in. Eventually, they discover that Ernie had been videotaping women in the Crab Shack's ladies' restroom, and had fallen into the deep freshly laid concrete floor in a freak accident, leaving only his nose to be exposed like a doorstop.
96	27	"Dodge's Dad"	Chris Koch	Alan Kirschenbaum & Danielle Sanchez-Witzel	May 14, 2009	4ALJ25	4.84
After being reminded of ruining Dodge's Career Day a few years earlier, Earl agrees to appear again. Awkward questions remind Earl that Dodge doesn't know that Earl isn't his natural father. Under pressure, Joy reveals that Little Chubby – the richest businessman in Camden – is Dodge's real dad. Earl tries to get Little Chubby to do his duty to Dodge; Little Chubby responds to Earl's efforts by freezing his bank account and having him evicted from the motel. Eventually a DNA test reveals that Dodge's father is not Little Chubby but Earl himself: the conception occurred during a Halloween party, at which Earl and Little Chubby wore similar costumes. Even more surprising is that Darnell isn't Earl Jr's father, meaning Joy previously had another affair.
