= My Name Is Earl season 3 =

My Name Is Earl
- Season 3
- DVD cover
- Showrunner: Greg Garcia
- No. of episodes: 22

Release
- Original network: NBC
- Original release: September 27, 2007 – May 15, 2008

Season chronology
- ← Previous; Season 2 Next → Season 4

The third season of My Name Is Earl originally aired from September 27, 2007, to May 15, 2008, on NBC. Originally, 25 episodes were planned for the season, but due to the 2007-2008 WGA strike, there were only 22 episodes.

== Main cast ==
- Jason Lee as Earl Hickey
- Ethan Suplee as Randy Hickey
- Jaime Pressly as Joy Darville Turner
- Eddie Steeples as Darnell Turner
- Nadine Velazquez as Catalina

== Episodes ==
List of My Name Is Earl season 3 episodes
No. overall	No. in season	Title	Directed by	Written by (Note: In the Writers Guild of America screenwriting credit system, an ampersand (&) is used to denote writers who worked together as a team, while the word "and" refers to writers who worked on the same teleplay independently.)	Original release date	Prod. code	U.S. viewers (millions)
48	1	"My Name Is Inmate #28301-016"	Michael Fresco	Michael Pennie	September 27, 2007	3ALJ01	8.66
49	2	"My Name Is Inmate #28301-016"	Michael Fresco	Kat Likkel & John Hoberg	September 27, 2007	3ALJ02	8.66
Earl Hickey is initially placed in the same cell as Ralph Mariano, but Ralph later escapes, leaving a big hole, and forcing Earl to have to live in the general prisoners' quarters. He reunites with friend and fellow prisoner Sonny, who suggests that he try to stay invisible as possible in prison. This is made harder when he discovers that someone on his list named Glen is in prison and is ready to kill him. Meanwhile Randy is having a hard time living without Earl. Seeing that Joy is eager to repay Earl for going to prison in her place, he requests that she and Darnell take Randy in. After waiting for Glen to tire out from killing him, Earl asks Glen what he wants, at which Glen asks for Earl to make him a shiv. Earl does so but he then gets stabbed by the shiv. Earl finds that the key to surviving in prison is not to be anonymous like Sonny but to be himself. He learns that Glen has purposely sabotaged his own chances of getting out of prison when his sentence was up, so Earl then helps Glen do something he could not do before: earn his final scout badges. Joy tries to get Randy to start thinking for himself instead of relying on Earl to help him through life.
50	3	"The Gangs of Camden County"	Michael Fresco	Victor Fresco	October 4, 2007	3ALJ05	7.98
Warden Jerry Hazelwood offers a reduction of his sentence if he can resolve the fighting between the rival Black and Latino gangs. Picking up from an observation of how Earl, Joy and Darnell were able to resolve a problem, he tries to apply it to the leaders of the two gangs who had been placed in solitary confinement together. Earl is shocked to find the two gang leaders have become lovers. Meanwhile, Randy looks for ways to join Earl in prison and ends up applying to be a warden.
51	4	"The Frank Factor"	Greg Garcia	Greg Garcia	October 11, 2007	3ALJ04	7.76
Earl reunites with Frank, an old friend and now fellow inmate. The episode flashes back to when Earl and Randy left their parents' home and looked for a place to live, eventually renting the kitchen space in Frank's trailer. After Patty's client shows off a fancy watch, Earl and Randy go to steal it, only to find that Frank and his housemate Paco are also after it. The four agree to split the proceeds, and then plan a larger-scale robbery of an Indian casino with guns. Meanwhile, Joy, who had become visibly pregnant with her first child, had also been looking for a place to stay as well as a sugar daddy, considering local celebrity TV's Tim Stack. She later gets Earl drunk and they go to Las Vegas for a shotgun wedding, while Randy is distracted from a cartoon marathon. Catalina, who was prompted by Paco, arrives in Camden County and meets Darnell who had just gotten out of the FBI van to begin his new identity under the witness protection program. Frank and Paco have a successful robbery, using Howie Mandel as a hostage, but Paco gets distracted from seeing Catalina on the road and crashes into the FBI van. With Frank headed to prison, Earl, Joy, and Randy end up living at his trailer and use his El Camino.
52	5	"Creative Writing"	Chris Koch	Bobby Bowman	October 18, 2007	3ALJ03	7.25
The prison holds a class for creative writing. Earl can't think of anything to write, when he looks into his imagination, he only sees the gymnast that Sonny had beaten up. The episode follows the stories that were written by the other main cast members. Randy writes about being a superhero working with a driving chimpanzee and H.R. Pufnstuf. Joy writes a story about where she is a supermom and what happens to kids who don't do their homework. Darnell writes up lyrics for an R&B music video at the Crab Shack. Catalina writes a script for a telenovela called Catalina, Woman of 1000 Tears. Earl eventually writes about the good times hanging out with his friends at the Crab Shack.
53	6	"Frank's Girl"	Eyal Gordin	Danielle Sanchez-Witzel	October 25, 2007	3ALJ06	8.20
Earl feels guilty when Frank's girlfriend, Billie Cunningham breaks up with him because he was stuck in solitary confinement during their conjugal visit and that Earl had learned of Frank's nude photo of her. Earl and Frank try video blind dating, but Earl ends up with a transgender woman and Frank almost gives his date a belly-button piercing. Earl has Frank publicly apologize to Billie, at which Billie agrees to meet with him again. However, when Earl learns that Billie has been getting her life together and would be putting her future in jeopardy, he has to convince Frank to break up with her. Joy tries to get revenge on Catalina who had snapped a picture of her on the toilet.
54	7	"Our Other 'Cops' Is On!"	Ken Whittingham	Timothy Stack	November 1, 2007	3ALJ08	7.30
55	8	"Our Other 'Cops' Is On!"	Ken Whittingham	Vali Chandrasekaran	November 1, 2007	3ALJ09	7.30
This was an hour-long episode. Unable to change the channel or turn off the TV at the prison common area, Randy finds that another episode of Cops involving the folks in Camden County is being broadcast. The show takes place on the Fourth of July 2002, where many of the people in the country have been reacting to the 9/11 attacks. Earl and Randy are tasked by Joy to make money at the Fourth of July Fair. Officer Daniels picks up Kenny James for a ride-along with a cop. Other officers follow arguments between Joy and her Sikh neighbor. Tim Stack gets drunk at Club Chubby, and Catalina gets into a catfight with another dancer. Things get worse when Daniels announces that he has $50,000 worth of surveillance equipment that he is doing to demonstrate, only for it and the fireworks to be stolen by Earl and Randy.
56	9	"Randy in Charge (...Of Our Days and Our Nights)"	Eyal Gordin	Mike Mariano	November 8, 2007	3ALJ10	7.66
Jerry offers Earl five weeks off his prison sentence if he creates a Scared Straight! program: Earl and Randy are to take convicts to the schools to give talks designed to steer kids away from crime. Jerry also wants the talks to include eco-friendly messages. During the preparations, Earl suggests that Randy might not be fit for the job of prison guard. After the brothers quarrel over who really is in charge, Randy leaves Earl at the prison and takes the other inmates for the presentation. Afterwards, Randy wants to take them for ice cream, having two of the inmates go and buy the food, but when Frank tells Randy that it's a bad idea, Randy goes and checks on the two (who have bought the ice cream) but when they head back, Frank has escaped. Meanwhile, Joy is pressured by her sister Liberty to have a natural childbirth, so she tries to find ways to induce that before giving up and heading to the hospital to be induced.
57	10	"Midnight Bun"	Eyal Gordin	Hilary Winston	November 15, 2007	3ALJ11	8.01
Joy and Darnell head to the hospital where they are preparing for the birth, and find that the facility has a nice massage treatment center. But Liberty and Ray Ray arrive and insist on natural delivery. Jerry gives Earl and Randy 48 hours to find Frank and to do so without attracting attention. Frank goes back to the trailer where he has hidden a stash of cash, so Earl and Randy try to find a way to convince Frank to give up, until Frank pulls a gun out and holds them hostage. Meanwhile, Catalina babysits Joy's children, who learn that Catalina never had a proper childhood.
58	11	"Burn Victim"	Gail Mancuso	Michael Shipley	November 29, 2007	3ALJ12	6.62
After helping Jerry out with numerous tasks, Earl has discovered that his prison term has been reduced to six months and ten days left in jail. Jerry offers to remove six months if Earl can help launch a program that works between the inmate and the victim or victim's family. Earl chooses an inmate whose meth lab had exploded and had burned his parents' house down. The inmate agrees to participate if Earl would throw a prison prom, because he missed his in high school. Earl turns to Joy to help plan the prom, and soon discovers it will cost him the rest of the money he had left from his lottery winnings. Knowing that paying for the prom will earn him his freedom, Earl agrees to give up the rest of his money and the night is a success. But the inmate reneges on the deal and refuses to reconcile with his parents, leading Earl to settle things in a more direct style.
59	12	"Early Release"	Jason Ensler	Jessica Goldstein & Chrissy Pietrosh	December 6, 2007	3ALJ13	7.38
Earl is excited to leave prison early, only to find that the warden Jerry has shredded his early release certificates. Earl confronts Jerry, who offers him a new deal to keep working, but Earl refuses, and is thrown into solitary confinement for sixty days. Earl becomes delirious; he, Frank, and Paco plan an escape with the help of Darnell and Joy posing as a visiting church service.
60	13	"Bad Earl"	Eyal Gordin	Alan Kirschenbaum	January 10, 2008	3ALJ07	7.74
Earl's lifestyle in prison seems to be transitioning to his regular life outside of bars. He's having a hard time adjusting back to normal life and continues to hold a grudge with karma. He has no money left; the motel gives away his room; and as an ex-convict he can find only a demeaning job. A half-hearted attempt to cross an item off the list leads to his humiliation and, upon seeing that Ralph is living a lavish life after conning an elderly woman, he decides there is no karma and refuses to do the list anymore. After Earl slaps Catalina's backside, knocks over Joy and Darnell's trailer and forces Randy to sleep in the car on Christmas Eve (having taken over conning the elderly woman from Ralph), everyone partakes in an intervention on Christmas morning to try to make Earl change his ways. Earl rejects his friends and tries to run from karma, but karma catches up to him in the shape of a car, and Billie.
61	14	"I Won't Die with a Little Help from My Friends"	Marc Buckland	Greg Garcia	April 3, 2008	3ALJ14	7.53
62	15	"I Won't Die with a Little Help from My Friends"	Marc Buckland	Bobby Bowman	April 3, 2008	3ALJ15	7.53
Earl is still lying in the middle of the road next to Billie, both of whom are unconscious after being hit by a car. The accident puts Earl in a coma and takes him to an alternate world in the form of a sitcom. Meanwhile, the paramedic rejects Earl so Randy, Joy, Darnell and Catalina steal an ambulance to get Earl to the hospital. Karma still seems to be getting the better of Earl when the stretcher is lost and becomes stuck to the front of a truck driven by a crazy lady who claims not to know that he is unconscious. Randy and the others get there and "steal" Earl and take him to the hospital. Earl is still in a coma, but the doctors at the hospital refuse to try to pull him out of it. After desperate attempts to wake him up, Randy tracks down a little boy who can cure everything with his finger. The boy refuses to help because he thinks Joy has the devil on her side, so Darnell and Randy try to prove to him that she does not. Meanwhile in the sitcom world, Earl gets a promotion but will have to leave town for good to have it. Has Earl's bad karma gotten the best of him? Will he find the strength to survive his coma? Guest stars Paris Hilton as herself.
63	16	"Stole a Motorcycle"	Eyal Gordin	Kat Likkel & John Hoberg	April 10, 2008	3ALJ16	7.09
Earl is still in a coma, but Randy realizes that each item he completes off Earl's list helps Earl get better. After letting fate pick his next task, Randy gathers Joy and Darnell to help him solve the mystery of a motorcycle stolen from the Teutul family. Randy cannot remember anything about that day because both he and Earl were drunk. He must retrace his steps, with the help of Joy and Darnell, and try to fix the problem before Earl's condition gets worse. Meanwhile, Earl's life in a coma is still in sitcom form and his wife, Billie, is pregnant. Earl and Billie have a baby boy and are very happy. Is this alternate life in Earl's mind his ideal life? Guest stars Paul Teutul, Sr., Paul Teutul, Jr., and Michael Teutul from American Chopper.
64	17	"No Heads and a Duffel Bag"	Michael Fresco	Hunter Covington	April 17, 2008	3ALJ17	6.87
With Earl still in a coma, Randy and Joy continue crossing items off Earl's list to improve his recovery. Earl's parents went on a vacation and left the house to Earl and Randy. Upon returning early from the airport due to a flight delay they found a duffel bag full of marijuana in the house. Earl's dad Carl is very mad and destroys all of it, only to find Earl, Joy and Randy return home with an angry drug dealer holding a gun demanding his entire duffel bag full of weed back. Carl, reluctantly, was left with no other decision than to buy back all the marijuana from the local drug dealer. What will Randy do to amend this situation? Or is this a task that Earl can resolve just by listening to his father?
65	18	"Killerball"	Eyal Gordin	Matt Ward	April 24, 2008	3ALJ18	6.16
Randy decides that putting Earl in long-term care is not the best decision, so he takes care of Earl himself. Joy and Darnell do not approve of Randy's newly adopted responsibility of taking care of his brother, but let it play out for a bit. Randy feels that if they work together to complete tasks off the list, then Earl might recover even faster. Together they tackle the next task off Earl's list. Earl and Randy messed with two kids in the past, handicapped thanks to skydiving gone wrong, and Randy makes up for by having comatose Earl "participate" in a handicapped sport with some fancy remote controls. Meanwhile, Earl and his sitcom world counterparts have suddenly aged into senior citizens, allowing Earl to discover he's living in a fake world and finally emerge from his coma.
66	19	"Love Octagon"	Michael Fresco	Danielle Sanchez-Witzel	May 1, 2008	3ALJ19	6.73
After waking up from a coma, Earl now knew what was important in his life and he was set on going after it. He knew that he had to find Billie, whom he felt karma brought to him to be his soul mate. No one knows where to find Billie and so Earl turned to an unlikely place, Frank. Elsewhere, Darnell and Joy have moved into the Crab Shack, since their trailer is still turned on its side (from the events in "Bad Earl"). The episode is dedicated to one of the show's producers in the Amigos de Garcia Productions logo that states: "Our Amigo Forever!" 1943-2008.
67	20	"Girl Earl"	Eyal Gordin	Ralph Greene	May 8, 2008	3ALJ20	6.06
After karma leads Earl back to Billie, they decide that they were meant to give their relationship a chance. Billie is inspired by Earl's good deeds and creates a karma list of her own. On her list is a competitive grocery bagger Joel (Jon Heder) from whom both Billie and Earl previously stole, so they track him down to make things right. Joel broke his finger and could not compete in bagging anymore. While Billie crosses Joel off her list, Earl feels like he has to do more. Joel has Earl participate in the bagging competition, but Billie breaks Earl's finger.
68	21	"Camdenites"	Michael Fresco	Michael Pennie & Hilary Winston	May 15, 2008	3ALJ21	7.17
69	22	"Camdenites"	Michael Fresco	Michael Pennie & Hilary Winston	May 15, 2008	3ALJ22	7.17
Earl is still questioning karma bringing Billie into his life. With the troubles in their marriage escalating, Earl turns to friends for advice. He realizes the best advice he gets is to follow his dad's example, which was to just work late and spend less time with his wife. In Earl's world, working late meant spending a lot more time devoted to the list. For a while it seemed to really work. Billie grows very annoyed of Earl's karmic list and forces Earl to choose between the list and Billie. When Earl chooses the list, Billie starts to undo all his good deeds by hurting the residents of Camden County. Earl focuses on helping the Camdenites, an Amish-like sect, by convincing one of the young women, Greta, to return to the sect. When Billie hijacks Greta, played by Deborah Ann Woll, (who develops an attraction to Randy), Earl thinks all is lost. But Billie, in an attempt to escape the law, stumbles into the Camdenite compound and joins the religious order. She briefly returns to make amends with Earl, grant him a divorce, and in an act of good karma, gave him the remainder of her insurance settlement amounting to $72,000. With his faith in karma fully restored, Earl reflects afterward that after being sent to prison, rejecting karma and ending up in a coma he is finally back where he belongs.
