= List of My Name Is Earl characters =

The American sitcom television series My Name Is Earl, created by Greg Garcia for NBC, features a variety of characters, most of whom live in the fictional town of Camden and Camden County. The show centers on Earl Hickey (Jason Lee), a small-time crook who after an epiphany involving karma, makes a list of items in which he had done wrong to others, and proceeds to make amends to the people involved. The characters listed include Earl's immediate family, friends and acquaintances, as well as general townsfolk who have appeared over multiple episodes and storylines.

== Main characters ==
=== Earl Hickey ===
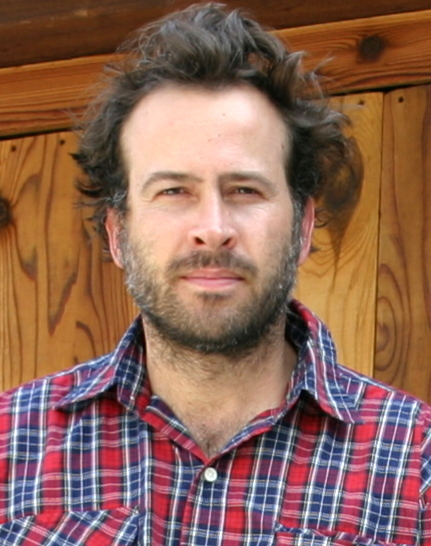
Jason Lee portrayed Earl Hickey on the series

Earl Jehosephat Hickey (played by Jason Lee) (Note: Earl as a kid is played by Noah Crawford.) — the titular and viewpoint character, he has a long history of petty crimes and other repugnant acts of bullying classmates and taking advantage of others. In the opening episode, he wins a lottery scratcher but is immediately hit by a car; during his recovery, he watches a Carson Daly interview where the latter talks about karma, and he realizes he has been a bad person and tries to turn his life around by making a list of all the bad things he has done and doing good deeds to cross them off the list. He discovers that when he does good things he is rewarded by karma, first by getting the lottery ticket back. But when he ignores the list, as especially demonstrated in the episode "The Professor", bad things continue to happen. One of the recurring gags regarding Earl is that he always has his eyes closed when his picture is taken. He has a mustache and tends to wear flannel shirts, often with concert T-shirts from classic rock bands underneath. He is a huge fan of southern rock and heavy metal bands such as AC/DC, Def Leppard, Motörhead, Judas Priest, Creedence Clearwater Revival, Lynyrd Skynyrd, Van Halen, Guns N' Roses, Iron Maiden and Metallica. He drives a 1973 red El Camino that once belonged to his friend Frank: it has a blue driver's side door, found in a tornado. Earl's father Carl intended to name him after himself, but put in an extra loop on his cursive letter "C" on the birth certificate.

In season 4, it is discovered that Earl was always the biological father of Joy's oldest son Dodge. He attended a party dressed as a skeleton and slept with Joy after both were drunk at the time. The series indefinitely ended on a cliffhanger after this.

=== Randy Hickey ===
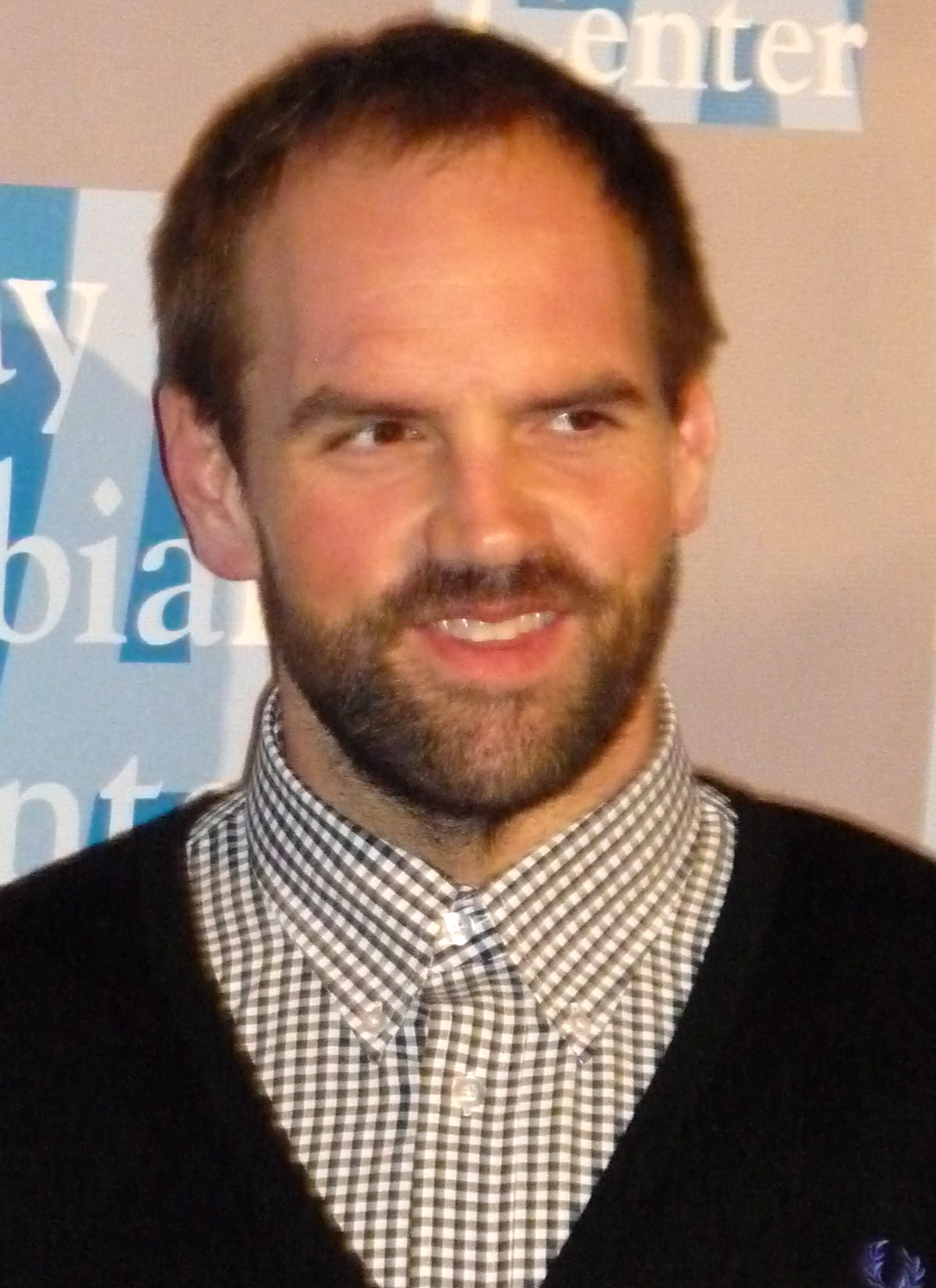
Ethan Suplee portrayed Randy Hickey on the series

Randall Dew Hickey (played by Ethan Suplee) (Note: Randy as a kid is played by Ryan Armstrong.) – Earl's younger brother. He and Earl used to commit a bunch of crimes together, but he goes along with Earl on his list. In "Monkeys in Space", when he tries to get a job, Earl finds that he is unable to fulfill his list item in time until Randy helps him. In the episode "Number One", he breaks down and questions the entire process. His character was initially described as equally nasty and tough but after Earl started working on the list, he becomes naive, childlike, and simplistic. In "Harassed a Reporter" he is upset that the reporter portrayed him as intellectually disabled, but when she mentions that it could be karma, he is happy that karma noticed him and considered him important.

Randy has a crush on Catalina, calling dibs on her when they first met. He dated a woman who liked cats in the episode "Larceny of a Kitty Cat", despite being allergic to them. Although he is afraid of birds, especially chickens, he is willing to forgo that for love, as shown in "South of the Border (Part 1)", and in part 2, they get married at Catalina's village. In the episode "Foreign Exchange Student" he finally tells Catalina he loves her, but Catalina intentionally makes herself repulsive when they consummate the marriage later that night, after which Randy doesn't want to live with her anymore and just keeps it a green card marriage.

In season 3, after finding that he is unable to function independently, he gets a job as a guard at the same state prison so he can hang out with Earl. In the episode "Creative Writing", Earl remarks that a psychologist had called Randy "borderline artistic". In the "Inside Probe" episodes, Geraldo Rivera described him as the town simpleton, mentally disabled, and reveals that he has 77 misdemeanors like his brother.

=== Joy Turner ===
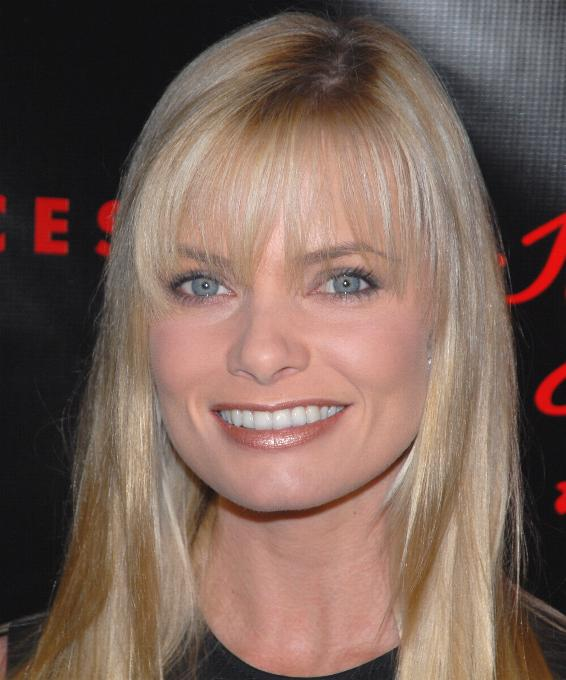
Jaime Pressly portrayed Joy Turner on the series

Joy Farrah Turner (née Darville, also Joy Hickey) (played by Jaime Pressly) is Earl's ex-wife who divorces him in the first episode and then marries his friend, Darnell, during the first season of the series. She is pessimistic, cold-hearted, stubborn and vain. Joy is the mother of two boys, Dodge and Earl Jr. She drives a Subaru BRAT painted with the American flag. Her catchphrases are "Oh, snap!", "What the hell", and she frequently calls both Earl and Randy "Dummy". She is openly scornful of Earl's list, and strongly dislikes Catalina, although she ends up saving her life in the fourth season.

The episodes "The Bounty Hunter" and "Guess Who's Coming Out of Joy" cover parts of Joy's past. When she was pregnant with her first child, she was kicked out of her parents' house in the neighboring town of Nathanville. She looked for a sugar daddy, dating local celebrity TV's Tim Stack briefly. She and her friends get Earl drunk, after which they have a shotgun wedding in Las Vegas and move into a trailer at the Pimmit Hills Trailer Park. She would often go along with Earl, Randy, Ralph, Donny and others on their crime sprees. She has an affair with Darnell but when she becomes pregnant with her second child, she convinces Earl that he is the father. Years later, at the start of the series, she and Earl divorce, but after he signs the papers, he wins the lottery money. Joy then tries some schemes to get her share, but eventually gives up. She then marries Darnell in the episode "Joy's Wedding". Although she is quite selfish and frugal, she cares deeply for her boys.

In the second season, Joy gets in trouble with the law when she was trying to return an entertainment system cabinet and ended up stealing a truck with a store employee in it. Her charges of grand theft auto, kidnapping and assault would count as the third strike, which would put her in prison for life. She is appointed a deaf lawyer (Marlee Matlin), who gets her involved with an addiction recovery group for her anger and also prescribes happy pills. Hoping to evoke sympathy from the jury, Joy agrees to be a surrogate mother for her half-sister Liberty. The trial goes well until Earl's 911 calls are presented. However, Earl then confesses to all the crimes and takes the punishment.

The third season has Joy being pregnant while taking care of Randy until the latter becomes a guard at the prison that Earl is staying. She gives birth to the baby for Liberty and Ray Ray's family. Joy believed throughout the show that Little Chubby was the father of Dodge and Darnell was the father of Earl Jr. It is revealed in "Dodge's Dad" that Earl is the biological father of Dodge, but Earl Jr.'s father is never named because of the shows cancellation.

=== Catalina Aruca ===
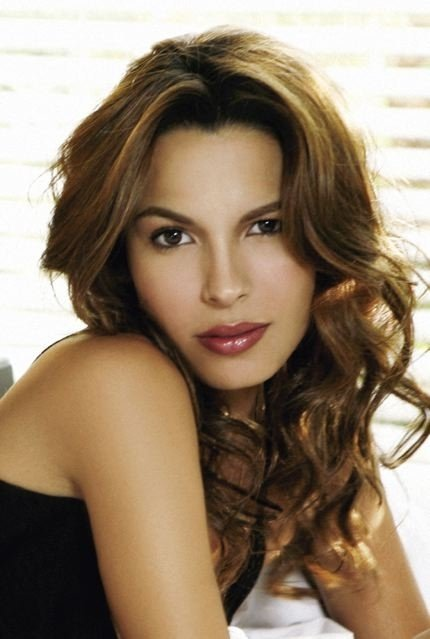
Nadine Velazquez portrayed Catalina Aruca on the series

Catalina Rana Aruca (Note: Catalina's last name is mentioned multiple times in the season 3 "Creative Writing" episode. Her middle name is first mentioned in the season 4 "Inside Probe" episode) (played by Nadine Velazquez) — the beautiful housekeeper at Earl and Randy's motel. Randy has a major crush on Catalina, immediately calling dibs on her when they first met. She was the top dancer at Club Chubby for about a month, where her routine simply consisted of jumping in place to House of Pain's "Jump Around" song, until one of the patrons died, at which she vowed never to dance again. She dislikes Joy, but later returns to Club Chubby in the season 2 episode "Jump for Joy" when she sees how Earl tries hard to make things better. She also helps Earl on one of the items on his list in the episode "Mailbox". Season 2 features a story arc where Catalina is arrested for speeding and deported to her village. When Earl and Randy arrive, she gets news that Earl has agreed to marry her, but Earl lets Randy do it. In the "Foreign Exchange Student" episode, Randy and Catalina rent an apartment in order to keep up appearances, but when Randy tells her he loves her, Catalina tells Earl she only wants to be friends with Randy. She takes actions to be as physically repulsive as possible when Randy and she consummate their marriage, but afterwards regrets it as she finds that Randy is the best lover she's had. In the season 3 episode "Love Octagon", she declares that she is a new lesbian, but her attempts to woo Billie Cunningham fail. However, she reconciles with her former boyfriend Paco who previously tried to catch her attention in the years past but finally caught her.

Catalina was born in the small town of Guadalatucky, a Latin American village stricken with violence and poverty. She was prompted by her lover Paco to come to America. She is placed in a crate and inside a car. In the season 4 flashback episode, "Earl and Joy's Anniversary", when she was trapped in the phone booth with some Africanized bees outside, she said she was from La Paz, and lost her virginity in a foursome with Darnell, Patty, and Kenny. She occasionally wires money to her family in the village. In the episode "Kept a Guy Locked in a Truck", it is revealed she lives in a shared laundry room at the motel.

In some episodes, Catalina breaks the fourth wall with her Spanish lines: In the episode "Barn Burner", she thanks the Latino audience for turning in every week; In the episode "Number One", her quipping at Joy translates to thanking the audience and hoping they will see them next fall; In the episode "Robbed a Stoner Blind", from the second season, she explains during Randy's claymation hallucination of her how the animation was originally going to be more complex but because of budget constraints they simply made her dance around.

=== Darnell Turner ===
Darnell Turner (played by Eddie Steeples), Joy's husband, is still one of Earl's best friends despite apparently impregnating Earl's then-wife Joy. He now acts as "New Daddy" to Joy's two sons. He works in the local dive The Crab Shack. Whenever Earl greets Darnell, he calls him "Crab Man" (or "Crabman"), and he has a generally friendly disposition. In the episode "Y2K", it is revealed that he used to go by the name Harry Monroe, until he was placed in a witness protection program, where he was to assume his new identity of Darnell Turner and was told to avoid liking cheese (which he still likes). He has a pet tortoise whom he calls Mr. Turtle.

Part of the season 4 episodes go into Darnell's history where he was raised and trained by his father Thomas Monroe (played by Danny Glover) in a secret government agency, and had developed the skills to be a top secret agent. However, when he refused to kill a nine-year-old leader of a socialist nation, and after testifying in court against his former employers, the government had to place him in witness protection from the agency. His cover is blown when he was shown on national television restraining Joy at a game show audition, so he, Joy, and their kids had to go under protection and assume other identities and live elsewhere. He agrees to join his father on one more mission, taking along Earl and sedating him multiple times, to free himself from having to need protection.

The episode "Our 'Cops' Is On" shows that he used to live with his supposed grandmother and grew and sold marijuana in his bedroom. In "Buried Treasure", he narrates that he graduated from college at age 14, was a virtuoso cellist, and could identify 254 varieties of cheese. Darnell speaks multiple languages: In "The Frank Factor" he tells Catalina that he speaks French, Russian and Arabic. He is also seen reading a newspaper printed in another language. In "My Name Is Alias", Joy remarks that he knows seven languages, and three combat sports that ends in "do." Occasionally, Darnell's afro is shown to hide cell phones which self-destruct after use. It is mentioned in season 4 he might have had a brother, and that his sister Pam died.

It is revealed in the very last episode of the show that Earl Jr., generally believed to be his son, is not.

== Relatives of the protagonists ==
=== Dodge Hickey ===
Dodge Chaz Hickey (played by Louis T. Moyle) is Joy's oldest son. Joy was six months pregnant with him when she and Earl got married the day after they met. In the pilot, Earl tells us "Joy didn't remember much about the boy's real father, except that he drove a Ford. So we named him Dodge." His middle name is Chaz, named after Earl's childhood hero, astronaut Chaz Dalton. His biological father was the subject of several episodes: Frank was a possibility in "The Frank Factor", and in the season 4 finale "Dodge's Dad", Camden's biggest business owner Little Chubby was another possibility, but DNA tests later revealed Earl to be the biological father. It was revealed Joy hooked up with Earl at a Halloween party where he and Little Chubby wore the same costume.

=== Earl Hickey, Jr. ===
Earl Hickey, Jr. (played by Trey Carlisle) is Joy and Darnell's son. After introducing Dodge in the pilot, Earl explains, "A few years later we were having our first child from my own personal seed. Doctors had already told us he was going to come out a boy, so we went ahead and named him." But as the doctor holds up a newborn mixed-race baby, Earl looks confused and finishes: "There he was — Earl Junior." He has a huge afro and is frequently seen playing rambunctiously with his half-brother, Dodge. Originally thought to be Darnell's child, a DNA test in the season 4 finale "Dodge's Dad" revealed that Darnell was not Earl Jr.'s father. Greg Garcia said that he and the writers had planned to make Earl Jr's dad someone famous, but because the show was cancelled, they never got a chance to figure it out.

=== Carl Hickey ===
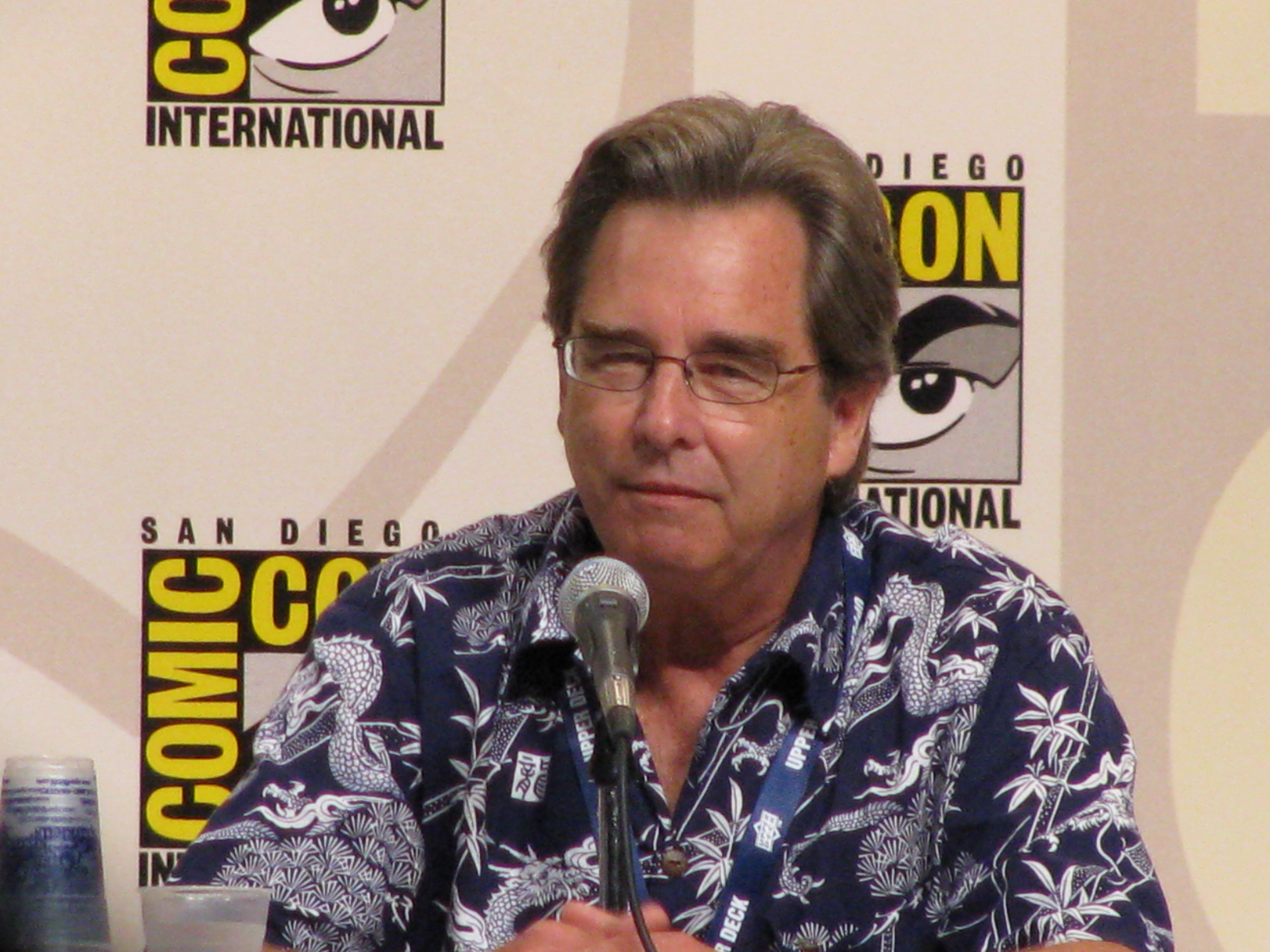
Beau Bridges played Earl and Randy's father Carl Hickey

Carlton Hickey (played by Beau Bridges) is Earl and Randy's father. He first appears in "Cost Dad the Election", where he had run for mayor but lost because of Earl's shenanigans that got the latter arrested. He originally ran for mayor because the airport flight path was directed over his residential area, causing his house to vibrate several times a day, which angers him very much. He is sorely disappointed in his sons and refused to have anything to do with Earl. However, he gradually realizes his son's efforts to improve his life were sincere and he and Earl are able to mend their relationship. In the episode "Dad's Car", he says that he had originally planned to name Earl after himself, but had put in an extra loop on the "C" when using cursive writing on the birth certificate.

=== Kay Hickey ===
Katherine "Kay" Hickey (played by Nancy Lenehan) is Earl and Randy's mother. She was also disappointed in Earl initially but is more tolerant than Carl. She is happy to see that Earl is now trying to turn his life around and eventually makes up with him for letting her down. She spends a lot of time dealing with Carl's battered ego. Earl's friend Ralph attempted unsuccessfully to come on to her after learning Earl had slept with Ralph's mother.

=== Liberty Washington ===
Liberty Washington (played by Tamala Jones) is Joy's mixed race half-sister, introduced in the season 2 episode "Blow". They had hated each other since grade school. She aspires to be a pro wrestler. She is married to Ray Ray. She and Joy eventually bond to the point where Joy became a surrogate mother for Liberty and her husband Ray Ray's baby. She and Ray Ray insist that Joy follow certain dietary restrictions and have a natural childbirth.

=== Ray Ray Washington ===
Ray Ray Washington (played by DJ Qualls) is Liberty's husband, who shares many character traits with Darnell. He owns a bearded dragon named "Mr. Bearded Dragon" whom he treats in the same fatherly manner that Darnell treats Mr. Turtle. His father's name was "Ray" and named him "Ray-Ray", that is why he would like to name his unborn child "Ray-Ray-Ray". In 'Midnight Bun', Joy gives birth to their daughter Ray Ray Ray Anne, after she acts as a surrogate for Liberty and Ray Ray due to Liberty wanting to have a wrestling career.

=== Billie Cunningham ===
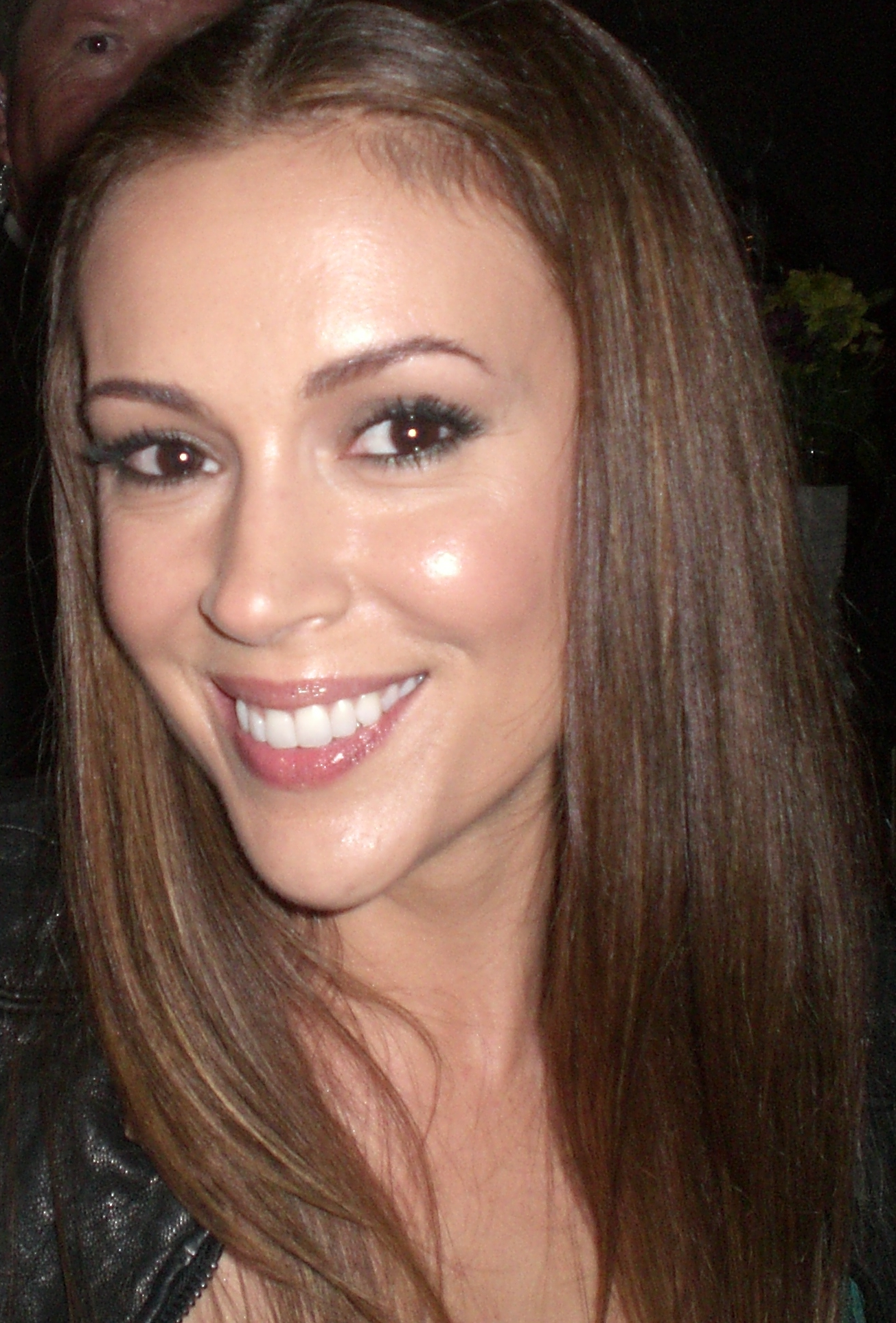
Alyssa Milano in 2008. She played Billie Cunningham in the third season

Billie Cunningham (played by Alyssa Milano) is a young woman who first appears in the season 3 episode "Frank's Girl". She had graduated from community college when she met Frank Stump and joined Frank in a life of crime, robbing stores and other places. During a conjugal visit, Earl informs her that Frank got placed in solitary confinement again, which prompts her to break up with Frank, especially when she finds out he had shared with Earl a nude picture of her. Earl convinces Billie to give Frank a second chance, but learns that since Frank has been in prison, Billie has been getting her life back together and enrolled in nursing school. Not wanting her to be sabotaged by the relationship, Earl has Frank break up with her.

It was later revealed that Billie had gone back to her criminal ways, quitting nursing school, stealing her cousin's rent money and gas, and robbing a liquor store. She crashes into Earl with her car but then gets hit by a car herself when going for help. After some time in the hospital, Officer Stuart Daniels, who had hit her with the car, looks after her, telling her that she had killed Earl and needed to lay low at his place. While Earl is in a coma, he imagines Billie as his loving housewife in a television sitcom called The Hickeys. After seeing Stuart, Frank, Earl, and Catalina (who was trying to be a lesbian and coming onto her), she eventually chooses Earl and they get married. She attempts to make her own list, but only does a half effort on it. With her insurance settlement, she controls the finances in the marriage but becomes very frugal with Earl. In the season 3 finale, she gets very jealous of Earl spending so much time with his list, and makes him choose between her and the list. However, the police catch up to her and she escapes into an Amish-type settlement near Camden, where she finds inner peace. She not only divorces Earl but also gives him $72,000, what was left of her insurance settlement.

== Earl's friends and acquaintances ==
=== Kenny James ===
Kenneth James (played by Gregg Binkley, played as a child by Andy Pessoa) is a former victim of Earl's bullying as a child, Kenny is one of the first items on his list that Earl attempts to fix by helping him come out as homosexual and restoring his confidence. As a result, the two became friends and Kenny helps Earl with completing his list whenever he can, usually to his comedic detriment. He has a job as an assistant manager of a copy shop, which he uses to his advantage, such as printing fake birth certificates and résumés. He drives a powder blue Le Car which he also uses to help out Earl. In the episode "Stole P's HD Cart", he helped Earl and the gang get jobs at a hot dog company by passing their typing exams. After his boyfriend dumped him, Kenny asked Earl to help him become more of a manly man, which unwittingly led to both of them having a gambling addiction. He joins Joy's addiction recovery group. In the flashback episode "Our 'Cops' Is On", he had prepared his house to receive officer Stuart Daniels. In "Our Other 'Cops' Is On", he won a ride-along with a cop prize in a silent auction and got to hang out with Officer Daniels for the day. During the flashback episodes, when the camera is on him, he tries to act masculine and heterosexual. He is one of the few people in Camden who uses the World Wide Web at home. At the end of the third season, he and Daniels become lovers.

=== Patty, the daytime hooker ===
Patricia Michelle Weezmer (played by Dale Dickey) is a middle-aged prostitute in Camden County. She prefers to work during the daytime, exchanging sexual favors and other fetishes such as piggyback rides or massages at a major discount and often getting paid in fast food. She is often arrested. In the evening, she works as a waitress (episode "Monkeys Take a Bath") and has been involved in community theatre (episode "Inside Probe, Part 1"). She has also spent time outside of Camden: in her early 20s she was in Calcutta (episode "Number One"), and she also lived in La Paz, the same city as Catalina (episode "Earl and Joy's Anniversary"). In the episode "Inside Probe, Part 1", it is revealed she was half-Cherokee and lived on an Indian reservation before her mother divorced her father, Chasing Squirrel.

=== Ralph Mariano ===
Ralph Mariano (played by Giovanni Ribisi, played as a child by Tanner Maguire) is a former partner in crime and good friend of Earl's, who goes in and out of jail on an almost weekly basis. He and Earl have been friends since childhood, when Earl first taught Ralph how to steal. He isn't the most observant person in the world and doesn't quite understand the whole karma lifestyle. Following in Earl's footsteps, he attempts to clean up his act by getting a job at a lamp store, only to go back to stealing the same day because he didn't win the lottery. A dedicated criminal, he will do anything for $200. He has a sister who dances at Club Chubby. He also once started a short-lived rock band along with Earl and Randy. He has several tattoos, including a yin/yang on his forearm (which was put there because he thought it was "two tadpoles doin' it") and "two cougars doin' it" on his ankle. He only has nine toes following an incident where he cut his pinky toe off to put in a hotdog, forcing a huge hotdog franchise pay a settlement, which was used to rebuild the local hotdog stand that he was once paid by them to burn down in the episode "Stole P's HD Cart". After learning that Earl had once slept with his mother, Ralph makes him marry her to "make an honest woman" out of her in the episode "Van Hickey". When Earl is sentenced to two years in Camden County Prison, Ralph is his cellmate, only to escape the next day by drilling a hole behind a Dolly Parton poster, making a dummy with a watermelon for the head, and leaving Earl behind. He explains in his letter that he would have let Earl come with him but he was hungry and ate the second watermelon. He is also mentioned in "Bounty Hunter" as having a bounty for $1200 for larceny of a dog and resisting arrest.

=== Donny Jones ===
Donny Jones (played by Silas Weir Mitchell) is a friend of Earl's and a former criminal who had been wrongly convicted of attempted robbery (Earl used Donny's shirt in the robbery). During his prison sentence of two years, he began reading the Bible and found Jesus. Once Earl confessed to Donny about committing the crime, Donny forgave him on the basis he would have eventually gone to prison anyway. He has two tattoos: one of Jesus on his chest, from which he occasionally seeks advice; and one on his buttocks of Moses parting the Red Sea. He also appeared in the flashback episode "Y2K", where he was part of Earl's group that took over a department store. Even though Donny has now reformed he still intimidates people, mainly Earl, because he has "crazy eyes" and a towering stature. In "Quit Smoking", Earl says often that "Donny is crazy."

=== Nescobar-A-Lop-Lop ===
Nescobar-A-Lop-Lop (played by Abdoulaye N'Gom) is an African immigrant appearing in the episode "Teacher Earl" as a student in Earl's English language class. Like other class members, he proudly greets Earl with his first English phrase: "My. Name. Is. Earl.", but then uses that as a greeting. In addition to Earl's class, he picks up much of his English from watching American television, and uses the catchphrase "Seacrest. Out.". In "The Birthday Party", when Earl asks him how the English lessons are coming, Nescobar replies "I speak better than you, bitch!" In the season 2 episode "Born a Gamblin' Man", he is part of Joy's addiction recovery group, where he is addicted to stealing pens, this becoming a recurring gag in later episodes. At Joy's trial, he helps Joy's lawyer by translating the sign language interpreter (who happens to be his wife)'s Mandarin Chinese words. (Note: According to the My Name Is Earl Season 1 DVD, the actor N'Gom is actually fluent in six languages, including Mandarin.)

=== Jasper ===
Jasper (played by J. Lamont Pope) runs a fencing operation out of a self storage unit, selling merchandise stolen from the local mall at a discount rate. He has a Russian mail-order bride named Tatiana (played by Jessica Cauffiel) who apparently lives in the storage unit and does not like kissing him. She has a large mole on her chin.

=== Frank Stump ===
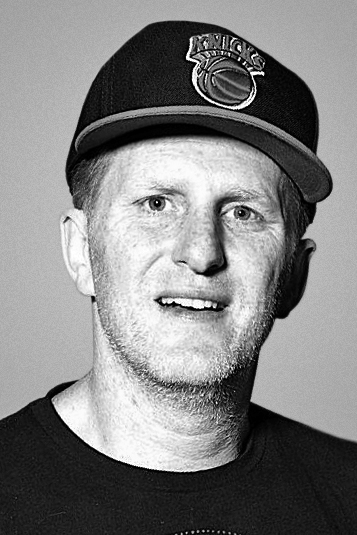
Michael Rapaport portrayed character Frank Stump in the third season

Frank Stump (played by Michael Rapaport) is an old friend of Earl and Randy's that is introduced in the episode "The Frank Factor". He was subletting rooms in his trailer and agreed to have Earl and Randy stay in the kitchen area while his other roommate Paco had the living room. He was also formerly employed at the Crab Shack. However, he had also made a living stealing things and was saving up for guns to pull off a robbery at an Indian casino. The robbery went off without a hitch, but during the getaway, Paco accidentally hits an FBI van. He is serving a 20-year sentence. His trailer is then occupied by Joy and Earl, and his El Camino is used by Earl. In the episode "Frank's Girl", he has been dating a young woman named Billie who had graduated from community college and joined him in a life of crime, but after missing a conjugal visit and being convinced by Earl, he agrees to part ways with her. In "Randy in Charge", he joins a group of prisoners to give a Scared Straight! talk at a school, but when Randy sends the two other convicts to buy ice cream and has to check on them, he escapes. In the next episode "Midnight Bun", he returns to his trailer, where he had hidden a gun and some cash, but Randy's prison K-9 dog eventually stops him and he returns to prison. In "Early Release" he helps Earl plan an escape from prison by sharing what tactics have not worked, but when he and Paco leave Earl and escape, they crash into a police car and have to return. In "Love Octagon", he lives in a halfway house, where he wears a shock collar on his neck.

=== Paco ===
Paco (played by Raymond Cruz) is Frank Stump's trailermate and usual partner in crime, introduced in the season 3 episode "The Frank Factor". He is Catalina's childhood sweetheart and hopes to reunite with her. He sends for her around the time they were planning on a big robbery of an Indian casino, however, when he and Frank were making their getaway, he is distracted by Catalina on the side of the road, and inadvertently hits an FBI van (the one that Darnell got out of.) He is serving time in the same prison as Frank and Earl. In "Midnight Bun" he accidentally reveals that Frank had hidden some cash in the trailer. In "Early Release", he and Frank escape from prison, but when Paco sees Catalina on the side of the road again, he crashes into a police car and has to return. In "Love Octagon", due to prison overcrowding, he lives in a halfway house and works at Camden Foreign Foods as its mascot Senor Lo Mein. He also finally reunites with Catalina in that episode, finally catching her attention and they reconcile but he does not appear in any episodes following.

== Other recurring characters ==
=== Big Chubby ===
Big Chubby (played by Burt Reynolds) is Camden's most wealthy and prominent business owner, his ventures including owning the strip club where Catalina is employed, a dry cleaners, a BBQ restaurant, and several companies in the construction industry; it is implied that he owns many more. He is known for being eccentric; he is known to trick patrons by pointing a realistic-appearing gun in their face and demanding they open their mouths, only to spray vodka into their mouths when he pulls the trigger. He is shown to occasionally confuse his "liquor gun" with a standard firearm, which leads to his untimely demise while attempting to take a vodka "gun shot" himself.

=== Little Chubby ===
Little Chubby (played by Norm Macdonald) is the equally, if not more, eccentric adult son of Big Chubby. Unlike his father, however, Little Chubby is not equally loved and feared but rather just merely feared, as the regular low-life patrons of the Crab Shack even consider him to be a sociopath and for his to be antics intolerable. He is one of the few men whom Earl fears prior to making his list in the series' pilot. He lives a highly luxurious lifestyle when not a patron of his father's businesses. He becomes much more friendly and likeable after Earl causes him severe testicular damage, reducing his testosterone output, and again after Little Chubby willingly allows them to become damaged again in order to be a better person. He is briefly believed to be Dodge's dad but this is not the case.

=== Didi ===
Didi (played by Tracy Ashton) is the one-legged girl from whom Earl stole a car after telling her he loved her. She works at Yummy's Donut Shop (episode "Monkeys in Space") and has a fast one-armed, no-legged boyfriend named Jake (played by Cameron Clapp), whom she met while hopping after Earl's winning lottery ticket as it blew in the wind (episode "Number One"). She is still angry at Earl and had her boyfriend chase him away when he tried to apologize. Didi gets around by hopping (although she does possess a prosthetic leg, the only use it gets is when her dog humps it), whereas her boyfriend uses prosthetic limbs and is quite agile. She lives across the street from Donny Jones. She always called Earl a "son of a bitch" when she sees him, and chases after him. The cause of her losing a leg is unknown; however, in "Our Other 'Cops' Is On", Didi states that "she already survived one explosion". She finally forgives Earl in the season 3 finale, where she has Earl try to live a day on one leg to see how she gets around.

=== Electrolarynx Guy ===
Electrolarynx Guy (played by Jack Axelrod) is an unnamed old man who can only speak with the help of an electrolarynx, apparently because of a lifetime of smoking. He sold Randy a Quit Smoking cassette for $0.32 (negotiated from $0.40). He also posed as Randy's father when Randy went back to high school in "Randy's Touchdown". According to a deleted scene commentary in the season 1 episode "O Karma, Where Art Thou?", Jack Axelrod does not use an electrolarynx in real life.

=== Natalie Duckworth ===
Natalie Duckworth (played by Beth Riesgraf, then-girlfriend of Jason Lee) was Earl's one-time girlfriend; her first appearance was in "Faked My Own Death". Natalie was unable to take a hint that Earl was not into her, so he faked his own death. He later told her that her clingy personality was the real reason he faked his death. In turn, Natalie faked her own death to make Earl feel bad, and in doing so, she gained a large amount of confidence. She also appeared in "Our 'Cops' Is On"; after Joy and Earl stole a police car, Joy called Natalie a slut with a megaphone and told her to get "on [the car in front of Joy] and spread [her] legs".

=== Willie the One-Eyed Mailman ===
Willie the One-Eyed Mailman (played by Bill Suplee, who is Ethan Suplee's father) is a local mailman who wears an eye patch. He is affable but somewhat of a slacker as he has been seen throwing mail on the floor of someone's home or simply throwing it in the garbage. His lack of depth perception has caused problems for him more than once when giving or reaching for items (episode "Number One"). He had lost his eye when Joy smashed Earl's Def Leppard picture and a glass shard damaged his eye (episode "Our 'Cops' Is On"). In the episode "Monkeys Take a Bath", he takes out his glass eye so he can play some kind of marble game, only to lose it when Joy bought the game at a garage sale.

=== TV's Tim Stack ===
TV's Tim Stack (played by Timothy Stack, who is also the series' Consulting Producer and occasional episode writer) is Camden's hometown celebrity as he has appeared in a number of television shows. He is regularly seen intoxicated and wearing the wardrobe of his character Notch Johnson from Son of the Beach. In "Broke Joy's Fancy Figurine", he hosts the Balboa & Sons' mother-daughter pageant. (Note: In a deleted scene, TV's Tim Stack "took" Catalina out to dinner, only to give the bill to her, down a pill of Viagra and offer to go back to her place.) In "Y2K", he was a featured participant in Camden County's New Year's Day parade. In the "Our 'Cops' Is On" flashback episode, he was pulled over for drunk driving, where he stated that he had 62 credits in IMDb. (Note: Timothy Stack's claim of having 62 credits on IMDb was accurate prior to the airing of "Our 'Cops' Is On", which would have made it the 63rd appearance.) The officer let him go because he was a fan of Stack's role on Punky Brewster, after which he crashed into the side of the road again. In a flashback episode "Harassed a Reporter", a visibly disoriented Stack is present at a ribbon-cutting ceremony for a rehabilitation center. In the flashback episode "The Frank Factor", he was a potential sugar daddy for Joy, but she was grossed out when he dressed up as an adult baby for their tryst. He also appears in "Bad Earl", where he and Earl's friends try to do an intervention, having been in several interventions himself before. In season 4 his agent Wilfred Dierkes (played by producer Greg Garcia) is seen in some episodes.

=== Iqball ===
Iqball (played by Abdul Goznobi) is the clerk at the Camden Market who sold Earl the winning lottery ticket. He appears in multiple episodes whenever there are Camden townsfolk around, in his green-vested work uniform. In the season 1 finale, "Number One", he speaks Bengali relying on Patty to translate for him, but in later episodes, he is shown speaking English, as well. In the second COPS-themed episode set, he has a food booth at the Camden July 4 Fair. In the season 4 flashback episode "Earl and Joy's Anniversary", he tells the folks stuck in the phone booth that the bees have moved on to Texas. He also competed against Erik Estrada in acting out the Yorick scene in Hamlet on the Estrada or Nada game show.

=== Stuart Daniels ===
Stuart Daniels (played by Mike O'Malley), introduced in the episode "Stole a Badge", comes from a family of police officers, his mother and four sisters all being on the job. He is frequently scolded by his family for losing his badge and other actions of incompetence, and when Earl stole the badge, he was demoted to watching over a rest stop where he has to replenish the toilet paper rolls at his own expense. He lost interest in improving his career, but with Earl's help, he quits the police force and pursues his dream of becoming a professional bowler. He was one of the officers featured in the COPS-themed flashback episodes. In "Our 'Cops' Is On", he breaks up a fight between the Electrolarynx Man and Nescobar-A-Lop-Lop, confronts Donny Jones about his public nudity, and remains blissfully unaware of Kenny James's attempts to come on to him. In "Our Other 'Cops' Is On", Kenny James wins the "ride-along with a cop" silent auction and joins him. He inadvertently loses $50,000 worth of surveillance equipment that he was going to demonstrate, as well as the Fourth of July Fair's fireworks. He accidentally hits Billie Cunningham with his car when she was helping Earl. He then tries to make it up to her by visiting her at the hospital and taking her home, telling her that the cops are looking for her. At the end of the third season, having interacted with Kenny many times and discovering they have similar interests, he moves in with Kenny and they become lovers.

=== Josh Martin ===
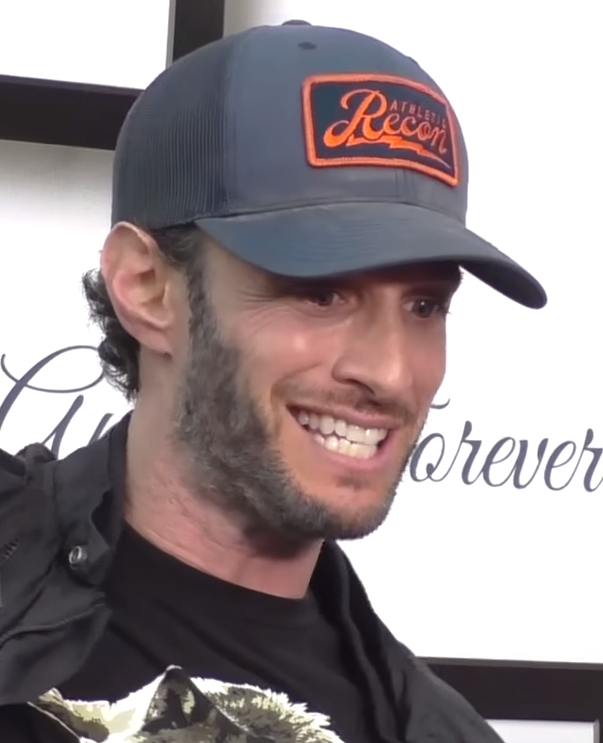
Josh Wolf played Joshua Martin, who later appeared in several flashback episodes.

Joshua Martin (played by Josh Wolf) is a Bargain Bag store employee, first appearing in "Very Bad Things", where Earl and Joy discover him in the back of a Bargain Bag truck that the latter had stolen. Earl and Joy tried to help Josh escape without him being able to identify them, but they were unsuccessful and Joy was sent to prison for grand theft auto, kidnapping and assault. In "Kept a Guy Locked in a Truck", he is found dead in his apartment, having been crushed by a retracted Murphy bed. His spirit haunts Earl and demands not to be forgotten. Earl tries to throw a funeral for him but is unable to find any friends, only to discover that his friends are all from the Internet.

Josh appears in other flashback-themed episodes such as the COPS-themed "Our Other 'Cops' Is On!", where he mans a Bargain Bag booth. In "I Won't Die with a Little Help from My Friends (Part 2)", Josh appears in Earl's coma world, ready to escort Earl to the afterlife. In "Inside Probe, Part 2", he had re-cemented the floor of the women's bathroom at the Crab Shack, inadvertently where its owner Ernie Belcher had later fallen in and died.

=== Ruby Whitlow ===
Ruby Whitlow (played by Marlee Matlin) is a deaf attorney assigned to Joy's criminal case in season 2. She has an interpreter named Doug, but can also read lips and talk a little bit, of which Joy thinks Ruby has a funny accent. In the episode "The Trial", Earl falls in love with Ruby and they have a one-night stand. However, she discovers Earl's list in which he had robbed her two years prior because she was deaf and couldn't hear him break in, and they break up. At Joy's trial, Doug had injured his tongue, so Ruby has a Mandarin-speaking woman who knows sign language help her out, and Nescobar-A-Lop-Lop translate from Mandarin to English. The trial is about 50/50 until Earl's 911 tapes condemn Joy. However, when Earl takes the punishment, she is impressed.

=== Dan Coscino ===
Dan Coscino (played by production assistant Dan Coscino) is a background character who sings or appears at several random venues such as the Fourth of July Fair, the Pimmit Hills Trailer Park, and the Crab Shack. He is typically seen wearing a T-shirt with his name on it.

=== Jerry Hazelwood ===
Jeremiah "Jerry" Hazelwood (played by Craig T. Nelson) is the Warden of Camden County, As the husband of the governor, he was caught by her in the presence of some dignitaries when he was in his underwear playing Guitar Hero. He is placed in an assortment of jobs for which he is incompetent. For instance, he was in charge of Homeland Security where he didn't think anything would happen prior to September 11, 2001. He eventually became warden but still initiates poorly thought-out programs such as having the inmates build ladders, or having the prison guards host a Take Our Daughters to Work Day and almost had one of the short-statured inmates escape as a student. At one point he accidentally admits to the press that his wife the governor has a sexual addiction and that they are also having problems in their marriage and having marriage counseling. As he is afraid of violent confrontations, he often has Earl do his job, rewarding him with certificates that reduce Earl's prison time. He has Earl stop a gang rivalry, start a Scared Straight! program for kids, and start a program to mediate problems between victims and criminals. However, he later shreds all of Earl's certificates in order to keep Earl working for him. When Jerry sees his former roommate Darnell, he is reminded of his days as a porn star by the name of Richard Jammer in the 1980s and 1990s, and not wanting that to surface, he reinstates Earl's certificates and releases him from prison.

=== Jeff Hoyne ===
Jeffrey Hoyne (played by Billy Gardell) is an overweight and incompetent police officer who appears mostly in seasons 3 and 4. He has two identical siblings, a brother, named Billy, who works in a warehouse at Waadt Appliance and is deemed the more fit of the two brothers; and an unnamed sister, both of whom are also portrayed by Gardell.

=== Mr. Turtle ===
Mr. Turtle is Darnell's pet turtle and has a recurring role throughout the show.
