= Ethan Suplee =

American actor (born 1976)

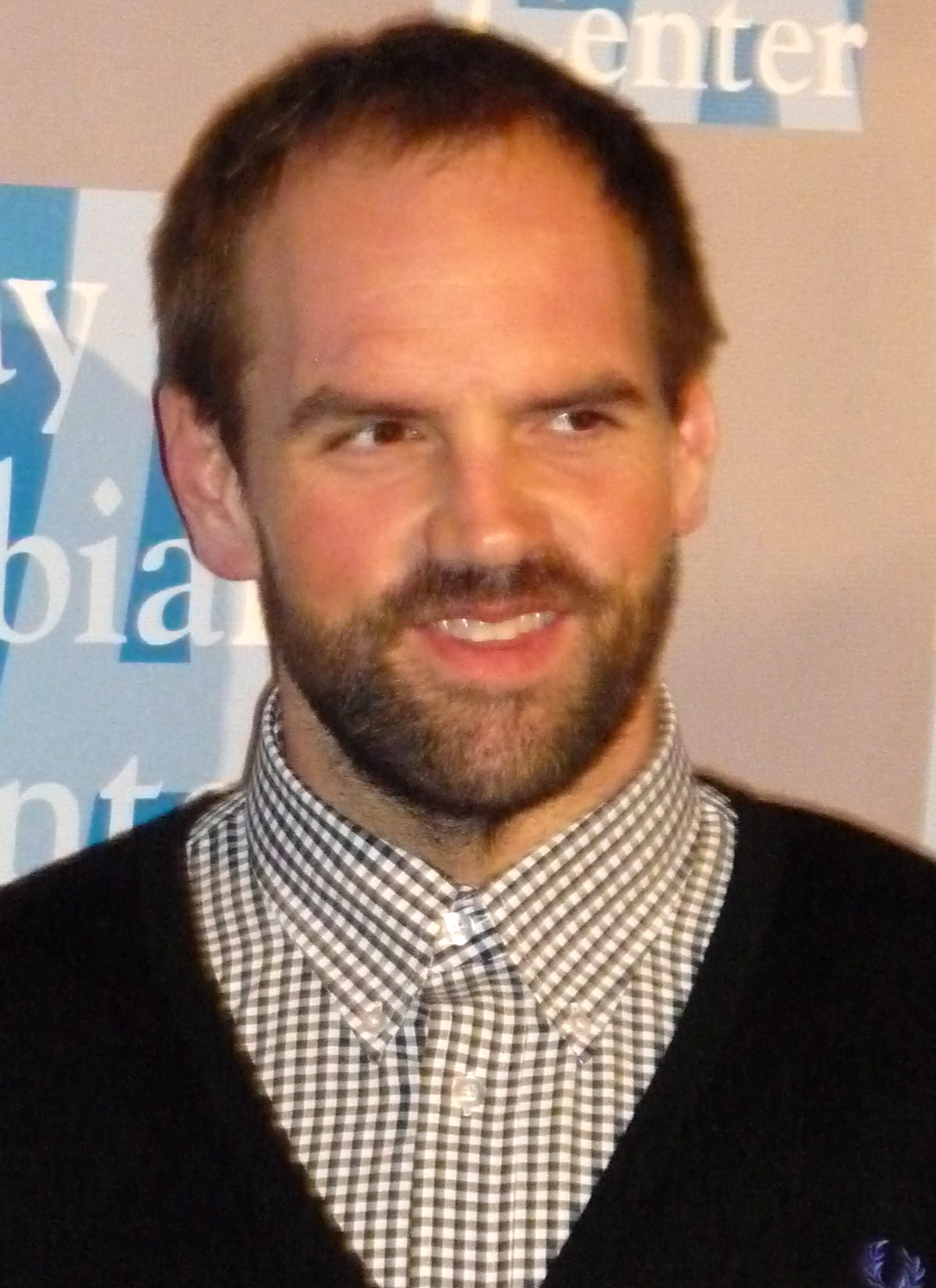
- Suplee in 2011
- Born: May 25, 1976 (age 50); New York City, U.S.
- Occupation: Actor
- Years active: 1994–present
- Spouse: Brandy Lewis (m. 2006)
- Children: 4

Ethan L. Suplee (/suːˈpliː/ soo-PLEE; born May 25, 1976) is an American actor. He is known for his roles in the films American History X, Blow, Remember the Titans, John Q, The Wolf of Wall Street, Cold Mountain, Without a Paddle, Unstoppable, several of Kevin Smith's films, as well as Frankie in Boy Meets World, and Randy Hickey in My Name Is Earl, and Billy Tompkins on The Ranch.

== Early life ==
Suplee was born in Manhattan, New York City, the son of Debbie and Bill Suplee (who later played Willie the One Eyed Mailman in My Name Is Earl). His parents were actors who met while performing summer stock theater and appeared on Broadway. On the Your Welcome show, Ethan stated that he dropped out of school at age 14.

== Career ==
The first major role Suplee landed was as Willam in Mallrats, directed by Kevin Smith, alongside future My Name is Earl costar Jason Lee. He also appeared briefly in the independent View Askew-produced Drawing Flies. Smith cast both Suplee and Lee again in later films Chasing Amy and Dogma. They both make cameos in Clerks II. At the same time as the filming of Mallrats, Suplee also had a recurring role as Frankie "The Enforcer" Stechino in Boy Meets World, from 1994 to 1998.

Suplee's dramatic performances include the roles of the ruthless white power skinhead Seth in American History X, one of three men who rape a clown in Vulgar, Ashton Kutcher's goth college roommate "Thumper" in The Butterfly Effect, American football player Louie Lastik in Remember the Titans, Johnny Depp's buddy and initial drug-dealing partner Tuna in Blow, and the simpleminded Pangle in Cold Mountain. Suplee also had a cameo in the HBO TV series Entourage in the fictional movie Queens Boulevard. In 2014, he was cast in the TV Land original sitcom Jennifer Falls, which reunited him with My Name Is Earl co-star, Jaime Pressly. In 2016, Suplee started playing D in Hulu's series Chance, as well as police officer Billy "Beer Pong" Tompkins on the Netflix sitcom The Ranch.

In 2020, Suplee launched his own podcast entitled American Glutton.

In August 2026, Suplee publicly cautioned against overreliance on GLP-1 weight-loss drugs, saying that sustainable weight loss comes from building healthier long-term habits rather than relying on medication alone.

== Personal life ==
Since 2006, Suplee has been married to Brandy Lewis, the younger sister of actress and singer Juliette Lewis. He is a Scientologist.

In March 2011, Suplee was featured on TMZ on TV, having lost over 200 lb (91 kg) in body weight. He mentioned on his podcast American Glutton that his heaviest weight was 530 lb (240 kg) and his lightest weight was 220 lb (100 kg). He has credited cycling for helping keep fit, explaining "I ride road bikes, I ride bicycles". He once reached an all-time low of 9% body fat, but put some of the weight back on upon realizing that his weight had been a past source of acting opportunities.

In August 2026, Suplee talked about his use of heroin in a tribute to the recently deceased Hayden Panettiere, his Remember the Titans co-star.

== Filmography ==
=== Film ===
+Key	†	Denotes works that have not yet been released

Year	Title	Role	Notes	Reference(s)
1995	Mallrats	Willam Black		
1996	One Down	Prison inmate		
1997	Chasing Amy	Comic Fan		
1997	A Better Place	Large Rude Student		
1997	35 Miles from Normal	Mike		
1997	11th Hour	Mike		
1998	Desert Blue	Cale		
1998	American History X	Seth Ryan		
1998	Bad Trip	Josh		
1999	Dogma	Noman the Golgothan	Voice role	
1999	Tyrone	Joshua Schatzberg		
2000	Takedown	Dan Brodley		
2000	Road Trip	Ed Bradford		
2000	Vulgar	Frankie Fanelli		
2000	Remember the Titans	Louie Lastik		
2001	Don's Plum	Big Bum		
2001	Blow	Tuna		
2001	Evolution	Deke Donald		
2002	John Q.	Max Conlin		
2002	The First $20 Million Is Always the Hardest	Tiny		
2003	Cold Mountain	Pangle		
2004	The Butterfly Effect	Thumper		
2004	Without a Paddle	Elwood		
2005	Neo Ned	Johnny-Orderly		
2006	Art School Confidential	Vince		
2006	Clerks II	Teen #2		
2006	The Fountain	Manny		
2007	Mr. Woodcock	Nedderman		
2007	Cutlass	Bruce	Short film	
2008	Struck	Cupid	Short film	
2009	Fanboys	Harry Knowles		
2009	Brothers	Sweeney		
2010	The Dry Land	Jack		
2010	Unstoppable	Dewey		
2011	I'm Having a Difficult Time Killing My Parents	Andrew	Short film	
2011	Grow Up Already	Bunky	Short film	
2012	Ten Feet Apart	Homer	Short film	
2012	Paper Cuts	Steven		
2012	Delivery	Jake	Short film	
2013	Breakout	Kenny Baxter		
2013	The Wolf of Wall Street	Toby Welch		
2014	Walk of Shame	Officer Dave		
2015	True Story	Pat Frato		
2015	Tooken	Paul Miller		
2016	The Trust	Russian Roulette Detective		
2016	Deepwater Horizon	Jason Anderson		
2019	Motherless Brooklyn	Gilbert Coney		
2020	The Hunt	Gary		
2022	Dog	Noah		
2022	Clerks III	Willam Black	Role shared with Scott Mosier	
2022	Babylon	Wilson		
2023	Manodrome	Dad Leo		
2023	God Is a Bullet	Gutter		
2023	Blood for Dust	Slim		
2024	Let's Start a Cult	Cody Harper		
2025	Dolly	Tobe		
2025	Bad Man	Downer		
TBA	Pearl †	Roy	Post-production	

=== Television ===
Year	Title	Role	Notes	Reference(s)
1994	Tales from the Crypt	Jaimie	Episode: "Operation Friendship"	
1994–1998	Boy Meets World	Frankie Stechino	19 episodes	
1995	Sister, Sister	Lionel	Episode: "Put to the Test"	
1996	Don't Look Back	Gary	Television film	
2004	Third Watch	Aaron Gordon	Episode: "Obsession"	
2005–2009	My Name Is Earl	Randy Hickey	96 episodes; Main cast	
2005–2010	Entourage	Himself	2 episodes	
2006	The Year Without a Santa Claus	Jingle Bells	Television film	
2010	The Good Guys	Andy Davis	Episode: "Dan on the Run"	
2010	Playing with Guns	Siff	Television film	
2010	Nevermind Nirvana	Perry	Television film	
2011	No Ordinary Family	Tom Seeley	Episode: "No Ordinary Double Standard"	
2011–2013	Raising Hope	Andrew	5 episodes	
2011	Wilfred	Spencer	2 episodes	
2012	Men at Work	Dan	Episode: "Milo Full of Grace"	
2012	Rise of the Zombies	Marshall	Television film	
2014	Jennifer Falls	Wayne Doyle	10 episodes; Main cast	
2016–2020	The Ranch	Officer Billy "Beer Pong" Tompkins	13 episodes	
2016–2017	Chance	Darius "D" Pringle	20 episodes; Main cast	
2017	Twin Peaks	Bill Shaker	Episode: "The Return, Part 4"	
2018–2020	Vampirina	Uncle Bob Bigfoot	3 episodes; Voice	
2019	Santa Clarita Diet	Tommy	6 episodes	
2020	Good Girls	Gil	3 episodes	
2024	The Pradeeps of Pittsburgh	Jimbo Mills	8 episodes	
2025	The Terminal List: Dark Wolf	Klaus	Episode: "E&E"	

=== Music video ===
Year	Title	Role	Artist	Reference(s)
2002	"Lonesome Tears"	Friend	Beck	
2008	"Wasting Time"	Guy at the door	The Briggs	
2010	"3000 Miles Away"	Interrogator	Star Fucking Hipsters	

=== Video games ===
Year	Title	Role	Notes	Reference(s)
2022	The Quarry	Robert N. "Bobby" Hackett	Likeness; Motion capture; Voice	

== Awards and nominations ==
Year	Award	Category	Work	Result
2006	OFTA Television Award	Best Supporting Actor in a Comedy Series	My Name is Earl	Nominated
2006	Screen Actors Guild Award	Outstanding Performance by an Ensemble in a Comedy Series Shared with Jason Lee, Jaime Pressly, Eddie Steeples, and Nadine Velazquez	My Name is Earl	Nominated
2007	Golden Nymph	Outstanding Actor – Comedy Series	My Name is Earl	Nominated
2007	OFTA Television Award	Best Supporting Actor in a Comedy Series	My Name is Earl	Nominated
2014	Gold Derby Film Award	Ensemble Cast Shared with Leonardo DiCaprio, Jonah Hill, Matthew McConaughey, Jon Bernthal, Jean Dujardin, Jon Favreau, Joanna Lumley, Cristin Milioti, Rob Reiner and Margot Robbie	The Wolf of Wall Street	Nominated
2014	Seattle Film Critics Award	Best Ensemble Cast Shared with Leonardo DiCaprio, Jonah Hill, Matthew McConaughey, Jon Bernthal, Jean Dujardin, Jon Favreau, Joanna Lumley, Cristin Milioti, Rob Reiner and Margot Robbie	The Wolf of Wall Street	Nominated
