= Marc Buckland =

American television director and producer

- Occupations: Television director and producer
- Years active: 1987–present

Marc Buckland is an American television director and producer.

== Filmography ==
Year	Title	Director	Executive Producer
2019-2020	Stumptown	Yes	No
2017-2019	Santa Clarita Diet	Yes	No
2017	Powerless	Yes	No
2016	Dream Team	Yes	No
2015	The Millers	Yes	No
2013-2014	Sean Saves the World	Yes	Yes
2013	The Gates	Yes	No
2012	Next Caller	Yes	Yes
2012	Bent	Yes	No
2011	Grimm	Yes	Yes
2011	Love Bites	Yes	Yes
2005-2007	My Name Is Earl	Yes	Yes
2000-2004	Ed	Yes	Yes
2002	The Jake Effect	Yes	Yes
2001-2003	Scrubs	Yes	No
1999	Sports Night	Yes	No
1999	The West Wing	Yes	No
1998	Felicity	Yes	No
1997	Murder One	Yes	No
