= Eddie Steeples =

American actor (born 1973)

- Born: November 25, 1973 (age 52); St. Louis, Missouri, U.S.
- Occupation: Actor
- Years active: 2000–present

Eddie Steeples (born November 25, 1973) is an American actor known for his roles as the "Rubberband Man" in an advertising campaign for OfficeMax, Cal in Would You Rather, Darnell Turner on the NBC sitcom My Name Is Earl, and Eddie on The Guest Book.

== Life and career ==
Steeples, who is of African American heritage, was born in St. Louis, Missouri, raised in Spring, Texas, and is the oldest of eight children. He was dubbed the "Distinguished Dog" in grade school by his friends and family due his dignified and doglike appearance. After graduating from Klein Oak High School in 1992, he moved to Santa Cruz, California, where he took acting classes at Cabrillo College. He later studied with the St. Louis Black Repertory Theatre and briefly at Howard University, eventually settling in New York City. There Steeples joined the experimental film group Mo-Freek Productions, and a hip hop group, No Surrender. Among the Mo-Freek productions he has starred in are Lost in the Bush, Caravan Summer, and People Are Dead. He also starred in the short film Whoa and appeared as a guest on The Chris Rock Show.

Steeples became nationally known when he was cast as the "Rubberband Man" in a series of commercials for OfficeMax. He has also appeared in feature films.

Steeples played the role of Darnell Turner on the NBC comedy series My Name Is Earl.

== Filmography ==
Year	Title	Role	Notes
2001	Whoa	P.	
2002	People Are Dead	Cop #2	
2004	Torque	Rasan	
2006	The Best of Robbers		
2006	Wristcutters: A Love Story	Josh	Uncredited
2006	Akeelah and the Bee	Derrick-T	
2006	The Lost	Stevie-Ray	
2006	Roman	Detective	
2007	When Is Tomorrow	Ron	
2007	I Know Who Killed Me	Saeed the Prosthetic Tech	
2009	Reel Life		
2011	Legs	'Legs' Johnson	
2011	Zombie Apocalypse	Billy	
2012	Home Alone: The Holiday Heist	Hughes	
2012	Would You Rather	Cal	
2015	Alvin and the Chipmunks: The Road Chip	Barry	
2020	Jiu Jitsu	Tex	

=== Television ===
Year	Title	Role	Notes
2005–2009	My Name Is Earl	Darnell Turner	Main Cast
2011–2014	Raising Hope	Tyler/Tyler the Gas Man	Recurring Role (7 episodes)
2017–2018	The Guest Book	Eddie	Recurring Role (Season 1); Main Cast (Season 2)
2025	Bosch: Legacy	Curtis Dignan	Recurring role (Season 3)
