= Nadine Velazquez =

American actress (born 1978)

Nadine Velázquez
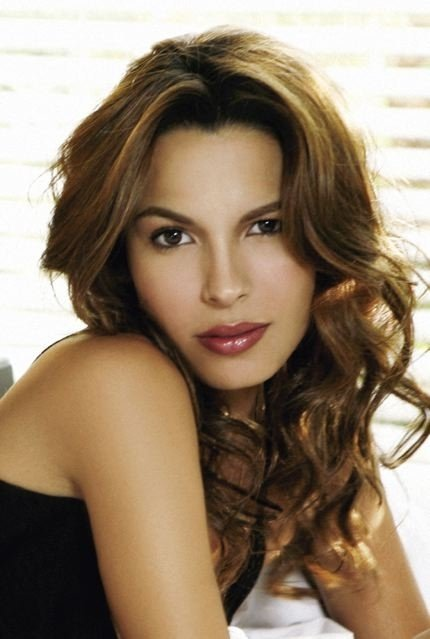
- Velázquez c. 2006
- Born: November 20, 1978 (age 47); Chicago, Illinois, U.S.
- Occupations: Actress; model
- Years active: 1999–present
- Spouse: Marc Provissiero (m. 2005; div. 2011)

Nadine E. Velázquez (born November 20, 1978) is an American actress and model known for her roles as Catalina Aruca on My Name Is Earl and Sofia Ruxin on The League. She has also appeared in films such as Blast (2004), A Day in the Life (2009), Flight (2012), Snitch (2013), and Ride Along 2 (2016), and was a cast member on the TV series Major Crimes.

== Early life ==
Velázquez was born in Chicago, Illinois. She is of Puerto Rican descent. After graduating from Notre Dame High School for Girls, she earned a Bachelor of Arts in marketing from Columbia College Chicago in 2001.

== Career ==
Velázquez has appeared in print ads, television, and film. Her first acting role was a McDonald's commercial as a drive-through lady. She was originally cast as Fernando Sucre's girlfriend, Maricruz Delgado, in the Fox television series Prison Break but took the role of Catalina Aruca in the NBC series My Name Is Earl instead. Her first film roles were in the movie War with Jet Li and Jason Statham, and in the Oxygen Network original television film Husband for Hire. She was one of the actors in the 2006 monologue show Skirts & Flirts. In 2006, she was named #39 in the annual Maxim Hot 100 list. Velazquez was one of the judges in the Miss Universe 2008 beauty pageant and the host for the Miss USA 2009 pageant.

In 2011 Velazquez appeared in the pilot episode of ABC's reboot of Charlie's Angels as Gloria Martinez, one of the titular "Angels". Her character was killed off after a few minutes of screen time and was replaced by Minka Kelly. She appeared in a recurring role in FX's fantasy football sitcom The League and on The CW's comedy-drama Hart of Dixie.

In 2012, Velazquez appeared in the movie Flight, playing flight attendant Katerina Marquez, a supporting role opposite the main protagonist character played by Denzel Washington. In 2013, Velazquez reunited with her former My Name Is Earl cast members for a guest appearance in Raising Hope. Velazquez joined the main cast of the TNT series Major Crimes, beginning with season two. She plays Emma Rios, a DA, who is a romantic interest of Raymond Cruz's Julio Sanchez. Cruz played Paco, her boyfriend, on My Name Is Earl.

On March 8, 2021, it was announced that Velazquez was to join the cast of ABC's music series Queens, alongside Brandy, Eve and Naturi Naughton. In May 2021, it was announced the show was being picked up for a full series. On October 1, 2021, the first promo single from Queens (“Nasty Girl") was released featuring Velasquez alongside the cast: Brandy, Eve, Naughton and Velazquez. A music video, directed by Tim Story, was released on the same day. This was followed on October 18, 2021, by another rap song from the Queens soundtrack: "The Introduction", which was co-written by Nas. Queens debuted on October 19, 2021, and reviews were largely positive; Caroline Framke of Variety praised the quartet's musical offering, calling their raps “sharp and distinct […] making clear their talent as both individuals and a swaggering collective”. Angie Han of The Hollywood Reporter called the show “Impressive […] lavish […] magic”.

== Personal life ==
Velazquez married talent agent Marc Provissiero in 2005. They divorced in 2011.

== Filmography ==
=== Film ===
Year	Title	Role	Notes
2003	Biker Boyz	Allison	
2003	Chasing Papi	Attractive Woman at Conga Club	
2004	Blast	Luna	
2005	Sueño	Claudia	
2005	House of the Dead 2	Private Maria Rodriguez	
2007	War	Maria	
2009	A Day in the Life	Special Agent Natasha	
2009	All's Faire in Love	Mathilda	
2010	PSA: An Important Message from Women EVERYWHERE	Woman	Short
2010	Byron	Jessica	Short
2012	Guitar Face	Ana Lucia	Short
2012	Flight	Katerina Marquez	
2013	Snitch	Analisa	
2014	My Sister	Linda Gerardi	
2015	Clarity	Carmen	
2016	Ride Along 2	Tasha	
2016	Within	Melanie Alexander	
2016	The Charnel House	Charlotte Reaves	
2016	The Bounce Back	Kristin Peralta	
2016	Aztec Warrior	Lisa	
2018	Sharon 1.2.3.	Sharon #2	
2018	Discarnate	Maya Sanchez	
2019	A World Away	Lyra	

=== Television ===
Year	Title	Role	Notes
2003	The Bold and the Beautiful	Anna	Episode: "Episode #1.4155"
2004	Entourage	Janeen	Episode: "New York"
2004	The Last Ride	JJ Cruz	TV Movie
2005	Las Vegas	Myra Gonzalez	Episode: "Mothwoman"
2005	Hollywood Vice	Marla Flynt	TV Movie
2005–2009	My Name Is Earl	Catalina Aruca	Main cast
2007	Kings of South Beach	Olivia Palacios	TV Movie
2008	Husband for Hire	Lola	TV Movie
2009	CSI: NY	Marcia Vasquez	Episode: "Dead Reckoning"
2009	Gary Unmarried	Sophia	Episode: "Gary and Allison's Friend"
2009–2015	The League	Sofia	Recurring cast
2010	Scrubs	Nicole	Episode: "Our True Lies"
2010	CSI: Miami	Sarah Walker	Episode: "Sudden Death"
2010	Hawaii Five-0	Linda Leon	Episode: "Ko'olauloa"
2011	Charlie's Angels	Gloria Martinez	Episode: "Angel with a Broken Wing"
2011–2012	Hart of Dixie	Didi Ruano	Recurring cast: Season 1
2013	Raising Hope	Valentina	Episode: "Making the Band"
2013	Arrested Development	Rosalita	Episode: "It Gets Better"
2013–2015	Real Husbands of Hollywood	Herself	5 episodes
2013–2017	Major Crimes	D.D.A. Emma Rios	Main cast: season 2; Guest: Seasons 3 and 6
2014	Killer Women	Martina Alvarez	Episode: "La Sicaria"
2014	The Exes	Alessandra	Episode: "The Devil Wears Hanes"
2015	Win, Lose or Love	Nancy Gander	TV Movie
2015	Love Is a Four-Letter Word	Rebecca	TV Movie
2015	Z Nation	Camilla	Episode: "Doc's Angels"
2017–2018	Six	Jackie Ortiz	Main cast
2018	The Guest Book	Anne	Episode: "Tonight You Become a Man"
2021–2022	Queens	Valeria "Butter Pecan" Mendez	Main cast
