= List of Last Man Standing characters =

The following is a list of cast members and characters appearing on the ABC (seasons 1–6) and Fox (season 7–9) sitcom Last Man Standing.

== Overview ==
| Actor | Character | Seasons | | | | | | | | |
| Actor | Character | 1 | 2 | 3 | 4 | 5 | 6 | 7 | 8 | 9 |
|---|---|---|---|---|---|---|---|---|---|---|
| Tim Allen | Mike Baxter | Main | Main | Main | Main | Main | Main | Main | Main | Main |
| Nancy Travis | Vanessa Baxter | Main | Main | Main | Main | Main | Main | Main | Main | Main |
| Alexandra Krosney | Kristin Baxter-Vogelson | Main | | | | | | | | |
| Amanda Fuller | Kristin Baxter-Vogelson | | Main | Main | Main | Main | Main | Main | Main | Main |
| Molly Ephraim | Mandy Baxter-Anderson | Main | Main | Main | Main | Main | Main | | | |
| Molly McCook | Mandy Baxter-Anderson | | | | | | | Main | Main | Main |
| Kaitlyn Dever | Eve Baxter | Main | Main | Main | Main | Main | Main | Recurring | Recurring | Recurring |
| Christoph Sanders | Kyle Anderson | Main | Main | Main | Main | Main | Main | Main | Main | Main |
| Héctor Elizondo | Ed Alzate | Main | Main | Main | Main | Main | Main | Main | Main | Main |
| Evan & Luke Kruntchev | Boyd Baxter | Recurring | | | | | | | | |
| Flynn Morrison | Boyd Baxter | | Main | Main | Main | Main | Main | | | |
| Jet Jurgensmeyer | Boyd Baxter | | | | | | | Main | Recurring | |
| Nick Jonas | Ryan Vogelson | Guest | | | | | | | | |
| Jordan Masterson | Ryan Vogelson | | Recurring | Recurring | Main | Main | Main | Main | Main | Main |
| Jonathan Adams | Chuck Larabee | | Recurring | Recurring | Main | Main | Main | Main | Main | Main |
| Krista Marie Yu | Jen | | | | | | | Main | Main | Main |

== Baxter family tree ==
Unnamed Father | Bonnie+ | Bud
Nichole* | April | Vanessa | Mike
Kristin | Ryan | Mandy | Kyle
Boyd | Evelyn* | Sarah

Jean*
Jim
Eve

- Grey indicates that the character is deceased or passed away during the series.
- *Character is mentioned, but does not appear in an episode.
- +As of Season 8, Bonnie Davidson is married to Ed Alzate.

== Main cast ==
=== Mike Baxter ===
Mike Baxter (portrayed by Tim Allen) is the series' protagonist, Mike is married to Vanessa, and is the father of their three daughters. Mike runs the Outdoor Man webcast and is the executive director of marketing for the Outdoor Man chain of sporting goods stores, with an office based in the Denver "flagship" store. He is a firm believer in traditional American values, is a Protestant and very politically conservative. Mike loves his daughters but is closest to Eve, the youngest and most intelligent and athletic daughter, and whose political opinions and interests mirror his own. He is proud of her ability to excel at anything she tries, including schoolwork, hunting, and sports. Mike often finds himself warring with Outdoor Man's young employee Kyle (who later becomes his son-in-law), and with Ryan, his atheist and politically liberal son-in-law married to his oldest daughter, and the father of his grandson Boyd. Prior to the events of the series, Mike traveled extensively for photo shoots of various outdoor adventures to promote Outdoor Man gear. As the series begins, Outdoor Man has shifted its advertising to a primarily digital platform, and Mike now mostly works out of his Denver office. The video blog or "vlog" that Mike does for Outdoor Man is frequently used as a vehicle to express his political and social views. Mike is a graduate of the University of Michigan, and an amateur radio operator using the call sign KA0XTT. Mike drives a green 1956 Ford F100, which he lovingly works on throughout the series. The truck is stolen in the series finale.

=== Vanessa Baxter ===
Vanessa Baxter (née Davidson; portrayed by Nancy Travis) is Mike's wife. Vanessa is a geologist working in the energy industry for a company that does hydraulic fracturing, or "fracking". In season four, Vanessa becomes frustrated with her job (as well as constant harassment from Ryan) and decides to go back to college to become a high-school science teacher. After being laid off due to budget cuts, Vanessa begins her own tutoring business. Vanessa was ambiguous in her political views until season five, when she announced her support of Hillary Clinton for president, believing it will advance women's causes. She is frequently shown drinking copious amounts of wine, and is also frequently mocked by Mike and her daughters about it. She is a graduate of Ohio State University with a Master of Science degree in Physics and a PhD in Geology, and thus advanced farther in college than did Mike. She endlessly brags about her alma mater (which she tries to bully Eve into attending, despite her daughter's ambition to enter the U.S. military), and her extensive history of boyfriends (all of whom dumped her). Vanessa often makes attempts to be politically correct, but when trying to relate to people of other races, she generally causes humiliation for herself. Despite this, she and her African-American neighbor Carol Larabee eventually become good friends. Vanessa's humor involves punning, which amuses her greatly but irritates Mike and the girls to no end. Vanessa and Eve do not connect well (mainly because Eve has interests, hobbies and beliefs that are nearly identical to Mike's), and if Eve has a problem, Vanessa's forced conversation is generally torture for her, one of these intrusions costing her a boyfriend. In Season 8, Vanessa all but abandons her tutoring business (just as Mike buys her an office) to run for a state assembly position. She drops out of the race when her opponent receives the school board endorsement Vanessa coveted, but not before getting her main competition to embrace her ideas. In her home life, Vanessa is ecstatic to learn she's getting two new grandbabies (albeit a few months apart), but gets burned for trying to uncover a secret Kristin and Ryan have entrusted to Mike.

=== Kristin Baxter ===
Kristin Beth Baxter Vogelson (portrayed by Alexandra Krosney in season 1, Amanda Fuller in season 2-9) is the oldest daughter. Krosney portrayed Kristin in the show's first season (despite being nearly two years younger than Molly Ephraim, who played her younger sister Mandy); Krosney was replaced by Fuller before season two for unspecified creative reasons. Kristin, unlike her father, espouses liberal political views and her views with regard to Christianity seem ambiguous, however she does enjoy hunting, fishing, and other sporting activities, like her father. She is also pro-gun rights. During her senior year in high school, Kristin became pregnant with her son Boyd. She was a single mother living in the Baxter home until she moved out in the season-two finale. She begins to reconcile with Boyd's father Ryan Vogelson in season three and the two get married between seasons four and five. Kristin worked at a diner until landing a job at an upscale restaurant run by a former co-worker at the end of season two. In season four, she becomes the manager of the new wild game restaurant opened by Outdoor Man. Kristin tends to work extra hard in this new job to prove she did not get the position through nepotism, despite Mike and Ed frequently telling her she was qualified. At the start of season 8, Kristin announced that she is expecting her second child, and only trusted Mike with the secret of it being a girl. Amanda Fuller directed the 18th episode of season 8 ("Garage Band"). Kristin gave birth to her daughter, whom she and Ryan named Evelyn (after Eve) between seasons 8 and 9. After the Season 9 time jump, the pandemic-stricken economy forces the Outdoor Man Grill to close (hopefully temporarily), though Kristin manages to transfer her staff into the store, avoiding any layoffs and saving recruiting costs. Impressed by this, Mike decides Kristin will be his successor as head of Outdoor Man when he eventually retires.

=== Mandy Baxter ===
Amanda Elaine "Mandy" Baxter-Anderson (portrayed by Molly Ephraim in season 1-6, Molly McCook in season 7-9) is the middle daughter: Although she is not the best academically (she has a penchant for cutting class, ignoring homework and flirting for better grades), she excels in social situations. Interested in fashion and little else, she was one of the most popular girls at her high school, having dated or slept with nearly every male student, and a few teachers, which may be the only way she ever graduated. Mandy is very confident and creative, demonstrating traits found in her father. She is also lazy, conceited, promiscuous, insulting, and delinquent – she drinks underage, ignores all driving laws, shoplifts from Outdoor Man, has been caught staying out all night, and there area many implications that she has smoked cannabis – but occasionally she can display moments of generosity and caring. (She flew a relative of Blanca's home from Afghanistan one Christmas, gave a homeless woman a makeover so she could ace a job interview, and listed big sister Kristin as her hero in her college applications.) Her loose morals and willingness to break all rules paints Mandy as the daughter most like Vanessa, and in no good way. Despite this, Mandy shockingly started dating "nice guy" Kyle in Season 2. As of Season 3, she attends a local community college and works at the diner where Kristin used to work. It has been implied that she has ADHD when she takes some of Boyd's ADD medication and starts doing well on her college tests. Later that same season, she begins an online clothing business, selling her self-designed fashions which she assembles in the basement of her parents' house. Kyle asks her to marry him in Season 5, the 100th episode. She marries Kyle in Season 6, and they lived in the Baxter home until the finale of season 7. Up until she turned 21, a running gag on the show was Mike, Vanessa, and occasionally Kristin snatching glasses of alcohol out of Mandy's hand, usually followed by Mandy making a lame excuse. Ephraim was replaced by Molly McCook prior to the season 7 revival on FOX due to Ephraim choosing not to return. As an in-joke for the season 7 premiere, Kyle finally noticed that Mandy got taller and did not comment on her hair being blonde. Since her marriage, Mandy has done everything possible to avoid conceiving a child, but never bothering to tell husband Kyle that she's not ready for motherhood. That changes at the start of season 8, when she confides that she and Kyle are trying for real to conceive. Also in season 8, Mandy gets an opportunity to design a new casual clothing line for Outdoor Man. The penultimate episode of this season reveals that Mandy is pregnant. In the season 9 premiere, it is revealed that during the time jump Mandy had a daughter named Sarah (born via midwife in Mike and Vanessa's bed) and that she, Kyle, and Sarah moved back in with Mike and Vanessa. They later moved into Kristin and Ryan's garage apartment.

=== Eve Baxter ===
Eve Baxter (portrayed by Kaitlyn Dever; series regular, seasons 1–6; recurring, seasons 7–9) is the youngest daughter. Eve is intelligent and athletic, and generally has the same interests as Mike, including camping, sports, guns, and the military. She also has conservative views like Mike. She is Mike's favorite daughter, and excels at her hobbies. She frequently outplays the boys in soccer and makes the school's football team as their placekicker. She is well aware of being the favorite over her two sisters, but does not lord it over them (at least not Kristin, but Mandy's endless stream of idiocy leaves her wide open for ridicule). Eve also shares her father's sense of humor, and her sardonic wit is frequently directed at her brainless sister Mandy and hypocrite brother-in-law Ryan. Eve is an excellent student, whose only weak subject is art, though she did have to change math classes to escape a difficult, misogynist, high-standard teacher. Eve is a member of Army Junior ROTC and works toward gaining admittance to West Point. Her attempt to do so is unsuccessful, which seriously depresses her, so in season six, Eve decides to take a "personal year" rather than immediately attend college. She spends some of this time singing and playing guitar for money, but this proves to be unfruitful. She had more success working at Outdoor Man and volunteering for a Habitat for Humanity-style local charity. During her gap year, Eve applies to the Air Force Academy in nearby Colorado Springs (without telling either parent), and is accepted. Over her mother's objections, Eve chooses to enlist in the Academy. In season seven, Cadet 4th Class Baxter is only a recurring character as she is now enrolled at the Academy (this was due to Dever's commitments to the Netflix miniseries Unbelievable). Due to Dever's continued busy schedule, Eve is again a recurring character in seasons 8 and 9. In the series finale, Eve reveals she has just flown a jet at supersonic speed for the first time.

=== Kyle Anderson ===
Kyle Anderson (portrayed by Christoph Sanders) is a young employee at Outdoor Man. Kyle is universally recognized as a nice guy, almost to a fault. Kyle idolizes Mike, having grown up without a father figure, but Mike is mostly irritated by Kyle's personality and behavior. Kyle takes care of his never-seen grandmother who has dementia and it is implied he grew up in her home. His estranged mother dies in season six, leaving Kyle with mixed feelings over how to deal with it. Kyle is often oblivious to social cues and is slow to catch on to the events happening around him. Kyle dated Kristin in season one and started dating Mandy in season two before proposing in season five, and marrying Mandy in season six. Kyle was shuffled from role to role at Outdoor Man, sometimes messing up due to his trusting nature. In season seven, Mike and Ed experiment with putting him in an HR role, and find that Kyle's combination of people skills and strict adherence to company guidelines makes him a good fit for the position. As of season seven, he has yet to level his mother's trailer or break ground on building his own home, although he and Mandy moved into an apartment at the end of that season. Kyle mentions in season 7 that he and Mandy are trying to conceive a baby, unaware that Mandy has reservations about it and has yet to discontinue birth control. That changes at the start of season 8, when Mandy confides that she and Kyle are trying for real to conceive, and they reveal that Mandy is finally pregnant in the penultimate episode of the season. Also in season 8, just as Mike has him ready for advancement in Outdoor Man's HR department (due to his excelling at conflict resolution), Kyle is manipulated by Reverend Paul to enroll in seminary college with the goal of becoming a minister. Kyle becomes closer to Ryan, his brother-in-law, when the two discover they have a mutual passion for superhero comics, the two later running a podcast on the subject.

=== Ed Alzate ===
Edward A. "Ed" Alzate (portrayed by Héctor Elizondo) is Mike's longtime business partner. Ed started a bait and tackle shop many years ago and hired Mike, who helped turn the shop into the 20-store Outdoor Man chain. Ed is perhaps fifteen or twenty years older than Mike, but the two men bond over similar outdoor hobbies and shared conservative values. He is of Basque heritage, something which he takes great pride in and brings up whenever possible. Mike regularly talks to Ed about the happenings in his home and occasionally seeks advice. Having been divorced four times, Ed's suggestions on relationships are rarely helpful. Despite his status as Outdoor Man "founder", Ed has very little business sense (often following fly-by-night promotional trends) and sometimes lacks tact with female customers and employees. Thus, Outdoor Man's success is mainly due to Mike's intelligence and ability to resolve conflicts (sometimes requiring him to pull Ed's foot out of his mouth). In season 9's "Parent-normal Activity", Ed mentions that Mike once tried to buy into the business, but Ed refused the money, saying he made Mike a partner because he desperately needed his smarts and work ethic. Ed has five daughters (and a war baby). Ed is a Vietnam veteran, although he saw no combat in Vietnam, stating that he was a clerk in Saigon. This helped him bond with Mike's father, Bud Baxter, a fellow Vietnam Vet. Ed continues to help fellow veterans at the local Veterans of Foreign Wars hall with their Veteran Affairs paperwork. Ed is also a recurring target for jokes about his age and lack of hair, most often from Mike. Early in Season 7, Ed announces his retirement from Outdoor Man, but still often comes in when activities with people his own age bore him. Also in Season 7, he meets, falls for, and becomes engaged to Vanessa's mother Bonnie whom he marries early in Season 8.

=== Boyd Baxter ===
Boyd Baxter (portrayed by Evan and Luke Kruntchev in season 1, Flynn Morrison in season 2-6, Jet Jurgensmeyer in season 7-8) is son of Kristin and Ryan. Mike enjoys spending quality time with his grandson Boyd and affectionately views him as the son he never had. Mike and Ryan often clash on how he should be raised. Boyd enjoys activities encouraged by both his father and grandfather.

The character was age-advanced approximately three years between seasons 1 and 2.

=== Ryan Vogelson ===
Ryan Vogelson (portrayed by Nick Jonas in a season 1 episode, Jordan Masterson in season 2-9) is Boyd's Canadian father. Though Ryan initially fled the country when Kristin fell pregnant, he returned five years later to be involved in Boyd's upbringing and eventually the two reconciled and got engaged at the end of season 3. Ryan holds liberal views, both politically and philosophically, and he and Mike routinely clash over their fundamentally opposing values, especially when it comes to parenting. Ryan wishes to raise his son without religion, hunting culture and national pride, however, neither Mike nor Kristin agree with this approach. His vegan diet, views on discipline, love for all liberal policies, atheism, hatred for American patriotism, and what Mike sees as his oversensitivity are an affront to Mike's beliefs, but Ryan generally enjoys being a thorn in Mike's side, and infuriates the entire family when he mocks their belief in God. Ryan also infuriates the entire family by trying to force his will on Boyd's elementary school, trying to ban things like dodgeball, soda, and worst of all The Pledge of Allegiance. On rare occasions, Ryan and Mike agree on what is best for Boyd, but this usually puts them at odds with Kristin or Vanessa, if not both. Mike comes to reluctantly respect and like his son-in-law for standing up for what he believes, and for being a loving husband and father. At the beginning of Season 7, Ryan threatens to run back to Canada with Kristin and Boyd over his hatred of President Trump's leadership, until Mike encourages him to apply for U.S. citizenship. Ryan is the personification of a deadbeat for the first two seasons, then takes a job at an ice factory and later becomes a truck driver. In Season 5, he quits his job when Boyd starts having trouble at school and begins home-schooling his son, but by the end of Season 6 he is afraid to let Boyd resume public school or reenter the work force. Upon Bud Baxter's passing early in season 7, Ryan assumes ownership and operation of the marijuana store, with Mike's blessing. Being a business owner actually gets Ryan to agree with Mike on one particular topic: that government regulations make it very difficult to run a business. Ryan later rents the upper floor of the marijuana store to Mandy and Kyle as an apartment, becoming their landlord. Ryan becomes closer to Kyle when the two discover they have a mutual passion for superhero comics, the two later running a podcast on the subject. In the final season, the marijuana store is bought by a large conglomerate and Ryan accepts a job in the company's corporate offices.

=== Chuck Larabee ===
Chuck Larabee (portrayed by Jonathan Adams; regular, seasons 4–9; recurring, seasons 2–3) is Mike and Vanessa's neighbor. a retired U.S. Marine, and a veteran of the first Gulf War who runs a private security business and later takes charge of security for the Denver Outdoor Man. Chuck is an African-American who grew up in Minneapolis, and often jokes with Mike about racial stereotypes. The two regularly exchange barbs as if they don't like each other. In reality, they are good friends, despite being unwilling to admit it. Vanessa sees through their heated exchanges, often telling them to "get a room". Chuck's typical response to something or someone that exasperates him is, "not cool". Chuck is married to Carol and they have a son, Brandon, who is a year or two older than Eve. Like Mike, Chuck enjoys repairing and restoring cars, something he learned by assisting his father for many years. In season 7, he, Joe and Mike start a side business rebuilding and selling classic cars with the help of Ed, which continues through the final two seasons.

=== Jen ===
Jen (portrayed by Krista Marie Yu) is Vanessa's foreign-exchange student from Hong Kong who moves in with the Baxters starting in season 7. At first, she is shy and goes along with everything Mike wants, but Mike challenges her to be confident and to stand up for what she wants. As opposed to the Baxter girls, Jen is very passive-aggressive, often giving backhanded compliments or subtly dropping slams against what she perceives as the foolishness of Vanessa and her daughters (mainly Mandy). As of Season 8, Jen is a high school senior and begins kissing up to Vanessa at every opportunity. It's later revealed that Jen is interested in geology, like Vanessa, and has applied to attend the Rocky Mountain Geological Institute. After graduating high school, Jen begins working as a busgirl at the Outdoor Man Grill to earn some money before leaving for college. By Season 9, she has returned to Hong Kong, but her father sends her back to the Baxters for another year, concerned about her safety as she has inspired him to begin speaking out against China's communist regime. In the season 9 episode "Butterfly Effect", Jen starts a new job at Outdoor Man as an administrative assistant.

== Recurring cast ==
- Robert Forster as Bud Baxter (seasons 1, 3–4, 7), Mike's widower father, Kristin, Mandy, and Eve's grandfather, and Boyd's great-grandfather who is initially in the construction business, but later opens a marijuana store ("Bud's Buds") after it becomes legal in Colorado. In season 7, it is revealed that Bud died of a heart attack. (Forster would die of brain cancer a year later). Ryan, lacking a job after he stopped home-schooling Boyd, takes over the pot shop.
- Christina Moore as April (seasons 1 & 3), Vanessa's air-headed and immature younger sister and Kristin, Mandy, and Eve's aunt. She is always asking for money and once wanted to have a child despite having no means of supporting it.
- Danielle Bisutti as Michelle (season 1), Vanessa's pseudo-friend and next-door neighbor. She is a local weather girl who acquires most of her data from a free phone app.
- Erika Alexander (seasons 2–6) and Tisha Campbell (seasons 7–8) as Carol Larabee, Chuck's wife and Mike and Vanessa's neighbor who becomes Vanessa's best friend. Vanessa often goes overboard trying to act racially open-minded around her, but usually ends up with her foot in her mouth, annoying Carol. In season 6, Carol accepts a year-long job in California, leaving Chuck behind in Denver. She returns in season 7 and the two renew their wedding vows.
- Carla Jimenez as Blanca Alvarez (seasons 2–4), the Baxters' Guatemalan-born housekeeper who also helps Mandy with her fashion business. The Baxters were happy to celebrate with Blanca after she was sworn in as an American citizen. Her disappearance has never been explained.
- Sarah Gilman as Cammy Harris (seasons 2–6), Eve's soccer teammate and extremely chatty best friend. It is hinted by Mandy in season 4's "Restaurant Opening" that Cammy has a full-on crush for Eve that goes beyond friendship. This leads to Eve avoiding Cammy for a while, though Cammy later insists she would never do anything to make Eve uncomfortable. Cammy also briefly led a three-piece band (with Eve on guitar) called the "Cammy Harris Experience". When Cammy and drummer Nigel chickened out at their first gig, Eve performed a solo song that impressed both Mike and the club owner.
- Jonathan Taylor Thomas as John Baker (seasons 2–3), Kristin's boss at the upscale Highlands restaurant. Thomas also had a cameo as "Randy" (a nod to his Home Improvement character) in the season 4 episode "Helen Potts" with fellow Home Improvement co-star Patricia Richardson. After John Baker was dropped from the show, Thomas directed multiple episodes of the series.
- Tye Sheridan as Justin (seasons 3–4), Eve's fellow Jr. ROTC member and football teammate who becomes her boyfriend. The two break up in season 4.
- Zachary Gordon as Andrew (season 3), Eve's nerdy classmate who worships her and desperately wants to be her boyfriend. He became her prom date when Justin pushed her too far.
- Joely Fisher as Wendi Gracin (seasons 3–5), Ed's obnoxious younger girlfriend, whom he meets near the end of season three. Ed routinely has to put her in her place, particularly when she shows up at the store and tries to get involved in running his business (her agenda usually involves denigrating Mike). Wendi ends up pregnant with Ed's only son, a fact that he was joyful for, but loses the baby partway through the pregnancy, which was one of reasons why both of them began to drift apart. Wendi and Ed break up offscreen between Seasons 4 and 5, but the two patch things up and reunite and become engaged. When the series returned for a seventh season, Wendi was not seen or mentioned. It is believed that she and Ed broke up and never went through with their plans to marry, given that Ed dates and later becomes engaged to Vanessa's mother, Bonnie, during that season.
- Bill Engvall as Reverend Paul (seasons 5–9), the new pastor of the Baxter family's church, whose most prominent skill seems to be hustling donations out of Mike (Nancy Travis played Engvall's wife Susan on The Bill Engvall Show). Reverend Paul frequently frustrates Mike and seems to enjoy it. In Season 8, Paul convinced Kyle to enter seminary school rather than becoming the HR manager of Outdoor Man, and he also stole Mandy off the Baxter family bowling team.
- Jay Leno as Joe Leonard (seasons 5–9), a semi-retired auto technician from whom Vanessa buys a classic car for Mike. Joe later works in the repair shop at Outdoor Man, servicing products like ATVs, snowmobiles and boat engines. Joe enjoys throwing humorous insults at Mike, often teaming up with Chuck in these exchanges. He is depicted as lonely, living with several cats, and is very close to his mother. Joe supplements his income as an Uber driver.
- Travis Tope as Rob (season 6), Eve's boyfriend who is studying criminal justice at CU Boulder. He's a recovering alcoholic, which worries Mike and Vanessa when they first meet him. Shortly before Eve left for the Air Force Academy, Vanessa's nosy meddling ruined their relationship.
- Susan Sullivan as Bonnie Davidson (seasons 7–8), Vanessa's mother, Kristin, Mandy, and Eve's grandmother, and Boyd's great-grandmother who later marries Ed.
- Sophia McKinlay as Sarah Anderson (season 9), Kyle and Mandy's daughter who was born sometime after season 8, but is three years old following a time jump at the start of season 9.

== Notable guest stars ==
Several notable guest stars have appeared throughout the series, including appearances made by cast members of Tim Allen's previous series, Home Improvement.

- Paul F. Tompkins as Chester McAllister, a phony child-proofing expert that Mike and Vanessa enlisted
- Cassandra Peterson as Elvira
- Nick Jonas as Ryan Vogelson in his first appearance (see above)
- Tony Hawk as himself
- Jamie-Lynn Sigler as Gabriella Alzate, one of Ed's five daughters, who like Mike, has a degree in marketing.
- Andrew Daly as Mr. Peckem, a corrupt city inspector
- Kim Kardashian as herself
- Tony Stewart as himself
- Mike Rowe as Jimmy Baxter, Mike's younger brother, Kristin, Mandy, and Eve's uncle, and Boyd's great-uncle who worked for their father Bud's construction company and seems to resent Mike for leaving the family business
- Frankie Muniz as Richard, a young banker and Kristin's former high school classmate who has an unresolved crush on her
- Melanie Paxson as Liz, Vanessa's friend on the board of school volunteers
- Richard Karn as Bill McKendree, an architect who has a work history with Outdoor Man; Karn portrayed Al Borland, co-worker and friend to Tim Allen's character on Home Improvement
- Si Robertson as Uncle Ray
- Willie Robertson as Brody (along with Uncle Ray, Mike's "two best customers")
- Michael Gross as Mr. Hardin (a.k.a. "Hard-Ass"), a high school math teacher who holds unobtainable standards for his students, including Eve
- Patricia Richardson as Helen Potts, the Baxters' widowed neighbor who initially clashes with Mike, but bonds with Vanessa, and later with Mike, who reminds her a lot of her deceased husband. Richardson portrayed Jill Taylor, the wife of Tim Allen's character in Home Improvement
- Jere Burns as Victor Vogelson, Ryan's estranged Canadian father and Boyd's grandfather who a compulsive liar and philanderer
- Blake Clark as Clark, the owner of a club in which Eve performed. Clark also played Harry Turner, owner of the hardware store on Home Improvement
- Robin Roberts as Teresa, a Persian Gulf War veteran who owns a collection of model tanks that Mike covets
- Reba McEntire as Billie Cassidy, Mike's former girlfriend and renowned mountain climber
- Brad Leland as Wayne Sizemore, a deranged conspiracy theorist and winner of the "Meet Outdoor Man" contest (#125)
- Joey Luthman as Nigel, the bandmate of Eve Baxter and Cammy Harris in the season 5 episode 16 titled "Eve's Band"
- Terry Bradshaw as himself
- Melissa Peterman as Celia "CeCe" Powers, a maniacal sales rep for an Outdoor Man supplier who tries to take over Mandy's clothing business. She later goes on a date with Joe Leonard
- Jeff Dunham as himself, he once got into a feud with Ed
