= Last Man Standing season 8 =

TV sitcom season

Last Man Standing
- Season 8
- Promotional poster for the season
- Starring: Tim Allen; Nancy Travis; Amanda Fuller; Molly McCook; Christoph Sanders; Jordan Masterson; Jonathan Adams; Héctor Elizondo; Krista Marie Yu
- No. of episodes: 21

Release
- Original network: Fox
- Original release: January 2 – April 30, 2020

Season chronology
- ← Previous; Season 7 Next → Season 9

The eighth season of the American sitcom Last Man Standing premiered on January 2, 2020, with two back-to-back episodes. Fox renewed the series for an eighth season in April 2019. The season contained twenty-one episodes and concluded on April 30, 2020.

The series continues to center around the work and home lives of Mike Baxter, his coworkers, and his family. It stars Tim Allen as Mike Baxter, alongside Nancy Travis, Amanda Fuller, Molly McCook, Christoph Sanders, Jordan Masterson, Jonathan Adams, Héctor Elizondo, and Krista Marie Yu. Former series regulars Kaitlyn Dever and Jet Jurgensmeyer both guest-starred during the season.

The season premiere, "No Parental Guidance", was watched by 5.21 million viewers, while the season finale, "How You Like Them Pancakes?", was watched by 4.25 million viewers.

== Cast ==
=== Main ===
- Tim Allen as Mike Baxter
- Nancy Travis as Vanessa Baxter
- Amanda Fuller as Kristin Beth Baxter
- Molly McCook as Amanda Elaine "Mandy" Baxter-Anderson
- Christoph Sanders as Kyle Anderson
- Jordan Masterson as Ryan Vogelson
- Jonathan Adams as Chuck Larabee
- Héctor Elizondo as Edward "Ed" Alzate
- Krista Marie Yu as Jen

=== Recurring ===
- Jay Leno as Joe Leonard
- Susan Sullivan as Bonnie
- Tisha Campbell as Carol Larabee

=== Guest stars ===
- Kaitlyn Dever as Eve Baxter
- Terry Bradshaw as Terry
- Jet Jurgensmeyer as Boyd Baxter
- Bill Engvall as Reverend Paul
- Melissa Peterman as Celia "CeCe" Powers
- François Chau as Henry
- Lauren Tom as Fiona

== Episodes ==
The number in the "No. overall" column refers to the episode's number within the overall series, whereas the number in the "No. in season" column refers to the episode's number within this particular season. "Production code" refers to the order in which the episodes were produced while "U.S. viewers (millions)" refers to the number of viewers in the U.S. in millions who watched the episode as it was aired.

No. overall	No. in season	Title	Directed by	Written by	Original release date	Prod. code	U.S. viewers (millions)
153	1	"No Parental Guidance"	Andy Cadiff	Kevin Abbott	January 2, 2020	8ATP01	5.21
Vanessa is depressed now that all of her daughters are out of the house. Mike organizes a family dinner to lift her spirits, wherein Kristin announces she's pregnant. Mandy, who is now trying to conceive a child with Kyle, gets angry and storms out. Though Vanessa wants to mediate the dispute, Mike insists she's done a good enough job as a mother that the girls can work it out themselves. Mandy reveals to Kristin that she's not mad about her getting pregnant, only that she didn't share the news with her first like she always used to do.
154	2	"Wrench in the Works"	Andy Cadiff	Jon Haller	January 2, 2020	8ATP02	5.21
After completing the renovation of a 1965 Chevrolet Corvair with Chuck, Mike tells Vanessa the two had so much fun that he's thinking of starting a side business with Chuck restoring and reselling classic cars. Chuck is all for it but soon irritates Mike by inviting Joe to be part of their business. Meanwhile, Vanessa and Kristin notice a chore chart on Mandy's apartment refrigerator, but Mandy reveals she lets Kyle do everything "because he enjoys it". When Kyle later tells Vanessa that he likes pleasing Mandy and doesn't mind the extra chores, Vanessa convinces him that he may come to resent Mandy for it.
155	3	"Yours, Wine, and Ours"	Victor Gonzalez	Mike Teverbaugh & Linda Teverbaugh	January 9, 2020	8ATP03	4.35
With the house empty, Mike opts for more "me time" instead of doing couples things with Vanessa. However, he's soon reminded by Bonnie of how married couples can drift apart after they become empty nesters. Elsewhere, Kyle and Ryan mourn the death of their favorite graphic novelist. Mandy and Kristin think their men are being a bit childish, but eventually do something unexpected for the guys.
156	4	"You’ve Got Male (or Female)"	Victor Gonzalez	Kevin Hench	January 9, 2020	8ATP04	4.35
Kristin entrusts Mike with the doctor's envelope that shows the gender of her unborn child, knowing that Vanessa will never be able to keep the secret. While planning the gender reveal party, Mike uses the opportunity to drive Vanessa crazy. Meanwhile, Ed asks Chuck and Joe to help him remodel a room he's preparing in his home especially for Bonnie, who is moving in soon. Chuck and Joe are then taken aback when Ed wants to fill the room with creepy dolls.
157	5	"The Office"	Victor Gonzalez	Pat Bullard	January 16, 2020	8ATP06	4.79
Mike gives Vanessa an office for the third anniversary of her tutoring business. However, after conversing with Carol Larabee, Vanessa feels guilty that her business is thriving while funds are being cut from the public school system. Mike then surprisingly suggests that Vanessa run for a state assembly position. Elsewhere, Kyle reminds Kristin and Mandy that neither of them has completed his Outdoor Man employee orientation program.
158	6	"Mysterious Ways"	Victor Gonzalez	Matt Berry	January 16, 2020	8ATP05	4.79
Just as Mike and Ed decide that Kyle is the best candidate to fill a Regional HR position, Reverend Paul is so wowed by Kyle's guest sermon that he thinks Kyle should go to seminary school and work to become a pastor. Meanwhile, after chastising Jen for spending so much time playing her new VR game, Vanessa becomes addicted to it herself.
159	7	"Bedtime Story"	Robbie Countryman	Josh Greenberg	January 23, 2020	8ATP07	4.45
Unable to sleep due to Vanessa's loud snoring, Mike acts on advice from Chuck and Ed that he should sleep in a separate room now that the kids are out of the house. Not wanting to hurt his wife's feelings, Mike sleeps in another room under the guise of helping Vanessa and has a great night's sleep. However, Vanessa soon figures out the issue and gets Mike to tell her she snores. She insists she can stop snoring but has a horrible night's sleep trying to do so. Elsewhere, Ryan and Kristin ask Kyle and Mandy to be godparents for their future baby girl. A thrilled Mandy takes on the task of designing a pink-and-princess nursery, which leads to an argument with Ryan, who insists on a gender-neutral room.
160	8	"Romancing the Stone"	Robbie Countryman	Mackenzie Yeager	January 30, 2020	8ATP08	3.94
With Bonnie and Ed's wedding day upon the family, Vanessa stresses over giving her mom the perfect wedding after feeling like Bonnie's first wedding was ruined due to being pregnant with her. Complicating matters, Mike is snowed in at his cabin in the mountains and Eve cannot get time off from an Air Force Academy training program, forcing a thrilled Jen to take over as a bridesmaid. Hours away from the wedding, Ed is hospitalized due to a painful kidney stone, causing the Baxter family and friends to improvise.
161	9	"Girls Rock"	Dave Cove	Claire Mulaney	February 6, 2020	8ATP09	3.98
While Vanessa sweats out Jen's application to the Rocky Mountain Geological Institute, Jen assists Mike as he prepares his next vlog and soon tells Vanessa she is considering a marketing degree. She then disappoints both Mike and Vanessa by telling them she wants to be a social media influencer, but the online video she creates warms both of their hearts. Elsewhere, Ed and Chuck accuse Kristin of playing on "pregnancy sympathy" to get bigger tips at Outdoor Man Grill.
162	10	"Break Out the Campaign"	Tim Allen	Jordan Black	February 13, 2020	8ATP10	3.66
In preparing to give a speech announcing her candidacy for state assembly, Vanessa hires then fires both Carol Larabee and Mike as campaign managers because their ideas for a speech don't align with hers. Vanessa decides to make her official announcement on the steps of the school where her children and Jen attended, and just speak from the heart. Meanwhile, Ed gives Kyle an expensive gold watch as a gift, explaining its meaning in Basque heritage. Kyle is afraid to wear it anywhere, so he buys a knock-off on the street and tries to pretend it's the real thing.
163	11	"Baked Sale"	Andy Cadiff	Jenny Yang	February 20, 2020	8ATP11	3.65
Jen collaborates with Mike on the best strategy to sell baked goods for her geology club, with the hopes of winning a trip to the Grand Canyon. They find the perfect location, right in front of Bud's Buds, but Carol Larabee arrives and tells Jen the school will not permit them to sell there. In reality, Carol is acting on behalf of Vanessa, who is worried the "baked sale" might negatively affect her campaign. Mike then has to teach Jen a lesson that a good capitalist still needs a conscience. At Outdoor Man, Joe makes Kyle question his choice of college. Ed, Chuck, and others are then shocked to learn that Joe was once an English professor and authored a popular children's book under a pen name.
164	12	"I'm with Cupid"	Andy Cadiff	Jacob Brown	February 27, 2020	8ATP13	4.10
When Vanessa hints that the reason Joe is hanging around the Baxter house so much is that he's lonely, Mike plays Cupid and sets up Joe with his boisterous supplier rep CeCe Powers. Vanessa is skeptical that two people so different can hit it off, but she soon learns that CeCe's bark is worse than her bite. Meanwhile, Kyle becomes jealous when Jen is a guest on Ryan's graphic novel podcast and takes over the whole show, and gets even angrier when Ryan secretly invites Jen back for a follow-up show.
165	13	"Student Doubt"	Leslie Kolins Small	Pat Bullard	March 5, 2020	8ATP12	3.52
Mandy enlists help from Vanessa and Jen to coach Kyle on how to study better, knowing Kyle is too proud to admit he's struggling with his college classes. Meanwhile, Chuck and Ed reveal to Mike their superstitious method of deciding what cars to purchase for their restoration business.
166	14	"This Too Shall Bass"	Andy Cadiff	Erin Berry	March 12, 2020	8ATP14	3.67
With the 25th anniversary of Outdoor Man's "Big Ass Bass" festival approaching, Mike tries to convince Bonnie to let Ed stay home instead of going to their planned art festival in Connecticut. Bonnie eventually admits she doesn't want to force Ed to go with her, she just feels out of place with Ed's hunting and fishing crowd. Meanwhile, a very pregnant Kristin puts Mandy in charge of the Bass festival Kiddie Corral, which turns out to be a much bigger task than Mandy envisioned.
167	15	"Chili Chili Bang Bang"	Victor Gonzalez	Jon Haller	March 19, 2020	8ATP15	4.70
With this year's Outdoor Man chili cook-off having an Asian theme, Mike solicits Jen's help so he can beat last year's champion, Chuck. The pending victory is bittersweet when Chuck announces he's not submitting a chili dish this year, and Mike learns the reason why. Meanwhile, Kristin and Mandy have grown tired of their weekly lunches with Vanessa, so they suggest she dine with Ryan and Kyle instead.
168	16	"Along Came a Spider"	Victor Gonzalez	Ed Yeager	March 26, 2020	8ATP16	4.40
When Jen uses Vanessa's laptop to look up information on what her class tarantula eats, she inadvertently finds a letter Vanessa is writing to announce she's dropping out of the state assembly race. After Mike asks why, Vanessa explains that she doesn't think her message is being heard, so Mike vows to do something about it. At Outdoor Man, Ed asks Chuck and Kyle to go in with him on an expensive gift for Kristin's baby, saying each man's contribution will be proportional to what they earn. This leads Chuck and Kyle to ponder which one of them has a higher salary.
169	17	"Keep the Change"	Victor Gonzalez	Mike Teverbaugh & Linda Teverbaugh	April 2, 2020	8ATP17	4.10
When Mike and Vanessa hear that Jen has not asked her father to attend her high school graduation, they secretly invite him to town. They then learn that Jen can't stand her father's new girlfriend, Fiona Lauren Tom who came along with him. Meanwhile, Chuck, Kyle, Mandy, Kristin, and Ryan take sides over the popular "Yanny or Laurel" online audio clip.
170	18	"Garage Band"	Amanda Fuller	Josh Greenberg	April 9, 2020	8ATP18	4.16
After the guys agree to publish an online article about their car restoration business, Joe feels slighted because Chuck and Mike get far more mentions in the article than he does. He quits, which initially pleases Mike and Chuck, but they soon realize their group is missing a certain dynamic. Meanwhile, Ryan takes a personality test that Kyle is doing for a college project, and he lies on his answers to represent himself as way more "chill" than he really is. After the Baxters and Jen rib him for his dishonesty, Ryan is hurt, but soon comes to understand they like him the way he is.
171	19	"The Big LeBaxter"	Andy Cadiff	Erin Berry	April 16, 2020	8ATP19	3.86
Mike's penchant for winning takes over after Reverend Paul steals Mandy, the best bowler on Team Baxter, to bowl for the Holy Rollers in the church league. Both Ryan and Jen claim to be great bowlers, getting Mike excited again, but it turns out both misrepresented their talents. Ryan assumed he'd be good because the Canadian game of curling is similar, and Jen owns up that her "eight or nine strikes a game" claim was in virtual bowling. Meanwhile, after ribbing Mike for wanting to win over just having fun, Vanessa becomes irritated when another candidate for State Assembly earns the endorsement from the education community. She drops out of the race but does get an offer to be the education liaison for the other candidate. Also, Kristin and Chuck realize they are hurting Ed's feelings by sharing their "old people" jokes at work.
172	20	"Extrasensory Deception"	Victor Gonzalez	Story by : Tommy Wright; Teleplay by : Brett Isaacson & TJ Martell	April 23, 2020	8ATP20	4.14
Mike is a guest on Ryan's podcast, wherein he professes his interest in the darker side of the modern superhero. This irritates Kyle and ultimately leads to him leaking information to Mike that Mandy is pregnant. Kyle asks Mike to not tell Vanessa yet, but it doesn't matter -- Mandy has already shared the news with her mom. Meanwhile, Vanessa, Mandy, Kristin, and Jen deal with a rude waiter at lunch and come up with a way to get revenge.
173	21	"How You Like Them Pancakes?"	Victor Gonzalez	Jacob Brown	April 30, 2020	8ATP21	4.25
With Eve coming home on leave, Vanessa is already conceding that her youngest daughter will be spending all her time with Mike. Mike agrees to let Vanessa have a movie night with all three daughters, followed by a special pancake breakfast like the girls used to share when Mike was traveling a lot. However, movie night is cut short when Kristin goes into labor. Elsewhere, Jen's first few days of employment at Outdoor Man Grill become annoying when someone keeps stealing her homemade lunches from the break room refrigerator.

== Production ==
=== Development ===
On April 18, 2019, it was announced that Fox had renewed Last Man Standing for an eighth season. It was later revealed that the series would move from its longtime timeslot on Fridays to make room for WWE SmackDown. The series' was later revealed to be moving to Thursdays starting mid-season following the conclusion of Thursday Night Football. On October 24, 2019, it was announced that the season would premiere on January 2, 2020, with three weeks of back-to-back episodes, before switching to one episode per week starting on January 23. It was also revealed that the season would contain twenty-two episodes and would air at least one new episode each week until the end of the season. On March 15, 2020, it was announced that production had shut down on the season due to the COVID-19 pandemic leaving the planned season finale unfinished. Series regulars Tim Allen and Amanda Fuller each directed one episode of the season.

The season was originally scheduled to have 22 episodes, but one, titled "I Second That Emotion", was unproduced because of the closure of the Fox Studio Lot due to the COVID-19 pandemic. It was later scrapped.

=== Casting ===
On November 12, 2019, it was revealed that Kaitlyn Dever, Susan Sullivan, Tisha Campbell, Bill Engvall, and Jay Leno would all reprise their roles from previous seasons as Eve, Bonnie, Carol, Reverend Paul, and Joe, respectively. On December 21, 2019, it was announced that Terry Bradshaw would guest-star in the season premiere as a fictionalized version of himself. The following day, it was revealed that Dever would be appearing in fewer episodes of the season than she had during the seventh season, due to her busy schedule. Former series regular Jet Jurgensmeyer also guest-starred during the season.

== Viewing figures ==
Viewership and ratings per episode of Last Man Standing season 8
No.	Title	Air date	Rating/share (18–49)	Viewers (millions)	DVR (18–49)	DVR viewers (millions)	Total (18–49)	Total viewers (millions)
1	"No Parental Guidance"	January 2, 2020	1.0/5	5.21	0.6	2.50	1.6	7.71
2	"Wrench in the Works"	January 2, 2020	1.0/5	5.21	0.6	2.50	1.6	7.71
3	"Yours, Wine, and Ours"	January 9, 2020	0.8/4	4.35	0.5	2.37	1.3	6.72
4	"You’ve Got Male (or Female)"	January 9, 2020	0.8/4	4.35	0.5	2.37	1.3	6.72
5	"The Office"	January 16, 2020	0.8/5	4.79	0.5	2.24	1.3	7.03
6	"Mysterious Ways"	January 16, 2020	0.8/5	4.79	0.5	2.24	1.3	7.03
7	"Bedtime Story"	January 23, 2020	0.8/5	4.45	0.5	2.28	1.3	6.74
8	"Romancing the Stone"	January 30, 2020	0.7/4	3.94	0.4	2.18	1.1	6.12
9	"Girls Rock"	February 6, 2020	0.7	3.98	0.5	2.25	1.2	6.24
10	"Break Out the Campaign"	February 13, 2020	0.6	3.66	0.5	2.28	1.1	5.94
11	"Baked Sale"	February 20, 2020	0.7	3.65	0.5	2.28	1.1	5.93
12	"I'm with Cupid"	February 27, 2020	0.7	4.10	0.4	2.21	1.1	6.31
13	"Student Doubt"	March 5, 2020	0.6	3.52	0.4	2.14	1.0	5.66
14	"This Too Shall Bass"	March 12, 2020	0.6	3.67	0.4	2.14	1.0	5.79
15	"Chili Chili Bang Bang"	March 19, 2020	0.9	4.70	0.5	2.12	1.3	6.82
16	"Along Came a Spider"	March 26, 2020	0.8	4.40	0.4	1.92	1.2	6.33
17	"Keep the Change"	April 2, 2020	0.7	4.10	0.4	1.71	1.1	5.85
18	"Garage Band"	April 9, 2020	0.7	4.16	0.4	1.94	1.1	6.10
19	"The Big LeBaxter"	April 16, 2020	0.6	3.86	0.3	1.84	1.0	5.70
20	"Extrasensory Deception"	April 23, 2020	0.7	4.14	0.4	1.88	1.1	6.02
21	"How You Like Them Pancakes?"	April 30, 2020	0.7	4.25	0.4	1.84	1.0	6.09
