= Last Man Standing season 7 =

Season of television series

Last Man Standing
- Season 7
- Promotional poster
- No. of episodes: 22

Release
- Original network: Fox
- Original release: September 28, 2018 – May 10, 2019

Season chronology
- ← Previous; Season 6 (on ABC) Next → Season 8

The seventh season of the television sitcom Last Man Standing premiered on September 28, 2018 on Fox, and concluded on May 10, 2019. It was the first season to air on Fox (whose partner studio of Disney's owned 20th Century Fox Television produces the show), after the series had been cancelled by ABC on May 10, 2017, and picked up by Fox for a seventh season on May 11, 2018. The season consisted of 22 episodes.

== Cast ==
=== Main cast ===
- Tim Allen as Mike Baxter
- Nancy Travis as Vanessa Baxter
- Amanda Fuller as Kristin Beth Baxter
- Molly McCook as Amanda Elaine "Mandy" Baxter-Anderson
- Christoph Sanders as Kyle Anderson
- Jet Jurgensmeyer as Boyd Baxter
- Jordan Masterson as Ryan Vogelson
- Jonathan Adams as Chuck Larabee
- Héctor Elizondo as Edward "Ed" Alzate
- Krista Marie Yu as Jen

=== Recurring ===
- Kaitlyn Dever as Eve Baxter
- Jay Leno as Joe Leonard
- Tisha Campbell as Carol Larabee

=== Guest ===
- Robert Forster as Bud Baxter
- Susan Sullivan as Bonnie
- Bill Engvall as Reverend Paul
- Melissa Peterman as Celia Powers
- François Chau as Henry

== Episodes ==
No. overall	No. in season	Title	Directed by	Written by	Original release date	Prod. code	U.S. viewers (millions)
131	1	"Welcome Baxter"	John Pasquin	Kevin Abbott	September 28, 2018	7ATP01	8.13
Ryan has been in a funk ever since the 2016 election, doing little besides watching cable news and moping around his house. Mike tries to snap him out of it by advising him to focus more on his family than the current political climate, but this backfires when Ryan decides to move his family to Canada. The stress of the situation culminates in Boyd disappearing. Eve is home on leave from the Air Force Academy, but she and Mandy [now played by Molly McCook] also fall out over politics.
132	2	"Man vs. Myth"	John Pasquin	Matt Berry	October 5, 2018	7ATP02	6.15
After his father, Bud, dies, Mike refuses to admit he is sad because his father rarely showed him affection. Things come to a head when Kristin wants to keep some of Bud's things and take over the marijuana store with Ryan, while Mike just wants to get rid of anything that reminds him of his father. Meanwhile, Kyle has a new office job at Outdoor Man, so Mandy tries to help him dress for success.
133	3	"Giving Mike the Business"	John Pasquin	Jon Haller	October 12, 2018	7ATP03	6.32
In an effort to save Outdoor Man from a hostile buyout by a large corporation, Mike proposes to expand and improve the chain. However, Ed is leaning towards selling. Mike convinces Ed not to sell, but Ed then announces his retirement, leading Mike to worry that he may have hurt Ed's feelings and driven him to leave. Ed assures Mike that he simply believes the time is right to retire and leave Mike in charge. Meanwhile, Vanessa learns that Mandy and Kyle are trying to conceive, but soon discovers that, while Kyle is excited, Mandy is unsure she is ready for parenthood. Vanessa convinces her to confess to Kyle but, when Kyle reveals he has a low sperm count, he misreads Mandy's confession as an attempt to cheer him up.
134	4	"Bride of Prankenstein"	Jean Sagal	Claire Mulaney	October 19, 2018	7ATP07	6.28
Mike and Vanessa are both trying to get into the spirit of Halloween by pranking their friends and family. When Mike teams up with Chuck to prank Joe, it backfires. Meanwhile, Kristin, Ryan, Mandy, and Kyle decide to hold a séance in Kyle's mother's trailer, but a misunderstanding causes trouble with the law.
135	5	"One Flew Into the Empty Nest"	Andy Cadiff	Ed Yeager	November 2, 2018	7ATP04	6.11
When Vanessa wants to board a foreign exchange student from Hong Kong, Mike must work overtime to impress her father. Elsewhere, Kristin and Ryan struggle to remain cool when Boyd invites a girl over for the first time.
136	6	"The Courtship of Vanessa's Mother"	Andy Cadiff	Mike Teverbaugh & Linda Teverbaugh	November 9, 2018	7ATP05	6.30
Vanessa, as usual, stresses over her hyper-critical mother, Bonnie (Susan Sullivan), coming to town for a visit, so she steers her toward Ed. However, when Bonnie and Ed hit it off and spend lots of time together, Vanessa begins to regret her decision. Elsewhere, Mandy and Kyle are critical of how Kristin and Ryan are parenting Boyd, but find a night of babysitting him is a learning process for them.
137	7	"Dreams vs. Realty"	Jean Sagal	Jacob Brown	November 16, 2018	7ATP08	5.97
After her clothing designs are rejected by a major marketer, a disappointed Mandy decides to ditch fashion and work toward a real estate license. Mike and Vanessa have differing views on how to handle Mandy's pending career change. Elsewhere, Ed offers to help Kristin and Chuck make a commercial for Outdoor Man Grill.
138	8	"HR's Rough n' Stuff"	Victor Gonzalez	Josh Greenberg	December 7, 2018	7ATP09	5.43
When Mike feels Kyle isn't working out in Personnel, he appoints him to Human Resources. Kyle, however, soon finds himself tested when Joe and Chuck want to file a complaint against Mike. Meanwhile, Boyd talks Ryan and Kristen into dogsitting for a friend of his and Ryan is surprised when the dog hates him.
139	9	"The Gift of the Mike Guy"	Robbie Countryman	Jon Haller	December 14, 2018	7ATP10	5.44
Finding himself lacking original ideas for Ed's Christmas present, Mike comes up with something that will happily keep Ed busy in retirement. Vanessa tries to impress upon her children the importance of the family holiday traditions, as all of them want to blow off the tree trimming for other events. All are glad they hung around when a surprise visitor shows up.
140	10	"Three for the Road"	Dave Cove	Jordan Black	January 4, 2019	7ATP06	5.66
When both Mike and Ryan want to do something with Boyd on the weekend, they compromise and let Boyd choose an activity that all three can attend. Despite Mike and Ryan verbally fighting during the car ride, they eventually teach Boyd that even people with differences can find common ground. Meanwhile, Mandy and Kyle have been listening to a podcast on the still-unsolved Leadville murders from the early 1970s and begin to see clues that the killer may be Ed.
141	11	"Common Ground"	Phill Lewis	Pat Bullard	January 11, 2019	7ATP11	6.16
Mike has to adjust to foreign exchange student Jen being in the house and struggles to bond with her when it appears the two have nothing in common. Meanwhile, Chuck and Kyle have some fun with Ed when they intercept the results of his genealogy study and alter it.
142	12	"Cabin Pressure"	Victor Gonzalez	Mike Teverbaugh & Linda Teverbaugh	February 1, 2019	7ATP12	5.93
With Eve on leave and visiting home, Mike notices that all three of his daughters are on their phones and not talking to each other, so he makes a bet with them that they can't unplug for a full weekend at the family cabin. The girls accept the challenge but, at the cabin, they all struggle to find ways to spend their time. Meanwhile, Jen is at Outdoor Man on a school assignment to shadow an employee there for a day and learn about the retail business. Having no interest in such work, she plans to use the time to study her other subjects, but Kyle staunchly refuses to comply.
143	13	"The Best Man"	Victor Gonzalez	Matt Berry	February 15, 2019	7ATP14	5.98
After Chuck and Carol (Tisha Campbell) make plans to renew their wedding vows, Mike is disappointed when Chuck asks him to be the officiant for the ceremony instead of the best man. Mike becomes even more annoyed when Chuck selects Joe to be the best man, causing Mike and Joe to make plans to upstage each other. At the Baxter home, Jen is surprised at the constant bickering between Kristin and Mandy, as she is an only child and would expect siblings to be nicer to each other. Vanessa then helps Jen see how the bickering is a sign of affection, so Jen tries to join in by taking something from Mandy without asking.
144	14	"Sibling Quibbling"	Victor Gonzalez	Josh Greenberg	February 15, 2019	7ATP15	5.64
While Chuck is on his second honeymoon with Carol, Ed takes over the security operation at Outdoor Man, but Kristin is not happy with the "upgrades" Ed wants to make. Mandy and Kyle agree to combine their finances. However, Mandy gets upset when she finds out that Kyle is giving money to his brother. Mike suggests that Kyle should cut his brother off to make him stand on his own feet like they did with Vanessa's sister April. However, he later finds out that Vanessa is still sending her sister money and just not telling him about it.
145	15	"Arrest Her Development"	Victor Gonzalez	Erin Berry	February 22, 2019	7ATP13	5.37
Vanessa helps Mandy and Kyle with their apartment hunting, but finds fault with every place the two look at and secretly sabotages their efforts. Eventually, Vanessa has to admit she doesn't want her only daughter left in the home to move out. Meanwhile, Ryan runs into regulatory issues while trying to expand the marijuana store into the vacant property upstairs. This causes he and Mike to actually find common ground in their political beliefs.
146	16	"Urban Exploring"	Victor Gonzalez	Jordan Black	March 1, 2019	7ATP16	5.44
When Boyd shows a passion for urban exploration photography, Mike suggests he do some "real" exploring while climbing in the mountains. This doesn't sit well with Kristin, who views it as too dangerous. Meanwhile, Ryan offers Mandy and Kyle a great price on renting the floor above the marijuana shop for an apartment, but insists they complete a list of tasks to fix it up. However, Mandy and Kyle have a hard time focusing on getting the improvements done.
147	17	"Cards on the Table"	Victor Gonzalez	Jacob Brown	March 8, 2019	7ATP17	5.33
Mike reluctantly invites Ryan to his poker game with Ed, Joe, and Chuck and becomes miffed when Ryan gets everyone to open up and talk about their emotions. What Ryan doesn't know is that Mike hears the guys' problems all day at work and poker night is his escape, so the two work out a compromise. Meanwhile, Vanessa, Kyle, and Mandy help Jen ask a popular student to prom.
148	18	"Otherwise Engaged"	Victor Gonzalez	Story by : Tommy Wright; Teleplay by : Brett Isaacson & TJ Martell	March 15, 2019	7ATP19	5.16
Ed shocks Mike and Vanessa with news that he and Bonnie (Vanessa's mother) are now engaged. Mike shares concerns with Ed about his track record (four divorces), which has Ed upset until he learns that Mike is mostly relaying Vanessa's feelings. Meanwhile, Chuck installs video security in Mandy and Kyle's apartment, which later confuses the two when they hear only part of a conversation that Ryan and Kristin are having.
149	19	"The Passion of Paul"	Tim Allen	Pat Bullard	March 22, 2019	7ATP18	5.09
When Reverend Paul asks Mike to fill in as instructor for the adult Sunday school group, Mike hands off the responsibility to Kyle so he can go ice fishing instead. Reverend Paul is so moved by Kyle's interpretation of the Noah's Ark story, it confirms his notion that it is time to retire, and he then encourages Kyle to take his place. Meanwhile, visiting Eve is perturbed when she sees her older sisters treating Jen like their servant.
150	20	"Yass Queen"	Tim Clark	Kevin Hench	April 19, 2019	7ATP20	4.82
With Mandy having trouble landing a distributor for her fashion designs, Mike suggests she sit in on a meeting with one of his over-aggressive outside sales reps, Celia Powers (Melissa Peterman). Despite Celia trying to take over every aspect of Mandy's business, Mandy eventually finds her own way. Elsewhere, Ed tasks Kyle with transcribing his memoirs from old cassette tapes, which he hopes to turn into a book. But as Kyle does the work, he and Chuck find the tapes to be dreadfully dull, not exciting like the stories Ed tells in person.
151	21	"The Favourite"	Jean Sagal	Ed Yeager	May 3, 2019	7ATP21	4.26
Kristin finds a poem on the printer about leaving the house and Mandy assumes it's to her from Vanessa, which irritates Kristin, who got no such thing. It turns out the poem is for Jen, who is returning to Hong Kong soon. The Baxter girls try a grand gesture to win back their mom's favour, only to learn that Jen's mother passed away several years ago. Meanwhile, Ed installs a pinball machine at Outdoor Man, which has Mike recalling his days as "the man to beat" and kids always gunning for him. Sure enough, Chuck, who once challenged for the "pinball crown of Minneapolis", throws down the gauntlet.
152	22	"A Moving Finale"	Victor Gonzalez	Kevin Abbott	May 10, 2019	7ATP22	4.72
When Mandy and Kyle are dragging their feet getting their stuff moved into the new apartment, Vanessa suspects it might be Kyle's fault, as the Baxter home has been his first real family experience. Mike tries to light a fire under the kids and get them moved out, while convincing Kyle that he'll always be considered a son. Meanwhile, Chuck and Ed try (unsuccessfully) to avoid Boyd after Kristin warns them of yet another school fundraiser.

== Production ==
=== Cancellation and renewal ===
On May 11, 2017, it was announced that ABC had officially cancelled Last Man Standing. On May 11, 2018, a year after the announcement of its cancellation, Fox officially picked up the series for a 22-episode seventh season after. Coincidentally, Fox cancelled Brooklyn Nine-Nine at the same time, but it was later picked up by NBC in a situation similar to that of Last Man Standing.

=== Casting ===
Most previous main cast members returned for the seventh season, except that, on July 2, 2018, Molly Ephraim and Flynn Morrison announced that they would exit the series, opting not to return for this season. On August 6, 2018, Molly McCook and Jet Jurgensmeyer joined the series for recasting as Mandy and Boyd Baxter, respectively. Kaitlyn Dever would continue as Eve Baxter, but reduced to recurring status due to other commitments.

== Broadcast ==
The season premiered by fall of 2018–19 television season. It aired Fridays at 8:00 pm as of September 28, 2018.

== Reception ==
=== Critical response ===
On review aggregator Rotten Tomatoes, season 7 holds an approval rating of 58% based on 12 reviews, and an average rating of 5.21/10. The website's critical consensus reads, "Last Man Standing isn't the most realistic sitcom on the dial, but its idealistic representation of opposites living in harmony offers sorely needed hope during divided times." On Metacritic, the season has a weighted average score of 58 out of 100, based on 8 critics, indicating "mixed or average" reviews.

=== Ratings ===
Viewership and ratings per episode of Last Man Standing season 7
No.	Title	Air date	Rating/share (18–49)	Viewers (millions)	DVR (18–49)	DVR viewers (millions)	Total (18–49)	Total viewers (millions)
1	"Welcome Baxter"	September 28, 2018	1.8/10	8.13	0.8	3.29	2.7	11.42
2	"Man vs. Myth"	October 5, 2018	1.3/7	6.15	0.7	2.93	2.1	9.08
3	"Giving Mike the Business"	October 12, 2018	1.4/7	6.32	0.8	3.08	2.2	9.40
4	"Bride of Pranksenstein"	October 19, 2018	1.3/6	6.28	0.8	2.93	2.0	9.22
5	"One Flew Into the Empty Nest"	November 2, 2018	1.2/5	6.11	0.6	2.42	1.8	8.53
6	"The Courtship of Vanessa's Mother"	November 9, 2018	1.3/6	6.30	0.7	2.72	2.0	8.97
7	"Dreams vs. Reality"	November 16, 2018	1.1/4	5.97	0.7	2.68	1.8	8.65
8	"HR’s Rough n’ Stuff"	December 7, 2018	1.1/4	5.43	0.7	2.91	1.7	8.35
9	"The Gift of the Mike Guy"	December 14, 2018	1.0/6	5.44	0.6	2.72	1.6	8.16
10	"Three for the Road"	January 4, 2019	1.0/5	5.66	0.6	2.53	1.6	8.19
11	"Common Ground"	January 11, 2019	1.2/6	6.16	0.7	2.66	1.9	8.82
12	"Cabin Pressure"	February 1, 2019	1.1/6	5.93	0.6	2.52	1.7	8.45
13	"The Best Man"	February 15, 2019	1.1/6	5.98	0.6	2.55	1.7	8.53
14	"Sibling Quibbling"	February 15, 2019	1.0/5	5.64	0.6	2.41	1.6	8.05
15	"Arrest Her Development"	February 22, 2019	1.0/5	5.37	0.5	2.29	1.5	7.66
16	"Urban Exploring"	March 1, 2019	1.0/5	5.44	0.6	2.40	1.6	7.84
17	"Cards on the Table"	March 8, 2019	1.0/5	5.33	0.6	2.65	1.6	8.01
18	"Otherwise Engaged"	March 15, 2019	0.9/5	5.16	0.5	2.27	1.4	7.43
19	"The Passion of Paul"	March 22, 2019	0.9/5	5.09	0.5	2.29	1.4	7.38
20	"Yass Queen"	April 19, 2019	0.9/5	4.82	0.4	2.17	1.3	6.98
21	"The Favourite"	May 3, 2019	0.8/5	4.26	0.5	2.41	1.3	6.66
22	"A Moving Finale"	May 10, 2019	0.9/5	4.72	0.5	2.21	1.4	6.93
