= Last Man Standing season 9 =

TV sitcom season

Last Man Standing
- Season 9
- Promotional poster
- No. of episodes: 21

Release
- Original network: Fox
- Original release: January 3 – May 20, 2021

Season chronology
- ← Previous; Season 8

The ninth and final season of the American sitcom Last Man Standing premiered on January 3, 2021 on Fox, and contained twenty-one episodes. It stars Tim Allen as Mike Baxter, alongside Nancy Travis, Amanda Fuller, Molly McCook, Christoph Sanders, Jordan Masterson, Jonathan Adams, Krista Marie Yu, and Héctor Elizondo. After the season premiere on Sunday, January 3, the show moved to its regular timeslot at 9:30 PM on Thursdays. The series concluded on May 20, 2021 with a one-hour series finale.

== Cast ==
=== Main cast ===
- Tim Allen as Mike Baxter and Tim Taylor
- Nancy Travis as Vanessa Baxter
- Amanda Fuller as Kristin Beth Baxter
- Molly McCook as Amanda Elaine "Mandy" Baxter-Anderson
- Christoph Sanders as Kyle Anderson
- Jordan Masterson as Ryan Vogelson
- Jonathan Adams as Chuck Larabee
- Krista Marie Yu as Jen
- Héctor Elizondo as Edward "Ed" Alzate

=== Recurring ===
- Jay Leno as Joe Leonard

=== Guest ===
- Kaitlyn Dever as Eve Baxter
- François Chau as Henry
- Bill Engvall as Reverend Paul
- Jeff Dunham as himself

== Episodes ==
No. overall	No. in season	Title	Directed by	Written by	Original release date	Prod. code	U.S. viewers (millions)
174	1	"Time Flies"	Victor Gonzalez	Erin Berry	January 3, 2021	9ATP02	2.52
Following a series of time jumps to 2023, Mandy and Kyle are now raising their three-year old daughter, Sarah, while Kristin and Ryan also have a young daughter. After she and Kyle moved into the Baxter home during the COVID-19 pandemic, Mandy is becoming increasingly annoyed with Vanessa's constant parenting advice. Mike is put in the middle when Mandy confides that she and Kyle should move back to their apartment. Meanwhile, Chuck vents to Kristin about Ed switching their usual post-work scotches to a variety of fruity cocktails.
175	2	"Dual Time"	Victor Gonzalez	Jon Haller	January 7, 2021	9ATP01	3.30
As Mike labors over a topic for his 10th anniversary Outdoor Man vlog, Vanessa damages the kitchen disposal. She calls in Tim Taylor who is in town visiting a Binford Tools location and who expressed interest in meeting the man behind the Outdoor Man vlogs. Mike is floored by Tim's uncanny resemblance to himself, as well as his apparent ineptitude at actually making repairs. Meanwhile, Ryan and Kyle make fun of a 1990s female-themed superhero show that Kristin and Mandy are binge-watching, only to learn that their favorite comic book writer actually wrote several episodes for the TV series.
176	3	"High on the Corporate Ladder"	Victor Gonzalez	Mike Teverbaugh & Linda Teverbaugh	January 14, 2021	9ATP04	2.84
With business expanding rapidly at Bud's Buds, Ryan asks Mike for advice on how he and Ed handled growth at Outdoor Man. Worried over giving Ryan the wrong advice, Mike turns the issue over to his businessman friend, Dave. He later learns Dave offered to buy Bud's Buds from Ryan and wants to give Ryan a position in the corporate office. Kristin gets mad at Mike, saying Ryan will be miserable in a job like that. She later confides to Vanessa that she's really afraid Ryan will like the job, and that it will change him. At Outdoor Man, Kyle is given a laptop that used to be Ed's and opens a file with some bucket list items. He and Mandy decide to fulfill Ed's bucket list for him, unaware that Chuck had the laptop before Ed, and the bucket list is actually Chuck's.
177	4	"Jen Again"	Victor Gonzalez	Jenny Yang	January 21, 2021	9ATP05	2.64
Mike and Kyle try to keep the secret from Vanessa that Jen is coming from Hong Kong to live with the Baxters for the next year, but she finds out before Jen arrives. To Vanessa's disappointment, Jen says she is only staying a week. Mike and Vanessa later learn that Jen's father sent her to America because he plans to speak out about the problems in his country, and did not want Jen in harm's way. Jen is further guilt-ridden because she feels like she convinced her father to do what he's doing. Meanwhile, Ryan is invited to a company golf outing, and asks for Chuck's help learning the game so he won't embarrass himself. However, Ryan is embarrassed on the course for another reason.
178	5	"Outdoor Toddler"	Victor Gonzalez	Kevin Hench	January 28, 2021	9ATP03	2.53
Constantly annoyed by her sister Nichole texting her professional photos of her toddler grandson, Vanessa wants a way to one-up her. She proposes that Ed revive the Outdoor Man Toddler catalog, using her granddaughters Evelyn and Sarah as models. However, Ed says his market research shows having only one toddler as the subject is more effective, causing a dilemma when Vanessa has to tell Kristin and Mandy that one of their girls will be left out. Meanwhile, Ryan tells Mike and Chuck that he's thinking about buying a house in their neighborhood that an elderly woman is selling, but has reservations because it needs work. Mike and Chuck secretly put in offers on the house, not telling Ryan or each other. After Ryan finds out, both men pull their offers, with Mike telling the woman her home should go to a nice, growing family. Mike's vlog comment about "not becoming your enemy" inspires Vanessa to do the right thing regarding the toddlers and the catalog.
179	6	"A Fool and His Money"	Victor Gonzalez	Josh Greenberg	February 4, 2021	9ATP06	2.51
Mike and Chuck have the opportunity to acquire a rare 1942 military Jeep, but the restoration will be very pricey. Knowing that Joe has money from his mother's recent death, Mike tries to get him to provide some up-front investment, but the changes Joe wants to make to the Jeep seem ridiculous. Vanessa suggests to Mike that Joe is likely suffering from too much grief to be thinking straight. Elsewhere, Mandy/Kyle and Kristin/Ryan each accuse the other family of teaching their toddlers certain words that they don't like being used.
180	7	"Preschool Confidential"	Victor Gonzalez	Pat Bullard	February 11, 2021	9ATP07	2.25
When Sarah gets into an exclusive preschool and Evelyn doesn't, Kristin asks Vanessa if she can get the principal to reconsider. The principal, Anne, is an old friend from Vanessa's education days, so she thinks it will be a simple matter. However, Anne expects Vanessa to get the city council member she works for to pull a favor in exchange for the preschool admission, leaving Vanessa conflicted. Elsewhere, Mike learns that Kyle can't go on the annual hunting trip with him and Ed because he volunteered to paint the activities room at church that weekend. Mike then confronts Reverend Paul, accusing him of taking advantage of Kyle's strong faith and giving nature.
181	8	"Lost and Found"	Victor Gonzalez	King Hassan	February 18, 2021	9ATP08	2.32
With their restoration business at a standstill because no one can find a suitable car to work on, Ed proposes a challenge to Mike, Chuck and Joe: whoever locates the next classic car to restore gets his face on a billboard promoting their business. Mike and Joe both think they have an angle on a car that an elderly woman wants to sell, and they show up in her driveway at the same time to look at it. The woman comes outside and says a black man was poking around the car earlier, and she called the police on him. Mike, Joe and Ed all know the man was Chuck, and are reminded that some things haven't changed enough with regard to race. Elsewhere, Kyle and Mandy can't help butting in when they learn that Jen has a new romantic interest with whom she's only communicated online. To get back at them, Jen and the guy pull a prank.
182	9	"Grill in the Mist"	Robbie Countryman	Jacob Brown	February 25, 2021	9ATP10	2.52
After much analysis, Mike and Ed have determined that the Outdoor Man Grill is no longer profitable enough to keep open. They worry about breaking the news to Kristin, but soon learn that she has come to the same conclusion. Further, Kristin has reviewed the work history and skills of her staff, and found that most can fill other open positions at Outdoor Man, saving the company recruiting costs. Mike is so impressed, he selects Kristin to be the next CEO of Outdoor Man upon his retirement. Kristin is initially skeptical that Mike will ever retire, but she gets him to agree that he will step down in two years. Elsewhere, Mandy asks Jen to help organize her closet, which ends up taking Mandy and Kyle on a trip down memory lane.
183	10	"Meatless Mike"	Dave Cove	Ed Yeager	March 4, 2021	9ATP12	2.50
At Vanessa's prodding, Mike tries to go a week without meat, but Vanessa catches him cheating with a couple days left. At work, the gang is preparing for a visit by Jeff Dunham, when Ed shares a story with Chuck about his culture believing ventriloquist dummies steal the souls from living beings. This turns out to be a prank when Dunham arrives with his dummy Walter made up to look like Ed. Vanessa learns that Mike passed on brisket from Dunham's favorite restaurant, and wonders why. Mike replies that he doesn't mind doing something Vanessa wants as long as it's his choice. Elsewhere, Kristin is helping Mandy move boxes into the apartment above their new three-car garage when she sees a box that represents Mandy's abandoned fashion career. Kristin, Ryan and Kyle go overboard trying to cheer up Mandy, but she insists she's perfectly happy with the choice she made to be a wife and mother.
184	11	"Granny Nanny"	Robbie Countryman	Claire Mulaney	March 11, 2021	9ATP11	2.42
With Vanessa agonizing over her 55th birthday, she joins a group training for a half-triathlon. However, Mandy and Kristin are running her ragged by constantly dropping off their girls, and Vanessa can't say no. When Vanessa falls asleep and misses her training group, Jen scolds Mandy and Kristin for taking advantage of their mom. While Vanessa is initially upset with Jen for butting in, she later calls her a true Baxter because of how she looks out for others. At work, Mike and Chuck leave Joe out of their car trivia game, making him feel like he's not their friend. Joe later tries to prove it when the guys let him host their next game, adding in questions about himself which Mike and Chuck can't answer. Mike assures Joe there's more to friendship than knowing everything about the other person.
185	12	"Midwife Crisis"	Victor Gonzalez	Kevin Hench	March 18, 2021	9ATP13	2.38
After Mandy expresses frustration with Kristin's daughter being bossy around Sarah, Mike reminds Mandy how her older sister helped her through her pandemic pregnancy. In a flashback, a pregnant Mandy worries about the safety of having her baby in a hospital during the pandemic. Kristin, who had her baby just before the pandemic hit, helps Mandy with an option to use a midwife and give birth at home. While Vanessa is disappointed when Mandy wants Kristin in the birthing room instead of her, Mike helps her see that Kristin stepping up and taking charge is something Vanessa should be proud of. At the same time, Ed buys a high-tech, motorized rocking cradle as a gift for Kyle and Mandy, but Chuck and Ryan struggle to assemble it.
186	13	"Your Move"	Victor Gonzalez	Erin Berry	March 25, 2021	9ATP14	2.42
Kristin gets a trial week to run the Outdoor Man store when Mike takes some time off. While reviewing Chuck's security reports, Kristin sees evidence that he treats black and white shoplifters differently, and she wonders why. At home, Vanessa wants to build a backyard see-saw for her granddaughters, but Kyle keeps pushing for a rocket ship. Mike soon lets Vanessa know why that's so important to Kyle. Meanwhile, Ryan is confounded when Mandy beats him at chess in three straight games, given that he was a junior champion and she's an apparent beginner.
187	14	"The Two Nieces of Eve"	Dave Cove	Jordan Black	April 8, 2021	9ATP09	2.22
Having come home for a few days of leave, Eve spends some time with her two nieces, only to discover they don't enjoy the gross humor that used to make Boyd laugh when he was a toddler. At Mike and Vanessa's prodding, Eve tries again by doing more girly things with Evelyn and Sarah. She comes back home upset, which puzzles her parents after Mandy raves about how much fun the girls had. Mike and Vanessa soon realize Eve is just upset about having to say goodbye to her nieces and return to the base. Meanwhile, Kyle brings up his struggles in his homilytics class after the professor tells him his preaching isn't dynamic enough. Ed suggests that Kyle is perhaps trying too hard, assuring him he is very dynamic just being Kyle.
188	15	"Butterfly Effect"	Amanda Fuller	Jon Haller	April 15, 2021	9ATP15	2.47
When Mike and Vanessa convince Kyle and Mandy to prepare a will and select guardians for Sarah, Kyle is conflicted over whom to choose. Mike's vlog about father figures helps Kyle decide. He chooses Ryan and Kristin as primary guardians, but requests that Ed and Mike also be involved in any major decisions, saying all three men have been important father figures in his life. Ed praises Mike for helping Kyle via the vlog, but Mike says he wrote the vlog about Ed. Meanwhile, Jen is having trouble deciding how to act around fellow employees as she starts a new job at Outdoor Man as an administrative assistant.
189	16	"Parent-normal Activity"	Jordan Masterson	Story by : Tommy Wright; Teleplay by : Brett Isaacson & TJ Martell	April 22, 2021	9ATP16	2.63
After Vanessa angers Mandy by putting Sarah in a "time out" while babysitting, Mandy later has to admit she feels like she's failing as a parent with Sarah becoming increasingly less willing to do what she's told. Meanwhile, Joe encourages Mike to get Ed something more personal on their anniversary of becoming partners, rather than just another bottle of scotch. After struggling with ideas, Mike decides to frame the check he once offered Ed to buy into the business. Ed then explains to Chuck, Joe and Kyle that he refused Mike's money back then and tore up the check, saying he only wanted Mike's smarts and work ethic.
190	17	"Love & Negotiation"	Christoph Sanders	Mike Teverbaugh & Linda Teverbaugh	April 29, 2021	9ATP17	2.11
When Ryan's company offers a CBD-based topical pain relieving cream as an exclusive to Outdoor Man, Mike puts Kristin in charge of the negotiations. Kristin demands a three percent lower price, and Ryan quickly agrees. Kristin later learns that another outdoor chain was in negotiations with Ryan, and thinks that Ryan only agreed to her deal because they're married. However, Ryan later tells her that his company really wanted to do business with Outdoor Man, even at a slightly lower profit margin, and praises her in front of Mike for her shrewd negotiations. Meanwhile, Mandy challenges Vanessa to a contest to see who can rack up the most steps on their fitness watches. When the ultra-competitive Vanessa becomes obsessed with her step count, it upsets Jen, who later says she really enjoys her time just strolling and talking with Vanessa.
191	18	"Yoga and Boo-Boo"	Leslie Kolins Small	Pat Bullard	May 6, 2021	9ATP18	2.14
When Mike's doctor recommends more stretching exercises, Vanessa tries to get him to embrace yoga, going so far as to tell him Chuck is also taking her class. Mike's skepticism is further heightened when Chuck injures his back working on a truck engine. Meanwhile, after conversations during game night, Ryan and Kristin become convinced that Kyle and Mandy are jealous of their business success. In reality, Kyle and Mandy are certain that Ryan and Kristin are jealous of all the time they have to spend with each other.
192	19	"Murder, She Wanted"	Victor Gonzalez	Josh Greenberg & Jordan Black	May 13, 2021	9ATP19	2.35
After Mike and Ryan become closer on a trip to a marketing conference, Ryan invites himself to view the finale of a reality murder mystery Mike has been watching with Mandy. Mandy becomes upset, and Vanessa helps Mike get to the bottom of it. Meanwhile, Ed urges Chuck and Joe to see Taft: The Musical, even going so far as to buy their tickets. After Chuck and Joe skip watching it and upset Ed, they eventually do go see it and soon learn Ed's motives.
193	20	"Baxter Boot Camp"	Kit Wilkinson	Ed Yeager	May 20, 2021	9ATP20	2.63
When Jen announces that she and some visiting friends from Hong Kong want to go camping on Torreys Peak, Vanessa suggests they try something more suited for beginners, like a public campsite. Jen won't accept this, so Vanessa and Mandy prepare her for the wilderness by putting her through the Baxter Boot Camp in the back yard. At Outdoor Man, Kristin is spending long hours on her latest projects, prompting Mike to try and explain to her the importance of work-life balance. Kristin replies that she loves the work, and Mike agrees that it's even tougher to leave a job you love to make time for family. Meanwhile, Kyle asks Ed to approve his request to have his hours reduced to part-time, so he can also work at the church. Ed says he'll sign the form only if Kyle can explain to him how he can get into heaven. Knowing Ed is not particularly religious makes this a tough task. Kyle returns and tells Ed he can't give him a simple explanation, but offers to sit down with Ed anytime and have a conversation about it. Ed agrees and signs the form.
194	21	"Keep on Truckin'"	Andy Cadiff	Tim Allen	May 20, 2021	9ATP21	2.63
Mike finally receives the last item to make his 1956 Ford F100 restoration complete (the original bill of sale that Joe mischievously purchased ahead of Mike so he could use it as a bonding moment), but overnight, the truck is stolen. Everyone pitches in to locate the truck and thieves. Chuck later comes to the Baxter house with bad news: a camera caught the truck being driven into a suspected chop shop, but when police arrived, it was gone. Mike holds a memorial for the truck, with everyone sharing their memories. Even Eve shares via Skype call from her base. Mike later tells Vanessa it was one of the best nights of his life, because it brought his family and closest friends together. In his final vlog of the series, Mike uses the truck as a metaphor for family memories, as photos of the main characters scroll on the screen's sidebar.

== Production ==
=== Development ===
On May 19, 2020, Fox renewed Last Man Standing for a ninth season. On October 14, 2020, it was announced that the season would be the final one of the series. The season takes place in 2023 in order to not occur during the COVID-19 pandemic, although it will still address how the pandemic impacted the characters. The time jump also allows the babies that the Kristin and Mandy characters were pregnant with at the close of season 8 to be presented as three-year old toddlers. The premiere was originally planned to be the unfinished finale from the eighth season, however due to the fact that most of it would have to be rewritten, and that planned guest-star Kaitlyn Dever was unavailable, the producers instead decided to write a new episode.

=== Casting ===
On December 4, 2020, it was announced that series star Tim Allen would also reprise his role from Home Improvement as Tim "The Tool Man" Taylor for the second episode of the season, "Dual Time". Even though the producers had some difficulty getting permission to use the character of Tim Taylor, they ultimately were able to obtain it. On December 25, 2020, it was announced that Sophia McKinlay would portray Sarah. Krista Marie Yu is set to reprise her role as Jen starting with the fourth episode of the season, "Jen Again". Kaitlyn Dever reprised her role as Eve Baxter in the season premiere, "Time Flies".

== Release ==
On November 10, 2020, it was announced that the season would have a special premiere on January 3, 2021, before moving to its regular timeslot on January 7, 2021. On December 22, 2020, it was announced that the season would premiere an hour later than originally planned on January 3, 2021, to make room for the series premiere of The Great North.

== Ratings ==
Viewership and ratings per episode of Last Man Standing season 9
No.	Title	Air date	Rating (18–49)	Viewers (millions)	DVR (18–49)	DVR viewers (millions)	Total (18–49)	Total viewers (millions)
1	"Time Flies"	January 3, 2021	0.5	2.52	TBD	TBD	TBD	TBD
2	"Dual Time"	January 7, 2021	0.5	3.30	TBD	TBD	TBD	TBD
3	"High on the Corporate Ladder"	January 14, 2021	0.5	2.84	TBD	TBD	TBD	TBD
4	"Jen Again"	January 21, 2021	0.4	2.64	TBD	TBD	TBD	TBD
5	"Outdoor Toddler"	January 28, 2021	0.4	2.56	TBD	TBD	TBD	TBD
6	"A Fool and His Money"	February 4, 2021	0.4	2.52	TBD	TBD	TBD	TBD
7	"Preschool Confidential"	February 11, 2021	0.4	2.25	TBD	TBD	TBD	TBD
8	"Lost and Found"	February 18, 2021	0.4	2.32	TBD	TBD	TBD	TBD
9	"Grill in the Mist"	February 25, 2021	0.5	2.52	TBD	TBD	TBD	TBD
10	"Meatless Mike"	March 4, 2021	0.5	2.50	TBD	TBD	TBD	TBD
11	"Granny Nanny"	March 11, 2021	0.4	2.42	TBD	TBD	TBD	TBD
12	"Midwife Crisis"	March 18, 2021	0.5	2.38	TBD	TBD	TBD	TBD
13	"Your Move"	March 25, 2021	0.4	2.42	TBD	TBD	TBD	TBD
14	"The Two Nieces of Eve"	April 8, 2021	0.4	2.22	TBD	TBD	TBD	TBD
15	"Butterfly Effect"	April 15, 2021	0.4	2.47	TBD	TBD	TBD	TBD
16	"Parent-normal Activity"	April 22, 2021	0.5	2.63	TBD	TBD	TBD	TBD
17	"Love & Negotiation"	April 29, 2021	0.3	2.11	TBD	TBD	TBD	TBD
18	"Yoga and Boo-Boo"	May 6, 2021	0.3	2.14	0.3	1.75	0.7	3.89
19	"Murder, She Wanted"	May 13, 2021	0.4	2.35	0.3	1.70	0.6	4.05
20	"Baxter Boot Camp"	May 20, 2021	0.4	2.63	0.3	1.75	0.7	4.39
21	"Keep on Truckin'"	May 20, 2021	TBD	TBD	TBD	TBD	TBD	TBD
