= Hardass =

Hardass, Hard Ass, or Hard-Ass may refer to:

- Hardas or Hardass, a village in Kargil district, Ladakh, India
- Hard Ass, a book-length poem by Sharon McCartney that was nominated for a ReLit Award
- "Hard Ass", a 2001 episode of Titus
- "Hard Ass", a 1995 song by Money Mark from Mark's Keyboard Repair
- Hard-Ass, a character in Last Man Standing
- Officer Hardass, a character in Drugwars

== See also ==
- Buttocks
- Hard Ass Candy, an art collection by Olinda Castielle
- Hard Ass Sessions, a series of compilation albums from Enchufada
