= The Legend of 5 Mile Cave =

2019 American film

- Directed by: Brent Christy
- Written by: William Shockley
- Starring: Adam Baldwin; Jeremy Sumpter; Jill Wagner; Jet Jurgensmeyer
- Production company: INSP
- Release date: June 9, 2019 (United States)
- Running time: 90 minutes
- Country: United States
- Language: English

The Legend of 5 Mile Cave is an American Western film, starring Jill Wagner, Adam Baldwin and Jet Jurgensmeyer. It premiered on June 9, 2019, and was produced by INSP.

Following its airing on US cable television, the film became available on a number of streaming platforms.

== Plot ==
The film stars Jill Wagner, who plays the role of Susan, a widowed mother attempting to save the family farm from foreclosure. It is set in the 1920s in Kentucky. The film starts when a peculiar man arrives at the farm wanting to rent a room. The mysterious man is played by Adam Baldwin, and over time, he begins to bond with Susan's son, played by Jet Jurgensmeyer. He recounts the stories from the 1800s of the legendary gunslinger, Shooter Green, played by Jeremy Sumpter. It is shot over two timelines, past and present before the two timelines collide. The man's secrets could help save the farm.

== Main cast ==
- Adam Baldwin as Sam Barnes
- Jeremy Sumpter as Young 'Shooter' Green
- Jill Wagner as Susan Tilwicky
- Jet Jurgensmeyer as Tommy Tilwicky
- Allie DeBerry as Josie Hayes
- Randy Wayne as Young John 'Doc' Small
- William Shockley as Sheriff John 'Doc' Small
- Tom Proctor as Virgil Earp
- Danny Vinson as Sheriff Bean
- Rob Moran as William Davis
- Mark Jeffrey Miller as Wade Kinsley
- Roxzane T. Mims as Sally
- Stefanie Butler as Martha Lowry

== Reception ==
As of 2022, The Legend of 5 Mile Cave has a rating of 4.4/5 on Amazon Prime. Once Upon a Time in a Western gave the film 4 out of 5, stating it was "a well-done, well-acted family Western that's longer on story than action and still manages to be quite entertaining." Cowboys & Indians magazine referred to the film as an "old-fashioned, family-friendly western." The Dove Foundation and also La Vanguardia, and others, gave the film a positive review.
