= Laurette Spang-McCook =

American actress (born 1951)

- Born: Laurette Spang; May 16, 1951 (age 75); Buffalo, New York, U.S.
- Education: American Academy of Dramatic Arts
- Occupation: Actress
- Years active: 1972–2007
- Known for: Battlestar Galactica; Airport 1975
- Spouse: John McCook (m. 1980)
- Children: 3, including Molly McCook

Laurette Spang-McCook (born 1951), credited as Laurette Spang, is an American television actress. She is best known for playing the character Cassiopeia on the original Battlestar Galactica (1978).

== Early life/family ==
Spang was born on May 16, 1951 in Buffalo, New York, and raised in Ann Arbor, Michigan. Speech courses during her high school years sparked her interest in acting.

The summer of her junior year, Spang worked with the Williamstown Summer Theater. A year later, Scott set up an audition for Spang at the American Academy of Dramatic Arts. She received a scholarship and graduated from there two years later. Following graduation in 1969, Spang returned to Michigan where she attended Adrian College, living dorm life on a small campus, but not far from her family in Ann Arbor. She dropped out of Adrian before completing her first year after her poor grades led her father to stop providing money. For two years, Spang was a typist in a real estate office, earning money to support herself and study acting.

== Career ==
After a Universal Studios talent agent spotted her in 1972, Spang signed a 7-year contract with the studio. She then had a succession of guest-starring roles in television series including Emergency!, Adam-12, The Streets of San Francisco, The Six Million Dollar Man, Happy Days, Chase, The Secrets of Isis, Charlie's Angels and Lou Grant. Spang also appeared in the television movies Short Walk to Daylight, Runaway! and Sarah T. - Portrait of a Teenage Alcoholic. She co-starred in a production of Winesburg, Ohio on KCET's Hollywood Television Theatre.

Towards the end of her contract with Universal (by which time, according to People Weekly Magazine, October 2, 1978, her money was almost exhausted and she had been evicted from an apartment she had been renting), Spang was cast as Cassiopeia in the Battlestar Galactica pilot movie, "Saga of a Star World". An initial draft of the script had her killed off in the pilot film, in which the insectoid Ovions consumed her, almost cannibal-style. However, the character survived and the network kept her on in a regular role in the subsequent weekly series, but "Standards and Practices" (network censors) forced a change of profession upon her. (The censors would no longer allow her to be a so-called "socialator" (similar to a geisha), so Glen Larson and Donald P. Bellisario had her character become a medtech (a nurse) in the series, beginning with "Lost Planet of the Gods, Parts 1 & 2").

Spang's later acting performances were in The Love Boat, Fantasy Island, The Dukes of Hazzard, BJ and the Bear, Magnum, P.I., Three's Company, Man from Atlantis, The Gemini Man and more. She took a de facto retirement from acting in 1984, though she made a brief appearance in the 2007 horror film Plot 7, which also featured her husband John McCook. Spang appeared in the Battlestar Galactica episode of Sciography documentary series on the Sci-Fi Channel in 2002. In 2003, she appeared in another Battlestar Galactica documentary included as an extra feature in the DVD box set of the series released for the series' 25th anniversary.

== Personal life ==
Spang married actor John McCook on February 16, 1980; the couple have three children, including actress Molly McCook.

== Filmography ==
Film and Television
Year	Title	Role	Notes
1972	The Bold Ones: The New Doctors	Real Estate Lady	Episode: "Is This Operation Necessary?"
1972	Short Walk to Daylight	Sandy	ABC Movie of the Week
1972	Emergency!	Betsy Power	Episode: "Dinner Date"
1973	Alias Smith and Jones	Emma Sterling	Episode: "Only Three to a Bed"
1973	Winesburg, Ohio	Helen White	Television film
1973	Marcus Welby, M.D.		Episode: "The Panic Path"
1973	Chase	Jill Bronston	Episode: "Foul-Up"
1973	Runaway!	Coed	Television film
1973	Emergency!	Sally	Episode: "The Old Engine"
1973	Adam-12	Carla Rogers	Episode: "Venice Division"
1973	The Streets of San Francisco	Kim	Episode: "Harem"
1973	Maneater	Polly	ABC Movie of the Week
1973	Owen Marshall: Counselor at Law	Sherry	Episode: "A Girl Named Tham"
1974	Happy Days	Arlene Holder	Episode: "Breaking Up Is Hard to Do"
1974	The Six Million Dollar Man	Yeoman Helen Maychick	Episode: "Survival of the Fittest"
1974	Airport 1975	Arlene	Feature film
1974	The Rangers	Julie Beck	Television film
1975	Emergency!	Mrs. Long	Episode: "Kidding"
1975	Sarah T. – Portrait of a Teenage Alcoholic	Nancy	Television film
1975	Sunshine	Cathy	Episode: "Jill"
1975	Happy Days	Denise Hudson	Episode: "Kiss Me Sickly"
1976	The Love Boat	Juanita Havlicek	Television film
1976	The Secrets of Isis	Ann	Episode: "The Cheerleader"
1976	Gemini Man	Maggie	Episode: "Run, Sam, Run"
1976	Charlie's Angels	Tracy Martel	Episode: "Consenting Adults"
1977	McNamara's Band	Helga Zimhoff	TV pilot episode
1977	Happy Days	Arlene	Episode: "The Graduation" (Part 1)
1977	Happy Days	Wendy	3-part episodes: "Hollywood"
1978	Lou Grant	Joanie Hume	Episodes: "Airliner" / "Spies"
1978	The Love Boat	Melanie Taylor	Episode: "A Very Special Girl"
1978	Man from Atlantis	Amanda Trevanian	Episode: "The Siren"
1978	Colorado C.I.	Chris Morrison	TV pilot episode
1978	Project U.F.O.	Linda Collins	Episode: "Sighting 4015: The Underwater Incident"
1978–79	Battlestar Galactica	Cassiopeia	21 episodes, 3 of these episodes were also edited and released as a feature film in 1978
1979	B. J. and the Bear	Snow White	2-part episodes: "Snow White and the Seven Lady Truckers"
1980	Barnaby Jones	Lucy	Episode: "The Final Victim"
1980	Tourist	RoseAnne Wicker	TV film
1980	Three's Company	Inga	Episode: "Downhill Chaser"
1981	B. J. and the Bear	Snow White	Episode: "B.J. and the Seven Lady Truckers: Part 2"
1981	The Love Boat	Linda	Episode: "Split Personality"
1981	Aloha Paradise		Episode: "Blue Honeymoon"
1981	Fantasy Island	Karen Saunders-Holmes	Episode: "The Searcher"
1981	The Dukes of Hazzard	Mindy Lou Hale	Episode: "The Fugitive"
1982	The Day the Bubble Burst	Frances Pierce	Television film
1984	Magnum, P.I.	Marge Atherton / Zelda Fitzgerald	Episode: "The Case of the Red-Faced Thespian"
2003	Galacticon	Herself	Documentary
2007	Plot 7	Lady in White	
