= Reboot (2022 TV series) =

2022 American comedy series

- Genre: Comedy
- Created by: Steven Levitan
- Starring: Keegan-Michael Key; Johnny Knoxville; Rachel Bloom; Calum Worthy; Krista Marie Yu; Judy Greer; Paul Reiser
- Country of origin: United States
- Original language: English
- No. of seasons: 1
- No. of episodes: 8

Production
- Executive producers: Steven Levitan; John Enbom; Danielle Stokdyk; Jeff Morton
- Producer: Keegan-Michael Key
- Camera setup: Single camera
- Running time: 23–31 minutes
- Production companies: Levitan Productions; 20th Television

Original release
- Network: Hulu
- Release: September 20 – October 25, 2022

Reboot is an American comedy television series created by Steven Levitan. It stars Keegan-Michael Key, Johnny Knoxville, Judy Greer, and Rachel Bloom. The series follows the dysfunctional cast of a fictional early 2000s hit sitcom, Step Right Up, who must face their unresolved issues and navigate a vastly different media and entertainment environment when a young writer successfully pitches a reboot of their show. The series premiered on Hulu on September 20, 2022. Reboot received generally positive reviews from critics. In January 2023, Hulu opted to cancel the show after one season.

== Cast ==
=== Main ===
- Keegan-Michael Key as Reed Sterling, the Yale-trained actor who played "Lawrence", the stepfather on Step Right Up, before leaving the show to pursue a failed career in theater and film.
- Johnny Knoxville as Clay Barber, the actor and raunchy stand-up comedian who played "Jake", the ex-husband in Step Right Up and is now dealing with a lifetime of alcoholism, drug abuse, and repeated arrests for minor crimes.
- Rachel Bloom as Hannah Korman, an up-and-coming indie film screenwriter who lands a deal with Hulu to revive Step Right Up but is forced into the role of co-showrunner with the sitcom's creator, Gordon, who is her estranged father.
- Calum Worthy as Zack Jackson, the former child actor who played "Cody", the son on Step Right Up, before going on to a brief career as the leading man in a series of low-budget teen movies.
- Krista Marie Yu as Elaine Kim, the inexperienced studio executive tasked with overseeing the revival of Step Right Up and Zack's love interest.
- Judy Greer as Bree Marie Jensen, the actress who played "Josie", the mother on Step Right Up, then retired from acting when she married the duke of a small Nordic country before losing all of her money in their divorce.
- Paul Reiser as Gordon Gelman, the writer who originally created Step Right Up and maintains the rights to the show, allowing him to co-opt Hannah as lead showrunner.

=== Recurring ===
- Eliza Coupe as Nora, Reed's girlfriend and a successful playwright
- Alyah Chanelle Scott as Timberly Fox, a former reality show contestant who plays "Whitney", the adult daughter of Reed's character Lawrence.
- Lawrence Pressman as Jerry, the former director of episodes from the original Step Right Up who returns to direct episodes in the reboot
- Ryan Dietz as Dennis, the first AD of "Step Right Up"
- Fred Melamed, Rose Abdoo and George Wyner as Alan, Selma and Bob, older and experienced comedy writers brought in by Gordon
- Kimia Behpoornia, Korama Danquah and Dan Leahy as Azmina, Janae and Benny, young and socially conscious comedy writers brought in by Hannah

=== Guest ===
- Kerri Kenney as Susan, Zack's mother
- Robert Clendenin as Dougie, a struggling actor and old friend of Clay's
- Esther Povitsky as Marcy, Zack's ex-girlfriend
- Stephanie Allynne as Mallory, a Hulu HR representative
- Peter Gallagher as Tyler, the new president of Hulu

== Episodes ==
No.	Title	Directed by	Written by	Original release date	Prod. code
1	"Step Right Up"	Steven Levitan	Story by : Steven Levitan; Teleplay by : Steven Levitan and John Enbom	September 20, 2022	1QSE79
After meeting with executives at Hulu, Hannah gets the green-light to revive the sitcom Step Right Up with the aim of making it more "adult" by having the original cast play older versions of their characters. When production starts, the cast, including Reed Sterling, Clay Barber, Zack Jackson, and Bree Marie Jensen, return and see each other for the first time since the original show ended. Reed is now a struggling film actor who hasn't starred in a major role for decades, Clay is a recovering alcoholic with a lengthy arrest history, Zack is a C-lister who still lives with his mother, and Bree is a bankrupt divorcée who takes the role only because she needs money. Against Hannah's wishes, the studio brings in Gordon to act as co-showrunner, resulting in her quitting the production. Gordon's stubborn refusal to update the show as Hannah originally intended leads the cast to secretly visit her at home, successfully begging her to return and stop him from ruining their chance at a comeback. Reed suddenly has an epiphany when he recalls how Hannah had given his character a "dark secret" and realizes that she doesn't want to work with Gordon because he is her estranged biological father.
2	"New Girl"	Carrie Brownstein	David Feeney	September 20, 2022	1QSE02
Gordon and Hannah's professional relationship continues to sour between Hannah's unresolved anger towards her father for abandoning her and Gordon defiantly refusing to take responsibility. Former reality show contestant Timberly is cast as Lawrence's adult daughter Whitney; her acting abilities begin to improve when Reed offers to coach her, but an envious Bree manages to sabotage her rehearsal performance with awful acting tips. When Zach's mother Susan visits him on set, Clay finds it inappropriate and decides to help his co-star by asking her to stop. Susan, picking up on Clay's emotionally scarred psyche, manipulates him into having sex with her instead. Bree comes clean to Timberly after Reed points out that she's doing the same horrible things to her younger costar that had been done to her earlier in her career. This results in a powerful episode of Step Right Up where Lawrence confesses to Whitney how much he regrets not being in her life. Hannah realizes that this is Gordon's way of apologizing for being an absent father.
3	"Growing Pains"	Jaffar Mahmoud	John Quaintance	September 20, 2022	1QSE03
An uncomfortable Clay attempts to break things off with Susan by having an actor friend impersonate an HR representative and lie about how such an "improper relationship" would force the studio to fire him; Susan sees through the ruse but understands and tells Clay that she is always around if he needs a hook-up. Zack is clearly upset until Clay recognizes that all he wanted was a father figure in his life and decides to start spending more time with him outside of work. Bree gets emotional when the wardrobe department fits her with Spanx so she looks younger on camera. Wanting to help, Timberly offers to take her out for drinks. Hannah and Gordon clash again when they both hire their own writers, who prove unable to agree on anything and wind up wasting an entire day of work. Hannah is about to give up when she accidentally improvises a joke that everyone finds funny, convincing both sides that they can in fact work together. Reed calls Bree to try and deal with his long-repressed feelings for her, unaware that she and Timberly just finished having drunken sex.
4	"Girlfriends"	Chris Koch	Josh Levine	September 27, 2022	1QSE04
Bree and Timberly deal with the aftermath of their drunken sex, and Bree expresses her sexuality. Hannah decides to come out to her father, who is accepting of her. Reed and Clay convince Bree that Timberly slept with her to weaken her career based on her history on reality television, however this is proven false. Zack takes Elaine on a tour of the lot.
5	"What We Do in the Shadows"	Jaffar Mahmoud	Caroline Fox & Josh Levine	October 4, 2022	1QSE05
Reed admits to Hannah that he's frustrated Gordon doesn't take his tips. Gordon tells her not to get involved in the actors' lives; to prove him wrong, Hannah sets Reed and Gordon up to have dinner with each other and agrees to help Zack get back custody of his dog from his ex-girlfriend. Reed and Gordon enjoy their dinner and admit their admiration for each other. Bree joins a women's group that seems like a Ponzi scheme only to get lost in the woods on a wellness retreat. She calls Clay, who is on the way to an AA meeting to celebrate thirty days sober, and the two connect over their newfound experiences.
6	"Bewitched"	Beth McCarthy-Miller	Andrew Gurland	October 11, 2022	1QSE06
Zack asks Hannah to help him find out if it's okay to ask out a coworker. When she does, the writer's room uses it as an opportunity to set her up with Mallory, a human resources employee. To the dismay of his girlfriend Nora, Reed ends up staying in the same hotel as Bree and they reconnect with a game they played in the past. They make plans to go to dinner, but Bree backs out after overhearing a phone call between Reed and Nora. Clay starts to make amends for past actions which results in him upsetting the director, Jerry, before eventually giving a sincere apology.
7	"Baskets"	Viet Nguyen	Dave King	October 18, 2022	1QSE07
Hannah supervises a looping session with Clay before realising how terrible he is at reading lines. Bree joins the writers room where she pitches bizarre, Josie-centric ideas. Hannah swaps places with Gordon; Gordon tries a harsh approach with Clay before Clay admits he used to drink through ADR. He is able to nail the line after Gordon gives him a hug. Bree admits to Selma that she is trying to catch up with her career; Selma encourages her but tells her to stop being so vain. Eventually, she is able to pitch a good story idea. Reed agrees to play basketball with Zack and is surprised to find out he is playing against kids. Reed accidentally injures a kid, and the incident is recorded by two teenage girls observing the game. Zack agrees to take them to prom in exchange for the video's deletion.
8	"Who's the Boss?"	Chris Koch	Steven Levitan	October 25, 2022	1QSE08
During an interview, Bree is blindsided with the news that her ex-husband is marrying and having a baby with his former assistant. She impulsively announces that she and Reed are back together, blindsiding Reed, whose suspicious girlfriend Nora has surprised him with a visit. Gordon and Hannah are notified that there has been a change in leadership at Hulu, and the new network president Tyler Griffin has a personal grudge against Gordon. During a meeting that could impact the show's future, Gordon insults Tyler, putting the fate of the show further in jeopardy. Zack initially encourages Clay to finalize his purchase of a house but tries to discourage him without revealing that Elaine has informed him of the potential cancellation. Reed corroborates Bree's news, but proposes to Nora, who says yes. Bree calls him and admits she still has feelings for him. Gordon quits the show rather than apologize to Tyler or accept cancellation, hurting Hannah. Bree visits Clay at his new home.

== Production ==
=== Development ===
On August 5, 2021, the series was given a pilot order by Hulu, and on January 11, 2022, was given a series order. On January 30, 2023, Hulu canceled the series after one season, with the series being planned to be shopped to other networks. On February 8, it was reported the series had failed to be picked up elsewhere and officially ended production.

=== Casting ===
Alongside the series announcement, it was confirmed that Keegan-Michael Key and Johnny Knoxville would star in the series. On September 22, 2021, it was announced that Leslie Bibb would join the series as Bree, alongside Rachel Bloom as Hannah, Michael McKean as Gordon, Krista Marie Yu as Elaine, and Calum Worthy as Zack. On January 11, 2022, it was announced that Judy Greer had replaced Bibb as Bree Marie Jensen. In February 2022, it was reported that Paul Reiser would play the role of Gordon in the series, replacing McKean.

== Release ==
Reboot premiered on Hulu in the United States on September 20, 2022. Internationally, the series was released on Disney+ under the dedicated streaming hub Star.

== Reception ==
=== Viewership ===
The streaming aggregator Reelgood, which monitors real-time data from 5 million users in the U.S. for original and acquired content across SVOD and AVOD services, reported that Reboot was the 9th most streamed program across all platforms during the week of September 22–28. JustWatch, a guide to streaming content with access to data from more than 20 million users around the world, calculated that it was the fourth most-streamed series in the U.S. during the week of September 25. Whip Media, which tracks viewership data for the more than 21 million worldwide users of its TV Time app, announced that Reboot ranked among the ten most-streamed original series in the U.S. from October 9–30.

According to market research company Parrot Analytics, which tracks consumer engagement across streaming, downloads, and social media, Reboot had 3.9 times the audience demand of the average show in the United States over the 30 days leading up to January 2024. This level of demand is achieved by only 8.6% of all TV shows, indicating strong performance. Demand for the show increased significantly in January 2024, with a 15.7% growth in audience interest during the month. In the comedy genre in the United States, Reboot ranked in the 89.3 percentile, outperforming 89.3% of all other comedy titles in the country. In terms of global markets, Reboot performed well in the United States and Canada, with demand exceeding the average TV show (1x) in each of these markets. Other markets exhibited solid to moderate demand, consistently surpassing the average performance of other titles.

=== Critical response ===
The review aggregator website Rotten Tomatoes reported an 85% approval rating with an average rating of 6.9/10, based on 33 critic reviews. The website's critics consensus reads, "Reboot hardly reinvents the Hollywood satire with its meta jokes that could have used more bite, but its more conventional qualities—namely a delightful cast—make for a mirthful enough watch." Metacritic, which uses a weighted average, assigned a score of 70 out of 100 based on 22 critics, indicating "generally favorable reviews".

Judy Berman of Time said that Reboot channels nostalgia for family sitcoms while exposing their outdated optimism. She praised the show's writing and cast, highlighting its ability to balance humor with a critique of the sitcom industry's recycling trend. Berman found that the series insightfully contrasts millennial perspectives with the older generation's desire for comforting, familiar narratives. She appreciated how it explores the clash between modern social consciousness and traditional sitcom formulas. Berman stated that while Reboot does not aim to resolve generational divides, it successfully blends old and new comedic sensibilities. Saloni Gajjar The A.V. Club stated that Reboot offers a meta-humor-filled critique of Hollywood's reboot culture, praised for its biting commentary on corporate mergers, diversity, and '80s/'90s sitcom nostalgia. She found the ensemble cast, especially Greer, Reiser, and Bloom, to be a highlight, delivering both comedic and emotional depth. Gajjar stated that while the show excels in satire, it falters as it alternates between edgy and sentimental moments, but she appreciated its commentary on Hollywood and its dynamic performances, calling it "Must-See TV."

Lorraine Ali of Los Angeles Times praised Reboot as a sharp, self-deprecating comedy that turns the challenges of remaking a sitcom into comedic gold. She highlighted the show's clever satire of the reboot-obsessed TV industry, particularly its focus on the generational clash between outdated boomer humor and millennial sensibilities. Ali pointed out how the dynamic between Hannah and her father, Gordon adds both comedic and emotional depth. She also emphasized the strong chemistry among the cast, saying it elevates the show from merely good to exceptionally funny. Thelma Adams of TheWrap complimented Reboot for its humor and insightful satire, particularly in addressing generational clashes, workplace dysfunction, and Hollywood's evolving comedy landscape. She found the show consistently hilarious, highlighting Bloom's relatable performance as the anxious first-time showrunner, while also commending the chemistry between the cast, including Key, Greer, and Knoxville. Adams appreciated the series' ability to deftly navigate the tensions between old and new comedy styles, with standout moments that reflect the changing dynamics in the writer's room, and she eagerly anticipated a second season.

=== Accolades ===
Award	Year	Category	Nominee(s)	Result	Ref.
Critics' Choice Awards	2023	Best Comedy Series	Reboot	Nominated	
Critics' Choice Awards	2023	Best Actor in a Comedy Series	Keegan-Michael Key	Nominated	
Astra TV Awards	2024	Best Actor in a Streaming Comedy Series	Keegan-Michael Key	Nominated	
Astra TV Awards	2024	Best Supporting Actress in a Streaming Comedy Series	Rachel Bloom	Nominated	
