= John McCook =

American actor

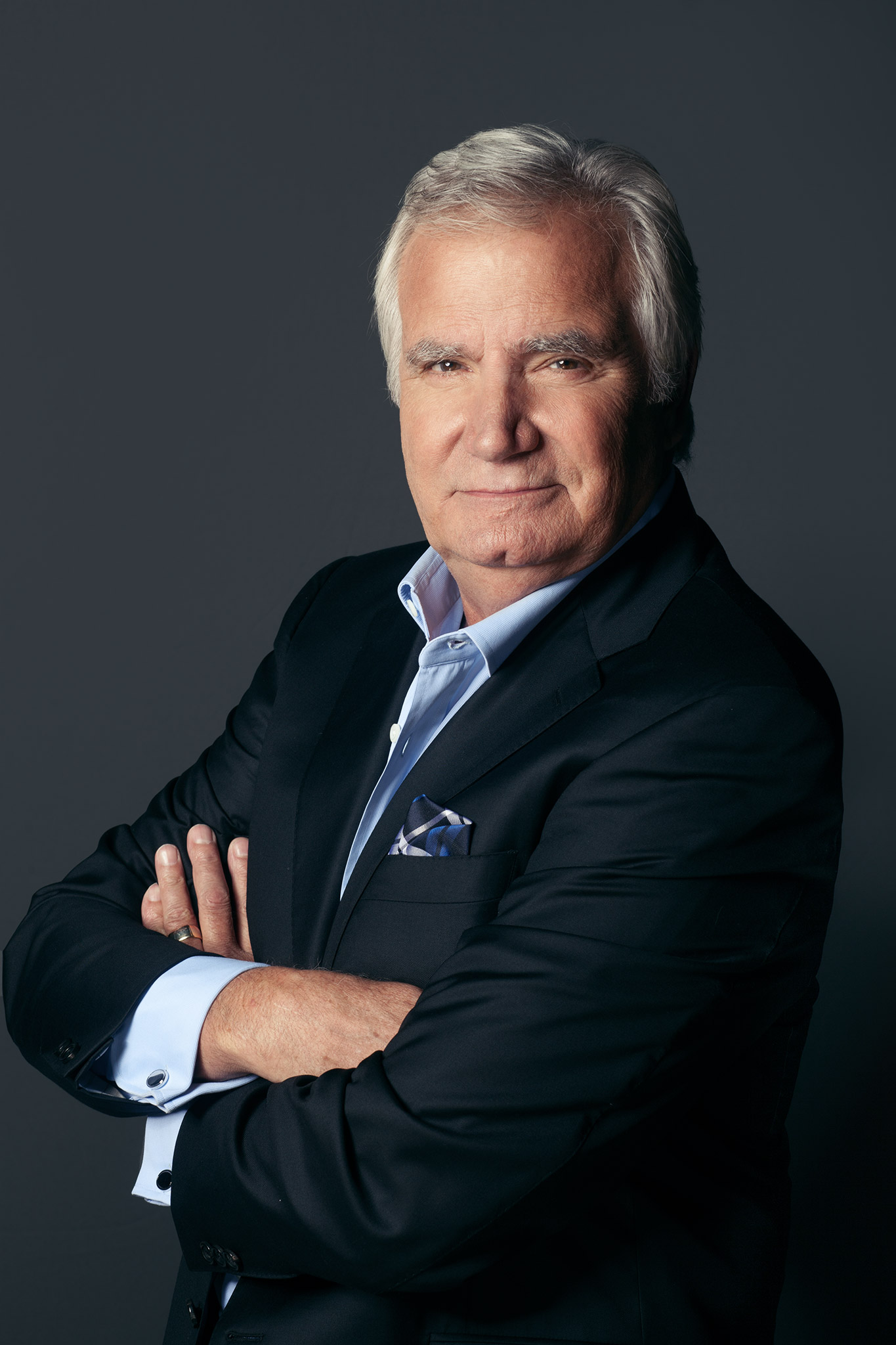
- McCook in 2014
- Born: John Thomas McCook; June 20, 1944 (age 81); Ventura, California, U.S.
- Occupation: Actor
- Years active: 1964–present
- Spouses: Marilyn McPherson (m. 1962; div. 1971) Juliet Prowse (m. 1972; div. 1979) Laurette Spang (m. 1980)
- Children: 4, including Molly McCook

John Thomas McCook (born June 20, 1944) is an American television actor. He first gained prominence for his portrayal of the character Lance Prentiss on the television soap opera The Young and the Restless (from 1975 - 1980). Since March 1987, he has played the role of Eric Forrester on The Bold and the Beautiful, winning the Daytime Emmy Award for Outstanding Lead Actor in a Drama Series in 2022 after four nominations.

== Career ==
McCook was discovered by Jack Warner while performing in a production of West Side Story. He signed to Universal Studios before spending two years in the US Army.

McCook portrayed the character of Lance Prentiss on The Young and the Restless from October 1975 to February 1980, leaving when the show moved to the hour format. Since March 1987, he has played the role of Eric Forrester on The Bold and the Beautiful. Currently, McCook and Katherine Kelly Lang (Brooke Logan) are the show's two longest-serving actors, and both debuted in the first episode. McCook is only eight years older than Ronn Moss, who formerly played his son on the show.

He has performed in musical theatre, and has appeared as a guest on dozens of primetime series. B&B co-star Winsor Harmon once starred with McCook on an episode of Acapulco H.E.A.T. filmed in Mexico. Harmon told Soap Opera Digest about their guest stint on H.E.A.T.:

"I hung out with John McCook the whole time and I kept watching all these people from other countries asking for his autograph. I'm thinking to myself, 'Who the hell is this guy?' So one night, we were drinking Coronas and I asked him why he had so many fans and he explained how B&B was so popular around the world. I had no idea. The more he talked about it, the more I was thinking, 'I want to be on that show.'... The first time I drove into the parking lot, there was John, just pointing at me and laughing. He asked what I was doing here and I told him that I was Thorne. That's when he told me that he was going to be playing my dad. That was just too wild."

In 2001, 2012, and 2018, McCook received a Daytime Emmy nomination in the Outstanding Lead Actor category for his portrayal of Eric Forrester. In 2022, McCook won the Daytime Emmy Award for Outstanding Lead Actor in a Drama Series for the same role.

== Personal life ==
John McCook has been married since 1980 to former actress Laurette Spang, with whom he has three children, Jake Thomas (born 1981), Rebecca Jeanne (born 1983), and Molly (born July 30, 1990) who is also an actress.

He was married twice previously, including to dancer/actress Juliet Prowse (1972–1979), by whom he had one son, Seth (born in August 1972).

John McCook lives with his family in the Greater Los Angeles Area.

== Filmography ==
=== Television ===
| Year | Title | Role(s) | Notes |
|---|---|---|---|
| 1964–1965 | No Time for Sergeants | Jim KInney | Episode: "Have No Uniform Will Travel" |
| 1964–1965 | No Time for Sergeants | Airman | Episode: "A Hatful of Muscles" |
| 1965 | Hank | Gerald Eskow | Episode: "Dunsetter for President" |
| 1965 | Mr. Roberts | Seaman Stefanowski | Episode: "Liberty"; Episode: "Old Rustysides"; Episode: "Happy Birthday, To Who?"; Episode: "Love at 78 RPM; Episode: "Don't Look Now, But Isn't That the War?" |
| 1968 | Run for Your Life | Buck | Episode: "Carol" |
| 1968 | The Name of the Game | Young Detective | Episode: "The Taker" |
| 1968–1969 | Dragnet | Off. Nick Jeffries | Episode: "The Big Problem" |
| 1968–1969 | Dragnet | Ed Hillier | Episode: "Internal Affairs: DR-20" |
| 1968–1969 | Dragnet | Off. Keefer | Episode: "The Joy Riders" |
| 1970 | Bracken's World | Wounded G.I. | Episode: "Love It or Leave It, Change It or Lose It" |
| 1971 | O'Hara, U.S. Treasury | Captain Shafer | Episode: "O'Hara, U.S. Treasury" |
| 1975–1980 | The Young and the Restless | Lance Prentiss | Series regular |
| 1976 | The Rear Guard | Don Crawford | Television film |
| 1977 | Once Upon a Brothers Grimm | Prince Charming | Television film |
| 1980 | CHiPs | Ray Conner | Episode: "Thrill Show" |
| 1980 | The Love Boat | Mark Bridges | Episode: "No Girls for Doc" |
| 1980 | Trapper John, M.D. | Scott Nelson | Episode: "Slim Chance" |
| 1980 | Tourist | Pepi Virgil | Television film |
| 1981 | Too Close for Comfort | Buck | Episode: "Centerford" |
| 1981 | Harper Valley PTA | Calvin Kendall | Episode: "Reunion Fever" |
| 1981–1982 | Three's Company | Doug Cooper | Episode: "And Baby Makes Four" |
| 1981–1982 | Three's Company | Alan | Episode: "An Affair to Forget" |
| 1982 | Romance Theatre | Ross | Recurring role |
| 1982 | Diff'rent Strokes | Tom Wallace | Episode: "The Squatter" |
| 1982 | Fantasy Island | Captain Fitzhugh Ross | Episode: "The Ghost's Story" |
| 1983 | Trapper John, M.D. | Brian Oppenheim | Episode: "May Divorce Be with You" |
| 1983 | Alice | Harry Parker | Episode: "Alice Faces the Music" |
| 1983 | Alice | Customer #1 | Episode: "Vera's Secret Lover" |
| 1983 | Hart to Hart | Dr. Porter | Episode: "As the Hart Turns" |
| 1983 | Dynasty | Fred | Episode: "The Downstairs Bride" |
| 1983 | Family Ties | Tuxedo Man | Episode: "This Year's Model" |
| 1983–1984 | Magnum, P.I. | Roland Martine | Episode: "The Big Blow" |
| 1983–1984 | Magnum, P.I. | Nolan Atherton | Episode: "The Case of Red Faced Thespian" |
| 1984 | Fantasy Island | Steven Curry | Episode: "Games People Play/The Sweet Life" |
| 1984 | Masquerade | Ted Carson | Episode: "Caribbean Holiday" |
| 1984 | Alice | Harry Parker | Episode: "Jolene Is Stuck on Me" |
| 1984 | Hotel | Dr. Chapman | Episode: "Reflections" |
| 1984 | Domestic Life | Lance | Episode: "Cooking with Candy" |
| 1984 | Hill Street Blues | Gameshow Host | Episode: "Lucky Ducks" |
| 1985 | Matt Houston | Frank Denton | Episode: "The Nightmare Man" |
| 1985 | Robert Kennedy and His Times | Interrogator | Television miniseries (3 episodes) |
| 1986 | Remington Steele | Norman Austin | Episode: "Steele on the Air" |
| 1986 | Murder, She Wrote | Harrison Fraser III | Episode: "Keep the Home Fries Burning" |
| 1986 | Highway to Heaven | Todd Jeffries | Episode: "Change to Life" |
| 1986 | Blacke's Magic | Ken Killard | Episode: "Address Unknown" |
| 1986 | L.A. Law | Barry | Episode: "Pilot" |
| 1986 | Our House | Mr. Cathcart | Episode: "Home Again"; Episode: "That Lonesome Old Caboose" |
| 1986 | Simon & Simon | Chandler McKay | Episode: "For the People" |
| 1986 | Simon & Simon | Zachary Tucker | Episode: "Just Because I'm Paranoid" |
| 1986–1987 | Amazing Stories | M.C. | Episode: "Hell Toupee" |
| 1986–1987 | Amazing Stories | Jerry Lane | Episode: "Gershwin's Truck" |
| 1987 | Sidekicks | Bob Small | Episode: "Kicked Upstairs" |
| 1987 | Moonlighting | Robert | Episode: "Blonde on Blonde" |
| 1987 | Still the Beaver | Captain James | Episode: "Material Girl" |
| 1987–present | The Bold and the Beautiful | Eric Forrester | Series regular |
| 1989 | Newhart | Brad Pettibone | Episode: "Attack of the Killer Aunt" |
| 1991 | The New WKRP in Cincinnati | George | Episode: "Where Are We Going?" |
| 1996–2021 | The Young and the Restless | Eric Forrester | Recurring role |
| 1998 | Acapulco H.E.A.T. | Lyle Decker | Episode: "Code Name: Spear of Destiny" |
| 2001 | Epoch | The President | Television film |
| 2005 | Arrested Development | "Scandal Makers" narrator | Episode: "Spring Breakout" |
| 2017 | Jeopardy! | Eric - Clue giver | Episode: "33.88" (dated January 11, 2017) |
| 2021 | Candy Coated Christmas | Fred Gallant | Television film |

=== Film ===
| Year | Title | Role(s) | Notes |
|---|---|---|---|
| 1965 | My Blood Runs Cold | Owen | |
| 1967 | First to Fight | Ford | Uncredited |
| 1970 | There Was a Crooked Man... | Deputy | |
| 1985 | Beverly Hills Cowgirl Blues | Dr. Kenner | |
| 1997 | Scorned 2 | Dr. Greenfield | |
| 2006 | Body of Work | David Hoffman | Short film |
| 2007 | The Invincible Iron Man | Howard Stark (voice) | Direct-to-video |
| 2007 | Plot 7 | Dean Routsong | |
| 2012 | Christmas with You | John | |
| 2013 | Cathedral Canyon | Senator Johnson | |
| 2017 | David's Dinosaur | Professor Henry Longbottom | |

== Awards and nominations ==
List of awards and nominations for John McCook
| Year | Award | Category | Work | Result | Ref. |
|---|---|---|---|---|---|
| 1977 | Soapy Awards | Most Exciting New Actor | The Young and the Restless | Nominated | |
| 1990 | Soap Opera Update MVP Award | Best Actor | The Bold and the Beautiful | Won | |
| 1991 | Soap Opera Digest Award | Outstanding Story Line - “Brooke’s Affair with Eric” - (shared with Katherine Kelly Lang) | The Bold and the Beautiful | Nominated | |
| 1992 | Soap Opera Digest Award | Best Wedding — “Eric and Brooke” (shared with Katherine Kelly Lang) | The Bold and the Beautiful | Nominated | |
| 1998 | Soap Opera Digest Award | Outstanding Supporting Actor | The Bold and the Beautiful | Nominated | |
| 1998 | Telvis Award | Most Popular Television Stars in Finland (shared with Hunter Tylo) | The Bold and the Beautiful | Won | |
| 2001 | Daytime Emmy Award | Outstanding Lead Actor in a Drama Series | The Bold and the Beautiful | Nominated | |
| 2012 | Daytime Emmy Award | Outstanding Lead Actor in a Drama Series | The Bold and the Beautiful | Nominated | |
| 2018 | Daytime Emmy Award | Outstanding Lead Actor in a Drama Series | The Bold and the Beautiful | Nominated | |
| 2018 | Soap Awards France | Best Couple of the Year — "Quinn and Eric" (shared with Rena Sofer) | The Bold and the Beautiful | Nominated | |
| 2020 | Soap Hub Awards | The Bold and the Beautiful Favorite Actor | The Bold and the Beautiful | Nominated | |
| 2021 | Soap Hub Awards | The Bold and the Beautiful Favorite Actor | The Bold and the Beautiful | Won | |
| 2022 | Daytime Emmy Award | Outstanding Lead Actor in a Drama Series | The Bold and the Beautiful | Won | |
| 2024 | Daytime Emmy Award | Outstanding Lead Actor in a Drama Series | The Bold and the Beautiful | Nominated | |
