= Olinda Castielle =

Swedish television personality

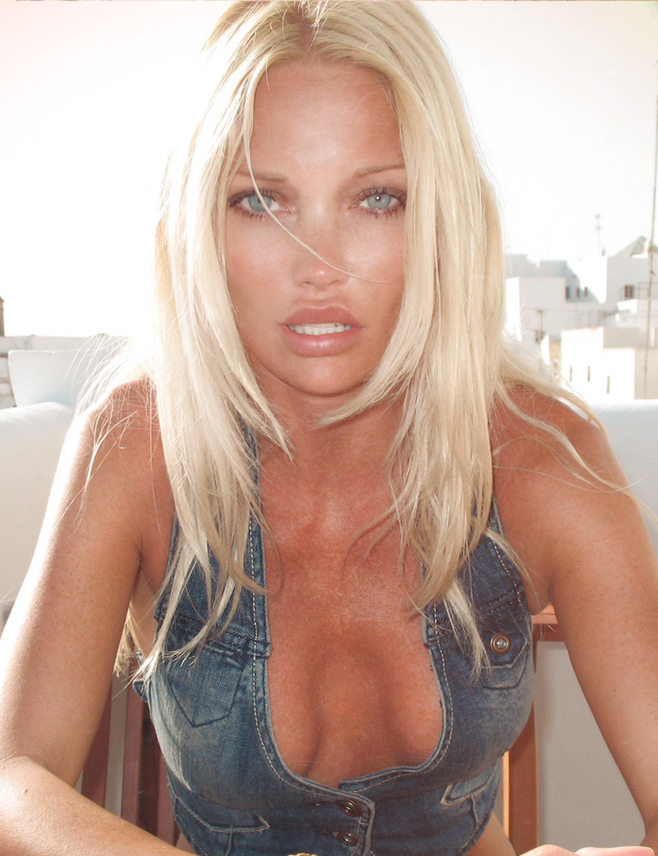
- Olinda Castielle in 2014
- Born: Olinda Joy Borggren; September 30, 1976 (age 49); Stockholm, Sweden
- Other name: Olinda
- Occupations: Entrepreneur, television presenter, artist, actress, model, singer, author, reality TV participant
- Years active: 2003–present
- Partner(s): Patrick Michael Castielle (2005–present)
- Website: http://olindacastielle.com/

Olinda Joy Elisabeth Castielle (born Olinda Borggren, September 30, 1976) is a Swedish television personality. She was a contestant on the first season of the Swedish version of Paradise Hotel as well as the American reality show Joe Millionaire

== Biography ==
=== Swedish television ===
In 2005, Castielle was a contestant on the Swedish version of Paradise Hotel which was broadcast on TV4, where she quickly became one of the most notable contestants of the season. Although she was eliminated twice, she was reinstated by the producers of the show both times, albeit under different circumstances. In the end, Castielle managed to make it to the final week. She became both the most hated and most popular contestant of the season from fellow contestants, managing to amass a huge fan base among Swedish viewers.

She became romantically involved with another contestant on Paradise Hotel, Patrick Michael Castielle. The two were featured in two new specials on TV4's sister channel TV400 after their Paradise Hotel visit.

One special was The OP Tour. In it, the duo showed how their music show was produced, travelled all over Sweden, and Castielle sang her single, "Playboy Bunny”. It was released in Europe and became a big hit in several countries. The song was the most downloaded single in 2005. In Sweden, it was awarded with mobile operator Three's gold mobile most downloaded song.

Their next show was Little Italy, in which the duo went to Italy and met with different Italian celebrities, such as the football player Paolo Maldini. The show aired on TV400.

The Castielles have also been hosts for the talk show Paradise Hotel Extra for the cast members of season two.

=== American television ===
Castielle appeared in the second season of the American reality show Joe Millionaire titled The Next Joe Millionaire in 2003, where she was cast as one of the women who competed for Joe, named David Smith. Olinda was eliminated in the fifth episode, but still remained one of the most talked about contestants, being labelled the villain of the season. Castielle moved back home to Sweden after the show ended, and was cast for Paradise Hotel.

== Other ventures ==
=== Hard Ass Candy ===
Castielle is a painter who creates provocative and morbid art. She created her first collection, Hard Ass Candy, which was to be exhibited in Stockholm, Los Angeles, and NYC in 2013.

=== TV shows ===
- Paradise Hotel (Swedish Edition)
- Paradise Hotel Extra (Season 1 as a guest)
- Paradise Hotel Extra (Season 2 as a host)
- Joe Millionaire (USA edition)
- The OP Tour
- Little Italy
