= Jenny Yang (comedian) =

American comedian

Jenny Yang is an American comedian, writer and actor from Los Angeles.

In 2020, Yang was selected as one of Variety's “10 Comics To Watch” and Vulture's "Comedians You Should and Will Know in 2020".

== Early life and education ==
Yang was born in Taiwan and raised in the South Bay of Los Angeles. Yang graduated with a bachelor's degree in political science at Swarthmore College and was a PPIA Fellow for a Master's in urban planning at University of California, Los Angeles. Before entering comedy, Yang worked for the Service Employees International Union, becoming a director before leaving due to poor work-life balance, getting into standup to "get some of my sanity back".

== Career ==
Yang is regularly featured on BuzzFeed videos on Asian American issues. Yang was featured in the 2013 Showtime documentary Why We Laugh: Funny Women.

Between 2013 and 2018, Yang produced Disoriented Comedy, a nationally touring comedy showcase of Asian American women. Created by Yang, Atsuko Okatsuka and Yola Lu, the show debuted in 2012 at the David Henry Hwang Theater in Little Tokyo in Los Angeles.

In 2014, Yang was the co-host of ISAtv's Angry Asian America along with Phil Yu, founder of the Angry Asian Man blog.

As a television writer, Yang has written for season 1 of HBO Max's Gordita Chronicles, the final two seasons of Fox's Last Man Standing and E!’s late-night talk show Busy Tonight with Busy Philipps.

During the COVID-19 pandemic, Yang created Comedy Crossing a charity stand-up comedy show held inside the Animal Crossing video game and watched live via Zoom, which raised over $30,000 for causes related to the Black Lives Matter movement.

In 2024, she had a recurring role as Xing in The Brothers Sun. In 2026 she is touring with her "Good Egg" stand-up comedy show to 17 immigrant-owned grocery stores across the United States.
