= Jet Jurgensmeyer =

American actor (born 2004)

- Born: November 27, 2004 (age 21); Nashville, Tennessee, U.S.
- Occupation: Actor
- Years active: 2010–present
- Website: jetjurgensmeyer.com

Jet Jurgensmeyer (born November 27, 2004) is an American actor. He began his career as a child actor, playing the role of Spanky in the 2014 film The Little Rascals Save the Day, and Bobby Anderson in the 2016 Disney Channel television film Adventures in Babysitting.

== Early life and career ==
Jurgensmeyer was born and raised in Nashville, Tennessee, where his parents owned a live music and dinner show restaurant.

Jurgensmeyer made his television debut with a guest role on the CBS television series CSI: Crime Scene Investigation in 2010. In 2012 he was cast as Spanky, one of the lead roles, in Alex Zamm's 2014 film The Little Rascals Save the Day. He has appeared in films such as American Sniper and Devil's Knot. In 2016 he appeared in the Disney Channel film Adventures in Babysitting, playing Bobby the middle son of one of the sets of children being babysat. The same year Jurgensmeyer was cast in Nickelodeon's Legends of the Hidden Temple television film, playing Dudley the youngest of the three siblings who travel through a temple. In 2017, he provided the voice of the young version of Peyton Manning's character Guapo in Blue Sky Studios' Ferdinand. From 2018 to 2020, he portrayed Boyd Baxter on the Fox comedy series Last Man Standing, and from 2019 to 2021, he was part of the cast of the Disney Junior children's television series T.O.T.S. voicing Pip the Penguin.

== Filmography ==
=== Film ===
Year	Title	Role	Notes
2010	Redemption Road	Jet	
2012	Lukewarm	Young Luke	
2013	Cold Turkey	Cypress	Originally titled Pasadena
2013	Devil's Knot	Stevie Branch	
2014	The Little Rascals Save the Day	Spanky	Direct-to-video film
2014	A Belle for Christmas	Elliot Barrows	
2014	American Sniper	Colton's friend	
2015	Woodlawn	Todd	
2017	Ferdinand	Young Guapo	Voice role
2017	Cupid's Proxy	Justin	
2018	Next Gen	Junior	Voice role

=== Television ===
Year	Title	Role	Notes
2010	CSI: Crime Scene Investigation	Conner Wilson	Episode: "Lost and Found"
2011	Grey's Anatomy	Jack Hobart	Episode: "Unaccompanied Minor"
2011	Hail Mary	Billy	Unsold television pilot
2011–2012	Special Agent Oso	Aiden / Gabriel / Rudy	Voice roles; 3 episodes
2012	Bad Girls	Aiden	Television film
2012	Austin & Ally	Stevie	Episode: "Austin & Jessie & Ally All Star New Year"
2013	Last Rights the Series	Concord	Television film
2013	Changing Seasons	Bryce	Television film
2013–2016	Bubble Guppies	Nonny	Main voice role (seasons 3–4)
2014	Hot in Cleveland	Anthony	Episode: "The Italian Job"
2014	Marry Me	Mason	Episode: "Scary Me"
2015	Pickle and Peanut	Dr. Pamplemousse	Episode: "Cookie Racket/Busted Arm"
2015	Black-ish	Caleb	Episodes: "Any Given Saturday", "The Johnson Show"
2016	Adventures in Babysitting	Bobby Anderson	Television film (Disney)
2016	Legends of the Hidden Temple	Dudley	Television film (Nickelodeon)
2016–2019	Shimmer and Shine	Kaz	Recurring voice role, 5 episodes
2017	Hey Arnold!: The Jungle Movie	Stinky	Television film (Nickelodeon); voice role
2017–2018	Will & Grace	Skip	Episodes: "Grandpa Jack", "Tex and the City"
2017–2019	The Stinky & Dirty Show	Dirty	Voice role; replaced Jacob Guenther
2017–2022	Puppy Dog Pals	Orby / Dudley	Voice role; 4 episodes
2018	Babysitter's Nightmare	Toby Andrews	Television film (Lifetime)
2018–2020	Last Man Standing	Boyd Baxter	Main role (season 7); recurring role (season 8)
2019	The Legend of 5 Mile Cave	Tommy Tilwicky	Television film (INSP)
2019–2021	T.O.T.S.	Pip the Penguin	Main voice role (seasons 1–2)
2020	Ozark	Young Marty Byrde	Episode: "Boss Fight"
2021	The Chicken Squad	Cornelius	Voice role; episode: "House Guest/The Wrong Stuff"
2022	Interrupting Chicken	Boy / Guard Monster	Voice role; episode: "Dawn of Wonder Chicken / The Chicken Who Cried Wolf"
