= Molly McCook =

American actress (born 1990)

- Born: July 30, 1990 (age 35); Los Angeles, California, U.S.
- Occupation: Actress
- Years active: 2010–present
- Known for: Last Man Standing
- Spouse: John Krause (m. 2019)
- Parents: John McCook (father); Laurette Spang (mother)

Molly McCook (born July 30, 1990) is an American television and stage actress. She played a leading role in Fox's Last Man Standing (2018–2021).

== Early life ==
McCook was born on July 30, 1990, in Los Angeles. She is daughter of actor John McCook and actress Laurette Spang.

== Career ==
Early in her career, McCook had minor roles in television's 10 Things I Hate About You and Glee, both filmed in 2009 and released in 2010. She acted in a five-episode arc of the soap opera, The Bold and the Beautiful, with her father, John, a series regular, in 2010. McCook appeared that same year in the music video for "If Eyes Could Speak", a single released by Devon Werkheiser. She also maintains a YouTube channel in which she displays her singing abilities.

McCook has appeared in episodes of Monk, Hot in Cleveland, Glory Daze, and Free Agents.

In 2012, McCook appeared as Madison Evans in a four episode arc of the short-lived, low-budget series, Never Fade Away. That year, McCook also played Natalie in the horror film, Excision; and then once again joined her father in acting in the short film, Christmas Without You.

In 2013, she was in an episode of Agents of S.H.I.E.L.D. and the following year in an episode of Modern Family. McCook's character featured heavily in the web series, Guidance, in its inaugural season (2016). She was in several episodes of The Ranch in 2016–2018. Since 2019, McCook has appeared on the Freeform network in the recurring role of court clerk, Rebecca, in season one of the Good Trouble spin-off of The Fosters TV show.

In 2015, McCook originated the stage role of character Annette Hargrove in Cruel Intentions: The Musical in Los Angeles, the part played by Reese Witherspoon in the film.

From 2018 to 2021, she starred as the major character, middle daughter Mandy, in the last three seasons of Last Man Standing on the Fox Network, a role she inherited from Molly Ephraim after the show's hiatus and network switch in 2017–2018.

In 2021, McCook starred alongside her father in the Discovery+ produced film, Candy Coated Christmas. The Christmas-themed movie appeared on the Food Network, a first for the broadcaster.

== Personal life ==
She and Broadway actor John Krause were married on September 7, 2019.

== Filmography ==
Television and film roles
Year	Title	Role	Notes
2006	Monk	Emily J	Episode: "Mr. Monk and the Big Game"
2010	Glee	Sophomore singer	Episode: "Dream On"
2010	10 Things I Hate About You	Stacy	Episode: "Meat is Murder"
2010	The Bold and the Beautiful	Margot / Friend #1	Recurring role, 5 episodes
2011	Glory Daze	Andrea	Episodes: "Some Like It Hot Tub", "Hit Me With Your Test Shot"
2012	Free Agents	Shauna Daniels	Episode: "The Kids are Alright..."
2012	Never Fade Away	Madison Evans	Web series; main role
2013	Agents of S.H.I.E.L.D.	Laura Hayward	Episode: "The Bridge"
2013	10 Rules for Sleeping Around	Jaymee	Film
2014	Modern Family	Bridesmaid	Episode: "Haley's 21st Birthday"
2015	Hot in Cleveland	Jessica #1	Episode: "Family Affair"
2015	Murder in the First	Rian Green	Episode: "Oh, Mexico!"
2016	Sorry, Ari	Allison	Episode: "I Voted!"
2016	Guidance	Polly	Web series; recurring role (season 2), 7 episodes
2016	Cruel Intentions	Emily	Unsold television pilot
2016	Trash Fire	Aimee	Film
2016–2018	The Ranch	Darlene	Recurring role (seasons 1–3), 5 episodes
2017	The Landlord	Alyssa Haroldson	Television film; also known as Fatherly Obsession
2017	His Wives and Daughters	Tammy Banks	Unsold television pilot
2018–2021	Last Man Standing	Mandy Baxter-Anderson	Main role (seasons 7–9)
2019	Good Trouble	Rebecca	Recurring role (season 1), 6 episodes
2021	Candy Coated Christmas	Molly Gallant	Streaming film
2023	Not Dead Yet	Charlotte	Episode: "Not Friends Yet"
2025	The Rookie	Cassie/Denise	Episode: "Speed"
