= Christoph Sanders =

American actor (born 1988)

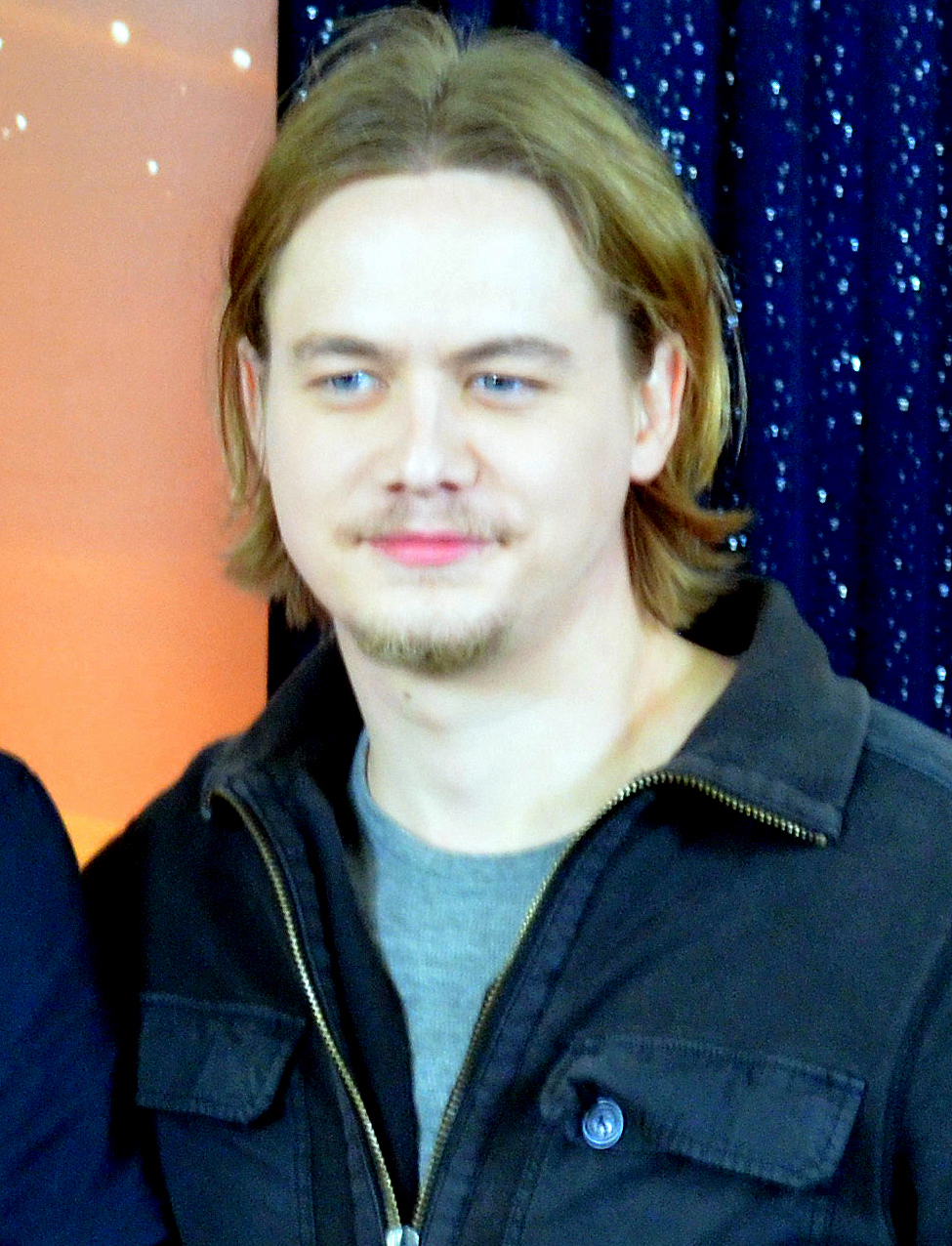
- Sanders in 2012
- Born: April 21, 1988 (age 38); Arden, North Carolina, U.S.
- Occupation: Actor
- Years active: 2006–present
- Known for: Last Man Standing

Christopher "Christoph" Sanders (born April 21, 1988) is an American actor who is best known for his role as Ned Banks in the television series Ghost Whisperer and Kyle Anderson in the sitcom Last Man Standing on ABC (2011-2017) and FOX (2018-2021).

== Early life ==
Sanders was born in Arden, North Carolina, and grew up in nearby Hendersonville, North Carolina. He was home-schooled and participated in such extra curricular activities as soccer and the Boy Scouts of America. He went on to attain scouting's highest rank of Eagle Scout. Concerning the difference Scouting made in his life, Sanders says, "when you spend that much time working on something, it becomes a part of you. Being an Eagle Scout affects your outlook on your fellow man." While growing up, he considered engineering as a possible career. He took drafting classes at Blue Ridge Community College for two years and had been accepted at UNC Wilmington, but decided that acting was what he wanted to do instead.

== Career ==
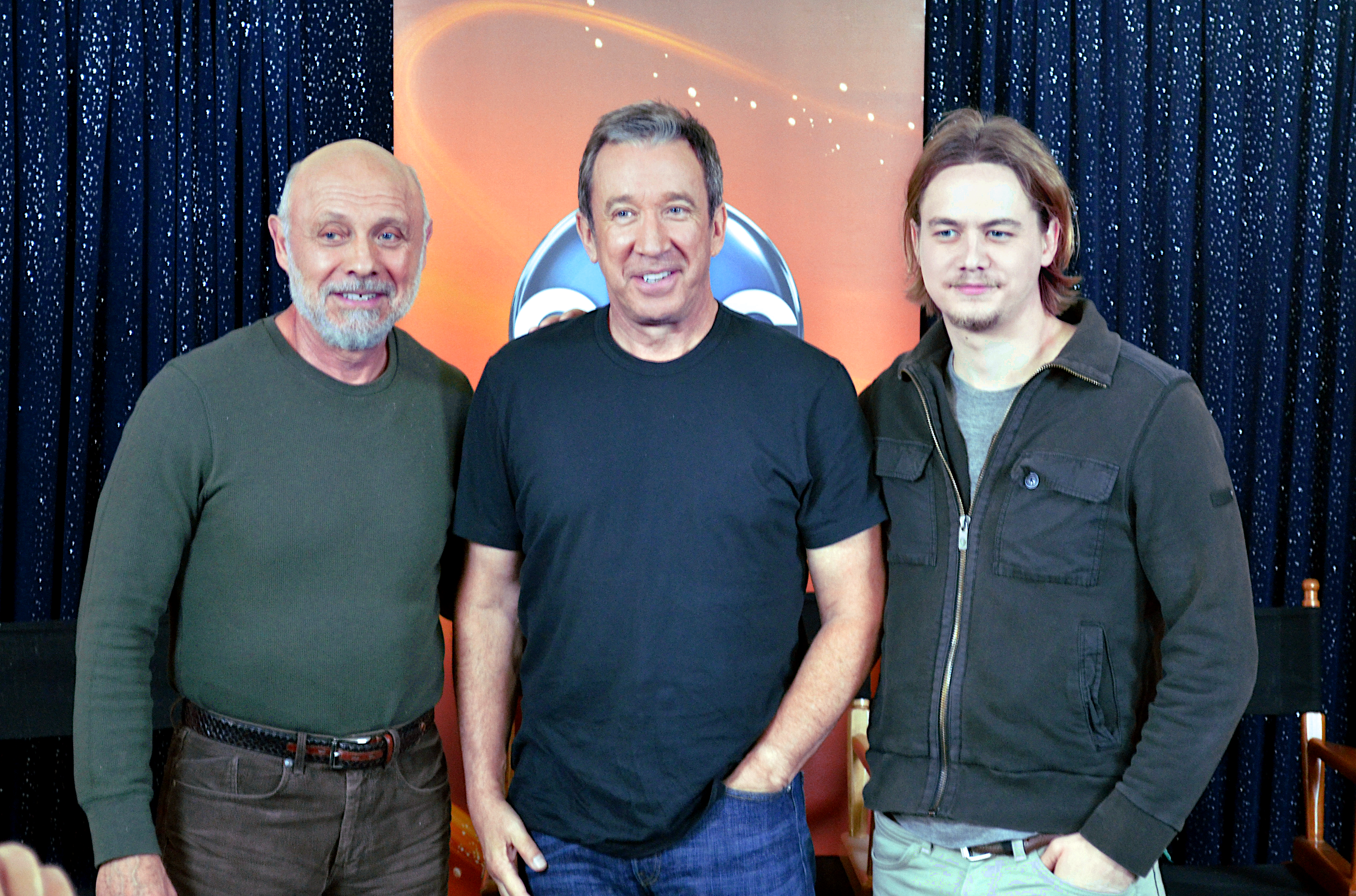
Sanders, with fellow Last Man Standing stars Héctor Elizondo and Tim Allen.

Sanders first became interested in acting at the age of 9 when he began taking classes at the Flat Rock Playhouse, the state theater of North Carolina. He began with basic drama classes before moving on to an intermediate level and finally being invited to join their YouTheater company and gaining membership in its elite conservatory. He graduated from the conservatory program at the age of 18. While there he appeared in more than 16 productions including A Christmas Carol; The Lion, the Witch, and the Wardrobe; and Bye, Bye Birdie. He got his first agent when he was 12 and at the age of 16 did a series of television commercials in Georgia for General Mills.

He made his film debut in 2006 with a small role in Talladega Nights: The Ballad of Ricky Bobby which was filmed primarily in and around Charlotte, North Carolina. A role soon followed that in the somewhat controversial movie Hounddog which was shot on a plantation near Wilmington, North Carolina. Much of the film's controversy stemmed from a pivotal scene in which a young girl, played by then 12-year-old actress Dakota Fanning, was raped by Sanders' character. It was a role he found to be challenging but one that gave him a chance to prove the range of his acting ability. When asked about the controversial scene, Sanders responded, "That's just one part of the film. Tragedies like that happen daily in real life, and I think if this film opens a few more eyes, it is definitely worth it. Movies can have that power."

In January 2007, he moved to Los Angeles, where there were more opportunities to pursue acting full-time. He got a part in a TV pilot within three months of being in Hollywood, but the network didn't pick the show up. He spent the next several months auditioning before landing a part in the movie Legally Blondes and the role of Ned Banks on Ghost Whisperer. He took over the role of Ned, which was previously held by Tyler Patrick Jones, when producers decided to age the character by a few years in order to explore more mature story lines. This was only a recurring guest role in season three, but due to the character's popularity, Sanders became a part of the regular cast at the beginning of season four.

He was cast as Kyle Anderson in the Last Man Standing TV show starring Tim Allen. His character was initially the boyfriend of the eldest daughter of Tim Allen's character, but after the first season, the producers aged the eldest daughter to play a more motherly role. Sanders' character eventually became the boyfriend, and later husband, to the middle daughter.

== Personal life ==
An avid outdoorsman, Sanders enjoys such activities as hiking, camping, and surfing. He also describes himself as "a pretty great cook."

In June 2025, Sanders married actress Elizabeth McLaughlin.

== Filmography ==
=== Film ===
Year	Title	Role
2006	Talladega Nights: The Ballad of Ricky Bobby	Pizza Delivery Boy
2007	Hounddog	Wooden's Boy
2009	Legally Blondes	Brad
2010	Lies in Plain Sight	Christian
2018	Big Kill	Jim Andrews
2020	Faith Based	Hoyt

=== Television ===
Year	Title	Role	Notes
2007	Family of the Year	Mark Anderson	series pilot
2008–2010	Ghost Whisperer	Ned Banks	Recurring Season 3, Main Cast Seasons 4-5
2010	Pair of Kings	Tristan	Episode: "Big Kings on Campus"
2011	CSI	Kurt Dawson	Episode: "Turn On, Tune In, Drop Dead"
2011–2021	Last Man Standing	Kyle Anderson	Main cast; Director: "Love & Negotiation"
2025	Leverage: Redemption	Frank	Episode: "The Digital Frankenstein Job"
2025	Monster: The Ed Gein Story	Randy	Episode: "Ice"
2026	The Last Thing He Told Me	Young Nicholas	Episode: “Isia Moriendo Renascor”
