= Krista Marie Yu =

American actress (born 1988)

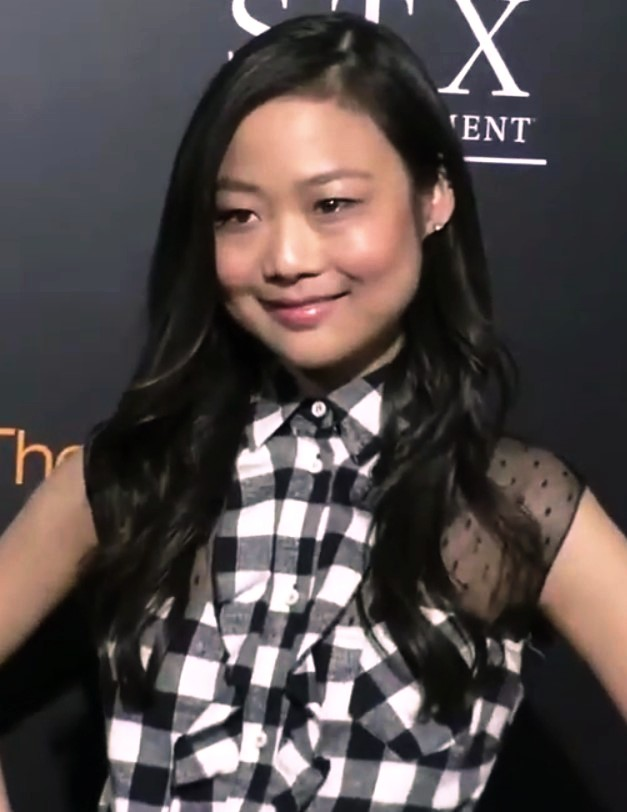
- Krista Marie Yu, in 2016
- Born: October 25, 1988 (age 37); Alameda, California, U.S.
- Education: Carnegie Mellon University (BFA)
- Occupation: Actress
- Years active: 1998–present

Krista Marie Yu (born October 25, 1988) is an American actress best known for her roles on television. She played the main role of Molly Park on the ABC family sitcom Dr. Ken. In August 2018, it was announced that Yu would play the recurring role of Jen on Fox's Last Man Standing. On January 18, 2019, Fox announced that Yu had been promoted to series regular. Most recently, Krista Marie Yu has played Elaine Kim on Hulu's Reboot.

== Early life ==
Yu was born in Alameda, California, on October 25, 1988. She is a fifth generation Chinese American. Yu began taking ballet lessons at three years old.

Yu graduated from Carnegie Mellon University with a BFA in acting in 2011.

== Career ==
Yu is an actress and has appeared on television shows such as The Thundermans, Switched at Birth and Agent Carter, among others. She also played a major role in the Corridor Digital web series/ YouTube movie Sync and appeared in WongFu Productions web series Just Another Nice Guy.

In 2015, Yu joined the cast of Dr. Ken, a television sitcom inspired by series lead Ken Jeong's time as a physician, playing Ken's daughter, Molly.

In January 2019, Yu was promoted to series regular on the television sitcom Last Man Standing as foreign exchange student, Jen.

In 2022, Yu booked Hulu's Reboot, alongside Keegan-Michael Key, Judy Greer, Rachel Bloom, Johnny Knoxville, Paul Reiser, and Calum Worthy. The show received a Critic's Choice Nomination for Best Comedy Series.

== Filmography ==
=== Films ===
- 2015: Love the Coopers – Lily the Florist
- 2010: Death to Romance – Hot Woman #2 (short film)
- 2002: The Theater of Martin Lim – Krista (short film)

=== Television ===
- 2022: Reboot – Elaine Kim (Main cast)
- 2021: Carmen Sandiego (TV series) – Xifeng (Episode: "The Beijing Bullion Caper")
- 2018–2021: Last Man Standing – Jen (series regular)
- 2017: Just Another Nice Guy (TV miniseries) – Julia (main cast)
- 2015–2017: Dr. Ken – Molly (main cast)
- 2015: Hand of God – Courtney (Episode: "Your Inside Voice")
- 2015: Agent Carter - Edith Oberon (Episode: "A Sin to Err")
- 2013–2015: The Thundermans – Ashley (3 episodes)
- 2013: The Middle – Maya (Episode: "Hallelujah Hoedown")
- 2013: Cougar Town – Girl (2 episodes)
- 2013: Switched at Birth – Colette (Episode: "Mother and Child Divided")
- 2012: I'm Not a DJ (TV movie) – Translator
- 2012: Parenthood – Waitress (Episode: "Family Portrait")
