= List of Last Man Standing episodes =

Last Man Standing is an American sitcom that premiered on ABC on October 11, 2011. Created by Jack Burditt, the series stars Tim Allen as Mike Baxter, previously a widely travelled outdoorsman but now a director of marketing at an outdoor sporting goods store in Colorado, whose home life is dominated by women: his wife Vanessa (Nancy Travis) and their three daughters Eve (Kaitlyn Dever), Mandy (Molly Ephraim for seasons 1–6 and Molly McCook for seasons 7–9), and Kristin (Alexandra Krosney for season 1 and Amanda Fuller for seasons 2–9). Héctor Elizondo also stars as Ed Alzate, Mike's boss at his sporting goods store "Outdoor Man", while Christoph Sanders appears as Kyle Anderson, a young employee of Outdoor Man and Mandy's boyfriend and later husband. In 2018, Fox picked up the series for a seventh season. In April 2019, Fox renewed the series for an eighth season. In May 2020, Fox renewed the series for a ninth and final season which premiered on January 3, 2021.

During the course of the series, 194 episodes of Last Man Standing aired over nine seasons, between October 11, 2011, and May 20, 2021.

== Series overview ==
Season	Episodes	Originally released		
Season	Episodes	First released	Last released	Network
1	24	October 11, 2011	May 8, 2012	ABC
2	18	November 2, 2012	March 22, 2013	ABC
3	22	September 20, 2013	April 25, 2014	ABC
4	22	October 3, 2014	April 17, 2015	ABC
5	22	September 25, 2015	April 22, 2016	ABC
6	22	September 23, 2016	March 31, 2017	ABC
7	22	September 28, 2018	May 10, 2019	Fox
8	21	January 2, 2020	April 30, 2020	Fox
9	21	January 3, 2021	May 20, 2021	Fox

== Episodes ==
=== Season 1 (2011–12) ===
No. overall	No. in season	Title	Directed by	Written by	Original release date	Prod. code	U.S. viewers (millions)
1	1	"Pilot"	John Pasquin	Jack Burditt	October 11, 2011	1ATP79	13.19
Mike Baxter, a director of marketing at an outdoor sporting goods store, returns home from traveling to greet his wife Vanessa and his three teenage daughters: the eldest Kristin is a single mother caring for her son Boyd in the Baxter family home, middle daughter Mandy is not academic but more concerned with her popularity with the boys at school, and the youngest Eve is a tomboy inspired by her father. At home, Mike manages to upset all of his daughters. At work, Mike is told there will be no more field trips and he is given a new assignment to promote the company's website. He also arranges that Kyle, a young employee at the store, will date Mandy because Mike doesn't approve of her current boyfriend. However, Kyle mistakes Kristin for Mandy, and dates Kristin instead.
2	2	"Last Baby Proofing Standing"	John Pasquin	Linda Videtti Figueiredo	October 11, 2011	1ATP01	13.19
Kristin decides that the Baxters need to hire a baby-proofer (Paul F. Tompkins) for their home to protect Boyd, and when Vanessa sides with their daughter, they go ahead, despite Mike's objections, which leads to some hilarious repercussions. Meanwhile, fed up with Mandy constantly taking his money, Mike decides to get her a job as a pizza delivery girl, but when Vanessa takes issue with this, Mike and Kyle secretly follow Mandy.
3	3	"Grandparents Day"	John Pasquin	Liz Astrof	October 18, 2011	1ATP02	10.34
It is grandparents' day at Boyd's daycare center, and Vanessa insists that Mike attend with her. However, Mike's comments about a boy dressed as a fairy princess get Boyd expelled from the center, so, rather than apologize, Mike takes his grandson to work with him. Meanwhile, when an older grandmother compares Vanessa to herself, Vanessa attempts to make her style more youthful, with some help from Mandy.
4	4	"Last Halloween Standing"	John Pasquin	Marsh McCall	October 25, 2011	1ATP03	9.88
Mike is upset when Eve tells him that she does not want to continue their annual tradition of trick-or-treating because of her crush on Victor Blake (Kenton Duty), who has told her he thinks Halloween is immature and for kids. So Mike decides to dress up Boyd and take him trick-or-treating, directly disobeying Kristin's wishes, and inadvertently brings home a kid wearing a costume similar to Boyd's. When calling on Ed, Mike meets his friend Elvira. Mike also gets a costume for Mandy but not quite as revealing as the one she wanted, while Vanessa's 'pirate princess' costume draws the attention of the Baxters' neighbor Bill (David Anthony Higgins).
5	5	"Co-Ed Softball"	John Pasquin	Kevin Hench	November 1, 2011	1ATP04	9.42
Mike's boss Ed is irritated when the Outdoor Man company softball team votes to go co-ed, and he vows to track down the 'for' votes one-by-one. Meanwhile, Mike is afraid of Ed's reaction when he finds out that Mike voted for co-ed, so he has Eve join the team to make up for it. The move backfires when Eve usurps Mike's role as star pitcher with her far-superior skills. Mandy begins filling out college applications, but is stumped by the essay she has to write, and Kristin ponders what her own future holds while she helps her sister.
6	6	"Good Cop, Bad Cop"	John Pasquin	Eben Russell	November 8, 2011	1ATP07	9.26
Mandy intends to enter a teen modeling competition, a plan which Vanessa does not approve of. Sick of being the "bad cop", Vanessa persuades Mike to stop Mandy from entering. Mike is reluctant to give up his role as the "good cop", but this changes when he views the revealing pictures Mandy wants to send in. Mike then visits the family of Mandy's boyfriend Travis after he discovers that the semi-nude pictures Mandy took for the modeling competition have been forwarded to Travis' phone. Meanwhile, Kristin tries to stand up to her boss for a raise, but ends up saving his life instead.
7	7	"Home Security"	John Pasquin	Eben Russell	November 15, 2011	1ATP05	9.06
Vanessa encourages Mike to join the neighborhood watch. Mike then spends some idle time on his shift sharing neighborhood gossip that Vanessa had relayed to him in private. Meanwhile, Ed has trouble saying "no" to a certain supplier's sales pitches.
8	8	"House Rules"	John Pasquin	Andy Gordon	November 22, 2011	1ATP08	9.29
Mike finds out that Kyle has spent the night in Kristin's bedroom, although Kristin insists that "nothing happened". Taking Ed's advice, Mike lays down new rules in the house, but Kristin's response is to move out, taking Boyd to move in with Kyle. Eve has her first period, making her cranky.
9	9	"Guess Who's Coming to Dinner"	John Pasquin	Kevin Hench	November 29, 2011	1ATP09	10.32
Mike and Vanessa meet their new neighbors, a lesbian couple. Mike ends up being good friends with one of the women until she takes one of his joshing remarks as an insult. The girls create a singing group called The Inglorious Baxters and Kyle helps them make a music video about Mandy's lying boyfriend, Travis, which they post online. Kyle tries to jokingly insult Ed, but Ed does not get the joke.
10	10	"Last Christmas Standing"	John Pasquin	Jack Burditt	December 6, 2011	1ATP10	8.79
Ryan (Nick Jonas), the father of Kristin's baby, unexpectedly comes back to town wanting to be in his son's life. Kyle begins to feel threatened by Ryan's arrival. Mandy works as a helper elf for Santa Claus Ed in the Outdoor Man store, until she demands better work benefits.
11	11	"The Passion of the Mandy"	John Pasquin	Marsh McCall	December 13, 2011	1ATP06	7.51
Mandy starts accompanying Mike to work after sharing her surprisingly good marketing ideas, but her recently successful campaign has Ed upset. Vanessa becomes overwhelmed with trying to spend more time at her job while still running the house. Eve gets upset when Victor Blake does not ask her to a school dance, and Vanessa is pleased that this is one time when Eve needs her Mom more than her Dad.
12	12	"Moon Over Kenya"	John Pasquin	Steve Baldikoski & Bryan Behar	January 3, 2012	1ATP12	7.93
Chad Bickle (Steve Talley), a brash young pro fisherman, renews Mike's interest in traveling the world for work, which does not sit well with Vanessa. After seeing Mike and Vanessa's family life going so well, Chad decides to quit pro fishing to get back together with his girlfriend. Ed hires Tony Hawk to replace Chad. Meanwhile, Mandy decides to become a vegan, but Kristin and Eve are convinced it is one of her passing phases and tease her about it.
13	13	"Take Your Daughter to Work"	John Pasquin	Joe Port & Joe Wiseman	January 10, 2012	1ATP13	7.57
Ed hires his daughter Gabriella (Jamie-Lynn Sigler) as a marketing consultant and her ideas threaten Mike's standing at the company. Mike and Eve bring home a stray dog that Mandy believes she is allergic to, but her allergies are really a childhood lie started by Vanessa.
14	14	"Odd Couple Out"	John Pasquin	Liz Astrof & Linda Videtti Figueiredo	January 17, 2012	1ATP11	8.59
Vanessa finds out that her neighbor, Michelle (Danielle Bisutti), has not invited her and Mike to a party. She later finds out that Mike was the reason why, due to him insulting Michelle's profession on a previous occasion. So he agrees to change his ways by being more sociable. Eve damages Mandy's car, while trying to move it out of the garage.
15	15	"House of Spirits"	John Pasquin	Liz Astrof & Linda Videtti Figueiredo	February 7, 2012	1ATP16	7.78
After discovering that two elderly women had previously died in the Baxter home, the Baxter daughters fear that ghosts are haunting the house. After hiring a medium to investigate, Vanessa also becomes scared. Elsewhere, Ed keeps borrowing cash from Kyle.
16	16	"Tree of Strife"	John Pasquin	Kevin Hench	February 7, 2012	1ATP14	8.02
Mandy meets Kim Kardashian at a book signing and freaks out, and becomes the butt of jokes from her sisters when video of her way-over-the-top reaction appears on the local TV news. Mike and the Baxter family fight City Hall after a tree which they had planted on their property is listed to be cut down.
17	17	"Adrenaline"	John Pasquin	Andy Gordon	February 14, 2012	1ATP15	7.64
Mike gets NASCAR driver Tony Stewart and his car to spice up the Outdoor Man retail space, but the car later goes missing. Kristin, wanting to go skydiving, has Vanessa looking back to when she took more chances before becoming a mother.
18	18	"Baxter & Sons"	John Pasquin	Story by : Kim Flagg; Teleplay by : Marsh McCall	February 21, 2012	1ATP17	7.46
Mike's father Bud (Robert Forster) and younger brother Jim (Mike Rowe) visit, hoping to win a bid to build a new Outdoor Man store. Jim tries to get a loan from a bank, but when the loan officer (Frankie Muniz) turns him down, Jim refuses to accept Mike's offer to countersign the loan because of their sibling rivalry. The Baxter girls think Bud is lonely since the death of his wife and try to set him up on an online dating site.
19	19	"Ding Dong Ditch"	John Pasquin	Jon Haller	February 28, 2012	1ATP18	7.50
The Baxters are annoyed when teenage prankster Ben Milbauer (Uriah Shelton) repeatedly rings their door bell and runs off, but when Mike booby-traps the door, Ben gets hurt on their property. Ben's father Frank (Alex Skuby) orders Mike to cover the boy's hospital bill and Mike discovers that Eve and Ben have secretly been dating. Kristin begins her college classes, but has a difficult time getting acclimated. Kyle gets hurt on the job, causing Ed to fear that Kyle will sue him.
20	20	"Animal Wrongs"	John Pasquin	Marsh McCall	March 20, 2012	1ATP19	6.98
Mandy worries when Mike does not like her new boyfriend, Terrence (Shane Coffey), who is an animal rights activist. Kyle discovers that he has Basque ancestors, like Ed, but the two have a disagreement after learning their ancestors are from rival families.
21	21	"Wherefore Art Thou, Mike Baxter"	John Pasquin	Kevin Hench	April 10, 2012	1ATP20	6.84
Mike and Ed invite Kyle as a last-minute substitute for Outdoor Man's annual grudge competition against Ted's Tacklebox, but fear Kyle is not very good at outdoor sports. When the competition runs late, Mike has to miss Mandy's school play. Vanessa offends both Eve and Mandy, when she is overheard saying she does not care to attend their extracurricular activities.
22	22	"This Bud's For You"	John Pasquin	Steve Baldikoski & Bryan Behar	April 17, 2012	1ATP22	6.51
Bud moves into town to begin working on the new Outdoor Man store. Mike is upset that Bud's girlfriend Stella (Deborah May), who Mike did not know about before, has moved in with him. After getting a company physical, Mike is told he has high blood pressure.
23	23	"The Spotlight"	John Pasquin	Eben Russell	May 1, 2012	1ATP23	6.52
Vanessa is nominated for an award for her volunteer efforts at the local school, but circumstances put Mike in the spotlight, so he has to try and make amends. Mandy tries to help Eve with her fears about starting high school. Ed wants to market an action-figure model of Mike in Outdoor Man, but the end product received from China has Ed thinking he must brush up on his Mandarin.
24	24	"Found Money"	John Pasquin	Andy Gordon	May 8, 2012	1ATP21	6.62
Vanessa's sweet-but-flighty sister, April (Christina Moore), pays a visit. This irritates Mike, who is convinced April only wants to ask for another loan, and he has just used some extra cash to buy a tank so he and Ed can run over old cars and boats. Meanwhile, Kyle and Kristin agree to break up, but Kyle is more worried about what Mike will think.

=== Season 2 (2012–13) ===
On May 11, 2012, ABC renewed Last Man Standing for a second season. Beginning this season, Amanda Fuller now plays Kristin, replacing Alexandra Krosney. Flynn Morrison was also added to the main cast as an age-advanced Boyd, replacing twins Evan and Luke Kruntchev. Jordan Masterson recurs as Ryan, Boyd's father, replacing Nick Jonas, who guest starred in one episode in the previous season. The second season initially received a thirteen-episode order, but ABC announced on November 12, 2012, that an additional three scripts had been ordered. The episode order was then extended to five additional episodes, taking the final total to eighteen for the season. Tim Allen's former Home Improvement co-star Richard Karn guest starred in the episode "Attractive Architect", playing the character Bill McKendree. Karn reprised his role again in the episode "The Fight". Jonathan Taylor Thomas, another Home Improvement co-star of Allen's, guest starred in the season finale, "College Girl", as the character John Baker.

Season 2 episodes
No. overall	No. in season	Title	Directed by	Written by	Original release date	Prod. code	U.S. viewers (millions)
25	1	"Voting"	John Pasquin	Tim Doyle & Jon Haller	November 2, 2012	2ATP03	8.07
Mandy is voting for the first time, with Mike urging her to vote for Mitt Romney, while Kristin and Ryan urge her to vote for Barack Obama. Vanessa maintains secrecy about how she votes, which she claims she has done throughout her marriage to Mike. Eve, Ed, and Kyle compete in fantasy football, which has ramifications at work for Kyle when he will not make a trade with his boss, Ed.
26	2	"Dodgeball Club"	John Pasquin	Kevin Hench	November 9, 2012	2ATP01	7.44
Ryan has dodgeball banned from Boyd's school, which infuriates Mike to the point that he teaches Boyd and his friends dodgeball in the Baxter backyard. Ed and Kyle volunteer in a search and rescue team. Mandy begins dating her school's star quarterback, which has her asking for Eve's help to brush up on football facts.
27	3	"High Expectations"	John Pasquin	Michael Shipley	November 16, 2012	2ATP07	7.13
Vanessa invites new neighbors Carol and Chuck Larabee (Erika Alexander and Jonathan Adams), an African-American couple, over for drinks after their car is egged. Mike expresses discomfort over them visiting – not because they are black, but simply because they are neighbors. After Mike refuses to let Eve quit soccer, she skips soccer practice and gets drunk at a friend's party. Mandy comes to the rescue to help Eve, even though it means walking out on rehearsals for her high school musical where she is hoping to land a part.
28	4	"Ed's Twice Ex-Wife"	John Pasquin	Sarah Jane Cunningham & Suzie V. Freeman	November 23, 2012	2ATP02	6.68
Ed begins to develop old feelings for his third ex-wife Wanda (Robin Riker), which has Mike greatly concerned, especially when he finds out that Wanda is friends with Vanessa. Mandy asks her parents for $2000 to go on holiday to Cancun, but they refuse and persuade her to take a waitress job at the diner where Kristin works, which does not please Kristin.
29	5	"Mother Fracker"	John Pasquin	Ed Yeager	November 30, 2012	2ATP06	6.72
Eve invites Vanessa to talk about her job at her class career day. After learning the gritty truth about what Vanessa really does as a geologist, Eve camps outside the house and refuses to come back inside until Vanessa quits her job. Mike, in turn, will not let Eve back in until she apologizes to her mother. With Ryan watching Boyd for a few days, Kristin and Mandy plan a "girls night out" but have different opinions on what that really means.
30	6	"Circle of Life"	John Pasquin	Vince Calandra	December 7, 2012	2ATP04	6.54
Mike and Ryan disagree on teaching Boyd about the harsh realities of life. Mandy feels responsible for Kyle possibly losing his job, as she has shoplifted numerous items at Outdoor Man under Kyle's watch. To make things right, Mandy slyly returns many of the stolen items and then helps teach Kyle how to spot and catch shoplifters.
31	7	"Putting a Hit on Christmas"	John Pasquin	Mike Teverbaugh	December 14, 2012	2ATP08	6.81
When Ryan suggests taking Boyd to Canada for Christmas, and Mandy and Eve also have plans to go away, Mike and Vanessa decide that might be a chance for them to spend a quiet Christmas together, so they try to make it happen. But a favorite Christmas song of Vanessa's makes her reconsider her decision. Ed accidentally shoots a bald eagle while aiming for a wild turkey, and asks Kyle help him dispose of it. (This is the episode where Mike’s and Ed’s offices are inexplicably switched for the remainder of the series)
32	8	"Bullying"	John Pasquin	Kevin Hench	January 4, 2013	2ATP05	6.63
Eve is suspended from school for a calling a boy "gay". It turns out she said it in retaliation, after she defeated the boy in a one-on-one basketball game and he called her a name that "rhymes with bike". Kristen finds out that Ryan bought a motorcycle after getting a new job, which makes her angry due to the fact Ryan has rarely given her money for child support.
33	9	"Attractive Architect"	John Pasquin	Mike Teverbaugh	January 11, 2013	2ATP12	6.89
Bill McKendree (Richard Karn), an architect who has worked with Mike and Outdoor Man for years, is bidding on the construction of a new Outdoor Man mall store. Bill and Mike assume the bid is a formality, but Ed favors the plans from an attractive young female architect, Alyssa (Jackie Seiden), although Mike thinks that Ed only wants to hire Alyssa based on her looks. Vanessa convinces Mike to view the plans "blindly". After a work colleague dies, Vanessa gets that person's position over an equally qualified but "plain" looking woman, and she questions whether she got the job based on her looks. After Mandy insults Eve, Eve hides all the makeup in the house, so Mandy has to go to school without any. Notes: 1) There is a reference to Tim Allen's previous Home Improvement, in which Richard Karn co-starred, when Bill tells Mike to say "Hi" to his three boys. After Mike reminds Bill that he has three girls, Bill remarks "Really? I seem to remember it was three boys." 2) From this episode on, without any explanation or comment, Mike and Ed's offices have been swapped, including Ed's fireplace.
34	10	"The Help"	John Pasquin	Ed Yeager	January 18, 2013	2ATP13	6.62
Mike and Vanessa hire a new housekeeper, Blanca (Carla Jimenez), but her presence has Eve, Mandy and Boyd becoming a lot more lazy. Mike and Ed check on the loading dock workers of Outdoor Man, to see if they are legally allowed to work there.
35	11	"Mike's Pole"	John Pasquin	Vince Calandra	February 1, 2013	2ATP11	6.92
Eve joins the Junior Reserve Officers' Training Corps and becomes enthusiastically patriotic, so Mike feels obliged to get up with her before dawn every day to put up their new American flag on a flag pole in the Baxter front yard. Vanessa is concerned over Eve's newfound military interest, anxious that she might go on to join the actual military, but even a visit to the local veterans center and an encounter with a wounded female veteran (Katy Sullivan) does not lessen her zeal. Mike is upset after learning that Ryan refuses to have Boyd learn or recite the Pledge of Allegiance at his school.
36	12	"Quarterback Boyfriend"	John Pasquin	Sid Youngers	February 8, 2013	2ATP09	7.29
Mike gets Greg Archer (Bryce Durfee), the local high school's star quarterback, a job at Outdoor Man. Mike later learns that Greg is a prima donna and refuses to do any work at the store, leaving Kyle to do all the work by himself. Knowing of Mandy's romantic interest in Greg, Mike tries to warn her about him, but Vanessa insists that Mandy should find out for herself, which she does when Greg fails to appear for their date. Mike teaches Eve about hunting gophers and rabbits. Ryan asks Kristin if she still has feelings for Kyle.
37	13	"What's in a Name?"	John Pasquin	Kevin Hench	February 15, 2013	2ATP14	6.74
Mike is upset when he finds out that Boyd is using Ryan's last name, Vogelson, instead of Baxter. Mike and Ryan then compete by each crafting a car for the annual father-son pinewood derby race, but, even though Mike's car wins their head-to-head, he goes along with Boyd choosing to enter with the one he made with Ryan. The Inglorious Baxters (last seen in "Guess Who's Coming to Dinner") film a new music video to be put online for Valentine's Day.
38	14	"Buffalo Bill Day"	John Pasquin	Julie Larson	February 22, 2013	2ATP10	6.04
Mike directs a small skit at the Outdoor Man store to celebrate the birthday of Buffalo Bill. However, Boyd being involved angers Ryan as he feels the script contains material that is offensive to Native Americans. Ryan was already annoyed because Mike took Boyd out on one of Ryan's days for having Boyd, so he produces legal papers for Kristin to sign to define his visitation rights. Mandy making romantic moves on Kyle upsets Eve because Kyle and Kristin previously dated.
39	15	"Breaking Curfew"	John Pasquin	Vince Calandra	March 1, 2013	2ATP15	7.05
Mandy sneaks into the house past her curfew but is seen by Mike and Vanessa; when Mike questions Mandy and Kyle, they both deny having been together late into the night. Kristin sneaks out of the house because she is reluctant to tell Mike and Boyd that she and Ryan are now dating.
40	16	"Private Coach"	John Pasquin	Ed Yeager	March 8, 2013	2ATP16	6.96
The women fawn over Octavio (Ezequiel Stremiz), Eve's new assistant soccer coach, whom Mike hires to give Eve private lessons. However, Mike and Octavio soon disagree on how to coach Eve. Mandy is bothered by Kyle not getting jealous when he catches her staring at Octavio. In the ensuing argument, Kyle mistakenly calls her "Kristin".
41	17	"The Fight"	John Pasquin	Michael Shipley	March 15, 2013	2ATP17	6.43
Ryan punches a drunk Bill McKendree, after he pesters Boyd at a baseball game. This especially bothers Ryan, due to his pacifist beliefs. Mike and Vanessa take away Mandy's cell phone and laptop, until she gets her history grade up. Mandy then discovers that she can "chat" using Mike's ham radio in the basement.
42	18	"College Girl"	John Pasquin	Sarah Jane Cunningham & Suzie V. Freeman	March 22, 2013	2ATP18	7.85
Kristin is shocked to hear that Mandy has been accepted into not one, but two colleges, causing her to re-evaluate where she is in her own life. This is further reinforced when Kristin runs into a previous co-worker from the diner named John Baker (Jonathan Taylor Thomas) who now owns a hip new restaurant. Eve gets help preparing for her Junior ROTC drills from neighbor and former Marine, Chuck Larabee. Meanwhile, Mandy's choice of an expensive college in Laguna Beach, California does not sit well with Mike and Vanessa, and Mike lets out a secret to Mandy that Ed pulled some strings to get her accepted there. Kristin gets a better paying job which enables her and Boyd to move out of her parents home and into a new apartment. Ryan accepts Kristen’s offer to live with them. Note: Tim Allen and Jonathan Taylor Thomas worked together as father and son on the 1990s sitcom, Home Improvement. This makes Thomas the second Home Improvement regular (after Richard Karn) to appear on Last Man Standing.

=== Season 3 (2013–14) ===
On May 10, 2013, the series was renewed for a third season, it premiered on September 20, 2013. Beginning this season, at the start of each episode a different cast member narrates that the series is recorded in front of a live studio audience. Duck Dynasty stars Willie Robertson and Si Robertson guest starred in the season premiere, "Back to School". Jonathan Taylor Thomas reprised his role as John Baker in the episodes "Ryan v. John Baker" and "Tasers". Thomas also made his directorial debut, directing the episode "Haunted House"; it was the first episode of series not directed by John Pasquin. Petty Officer First Class Raymond McKnight guest starred in the episode "Elfie".

Season 3 episodes
No. overall	No. in season	Title	Directed by	Written by	Original release date	Prod. code	U.S. viewers (millions)
43	1	"Back to School"	John Pasquin	Kevin Hench	September 20, 2013	3ATP01	6.67
Mike disagrees with Kristin and Ryan about Boyd attending the bilingual elementary school in their neighborhood. Mike offers to have Boyd co-located at the Baxter home so that he can qualify to attend their local school with smaller class sizes. An ulterior motive is also revealed: Mike misses having Boyd around. Mandy starts a college philosophy course, which starts to affect Kyle's outlook on life, but Willie Robertson talks some sense back into Kyle.
44	2	"Driving Lessons"	John Pasquin	Mike Teverbaugh	September 27, 2013	3ATP02	5.73
Mike arranges for Vanessa to give Eve driving lessons, feeling that they do not spend enough time together. Mandy dislikes the fact that Mike makes Kyle do household chores whenever he arrives at the house to spend time with her.
45	3	"Pledging"	John Pasquin	Michael Shipley	October 4, 2013	3ATP03	6.22
Vanessa encourages Mandy to join the sorority at her college, but Mandy's time commitment to the sorority gives her an excuse to skip her classes. Vanessa tells Mandy it may be time to move on from Kyle in order to get the "full" college experience. Inspired by an Undercover Boss-type show, Ed goes undercover at the Outdoor Man loading dock to investigate why the area's performance has not been up to par.
46	4	"Ryan v. John Baker"	John Pasquin	Ed Yeager	October 11, 2013	3ATP04	6.03
Ryan and his fellow beer truck drivers are on strike. Frustrated over the negotiations, he expresses some anti-management comments in front of Kristin's boss, John. Kristin is annoyed and embarrassed, and later almost kisses John when they are alone. Next day, Ryan says that their pay demands have been met but not some others, so he broke off the talks. Kristin is furious and tells him not to come home, and he sleeps on Mike and Vanessa's couch. Ryan accepts Mike's offer of a night janitor job at Outdoor Man to help Kristin make ends meet. Meanwhile, Mike tries to teach Eve how to be stealthy.
47	5	"Haunted House"	Jonathan Taylor Thomas	Amy Mass	October 18, 2013	3ATP05	6.19
Vanessa takes over the PTA haunted house responsibility from Kristin for Boyd's school Halloween party. Vanessa's designs end up scaring Boyd, and she considers a less scary plan until Mike steps in and says Boyd needs to learn how to face his fears. Meanwhile, Mandy and Eve's constant exchange of insults winds up hurting both of their feelings.
48	6	"Larabee for School Board"	John Pasquin	Vince Calandra	November 1, 2013	3ATP06	6.36
Carol Larabee runs for the school board and asks Vanessa to put her campaign sign on their front lawn. Mike is reluctant to do so, and becomes a suspect when the sign keeps getting stolen. Ultimately, Mike is supportive when he learns that Carol's ideas on cost-cutting mirror his own, while Vanessa withdraws her support after Carol says she would cut an after school art program. Kyle becomes jealous when Ed takes Ryan out for lunch. Eve gets dating advice from Mandy and Kristin, and says she likes Kristin's idea even though it is essentially the same advice Mandy gave her moments before. When the boy she likes shuns her, Eve ultimately goes to Mandy for advice on how to win the boy back.
49	7	"Shoveling Snow"	John Pasquin	Mike Haukom	November 8, 2013	3ATP07	6.22
Eve's neighborhood snow shoveling business is threatened by Phil Munroe (Larry Joe Campbell), one of the Baxter's neighbors, who starts his own business using a snow blower. Mike's market-driven advice to Eve conflicts with Vanessa, who feels sorry for Phil after learning that he recently lost his accounting job. Meanwhile, Mandy pretends to be single so she can earn bigger tips at the diner, and asks Kyle to stop showing her affection when he comes in.
50	8	"Vanessa Fixes Kyle"	John Pasquin	Kevin Abbott	November 15, 2013	3ATP09	6.15
After previously suggesting that Mandy break up with Kyle to date college guys, Vanessa tries make amends with Kyle by building his self-esteem and tricking Ed into giving him a job as a boat salesman at Outdoor Man. Although Kyle turns out to be a successful salesman, he does not enjoy it, but Ed and Mike discover another role for him. Meanwhile, Eve is stuck babysitting Boyd, much to her dislike.
51	9	"Thanksgiving"	Ted Wass	Vince Calandra	November 22, 2013	3ATP08	6.21
Mike's father Bud visits for Thanksgiving, and announces that his other son, Jim, has kicked him out of his own construction business. He now plans to open up a marijuana store (now that it is about to be legalized in Colorado), and says he wants Mike's marketing expertise, but Mike is reluctant because of the message it sends to their children. Meanwhile, Boyd is doing a school project that has him videotaping his aunts and grandparents on why they are thankful, but the results are not what Kristin wants Boyd's teacher to see. Ryan is eagerly watching the Thanksgiving football game because he has bet on the Detroit Lions with a co-worker, despite knowing nothing about football. Eve is not thankful to have to share a small table with Boyd. Mandy is unhappy that Kyle may not be able to make it to the Baxters for dinner.
52	10	"Spanking"	John Pasquin	Miriam Tragdon & Gracie Charters	December 6, 2013	3ATP10	6.27
Conflict flairs when Bud says that, while babysitting, he spanked Boyd once after he refused to take his used plate to the kitchen. A day later, Kristin spanks Boyd and blames it on Vanessa for having spanked her a few times during childhood. Bud later Mike convinces Kristin that Ryan's method of bribing Boyd with ice cream is not the way to go. Meanwhile, Mandy buys Kyle a hat that he does not really want to wear, and Ed and Mike convince him that the hat is Mandy's way of "marking her property", so he responds in kind.
53	11	"Elfie"	Ted Wass	Story by : Maisie Culver; Teleplay by : Bryan Larrivee & D.J. Ryan	December 13, 2013	3ATP11	6.27
Conflict arises over the way Boyd should be celebrating Christmas; Mike and Vanessa want to continue their traditions featuring Jesus, Santa Claus, and Santa's helper, "Elfie", while atheist Ryan wants to celebrate every seasonal tradition from around the world except Christmas. Meanwhile, Mandy wants only money for Christmas, so that she can spend it on what she wants without the hassle of returning gifts for cash. Her attitude changes when she meets Blanca's niece, whose father is a soldier stationed in Afghanistan. Mandy then surprises everyone by using the money to bring the girl's father home.
54	12	"All About Eve"	John Pasquin	Kevin Hench	January 10, 2014	3ATP12	7.18
When Eve shares some of Mike's conservative vlogs on her social media page, she becomes a target of ridicule and hate from her overwhelmingly liberal classmates. Meanwhile, a police officer who has set up speed traps in the neighborhood is making life miserable for several of the Baxters, except Mandy, whom he lets off with a warning due to her flirting with him.
55	13	"Breaking Boyd"	John Pasquin	Lisa K. Nelson	January 17, 2014	3ATP13	6.22
After several incidents of misbehavior at school, Boyd is sent to a therapist who prescribes medication for ADHD. Mike, Vanessa and Ryan all convince Kristin that Boyd is too young for the medication, and they try alternate methods. Mike builds a hockey rink in the backyard, and his method of having Boyd burn off excess energy seems to work. Meanwhile, Mandy secretly takes Boyd's pills and passes all of her final exams, causing Mike and Vanessa to wonder if she might actually have ADHD.
56	14	"Renaming Boyd's School"	John Pasquin	Jonathan Haller	January 24, 2014	3ATP14	6.34
Boyd's school, William Clark Elementary (named after the explorer), may have its name changed, after Boyd, with Ryan's help, writes a report revealing that Clark owned slaves. Vanessa and Mike both want the name to remain, although for different reasons. To Vanessa's surprise, school board member Carol Larabee supports keeping the name because of the cost of changing the sign and painting over a Lewis & Clark mural (which was Vanessa's project when she was PTA president). Mandy pays Blanca to tutor her in using a sewing machine to make her first dress for her fashion design class assignment.
57	15	"Tasers"	John Pasquin	Sid Youngers	January 31, 2014	3ATP15	6.92
Mike gives Vanessa a taser for Valentine's Day, as it is a holiday that he does not really believe in, but he secretly sends her a large bouquet of roses, too. When the roses show up at the Baxter home with no card, however, Kristin thinks they are from her boss John, which creates an awkward moment at work. Eve has three boys at school that like her compete for the position of "Eve's Boyfriend". She eventually falls for Justin (Tye Sheridan), the one guy who will not play along, much to the chagrin of Andrew (Zachary Gordon), who worships her. Elsewhere, Kyle carves a bar of soap into Mandy's favorite bird for a Valentine's Day gift.
58	16	"Stud Muffin"	Ted Wass	Tim Doyle	February 28, 2014	3ATP16	6.37
Muffin, the Baxters' dog, appears to have knocked up the Larabees' prized German shepherd, Lady. When Mike goes to the Larabee home to tell Chuck that he plans to take care of any financial obligations, he learns from Carol that Chuck moved out a week ago. This upsets Vanessa, who just talked to Carol the day before and heard nothing about it. Meanwhile, Mandy dents a parked car while driving with Eve and does not leave a note for the car's owner, so Eve leaves one for her. Eve then learns that the vehicle's owner, Jerry (Maz Jobrani), who runs an electronics store, was so impressed with Mandy's apparent honesty that he rewarded her with an iPad.
59	17	"Eve's Boyfriend"	John Pasquin	Mike Haukom	March 7, 2014	3ATP18	6.38
Eve confides to Vanessa that her boyfriend Justin is very religious and has taken a purity pledge. Vanessa leaks the info to Mike, which annoys Eve while making Mike surprisingly more suspicious of Justin. Eve then tells her sisters that Justin will be with her on a weekend away at Junior ROTC camp, and Kristin feels it is her duty to tell their parents. Mike and Vanessa then tell Eve she must stay home, but she sneaks out of the house. It turns out they've all misinterpreted Eve's intentions – she does not even want Justin at camp because he was a last-minute replacement and will drag her team down in the competitions.
60	18	"Project Mandy"	John Pasquin	Mike Haukom	March 28, 2014	3ATP17	6.47
After displaying her designs at a class fashion show, Mandy decides to drop out of college to pursue her dreams. Mike and Vanessa are strongly against the idea, then run afoul of Bud after he gives Mandy $5,000 in seed money. When Mike sees that Mandy has over 80 online orders already and is actually running her start-up smartly, buying close-outs from discount stores for material, he changes his tune. For her part, Mandy decides to stay in school and take some "marketing and businessing" classes.
61	19	"Hard-Ass Teacher"	Jonathan Taylor Thomas	Mike Teverbaugh	April 4, 2014	3ATP19	6.30
Eve reveals she will be pursuing acceptance into West Point Academy, and is worried about her poor grade in Geometry. She asks Vanessa to sign a schedule change form so she can get out of the class taught by the notoriously tough Mr. Hardin (Michael Gross) and into an easier one, but Mike thinks she should learn to face difficult situations head-on. At Outdoor Man, Wendi Gracin (Joely Fisher), a smothering mother, convinces Ed to give her slacker son a summer job at the store. Wendi and Ed then begin dating.
62	20	"Parenting Bud"	John Pasquin	Vince Calandra	April 11, 2014	3ATP20	5.90
After Bud gets mugged and the attacker takes a stash of the store's pot, Mike wants to get his father a handgun. But Bud is strictly against it, so Mike finds another way to help through a new business that Chuck Larabee has started. Mike feels left out when Chuck, Ed and Bud swap stories about their war injuries. When the Baxter girls tell Vanessa they think she always lets Mike get his way, she decides to take a stand.
63	21	"April, Come She Will"	John Pasquin	Kevin Hench	April 18, 2014	3ATP21	5.39
April, Vanessa's flighty sister returns, this time saying she wants to have a child but is no longer fertile. She asks Mike and Vanessa for $6,000 to purchase a donor egg, but after some deliberation, Vanessa declines. Mandy then offers to donate one of her eggs, which upsets her parents, but later finds out that April is not in a hurry to proceed. Meanwhile, Mike has Kyle follow Chuck Larabee around the Outdoor Man store as a "prank profiling", but later Chuck gets him back.
64	22	"Mutton Busting"	Tim Doyle	Michael Shipley	April 25, 2014	3ATP22	6.10
Mike wants Boyd to participate in the Outdoor Man-sponsored mutton busting competition to build his confidence. Ryan eventually agrees but runs into trouble trying to convince Kristin. Meanwhile, Eve's boyfriend Justin does not want her to wear her JROTC uniform to the prom, and his insistence on her wearing a dress leads to a fight, so Eve ends up going to prom with Andrew instead. Kristin and Ryan tell Vanessa and Mike they are engaged.

=== Season 4 (2014–15) ===
On May 10, 2014, ABC renewed Last Man Standing for a fourth season, which premiered on October 3, 2014. Both Jordan Masterson and Jonathan Adams were promoted to the main cast this season. Patricia Richardson, Tim Allen's former Home Improvement co-star, guest starred in the episode "Helen Potts", playing the episode's titular character. Richardson is the third Home Improvement cast member to guest star on Last Man Standing after both Richard Karn and Jonathan Taylor Thomas guest starred previously. Thomas also made a cameo appearance at the end of the "Helen Potts" episode, not as John Baker (the character he previously played on Last Man Standing), but as Helen's son Randy, a reference to his character from Home Improvement. On April 3, 2015, Allen and Héctor Elizondo guest starred on the fellow ABC sitcom Cristela as their Last Man Standing characters in the episode "Last Goose Standing", which aired after "Restaurant Opening".

Season 4 episodes
No. overall	No. in season	Title	Directed by	Written by	Original release date	Prod. code	U.S. viewers (millions)
65	1	"Here's the Kicker"	John Pasquin	Michael Shipley	October 3, 2014	4ATP01	6.91
After kicking a field goal during a halftime promotion that wins her a new Camaro, Eve is asked to be the new placekicker for her high school football team. This creates a rift between Mike, who is eager for Eve to join the team, and Vanessa, who fears that Eve will get hurt. It also complicates the relationship between Eve and her boyfriend Justin, a benchwarmer on the team, after Eve becomes the hero in the next game by kicking the winning field goal.
66	2	"War Games"	Victor Gonzalez	Kevin Hench	October 3, 2014	4ATP02	6.91
Boyd gets in trouble at a friend's house for using "finger guns", which both Mike and Kristin find ridiculous while Ryan supports the friend's mother. Ryan gets further upset that Mike has taught Boyd to shoot guns and sometimes lets him watch violent movies. Things come to a head when Mike lets Boyd leave a kiddie carnival at Outdoor Man to play "splatball", and Ryan learns that Kristin keeps a gun in their apartment. Meanwhile, Mandy agrees to make a little black dress for Vanessa who wants to make a good impression when meeting up with her college classmates.
67	3	"Rediscover America"	Victor Gonzalez	Vince Calandra	October 10, 2014	4ATP03	6.62
Wendi convinces Ed that Mike is getting too much credit for the success of Outdoor Man, after Mike appears on the cover of Denver Business Weekly. So Ed nixes Mike's idea for a Columbus Day boat sale, and also cancels his related vlog. Mike does the vlog anyway, but has a surprise in store for Ed. Elsewhere, the Baxter girls tell Eve she is representing all women in school sports after her name appears in the local paper, causing a nervous Eve to miss a crucial field goal in her team's next game.
68	4	"Sinkhole"	Joel Murray	Vince Calandra	October 17, 2014	4ATP05	6.79
While Mike is driving Boyd in the truck, he just prevents it falling into a massive sinkhole in the road, leading to Boyd being afraid to leave the house. When Ryan blames the fracking that Vanessa's company is doing for a large increase in sinkholes, and he disagrees with Mike's assurances to Boyd that God protects them, that only scares Boyd even more.
69	5	"School Merger"	John Pasquin	Mike Teverbaugh	October 24, 2014	4ATP06	6.18
The Larabees visit the Baxter home, and Carol mentions a local election ballot proposal to close Taft High—a failing school—and move the pupils to better-performing schools. She approves, but is concerned that programs like art and music may be cut as a consequence. Since extra funding to prevent that would mean a rise in property taxes, Mike and Chuck are against the proposal, but Eve favors it, because she is worried that her low grade in art will hurt her chances to get into West Point. Meanwhile, Vanessa has become dissatisfied with her job and is thinking of leaving it. Her idea is reinforced when Ryan dresses up Boyd for Halloween as "the scariest thing on earth": a lump of coal. When the school proposal fails to pass, Vanessa announces that she wants to take up teaching science at Taft. This amuses Chuck because Mike is not happy about it, until Carol reveals she has decided to relinquish her school board position and go back to teaching at Taft.
70	6	"Mike Advises Mandy"	John Pasquin	Ed Yeager	October 31, 2014	4ATP04	6.71
Mike finds out that Mandy has not paid taxes on her business, so he advises her on how to use re-branding to boost the profits from her website, but Mandy thinks she has a better idea. Vanessa grows concerned upon learning that Bud is going to Reno for a weekend with a married woman, but Mike is more concerned that Bud asked Kristin to look after the pot store while he's away. Meanwhile, Ed has been talked into buying a thousand six-man tents for Outdoor Man, but they are not selling, so he takes to the shop floor himself to move them.
71	7	"Big Shots"	John Pasquin	Joey Gutierrez	November 7, 2014	4ATP07	6.67
Mike gets caught between Kristin and Ryan when Boyd gets chicken pox and Kristin reveals he was never vaccinated. After reading up, Ryan considers getting Boyd vaccinated behind Kristin's back. Elsewhere, Eve beats Kyle in a shooting-gallery game, knocking off his previously highest score, but he tells Mandy that he let Eve win because she is such a bad loser; Eve's obnoxious boasting pushes Mandy to tell her what Kyle said, so Eve demands a rematch.
72	8	"Risky Behavior"	John Pasquin	Mike Haukom	November 14, 2014	4ATP08	7.07
After Kyle takes a spill off his motorbike, Mandy is so concerned she tries to convince him to sell the bike, while Ed becomes worried about Outdoor Man's employee healthcare insurance. Meanwhile, Eve gets frustrated with her football coach's play-calling and decides on her own to run a fake field goal; while the play results in a touchdown, the coach benches Eve for the next game.
73	9	"Changing Light Bulbs"	Ted Wass	Lisa K. Nelson	November 21, 2014	4ATP09	7.10
After Mike's last 75-watt incandescent light bulb burns out, he and Chuck go on a mission to find some more on the black market. Meanwhile, Mandy announces that she will be moving out of the house and into her own apartment. However, she does not tell her parents that Kyle will be moving in with her.
74	10	"Outdoor Man Grill"	Ted Wass	Tim Doyle	December 5, 2014	4ATP10	6.66
Mike wants to go forward with an idea to start a wild game restaurant under the Outdoor Man name. He asks Kristin if she would leave her job and manage the new endeavor, but she says that working with her father might ruin their relationship. In reality, she is afraid to take the risk, feeling that Ryan's job does not provide enough of a safety net. Meanwhile, when Mandy finds a new best-seller with hats made from pheasant feathers from the results of Eve's hunting trip, Eve agrees to take her hunting to get more.
75	11	"Wedding Planning"	Robbie Countryman	Matt Berry	December 12, 2014	4ATP11	5.99
As the family makes preparation for Christmas, Mike and Vanessa give Kristin and Ryan a $20,000 check for their wedding. While the parents think it is understood that the ceremony will be in the Baxter family's church followed by a big reception, Ryan and Kristin announce that they've planned a small ceremony in the park with a Native American official. Kristin says they would rather use the money to pay down Ryan's student loan debt. Surprisingly, it is Vanessa, not Mike, who then wants to retract the check. Vanessa puts her foot down on Ryan's selfish behavior and refuses to give them the money. However, after much convincing, Kristin and Ryan agree to have the wedding at the church. Elsewhere, Kyle wants to join Ed's weekly poker game, and tries to get Ed to teach him how to play.
76	12	"Helen Potts"	John Pasquin	Amy Mass	January 9, 2015	4ATP13	8.60
When Mike complains about Chuck's dog barking in the wee hours of the morning, Chuck blames it on his neighbor Helen Potts (Patricia Richardson) running her tile saw. Mike confronts Helen, and finds that she has numerous household projects going since her husband left. In a nod to Tim Taylor (Tim Allen's character on Home Improvement who played opposite Richardson's Jill Taylor), she explains that her ex's home improvements were frequently disasters. Mike's annoyance with Helen worsens when she and Vanessa become friends. Elsewhere, Eve wants to interview Ed for a school project on the Vietnam War, but is disappointed when she learns that Ed was in the clerical pool and did not see combat. She changes her tune when she sees that Ed is still helping veterans to this day.
77	13	"Mike Hires Chuck"	John Pasquin	Mike Haukom	January 16, 2015	4ATP12	6.88
After an Outdoor Man billboard touting Ed's recent humanitarian award is vandalized, Mike wants to hire Chuck's security company to protect it. Vanessa does not want Mike to mix business with friendship - she's counting on a teaching recommendation from Carol. But Chuck persuades Ed to hire him. Meanwhile, Mandy is studying the works of Maimonides for a philosophy class and is inspired to do extra chores around the house, but anonymously. However, her principles are tested when Vanessa assumes Eve did the chores and makes a big show of praising her. Eve does not correct her, preferring to taunt Mandy, but things backfire on Eve.
78	14	"Eve's Breakup"	John Pasquin	Michael Shipley	January 30, 2015	4ATP14	7.51
Eve announces she's broken up with Justin. Vanessa worries Eve may be devastated, but Eve insists it's no big deal. Ed invites Mike and Chuck over to watch the Denver Nuggets game on his massive new flat screen TV, and Mike brings Eve along. It turns out Ed has conned the gang into helping him set up the TV. While there, Eve discusses how she broke up with Justin, and the guys say it was very cold. Eve starts to wonder if she may be a cold, unfeeling person. Meanwhile, Mandy is surprised to learn Kyle continued to pursue Kristin for six months after their breakup.
79	15	"Big Brother"	John Pasquin	Lisa K. Nelson	February 6, 2015	4ATP15	7.23
As Kyle leaves for a bachelor party in Las Vegas, Mandy reminds him of their "agreement" that he can take the weekend off from being her boyfriend. When the neighborhood cat goes missing, Vanessa is blamed because a neighbor's security camera caught footage of her spraying it with a hose. After the Baxters' mailbox is vandalized, Mike asks Chuck to let him review some of his security footage so he can find the culprit. However, while watching the video footage, they see Mandy kissing a guy who is not Kyle.
80	16	"Three Sundays"	Victor Gonzalez	Vince Calandra	February 20, 2015	4ATP16	6.58
Kyle asks Ed if he can end their Sunday morning walk-throughs of the store as he has been missing attending church services, but Ed refuses and threatens to fire him. Mike gets to the root of Ed's stern attitude and learns that Wendi miscarried her and Ed's baby. Meanwhile, Ryan starts his own vlog on social media, including criticizing organized religion, but gets suspended at work because he does it wearing his uniform. Mike puts his personal beliefs aside and stands up for Ryan's right to free speech.
81	17	"Kyle's Friend"	Victor Gonzalez	Joey Gutierrez	February 27, 2015	4ATP17	7.35
A homeless man named Dave who used to sleep on the Outdoor Man loading dock has gone missing, and Kyle, who had befriended the man, worries about him. When Dave reappears, Kyle offers him a place to stay, but Dave takes advantage of his kindness. Meanwhile, Mandy wants her parents to give her a big party and a car for her 21st birthday. But when she accompanies Kyle to a homeless shelter looking for Dave, Mandy meets a young mother who changes her perspective.
82	18	"Mandy's Party"	Victor Gonzalez	Matt Berry	March 13, 2015	4ATP18	6.94
Ed has given Mike and Vanessa a weekend getaway with a suite at a luxury hotel in Vail for their anniversary and they leave Mandy in charge of the house. When they return early because the highways are closed due to a snowstorm, they discover evidence of a party at the house with alcohol and underage guests, they assume it was Mandy's party and she does take responsibility for it. But later they find out it was actually Eve's party. Eve is puzzled why Mandy took the blame. While reviewing plans for the Outdoor Man Grill with Ed, Kristin begins to get nervous about her upcoming wedding after Ed tells her about his four failed marriages.
83	19	"Summer Internship"	Victor Gonzalez	Maisie Culver	March 20, 2015	4ATP19	6.97
Mandy is ecstatic when she lands her dream summer internship at DKNY in New York City, only to sadly announce later that due to her GPA dropping down, she lost it. However, even after Mike helps her get another internship in New York, she tells her parents she will not take it. Mike and Vanessa later discover that Mandy did not lose the first internship but she does not want to go to New York because Kyle wanted to go with her.
84	20	"Restaurant Opening"	Victor Gonzalez	Gracie Charters	April 3, 2015	4ATP20	6.56
The Outdoor Man Grill is opened and is a great success, but things get heated when Ed keeps overruling Kristin's management decisions and she tells him to stop interfering. Meanwhile, after Mandy suggests to Eve that her best friend Cammy has a crush on her that is "more than friendly", Eve becomes uncomfortable and tries to distance herself from Cammy, but then regrets it, so Mandy gives her some big-sisterly advice.
85	21	"Vanessa Fixes Up Eve"	Tim Doyle	Ed Yeager	April 10, 2015	4ATP21	6.44
Vanessa embarrasses Mandy when she starts hanging out with her and her friends at college, and then sets up Eve with Logan, a 16-year-old science prodigy in one of her college classes. While this is going on, the Larabees suspect that their son Brandon is secretly dating Eve, which mortifies Vanessa when they tell her after she had set up Eve with Logan.
86	22	"Daddy Dearest"	Robbie Countryman	Mike Teverbaugh	April 17, 2015	4ATP22	6.16
Ryan's father Victor (Jere Burns) comes to visit before the wedding and Ryan reveals to the Baxters that his father is terminally ill. However, Victor later tells Mike that he was misdiagnosed and he has not revealed the truth because Ryan finally wants to spend time with him. This secret provides the background for Mike, Ed, Ryan and Victor’s hunting trip to Ed’s cabin. Meanwhile, with most of the Baxters' relatives declining to attend the wedding, Vanessa is desperate to fill their side of the church.

=== Season 5 (2015–16) ===
On May 10, 2015, Last Man Standing was renewed for a fifth season. At the start of this season, the practice of a cast member narrating at the start of each episode that "Last Man Standing is recorded in front of a live studio audience" is discontinued. Jay Leno guest starred as Joe Leonard, a mechanic in the episodes "The Road Less Driven", "Mike and the Mechanics" and the season finale "The Shortcut". Patricia Richardson reprised her role as Helen Potts in the episode "Tanks for the Memories". Bill Engvall guest starred in the episode "The Marriage Doctor", reuniting with his Bill Engvall Show co-star Nancy Travis.

Season 5 episodes
No. overall	No. in season	Title	Directed by	Written by	Original release date	Prod. code	U.S. viewers (millions)
87	1	"The Wolf Returns"	John Pasquin	Michael Shipley	September 25, 2015	5ATP01	6.27
Mike returns from a two month trip to far-flung places for Outdoor Man, and finds that Vanessa has redecorated their bedroom, while Mandy and Eve are fighting even more than usual since Mandy’s return from New York City, so he considers going on the road more, hurting Vanessa's feelings. Kristin keeps putting off her honeymoon with Ryan because she finds her job so fulfilling. Meanwhile, Ed is heartbroken after Wendi left him for spending too much time at work, and now thinks Outdoor Man is all he has, so he stays at the store with a tornado headed toward Denver, and Kyle feels he has to stay too, jeopardizing their safety. The tornado makes everyone reconsider what is important and Mandy reveals she has been lying about how great things went during her internship in NYC.
88	2	"Free Range Parents"	Victor Gonzalez	Ed Yeager	October 2, 2015	5ATP02	6.55
Mike tries to convince Ryan to allow Boyd to walk six blocks to the Baxters' home to help him feel more independent. Ryan reluctantly agrees, but later he is caught hiding in the bushes near the school and having a GPS device in Boyd's jacket. Vanessa is excited to go see the new Ryan Gosling movie with Mandy and Eve, but both of them already saw the movie and try to keep it a secret from her. At Outdoor Man, Ed decides to discontinue the kids section and use the area to market products to "Doomsday Preppers", which brings about a conversation about secret hideaway shelters and other hysterical scenarios.
89	3	"Ping-pong"	Victor Gonzalez	Kevin Hench	October 9, 2015	5ATP04	6.35
Worried that Mike will lose contact with Mandy after she moves out, Vanessa encourages him to find something they have in common. Mike is initially skeptical, but reconsiders when Ed tells him about his long-estranged daughter, Maria. After some failed attempts, Mike and Mandy revive their old tradition of Saturday ping-pong games. Vanessa tries to convince Eve to support Hillary Clinton so there may be a female president, but Eve doesn't want to support a candidate whose policies she does not agree with just because she is a woman.
90	4	"Educating Boyd"	Victor Gonzalez	Mike Haukom	October 16, 2015	5ATP05	6.58
After Boyd gets suspended from school, Mike suggests Ryan consider sending Boyd to a private school and offers to pay. But Ryan decides to homeschool Boyd himself, despite Vanessa, frustrated by teaching in an inner city school, offering to do it. Kyle and Kristen try to capture a raccoon that is loose at the Outdoor Man Grill. Eve takes pictures of Mandy working at her sewing machine for a class project, but Mandy does not want anyone to see "Basement Mandy", without makeup and not dressed up.
91	5	"The Road Less Driven"	John Pasquin	Jon Haller	October 23, 2015	5ATP06	7.16
On Mike's birthday, Vanessa gives him a 1967 Impala, but Mike gets annoyed when the previous owner, Joe Leonard (Jay Leno), constantly visits to work on it with him. Mike decides Joe is lying about having a highly desirable original transmission for the Impala in order to spend time with "the Outdoor Man", so Mike asks Chuck and Kyle to help him look for it at Joe's garage. Mandy becomes enraged when Vanessa lets Eve stay out overnight to go to a concert in Santa Fe, and she accuses Vanessa of loving Eve more than her.
92	6	"Halloween"	Victor Gonzalez	Mike Teverbaugh	October 30, 2015	5ATP03	6.94
On Halloween, Mike and Chuck decide they would rather watch college football than pass out candy to trick or treaters. Vanessa and Carol are annoyed by this and decide to play a prank on them, which leads to a prank war between the two factions. At Outdoor Man, Kyle dresses up like Ed for the holiday. Ed finds the costume flattering at first, but begins to feel insulted when Kyle's coworkers laugh at his "Ed" impersonations.
93	7	"The Dad Hat"	Victor Gonzalez	Maisie Culver	November 6, 2015	5ATP08	6.85
When the new Outdoor Man Grill in Dallas needs a consultant, Kristin volunteers for the job. However, Mike does not want her to do it, which leads to an argument over whether he is acting like her boss or her father. Mike later confides to Vanessa that he covered up for Kristin when she made numerous mistakes during the Denver restaurant opening. Meanwhile, Mandy and Kyle try to help Ed get back together with Wendi, but Ed is planning something else. While this is going on, Eve and Boyd test their fishing skills.
94	8	"The Big Sleepover"	Victor Gonzalez	Sid Youngers	November 13, 2015	5ATP09	7.47
After Eve's friend Cammy sleeps over at the Baxters' for four days, Eve reveals that Cammy's parents moved out of the country for Doctors Without Borders and she has nowhere else to stay. Although they let her stay, Mike and Vanessa get annoyed by Cammy's presence and try to find somewhere else for her to go, namely the Larabees', after they learn that Carol actually likes Cammy. Meanwhile, Kristin has designers submit designs for new Outdoor Man Grill waitress uniforms and asks Mandy to take part. Later, the sisters argue when Mandy gives Kristin only one design, instead of the three she asked for, and Kristin refuses to give Mandy the job because she didn't meet the requirements. When Ed sees all the new designs, he chooses Mandy’s design as the winner, much to Kristin’s chagrin.
95	9	"The Gratitude List"	John Pasquin	Richard Brandon Manus	November 20, 2015	5ATP07	7.29
With Kristin working at the Outdoor Man Grill and Mandy spending the holiday with Kyle and his grandmother, Mike, Vanessa, and Eve will be the only ones in attendance at Thanksgiving dinner. Vanessa is determined to make it great since it will be the last one before Eve goes to college, but Eve disappoints her when she asks not to do their "goofy" tradition of writing the things they are thankful for on "The Gratitude List". Eve later apologizes to her mother, but Vanessa just gets more angry when she finds out Eve only apologized because Mike told her to do so. Meanwhile, Kristin finds out Mandy lied to their parents and Mandy and Kyle are actually eating dinner by themselves.
96	10	"The Puck Stops Here"	Victor Gonzalez	Kevin Hench	December 4, 2015	5ATP10	6.67
Mike persuades Ryan to take over coaching Boyd's hockey team when the previous coach gets arrested for tax evasion, but Ryan quits when Kristin doesn't like his winning style of coaching. Chuck takes over with a softer coaching style, but Boyd prefers winning with Ryan even though he shouts at them, so Mike has to convince Ryan over again. Vanessa is happy to agree to tutor Eve in chemistry, but wonders why she is struggling, and it takes Mandy to quickly realize that it is because Eve has a crush on her lab partner.
97	11	"Gift of the Wise Man"	Robbie Countryman	Kevin Abbott	December 11, 2015	5ATP11	6.84
Mike decides to have the family help out with some tasks that an exhausted Vanessa is struggling to complete by Christmas because she's too busy with work. This backfires when Eve and Mandy make up stories about the family for their Christmas newsletter, while Ryan, and a compliant Kyle, create a “Your God Here” for their church’s Nativity scene. Meanwhile, Ed decides to retire from being Santa at Outdoor Man and he picks Chuck to take over the role, much to Kyle's dismay.
98	12	"Polar Run"	Victor Gonzalez	Joey Gutierrez	January 8, 2016	5ATP12	7.33
When Mike and Vanessa make a bet on their annual Michigan-Ohio State alumni Polar Run, they both try to get Eve to join their teams. Mandy takes advantage by stepping in as Eve's agent to negotiate the best rewards, for both Eve and herself. Against Kristin's wishes, Ed hires Wendi to be the new hostess at The Outdoor Man Grill, but Wendi spends most of the time with Ed instead of working, much to the annoyance of Kristin and, it turns out, to Ed. On the day of the race, Eve tells her parents she has been rejected by West Point.
99	13	"Mike and the Mechanics"	Robbie Countryman	Mike Haukom	January 15, 2016	5ATP13	6.99
Eve is still in a funk after being rejected by West Point, so Mike insists she go to Outdoor Man with him to explore other career options she might pursue. After spending the day in the service center with Joe, Eve cheers up but shocks Mike and Vanessa by declaring she will not go to college, preferring to become a mechanic instead. When Kristin and Ryan invite Mandy and Kyle over to their apartment for dinner, Ryan and Kyle bond over their mutual love of graphic novels, but Kristin gets upset when Mandy has no interest in their spending time together.
100	14	"The Ring"	Victor Gonzalez	Ed Yeager	January 29, 2016	5ATP14	6.87
Ed plans to propose to Wendi and he asks Kyle to take the engagement ring to get it resized, telling him to keep it all a secret from Mike who does not like Wendi. But Mike sees Kyle holding the ring and thinks Kyle is going to propose to Mandy. He tells Vanessa, who then tells Mandy, leading her to go out to a planned dinner with Kyle with high expectations. After Ed visits to share his good news with Mike over a bottle of whisky, Mandy is phoned with the bad news. Later, Kyle reveals that he does want to marry Mandy, but first he aims to be further along in his career. With Mike's encouragement, Kyle immediately proposes and Mandy accepts.
101	15	"Home Sweet Loan"	Victor Gonzalez	Dylan Tanous	February 5, 2016	5ATP15	6.66
When Kristin and Ryan are about to renew the lease on their apartment, Mike suggests that, with Kristin now earning more, they should buy a house instead. Mike manages to help them find an ideal home at a reasonable price that Kristin loves. However, Ryan claims the house doesn't have the right "vibe" and doesn't want to buy it. Mike is certain Ryan's attitude stems from not being the family breadwinner. Meanwhile, Mandy keeps kicking Eve out of the basement so that she can have her work space to herself. After each sister tries to get Kyle to take her side, Kyle discovers that Eve has been using the basement as a place to secretly write songs and play guitar.
102	16	"Eve's Band"	Jonathan Taylor Thomas	Michael Shipley	February 19, 2016	5ATP17	6.67
Mike thinks Eve's new rock band, with Cammy doing the singing, sounds terrible. He signs them up for an open mic night, hoping the bad reception will get them to stop playing. Instead, Eve goes on by herself when the other band members chicken out and the audience loves her performance. Meanwhile, Kristin and Ryan suspect that Boyd stole from the candy store and wait for him to confess. He finally does, but Ryan becomes angry when Boyd says he came clean because Kyle told him about "his friend" Jesus.
103	17	"Tanks for the Memories"	Victor Gonzalez	Mike Teverbaugh	February 26, 2016	5ATP16	6.87
Helen Potts (Patricia Richardson) has begun to sell her late husband's possessions and asks Mike and Vanessa to hand over to the buyer (Robin Roberts) some of the sold items for which she still feels an emotional attachment. They agree but, when Mike discovers the items in question are miniature World War II tanks, he goes to extremes to make the collection his own. Meanwhile, a Yelp user named "Bubba X" has posted a negative review of the Outdoor Man Grill, especially in regard to Kristin's performance as hostess, so Ed invites Bubba X back for a free meal and a better experience. Kristin is determined to make the meal go perfectly, but then discovers "Bubba X" is Eve.
104	18	"He Shed She Shed"	Victor Gonzalez	Lisa K. Nelson	March 11, 2016	5ATP18	6.24
Mike is sick of Vanessa using his den for work, so he decides to build her a detached "she-shed" that she can use as an office. However, after the shed is assembled, Mike decides he wants it for himself and tries to trick Vanessa into not wanting it anymore. Meanwhile, Kristin is named Employee of the Month at Outdoor Man, which leads to perennial winner Kyle getting jealous and telling her that Ed fixed the vote in her favor.
105	19	"Outdoor Woman"	Victor Gonzalez	Pat Bullard	March 18, 2016	5ATP19	7.04
Ed wants Outdoor Man to sell a line of rock climbing gear owned by celebrity rock climber Billie Cassidy (Reba McEntire), who happens to be Mike's ex-college girlfriend. Billie agrees, but only under the condition that Mike comes along with her to do a promotional shoot for the campaign. Vanessa is upset by this, especially after she finds out Mike never actually broke up with Billie. Meanwhile, Kristin and Ryan are having a yard sale and ask Mandy to help them sell some old stuff from their apartment. Mandy agrees, but she becomes upset when she discovers that one of the items being sold is a teddy bear she gave Kristin that had special meaning.
106	20	"Tattoo"	Tim Allen	Gracie Charters	April 8, 2016	5ATP20	6.44
Vanessa is desperate to change her relationship with the girls from mother/daughter to friend/friend, so she decides to get a tattoo after Boyd tells her the three of them were talking about getting them. Meanwhile, Ryan tells the Outdoor Man staff he wants to learn how to camp because he knows Kristin enjoys it, so Ed has him take lessons from Kyle with disastrous results.
107	21	"The Marriage Doctor"	Tim Clark	Lisa K. Nelson	April 15, 2016	5ATP21	6.34
When going over their wedding plans, Kyle reveals he doesn't want to marry Mandy at the Baxters' church because the new minister, Reverend Paul (Bill Engvall), requires marriage therapy before wedding ceremonies. Mike tells Kyle to use him and Vanessa as a strong marriage example, but Kyle tells Reverend Paul about a recent argument Mike and Vanessa had over their vacation plans, so they end up in therapy instead. Meanwhile, Eve is required to take a liberal position in a debate for her government class. Ryan offers to help her with talking points, but uses the time to poke fun at Eve's conservative beliefs to teach her an important lesson.
108	22	"The Shortcut"	Victor Gonzalez	Matt Berry & Ed Yeager	April 22, 2016	5ATP22	5.94
After Mike and Vanessa persuade her to turn down a buyout offer for her clothing designs, Mandy decides that, in order to save money, she and Kyle will move in with Mike and Vanessa after they're married. Mike and Vanessa agree to have a one-week trial, thinking they can make the couple miserable, but they wind up enjoying Kyle's presence and take up all of his time, much to Mandy's dismay. Meanwhile, after Mike gives Ed a gift to mark their 25 years together at Outdoor Man, Ed plans a staff dinner in honor of Mike and asks a reluctant Joe and Chuck to come up with speeches praising Mike.

=== Season 6 (2016–17) ===
No. overall	No. in season	Title	Directed by	Written by	Original release date	Prod. code	U.S. viewers (millions)
109	1	"Papa Bear"	Victor Gonzalez	Michael Shipley	September 23, 2016	6ATP01	5.95
The Outdoor Man Grill is getting ready to host its first Sunday brunch. Kristin has been working hard on it for days, but Ryan feels neglected because she has been spending all of her time at the restaurant preparing every little detail. Before the opening, Mike notices Kyle feeding some stray cats at the loading dock and tells him to stop and get back to work. Kyle forgets to close the door and a bear enters the warehouse. Fearing it might find its way into the Grill, Mike evacuates everyone to the office upstairs. Little do they know, the bear may just be looking for something.
110	2	"Gameday Forecast: Showers"	Victor Gonzalez	Kevin Abbott	September 30, 2016	6ATP02	5.84
A wedding shower is planned for both Kyle and Mandy, which annoys Mike because it is at the same time as the Chargers-Broncos football game. To make sure he and the guys can watch the game without irritating the women, Mike convinces the couple to hold separate parties. The guys go to Ryan's, but Ryan insists they play party games to honor Kyle instead of watching football. When Kyle is reluctant to disagree with Mike, Ryan explains that he needs to earn Mike's respect by having his own opinions. Meanwhile, Ed insists his superstitious rituals are the reason the Broncos won the Super Bowl the previous season, so he crashes Mandy's shower to watch the game and has the Baxter girls repeat everything they did last year.
111	3	"Where There's Smoke, There's Ire"	Victor Gonzalez	Lisa K. Nelson	October 7, 2016	6ATP03	5.68
Mike and Vanessa discover that Mandy has started vaping and order her to stop. However, Vanessa decides to give it a try after getting stressed out by a looming teachers' strike, eventually working back up to smoking cigarettes even though she quit 30 years ago. Mike finds out and has to figure out how to get her to kick the habit. Meanwhile, Kristin and Ryan discover a built-in wall safe while they are renovating their basement and enlist Kyle to help them open it.
112	4	"Boyd Will Be Boyd"	Victor Gonzalez	Kevin Hench	October 14, 2016	6ATP04	5.65
It's Boyd's 10th birthday and Mike is eager to continue the family tradition of giving him a shotgun and taking him hunting. Ryan, who wants Boyd to have nothing to do with hunting or guns, gets Boyd the gun himself, convinced that, when his son sees an animal, he won't shoot. Ryan accompanies Mike and Boyd on their hunting trip and is proved right, but things are not what they seem. Later, Mike shares a beer with Ryan when they find common ground in fatherhood. Meanwhile, as Kyle's mother will not be at his and Mandy's wedding, Vanessa offers to dance with him when Mike and Mandy do their father-daughter dance.
113	5	"Trick or Treat"	Victor Gonzalez	Ed Yeager	October 21, 2016	6ATP06	6.44
Vanessa insists that the family finally have the Halloween party they've been suggesting for years and has a reluctant Mike decide the theme. Hoping to make everyone hate it so much that it will be the last party, Mike takes inspiration from Kyle's Ed costume of last year and has the whole family swap roles (Eve and Mandy, Kristin and Ryan, and Vanessa and Kyle), so that they'll make fun of each other. The plan works perfectly, but Mike starts to feel bad when he sees how disappointed Vanessa is at their behavior and feels worse when Chuck arrives and relays news from Carol that Vanessa has been laid off.
114	6	"A New Place for One of Our People"	Victor Gonzalez	Mike Teverbaugh	November 4, 2016	6ATP05	6.26
After spending the first few months of her gap year working at Outdoor Man, Eve decides to quit and dedicate her time to volunteering with an organization that builds affordable homes. Hearing that Eve plans to live off her graduation money and may extend her gap year convinces Mike that she doesn't understand the real world, so he decides to teach her a lesson by charging her for rent and food. This backfires when Eve decides to move out to live in Kristin's basement. Meanwhile, Kyle, inspired by an online story about a man who turned a paper clip into a house through bartering, attempts the same thing with a laser pointer so he can get Mandy a car as a wedding present. This concerns Ed, who thinks the story is a scam.
115	7	"Bridezilla vs. The Baxters"	Victor Gonzalez	Maisie Culver	November 11, 2016	6ATP07	6.34
The Baxters are getting ready for Kyle and Mandy's wedding, but Mandy has become a bridezilla and keeps getting more demanding and unbearable. When she refuses to allow Kyle and best man Ed to wear high-top sneakers with their tuxedos, Ed quits as best man, and Eve agrees to take his place. When Mandy finally learns the story behind Kyle's wish to wear the high-top shoes, she realizes how selfish she's been, and she asks Ed to reconsider his decision.
116	8	"My Father the Car"	Victor Gonzalez	Jon Haller	November 18, 2016	6ATP08	6.55
Chuck's father has died and left him a vintage Chevrolet Corvair convertible that he wants to sell. Mike and Joe get into an argument over which one of them gets to buy it, which eventually leads to Mike discovering that Chuck has some unresolved feelings about his relationship with his father. Meanwhile, Kyle gives Vanessa a tacky Thanksgiving centerpiece that has been in his family for years, which she proceeds to accidentally break. Additionally, Eve, Kristin and Ryan face an awkward situation after the couple discovers Eve's new boyfriend stayed overnight in their basement.
117	9	"Precious Snowflake"	Victor Gonzalez	Mike Haukom	December 2, 2016	6ATP09	6.29
Mandy is on the committee that picks the commencement speaker for her business school's graduation and she asks Mike to do it. He agrees, but then finds out that the school requires his speech to be free of any microaggressions, like saying America is the land of opportunity. Being a huge free-speech advocate and thinking the college is suppressing ideas, Mike is angered and decides to go against the rules. Meanwhile, Cammy is home from college and tells Eve all about how great her life is. This leaves Eve, whose music career is going slowly, feeling jealous and discouraged.
118	10	"Help Wanted"	Victor Gonzalez	Sid Youngers	December 9, 2016	6ATP10	6.57
Since being laid off by the school district, Vanessa has been spending her time planning activities with family which they really don't want to do. Mike and Mandy try to help her get a new teaching job, but she keeps getting passed over in favor of younger candidates, causing her to think about getting plastic surgery in order to compete. Meanwhile, Ryan and Kyle argue over which one of them knows the most about zombies, so Eve presents the two with a hypothetical zombie apocalypse scenario and tests them on how they would survive.
119	11	"My Name is Rob"	Victor Gonzalez	Matt Berry	December 16, 2016	6ATP11	6.78
Mike and Vanessa find out about Eve's new boyfriend Rob and insist on having him over for brunch. Rob initially hits it off with them, but then Mike finds out he's a recovering alcoholic. This leaves Mike worried and, when he asks Eve how she feels about it, she later tells Mike she dumped Rob, which turns out to be a lie. Meanwhile, Mandy wants Kyle to get her an expensive watch for Christmas and asks Kristin to drop hints at him. When Kristin tries to do so, she discovers that Kyle has made an unusual present for Mandy in his taxidermy class.
120	12	"Three Sisters"	Victor Gonzalez	Holly Hester	January 6, 2017	6ATP12	7.75
Eve asks her parents to give her some money out of her college fund so that she can buy new recording equipment, but they refuse to do so. When Kristin offers her the money, it causes Mike to accuse her of undercutting their parenting. Kristin then accuses him of favoring Mandy by allowing her and Kyle to live at the Baxters' rent-free, which leads to an argument at dinner where all the daughters accuse each other of being favored by their parents. At Outdoor Man, Kyle accidentally walks in on Ed naked in his office, but Kyle is more embarrassed than Ed, so Ed tries to remedy the situation by taking Kyle with him to a steam room.
121	13	"Explorers"	Tim Clark	Mike Teverbaugh	January 13, 2017	6ATP13	7.17
As Mike and his friends are preparing for their colonoscopy exams, Outdoor Man receives an offer to submit an artifact to a renowned museum. Ed is excited because this is an honor he's wanted his whole life, but tensions rise when he tells Mike he intends to submit a 1,000 year old spearhead under his name, apparently not recalling that it was Mike who had actually found it. Meanwhile, with Ryan and Boyd on a trip to Canada, Kristin proposes that the sisters have a slumber party like the ones they had when they were younger. Mandy and Eve agree, but things don't go as planned when Vanessa crashes the party.
122	14	"A House Divided"	Victor Gonzalez	Michael Shipley	January 20, 2017	6ATP14	6.93
Mike and Vanessa are getting sick of newlywed Mandy and Kyle's overt displays of affection. When they ask them to tone it down, Mandy agrees on the condition that Mike and Vanessa do the same. This doesn't work, so Mandy and Kyle decide to fix the problem by getting their own place to live, which Vanessa doesn't want them to do. Meanwhile, Kristin hires Eve to perform at the Grill so she doesn't have to play outside in the cold weather. After a poor audience reception, Ed wants her to fire Eve but Kristin doesn't want to fire her own sister. Eve finds out about this and decides to take matters into her own hands.
123	15	"The Fixer"	Victor Gonzalez	Jon Haller	January 27, 2017	6ATP15	7.01
Mike gets frustrated with Ryan and Kyle's inability to make home repairs and tries to teach them, starting with the sink at Ryan and Kristin's house. When they prove to be less than enthusiastic, Mike tries to motivate them by pitting them against each other, which seems to be working but results in them getting into a fight. Eve is caught off-guard when Rob tells her he loves her. Eve is unsure how to respond, and Kristin and Mandy's advice just makes her more confused.
124	16	"The Force"	Jean Sagal	Kevin Hench	February 3, 2017	6ATP16	6.59
The deadline for Eve to make a decision about college is approaching, causing Mike and Vanessa to worry when she keeps putting off the topic. Eve later confesses to Mike that she secretly applied to the Air Force Academy in Colorado Springs and was accepted. Now, the two have to figure out how to break the news to Vanessa that Eve will be entering the military. When Ed has to have his dog Bogey put down. Kyle and Mandy decide to have Bogey stuffed so he can be around Ed forever, but they are surprised by Ed's reaction.
125	17	"The Friending Library"	Tim Allen	Pat Bullard	February 17, 2017	6ATP17	6.54
Vanessa has been feeling lonely ever since Carol moved to Los Angeles for a new job. Ryan suggests she start a lending library in the neighborhood so she can make some new friends. When she does so, a mystery person leaves a note in her copy of Jane Eyre and Eve sets out to track them down. Despite Mike's reluctance, Ed holds a "Meet Outdoor Man" contest where the winner gets to join Mike for his 500th vlog. The winner (Brad Leland) tells Mike he understands his secret messages about government conspiracies in the vlogs, and Mike can't convince him that he was just joking. Note: In the scene where Kristin is fixing a book box, the toolbox she is using has the name "Binford" on it. This is a reference to the fictional tool brand on Allen's previous series {Home Improvement}.
126	18	"Take Me to Church"	Victor Gonzalez	Jon Haller & Maisie Culver	February 24, 2017	6ATP18	6.60
Mike and Vanessa are worried that none of their daughters attend church anymore. Mike surmises it's because the sermons are too boring and decides to help Reverend Paul make them more relevant to the modern community. When this fails, Mike determines his daughters need to be involved rather than inspired. Meanwhile, Ryan has Kyle as his guest on his podcast, where they talk about the things Kristin and Mandy do that drive them nuts. Unbeknownst to them, Mandy actually listens to it and is not happy about what she hears, so she tells Kristin.
127	19	"House of Tutor"	Victor Gonzalez	Dylan Tanous	March 10, 2017	6ATP19	5.69
After Vanessa gets numerous requests from parents to tutor their kids and offers of payment, she decides to turn her volunteer tutoring into a business with other tutors, including Ryan. Mike helps her get the business started and gives her advice, but then she tells him to butt out after he gets into an argument with Ryan over what he is teaching the history students. Seeing Vanessa start her business and Eve selling songs online inspires Kyle to try to become an entrepreneur like the other Baxters. He presents several ideas to Eve, but her negative reaction does not discourage him.
128	20	"Heavy Meddle"	Victor Gonzalez	Richard Brandon Manus	March 17, 2017	6ATP20	6.15
Eve moves back into the Baxter house and Mike and Vanessa find out that Rob didn't invite her to his parents' anniversary party. Mike thinks she should ignore it, while Vanessa feels Eve should talk to him about it. Vanessa's meddling causes the couple to get into a fight and break up. Elsewhere, Kristin and Ryan have reserved a night at an escape room with some friends who cancel on them. Mandy and Kyle volunteer to go in their place, but Kristin and Ryan suspect they aren't intelligent enough to be of any help solving the clues.
129	21	"Bad Heir Day"	Victor Gonzalez	Ed Yeager & Lisa K. Nelson	March 24, 2017	6ATP21	6.10
While trying to find Kyle and Mandy an apartment, the Baxters find out from Chuck that Kyle's mom passed away three months ago and he kept it a secret. Kyle insists he's fine but, when they discover she left him her trailer in her will, he gets angry and refuses to take it. Meanwhile, Eve discovers that Boyd has been lying about Ryan's job because he's embarrassed about being home-schooled. When she mocks Ryan about it, she learns that Boyd has been wanting to go back to regular school and Ryan won't let him because he's afraid to be without purpose.
130	22	"Shadowboxing"	Victor Gonzalez	Michael Shipley & Mike Haukom	March 31, 2017	6ATP22	6.06
Mandy shadows Mike as part of her business class assignment. However, Mandy's professor tells her that a textbook approach to conflict resolution is better than what she saw in Mike's experienced approach, so Mandy tries to prove it by settling an argument between Chuck and Joe, but she only makes things worse. Kristin, believing Vanessa is stressed from her work and chores, convinces her to join her and Eve's kickboxing class to relieve the stress. While attempting to motivate her, Kristin accidentally knocks out Vanessa during a sparring match.

=== Season 7 (2018–19) ===
No. overall	No. in season	Title	Directed by	Written by	Original release date	Prod. code	U.S. viewers (millions)
131	1	"Welcome Baxter"	John Pasquin	Kevin Abbott	September 28, 2018	7ATP01	8.13
132	2	"Man vs. Myth"	John Pasquin	Matt Berry	October 5, 2018	7ATP02	6.15
133	3	"Giving Mike the Business"	John Pasquin	Jon Haller	October 12, 2018	7ATP03	6.32
134	4	"Bride of Prankenstein"	Jean Sagal	Claire Mulaney	October 19, 2018	7ATP07	6.28
135	5	"One Flew Into the Empty Nest"	Andy Cadiff	Ed Yeager	November 2, 2018	7ATP04	6.11
136	6	"The Courtship of Vanessa's Mother"	Andy Cadiff	Mike Teverbaugh & Linda Teverbaugh	November 9, 2018	7ATP05	6.30
137	7	"Dreams vs. Realty"	Jean Sagal	Jacob Brown	November 16, 2018	7ATP08	5.97
138	8	"HR's Rough n' Stuff"	Victor Gonzalez	Josh Greenberg	December 7, 2018	7ATP09	5.43
139	9	"The Gift of the Mike Guy"	Robbie Countryman	Jon Haller	December 14, 2018	7ATP10	5.44
140	10	"Three for the Road"	Dave Cove	Jordan Black	January 4, 2019	7ATP06	5.66
141	11	"Common Ground"	Phill Lewis	Pat Bullard	January 11, 2019	7ATP11	6.16
142	12	"Cabin Pressure"	Victor Gonzalez	Mike Teverbaugh & Linda Teverbaugh	February 1, 2019	7ATP12	5.93
143	13	"The Best Man"	Victor Gonzalez	Matt Berry	February 15, 2019	7ATP14	5.98
144	14	"Sibling Quibbling"	Victor Gonzalez	Josh Greenberg	February 15, 2019	7ATP15	5.64
145	15	"Arrest Her Development"	Victor Gonzalez	Erin Berry	February 22, 2019	7ATP13	5.37
146	16	"Urban Exploring"	Victor Gonzalez	Jordan Black	March 1, 2019	7ATP16	5.44
147	17	"Cards on the Table"	Victor Gonzalez	Jacob Brown	March 8, 2019	7ATP17	5.33
148	18	"Otherwise Engaged"	Victor Gonzalez	Story by : Tommy Wright; Teleplay by : Brett Isaacson & TJ Martell	March 15, 2019	7ATP19	5.16
149	19	"The Passion of Paul"	Tim Allen	Pat Bullard	March 22, 2019	7ATP18	5.09
150	20	"Yass Queen"	Tim Clark	Kevin Hench	April 19, 2019	7ATP20	4.82
151	21	"The Favourite"	Jean Sagal	Ed Yeager	May 3, 2019	7ATP21	4.26
152	22	"A Moving Finale"	Victor Gonzalez	Kevin Abbott	May 10, 2019	7ATP22	4.72

=== Season 8 (2020) ===
No. overall	No. in season	Title	Directed by	Written by	Original release date	Prod. code	U.S. viewers (millions)
153	1	"No Parental Guidance"	Andy Cadiff	Kevin Abbott	January 2, 2020	8ATP01	5.21
154	2	"Wrench in the Works"	Andy Cadiff	Jon Haller	January 2, 2020	8ATP02	5.21
155	3	"Yours, Wine, and Ours"	Victor Gonzalez	Mike Teverbaugh & Linda Teverbaugh	January 9, 2020	8ATP03	4.35
156	4	"You’ve Got Male (or Female)"	Victor Gonzalez	Kevin Hench	January 9, 2020	8ATP04	4.35
157	5	"The Office"	Victor Gonzalez	Pat Bullard	January 16, 2020	8ATP06	4.79
158	6	"Mysterious Ways"	Victor Gonzalez	Matt Berry	January 16, 2020	8ATP05	4.79
159	7	"Bedtime Story"	Robbie Countryman	Josh Greenberg	January 23, 2020	8ATP07	4.45
160	8	"Romancing the Stone"	Robbie Countryman	Mackenzie Yeager	January 30, 2020	8ATP08	3.94
161	9	"Girls Rock"	Dave Cove	Claire Mulaney	February 6, 2020	8ATP09	3.98
162	10	"Break Out the Campaign"	Tim Allen	Jordan Black	February 13, 2020	8ATP10	3.66
163	11	"Baked Sale"	Andy Cadiff	Jenny Yang	February 20, 2020	8ATP11	3.65
164	12	"I'm with Cupid"	Andy Cadiff	Jacob Brown	February 27, 2020	8ATP13	4.10
165	13	"Student Doubt"	Leslie Kolins Small	Pat Bullard	March 5, 2020	8ATP12	3.52
166	14	"This Too Shall Bass"	Andy Cadiff	Erin Berry	March 12, 2020	8ATP14	3.67
167	15	"Chili Chili Bang Bang"	Victor Gonzalez	Jon Haller	March 19, 2020	8ATP15	4.70
168	16	"Along Came a Spider"	Victor Gonzalez	Ed Yeager	March 26, 2020	8ATP16	4.40
169	17	"Keep the Change"	Victor Gonzalez	Mike Teverbaugh & Linda Teverbaugh	April 2, 2020	8ATP17	4.10
170	18	"Garage Band"	Amanda Fuller	Josh Greenberg	April 9, 2020	8ATP18	4.16
171	19	"The Big LeBaxter"	Andy Cadiff	Erin Berry	April 16, 2020	8ATP19	3.86
172	20	"Extrasensory Deception"	Victor Gonzalez	Story by : Tommy Wright; Teleplay by : Brett Isaacson & TJ Martell	April 23, 2020	8ATP20	4.14
173	21	"How You Like Them Pancakes?"	Victor Gonzalez	Jacob Brown	April 30, 2020	8ATP21	4.25

=== Season 9 (2021) ===
No. overall	No. in season	Title	Directed by	Written by	Original release date	Prod. code	U.S. viewers (millions)
174	1	"Time Flies"	Victor Gonzalez	Erin Berry	January 3, 2021	9ATP02	2.52
175	2	"Dual Time"	Victor Gonzalez	Jon Haller	January 7, 2021	9ATP01	3.30
176	3	"High on the Corporate Ladder"	Victor Gonzalez	Mike Teverbaugh & Linda Teverbaugh	January 14, 2021	9ATP04	2.84
177	4	"Jen Again"	Victor Gonzalez	Jenny Yang	January 21, 2021	9ATP05	2.64
178	5	"Outdoor Toddler"	Victor Gonzalez	Kevin Hench	January 28, 2021	9ATP03	2.53
179	6	"A Fool and His Money"	Victor Gonzalez	Josh Greenberg	February 4, 2021	9ATP06	2.51
180	7	"Preschool Confidential"	Victor Gonzalez	Pat Bullard	February 11, 2021	9ATP07	2.25
181	8	"Lost and Found"	Victor Gonzalez	King Hassan	February 18, 2021	9ATP08	2.32
182	9	"Grill in the Mist"	Robbie Countryman	Jacob Brown	February 25, 2021	9ATP10	2.52
183	10	"Meatless Mike"	Dave Cove	Ed Yeager	March 4, 2021	9ATP12	2.50
184	11	"Granny Nanny"	Robbie Countryman	Claire Mulaney	March 11, 2021	9ATP11	2.42
185	12	"Midwife Crisis"	Victor Gonzalez	Kevin Hench	March 18, 2021	9ATP13	2.38
186	13	"Your Move"	Victor Gonzalez	Erin Berry	March 25, 2021	9ATP14	2.42
187	14	"The Two Nieces of Eve"	Dave Cove	Jordan Black	April 8, 2021	9ATP09	2.22
188	15	"Butterfly Effect"	Amanda Fuller	Jon Haller	April 15, 2021	9ATP15	2.47
189	16	"Parent-normal Activity"	Jordan Masterson	Story by : Tommy Wright; Teleplay by : Brett Isaacson & TJ Martell	April 22, 2021	9ATP16	2.63
190	17	"Love & Negotiation"	Christoph Sanders	Mike Teverbaugh & Linda Teverbaugh	April 29, 2021	9ATP17	2.11
191	18	"Yoga and Boo-Boo"	Leslie Kolins Small	Pat Bullard	May 6, 2021	9ATP18	2.14
192	19	"Murder, She Wanted"	Victor Gonzalez	Josh Greenberg & Jordan Black	May 13, 2021	9ATP19	2.35
193	20	"Baxter Boot Camp"	Kit Wilkinson	Ed Yeager	May 20, 2021	9ATP20	2.63
194	21	"Keep on Truckin'"	Andy Cadiff	Tim Allen	May 20, 2021	9ATP21	2.63

== Ratings ==
Last Man Standing : U.S. viewers per episode (millions)

Season	Episode number																								Average
Season	1	2	3	4	5	6	7	8	9	10	11	12	13	14	15	16	17	18	19	20	21	22	23	24	Average
1	13.19	13.19	10.34	9.88	9.42	9.26	9.06	9.29	10.32	8.79	7.51	7.93	7.57	8.59	7.78	8.02	7.64	7.46	7.50	6.98	6.84	6.51	6.52	6.62	8.61
2	8.07	7.44	7.13	6.68	6.72	6.54	6.81	6.63	6.89	6.62	6.92	7.29	6.74	6.04	7.05	6.96	6.43	7.85	–						6.93
3	6.67	5.73	6.22	6.03	6.19	6.36	6.22	6.15	6.21	6.27	6.27	7.18	6.22	6.34	6.92	6.37	6.38	6.47	6.30	5.90	5.39	6.10	–		6.27
4	6.91	6.91	6.62	6.79	6.18	6.71	6.67	7.07	7.10	6.66	5.99	8.60	6.88	7.51	7.23	6.58	7.35	6.94	6.97	6.56	6.44	6.16	–		6.85
5	6.27	6.55	6.35	6.58	7.16	6.94	6.85	7.47	7.29	6.67	6.84	7.33	6.99	6.87	6.66	6.67	6.87	6.24	7.04	6.44	6.34	5.94	–		6.74
6	5.95	5.84	5.68	5.65	6.44	6.26	6.34	6.55	6.29	6.57	6.78	7.75	7.17	6.93	7.01	6.59	6.54	6.60	5.69	6.15	6.10	6.06	–		6.41
7	8.13	6.15	6.32	6.28	6.11	6.30	5.97	5.43	5.44	5.66	6.16	5.93	5.98	5.64	5.37	5.44	5.33	5.16	5.09	4.82	4.26	4.72	–		5.71
8	5.21	5.21	4.35	4.35	4.79	4.79	4.45	3.94	3.98	3.66	3.64	4.10	3.52	3.67	4.70	4.40	4.10	4.16	3.86	4.14	4.25	–			4.25
9	2.52	3.30	2.84	2.64	2.53	2.51	2.25	2.32	2.52	2.50	2.42	2.38	2.42	2.22	2.47	2.63	2.11	2.14	2.35	2.63	2.63	–			2.49

Audience measurement performed by Nielsen Media Research
