= Alex Skuby =

American actor (born 1972)

- Born: December 27, 1972 (age 53); Neptune City, New Jersey, U.S.
- Other name: Alex S. Skuby
- Occupation: Actor
- Years active: 1996–present
- Spouse: Mo Collins (m. 2013)
- Website: theskubycompany.com

Alex Skuby (born December 27, 1972) is an American actor who has appeared in film and television. He is most known for his role on The King of Queens as Doug Pruzan, Carrie's boss and a lawyer at her Manhattan law firm.

Born in Neptune City, New Jersey, Skuby grew up in Manasquan, New Jersey. Skuby graduated from Wall High School in 1990 and attended Brookdale Community College.

He is the co-host of comedy podcast "Zen AF" with comedian Wayne Hannah and filmmaker Tyler Boyco.

== Filmography ==
=== Film ===
Year	Film	Role	Notes
1996	Early Edition	Gino	Episode: "The Choice"
1998	A Will of Their Own	Pete	TV Mini-series
1998	ER	Medivac/Renato	2 episodes
1998	To Have & to Hold	Jimmy	Episode: "Pilot"
1998	Buddy Faro	News Reporter	Episode: "Death by Airbrush"
1999	Payback	Oakwood Arms Tough #2	
1999	Buffy the Vampire Slayer	Vincent	Episode: "Bad Girls"
1999	Chicago Hope	Mark Porter	Episode: "Teacher's Pet"
1999	Everything's Relative	Officer Cloud	Episode: "City of Flies"
1999	Angel	Harlan	Episode: "Sense and Sensitivity"
2000	Ready to Rumble	Young Doctor	
2000	Strip Mall	Sweeny	
2000–2003	The King of Queens	Doug Pruzan Esq.	13 episodes
2002	The Division	Russ Dempsey	Episode: "Keep Hope Alive"
2003	Platonically Incorrect		
2003	Becker	Cop	Episode: "Mr. and Ms. Conception"
2004	Without a Trace	Brian	Episode: "Nickel and Dimed: Part 2"
2004	House M.D.	John Funsten	Episode: "Paternity"
2004	24	Sergeant Dennis McGrath	Episode: "Day 4: 10:00 a.m.-11:00 a.m."
2004	Less than Perfect	Fran	Episode: "Casey V. Kronsky"
2006	Finding Preet	Jake	
2006, 2009	CSI: Crime Scene Investigation	Federal Agent / FBI Agent Paul Briggs	2 episodes
2007	Pandemic	Captain Nick Slater	TV movie
2007	D.T.A. Productions	Dick Sanderson	Short
2008	Baby Fighting	Officer Mike Wasisco	Short
2008	CSI: Miami	Ricky Moore	Episode: "Tipping Point"
2009	Castle	Charlie DePetro	Episode: "One Man's Treasure"
2011	The Mentalist	Officer Carl Beller	Episode: "Rhapsody in Red"
2012	Last Man Standing	Frank Milbauer	Episode: "Ding Dong Ditch"
2012	Ave 43	Lonny	Chapter 42 & 43
2012	First Neighbor	The Neighbor	
2013	Southland	Steve	Episode: "Reckoning"
2015	Lone Hunter	Roy	Short
2015	Bones	Gavin Chadwick	2 episodes
2015	RelationFixTM	Graham	
2015	Spades	Anders	
2016–2018	The Fosters	Detective Joe Gray	9 episodes
2017	Santa Clarita Diet	Lonnie	Episode: "The Book!"
2021	Fear the Walking Dead	Eli	Episode: Till Death

=== Video games ===
Year	Title	Role	Notes
1998	MechCommander	Panther	
2003	CSI: Crime Scene Investigation	Federal Agent	
2014	The Elder Scrolls Online	Additional voices	
2014	Transformers Universe	Prowl	
