= Last Man Standing (American TV series) =

American television sitcom (2011–2017, 2018–2021)

- Genre: Sitcom
- Created by: Jack Burditt
- Starring: Tim Allen; Nancy Travis; Alexandra Krosney; Molly Ephraim; Kaitlyn Dever; Christoph Sanders; Héctor Elizondo; Amanda Fuller; Flynn Morrison; Jordan Masterson; Jonathan Adams; Molly McCook; Jet Jurgensmeyer; Krista Marie Yu
- Music by: Monte Montgomery & Carl Thiel (season 1); Monte Montgomery (seasons 2–9)
- Country of origin: United States
- Original language: English
- No. of seasons: 9
- No. of episodes: 194 (list of episodes)

Production
- Executive producers: Tim Allen; Becky Clements; Marty Adelstein; Shawn Levy; Richard Baker; Rick Messina; John Pasquin; Kevin Abbott; Michael Shipley; Matt Berry; Tim Doyle; Kevin Hench; Jack Burditt
- Producer: John Amodeo
- Cinematography: Donald A. Morgan; George Mooradian ("Baxter Boot Camp")
- Editors: Pamela J. Marshall; Kris Trexler
- Camera setup: Multi-camera
- Running time: 21 minutes
- Production companies: 21 Laps-Adelstein Productions; Double Wide Productions (Note: Season 1, episodes 1–11.); Mr. Bigshot Fancy-Pants Productions, Inc. (Note: Seasons 2–4.); Lyonsberry Productions (Note: Seasons 5 and 6.); NestEgg Productions (Note: Season 1, episodes 12–24 and Seasons 7–9.); 20th Television (Note: Credited as 20th Century Fox Television for the first 8 seasons.)

Original release
- Network: ABC
- Release: October 11, 2011 – March 31, 2017
- Network: Fox
- Release: September 28, 2018 – May 20, 2021

Last Man Standing is an American sitcom created by Jack Burditt. It aired from October 11, 2011, to March 31, 2017, on ABC, and then again from September 28, 2018, to May 20, 2021, on Fox. The show stars Tim Allen as Mike Baxter, an executive at Outdoor Man, a sporting goods store chain headquartered in Denver, Colorado. Mike is a married father of three daughters and a grandfather to his eldest daughter's son. Last Man Standing was a joint production by 21 Laps-Adelstein Productions, NestEgg Productions, and 20th Television.

Last Man Standing originally ran on ABC from 2011 to 2017 for six seasons, and entered syndication in 2015. ABC did not renew Last Man Standing for a seventh season in May 2017, amid controversy. In 2018, Fox announced it had picked up the show for a seventh season, which premiered on September 28, 2018. In May 2020, Fox renewed the series for a ninth and final season, which premiered on January 3, 2021, and aired through May 20, 2021.

== Premise ==
The series follows Mike Baxter, a senior executive and director of marketing for the Outdoor Man sporting goods store chain based in Denver, Colorado. His home life is initially filled with his wife and three daughters (hence the "last man" in the show's title), along with a grandson that was born from one of his daughters. His life later extends to the young men who are married to or dating his daughters.

== Episodes ==
Season	Episodes	Originally released		
Season	Episodes	First released	Last released	Network
1	24	October 11, 2011	May 8, 2012	ABC
2	18	November 2, 2012	March 22, 2013	ABC
3	22	September 20, 2013	April 25, 2014	ABC
4	22	October 3, 2014	April 17, 2015	ABC
5	22	September 25, 2015	April 22, 2016	ABC
6	22	September 23, 2016	March 31, 2017	ABC
7	22	September 28, 2018	May 10, 2019	Fox
8	21	January 2, 2020	April 30, 2020	Fox
9	21	January 3, 2021	May 20, 2021	Fox

== Cast and characters ==
=== Main ===
- Tim Allen as Mike Baxter: Mike is a father of three daughters and the director of marketing for the Outdoor Man chain of sporting goods stores. Mike staunchly supports traditional, conservative values.
- Nancy Travis as Vanessa Baxter (née Davidson), Mike's wife: Vanessa is a geologist working in the energy industry. In season four, Vanessa becomes frustrated with her job and decides to become a high school science teacher. After being laid off as a teacher due to budget cuts, Vanessa begins her own tutoring business.
- Alexandra Krosney (season 1) and Amanda Fuller (seasons 2–9) as Kristin Baxter-Vogelson, the oldest daughter who was initially a teenage mother trying to raise her son on her own.
- Molly Ephraim (seasons 1–6) and Molly McCook (seasons 7–9) as Mandy Baxter-Anderson, the learning-impaired, fashion-focused middle daughter.
- Kaitlyn Dever (regular, seasons 1–6; recurring, seasons 7–9) as Eve Baxter, the youngest daughter, a strong scholar and athlete with military aspirations who is clearly Mike's favorite child.
- Christoph Sanders as Kyle Anderson, a young employee at Outdoor Man who initially dates Kristin, but later dates and marries Mandy.
- Héctor Elizondo as Ed Alzate, Mike's longtime business partner, of Basque heritage, and later Vanessa's stepfather, Kristin, Mandy, and Eve's step-grandfather, and Boyd's step-great-grandfather.
- Evan and Luke Kruntchev (recurring, season 1), Flynn Morrison (regular, seasons 2–6), and Jet Jurgensmeyer (regular, season 7; guest star, season 8) as Boyd Baxter, the son of Kristin and Ryan and grandson of Mike and Vanessa.
- Nick Jonas (guest star, season 1) and Jordan Masterson (recurring, seasons 2–3; regular, seasons 4–9) as Ryan Vogelson, Boyd's Canadian father who later re-enters his son's life and later marries Kristin. He is very "left-wing" in his views, and thus clashes a lot with Mike.
- Jonathan Adams as Chuck Larabee (recurring, seasons 2–3; regular, seasons 4–9): Mike and Vanessa's neighbor, a retired U.S. Marine who later becomes the head of security at Outdoor Man.
- Krista Marie Yu as Jen (seasons 7–9), Vanessa's ethnocentric foreign exchange student from Hong Kong who moves in with the Baxters in season 7.

=== Recurring ===
- Robert Forster as Bud Baxter (seasons 1, 3–4, 7), Mike's widower father, Kristin, Mandy, and Eve's grandfather, and Boyd's great-grandfather. Forster died October 11, 2019, prior to season 8.
- Erika Alexander (seasons 2–5) and Tisha Campbell (season 7–9) as Carol Larabee, Chuck's wife and Mike and Vanessa's neighbor.
- Carla Jimenez as Blanca Alvarez (seasons 2–4), the Baxters' Guatemalan-born housekeeper who also works for Mandy in her fashion business.
- Sarah Gilman as Cammy Harris (seasons 2–6), Eve's soccer teammate and extremely chatty best friend.
- Jonathan Taylor Thomas as John Baker (seasons 2–3), Kristin's boss at a fancy restaurant where she works.
- Tye Sheridan as Justin (seasons 3–4), Eve's fellow Jr. ROTC member, football teammate and brief boyfriend.
- Zachary Gordon as Andrew (season 3), Eve's nerdy classmate.
- Joely Fisher as Wendi Gracin (seasons 3–5), Ed's obnoxious younger girlfriend, whom he meets near the end of season three.
- Patricia Richardson as Helen Potts (season 4), the Baxters' widowed neighbor, who sees a lot of her deceased husband in Mike.
- Bill Engvall as Reverend Paul (seasons 5–9), the new pastor of the Baxter family's church.
- Jay Leno as Joe Leonard (seasons 5–9), a semi-retired auto technician who later works in the repair shop at Outdoor Man.
- Travis Tope as Rob (season 6), Eve's boyfriend who is studying criminal justice at University of Colorado Boulder.
- Susan Sullivan as Bonnie Davidson (later Alzate) (seasons 7–9), Vanessa's mother, Kristin, Mandy, and Eve's grandmother, and Boyd's great-grandmother who becomes Ed's wife.

== Production ==
=== Development and casting ===
Last Man Standing first appeared on ABC's development slate in late 2010 when writer Jack Burditt received a put pilot commitment from ABC under the original title Man Up. In January 2011, ABC green-lighted production of a pilot episode under the title Last Days of Man. On February 18, Tim Allen, who had been attached to the potential series from the beginning, officially joined the project in the lead role. At the end of March, Nancy Travis joined the cast in the leading female role as Allen's "smart and loving wife who doesn't miss much". Soon thereafter, Héctor Elizondo came on board in a supporting role as the boss to Allen's character.

=== Shooting schedule ===
On May 13, 2011, ABC picked up the pilot for the 2011–2012 television season under the new title Last Man Standing. On May 17, 2011, ABC announced that the series would air on Tuesday nights at 8 Eastern/7 Central. It debuted on October 11, 2011, with the first two episodes airing in a one-hour premiere.

On November 3, 2011, the series was picked up for a full season of twenty-two episodes. On January 12, 2012, the order was increased to twenty-four episodes.

On May 11, 2012, ABC renewed the series for a second season set to air in the 2012–2013 season in November.

On June 11, 2012, Tim Doyle was hired as the new showrunner of the series. Doyle was the third showrunner that the series had since it entered production. Doyle replaced Kevin Abbott, who joined the staff as the showrunner mid-way in the first season. Abbott replaced series creator Jack Burditt, who was the showrunner for the first thirteen episodes. Unlike Burditt, who is no longer credited as an executive producer, Abbott continued to serve as an executive producer while showrunning the fellow ABC sitcom Malibu Country starring Reba McEntire. Both Last Man Standing and Malibu Country aired as a part of ABC's Friday night lineup for the 2012–2013 primetime television season. On November 8, 2012, Abbott re-joined the Last Man Standing crew full-time, after a stint in rehab, and gave Nastaran Dibai full showrunning duties of Malibu Country.

On June 11, 2012, it was announced that Alexandra Krosney (Kristin) was let go from the show for creative reasons. Krosney was replaced by Amanda Fuller in season 2. On June 19, 2012, it was also announced that twins Luke and Evan Kruntchev, who played the role of Boyd in season 1, would not be returning; they were replaced by Flynn Morrison in season 2. The character of Boyd was also age-advanced from two years old to five years old. Jordan Masterson plays Ryan, Boyd's father, in a recurring role beginning in season 2. The role was previously played by Nick Jonas, who guest-starred in one episode in season 1.

The second season initially received a 13-episode order. ABC announced on November 12, 2012, that an additional three scripts had been ordered. On November 27, five more episodes were ordered to bring the second-season episode total to 18.

On May 10, 2013, the series was renewed for a third season, which premiered on September 20, 2013, and ended on April 25, 2014, after 22 episodes.

On May 10, 2014, ABC renewed Last Man Standing for a fourth season, which premiered on October 3, 2014. Allen and Elizondo guest-starred as their Last Man Standing characters in a crossover episode with the fellow ABC Friday sitcom Cristela.

On May 10, 2015, ABC announced the show had been renewed for a fifth season. Last Man Standing had become a solid performer for the Friday night lineup at ABC, which with the help of Shark Tank and 20/20 has become the top network among adults 18–49 for the night. Leading off Friday night for ABC, the sitcom averaged a 1.8 rating in adults 18–49 and 8.2 million viewers overall, according to Nielsen's Live+7 estimates.

On May 13, 2016, ABC renewed the series for a sixth season, which premiered on September 23, 2016.

The entire set of the show had to be rebuilt following its cancellation on ABC and subsequent revival on Fox in 2018, according to representatives of an unrelated studio company who visited the set and attended a taping of the show at Radford Studio Center.

On March 15, 2020, production on the series was shut down during the COVID-19 pandemic.

=== Cancellation ===
On May 10, 2017, ABC canceled Last Man Standing after six seasons, despite the series being the second-most-watched ABC sitcom during the 2016–17 season (based on Live+7 figures), with ratings remaining mostly steady during its sixth season. The cancellation caused the show's fans to question its motivation, and many took to social media to voice their displeasure and petition for another network to pick up the show. It also happened some months after lead actor Tim Allen (who is also a real-life Republican) said in an interview on Jimmy Kimmel Live!, that being a Republican in Hollywood is "like 1930s Germany. You gotta be real careful around here, you know. You'll get beat up if you don't believe what everybody believes". His comment was widely criticized, especially his comparing the treatment of Republicans in Hollywood with Nazi Germany.

A viewer petition on the website Change.org calling for ABC to reinstate Last Man Standing surpassed 380,000 signatures as of May 23, 2017. In a conference call with reporters earlier in May, ABC president Channing Dungey stated, "Last Man Standing was a challenging one for me, because it was a steady performer. Once we made the decision not to continue with comedy on Friday, it was just kind of that's where we landed." Dungey cited studio ownership, future creative direction, ratings, and viewer engagement as all factors in her decision. A year later, the petition's signatures had grown to 438,000.

On May 16, 2017, Allen expressed his displeasure with the cancellation, writing: "Stunned and blindsided by the network I called home for the last six years."

On May 20, 2017, Howard Kurtzman, president of 20th Century Fox Television, reportedly showed some interest in his studio continuing to produce the show. "We're starting to explore that," Kurtzman said. "... Jonnie and I are hopeful that we can find another home for it." Variety also confirmed in an exclusive report that 20th Century Fox Television would shop the series to other networks and streaming services in hopes it would be picked up for a seventh season; another home was not quickly found, however.

In August 2017, Allen expressed his appreciation for support by the show's fans to bring it back, and said the talent behind the show had much more to add.

=== Revival on Fox ===
On May 3, 2018, Allen wrote that a return "just might be a reality" and prompted the show's supporters to "keep it up". The same day, TVLine reported that Fox was "poised to" resurrect Last Man Standing for the 2018–19 TV season, adding that Tim Allen is "officially on board". Deadline Hollywood reported that Fox was in talks for another season, but it was "by no means a sure thing", suggesting it would depend on whether the actors could be re-signed "at reasonable salaries". On May 11, 2018, Fox TV's CEOs and chairmen announced that Fox had officially picked up Last Man Standing for a seventh season. Dana Walden, chairman of Fox Television Group, later hinted that the return of Last Man Standing was in part a response to the huge success of the Roseanne revival on ABC earlier in 2018: "Obviously, I think everyone took a good, hard look at the performance of Roseanne. It did so well, and it certainly did remind us that we have a huge, iconic comedy star in our Fox family in Tim Allen."

On July 2, Fox announced that, in addition to Allen, series regulars Nancy Travis, Amanda Fuller, Hector Elizondo, Christoph Sanders, Jordan Masterson and Jonathan Adams had all signed on to appear in the season 7 revival. Molly Ephraim and Flynn Morrison both opted not to return for the new season, with Fox announcing their roles ("Mandy" and "Boyd", respectively) would be recast ahead of season 7. On August 6, 2018, it was announced that Molly McCook and Jet Jurgensmeyer would be taking over the roles of Mandy and Boyd, respectively. The article also stated that Kaitlyn Dever, who recently signed on to play a lead role in the 2019 Netflix miniseries Unbelievable, would return as Eve in a recurring role only.

For the seventh season, the show aired in the same Friday night time slot as for the last five of its six seasons on ABC; the show was renewed for an eighth season, and was moved to a new time slot, as Fox had signed an agreement to air WWE SmackDown on Friday nights beginning in fall 2019. When the Fox schedule was released in May 2019, Last Man Standing was placed in a Thursday night time slot, but only in weeks when Fox would not air NFL or XFL games. On October 24, 2019, it was announced that season eight had been scheduled to premiere on January 2, 2020, with 2 back-to-back episodes airing in an hour time slot for three weeks on January 2, 9 and 16, before returning to a one-episode-a-week time slot of 8/7c starting on January 23. On May 19, 2020, Fox renewed the series for a ninth and final season, which premiered on January 3, 2021.

== Release ==
=== Broadcast ===
Last Man Standing premiered on ABC in the United States on October 11, 2011. Despite being ABC's second-highest rated sitcom for the 2016–17 season, ABC declined to renew Last Man Standing for a seventh season amid controversy, causing fans to petition for its renewal. The following year, Fox announced it had picked up the show for a seventh season, which premiered on September 28, 2018. In May 2020, Fox renewed the series for a ninth and final season, which premiered on January 3, 2021. The series concluded after 194 episodes on May 20, 2021.

The series aired on City in Canada. In the United Kingdom and Ireland, it premiered on October 9, 2012, on Sky One, which aired the first two seasons before dropping it due to low ratings; the show was bought by E4, where it premiered on March 13, 2017. Channel 4 then reran the program on Sunday mornings from July until September 2017.

In Australia, Last Man Standing was broadcast on Fox8, Network Ten, One and Eleven in Australia. In New Zealand, it aired on TV3.

In Flanders (Belgium), it airs on VTM. In the Netherlands, it previously aired on RTL 7, but as of 2021 it airs on Comedy Central. In Germany the show airs on ProSieben.

=== Syndication ===
On September 3, 2015, it was announced that Freeform (formerly known as ABC Family) had obtained syndication rights to the series, which aired from September 28, 2015 until November 28, 2018. On May 15, 2015, it was announced that Hallmark Channel had obtained the rights to the sitcom, and they aired the series from 2016 to 2017. Last Man Standing aired on CMT from 2015 until 2024. In fall 2016, the series was syndicated to local TV stations. Last Man Standing aired on NewsNation (formerly WGN America) from 2018 until 2023, and USA Network from 2021 until 2023. The sitcom was shown on Up TV from January 1, 2023, and Laff from September 25, 2023.

=== Home media ===
DVD and Blu-ray name	Ep's	Release date
Last Man Standing: The Complete First Season	24	May 13, 2014
Last Man Standing: The Complete Second Season	18	May 13, 2014
Last Man Standing: The Complete Third Season	22	October 28, 2014
Last Man Standing: The Complete Fourth Season	22	October 5, 2015
Last Man Standing: The Complete Fifth Season	22	June 26, 2018
Last Man Standing: The Complete Sixth Season	22	June 26, 2018
Last Man Standing: The Complete Seventh Season	22	June 23, 2020
Last Man Standing: The Complete Eighth Season	21	August 4, 2020
Last Man Standing: The Complete Ninth and Final Season	21	February 8, 2022

== International adaptations ==
A Vietnamese adaptation named Mẹ ơi, bố đâu rồi? aired on VTV3 from November 5, 2018 to January 15, 2019.

== Reception ==
=== Critical response ===
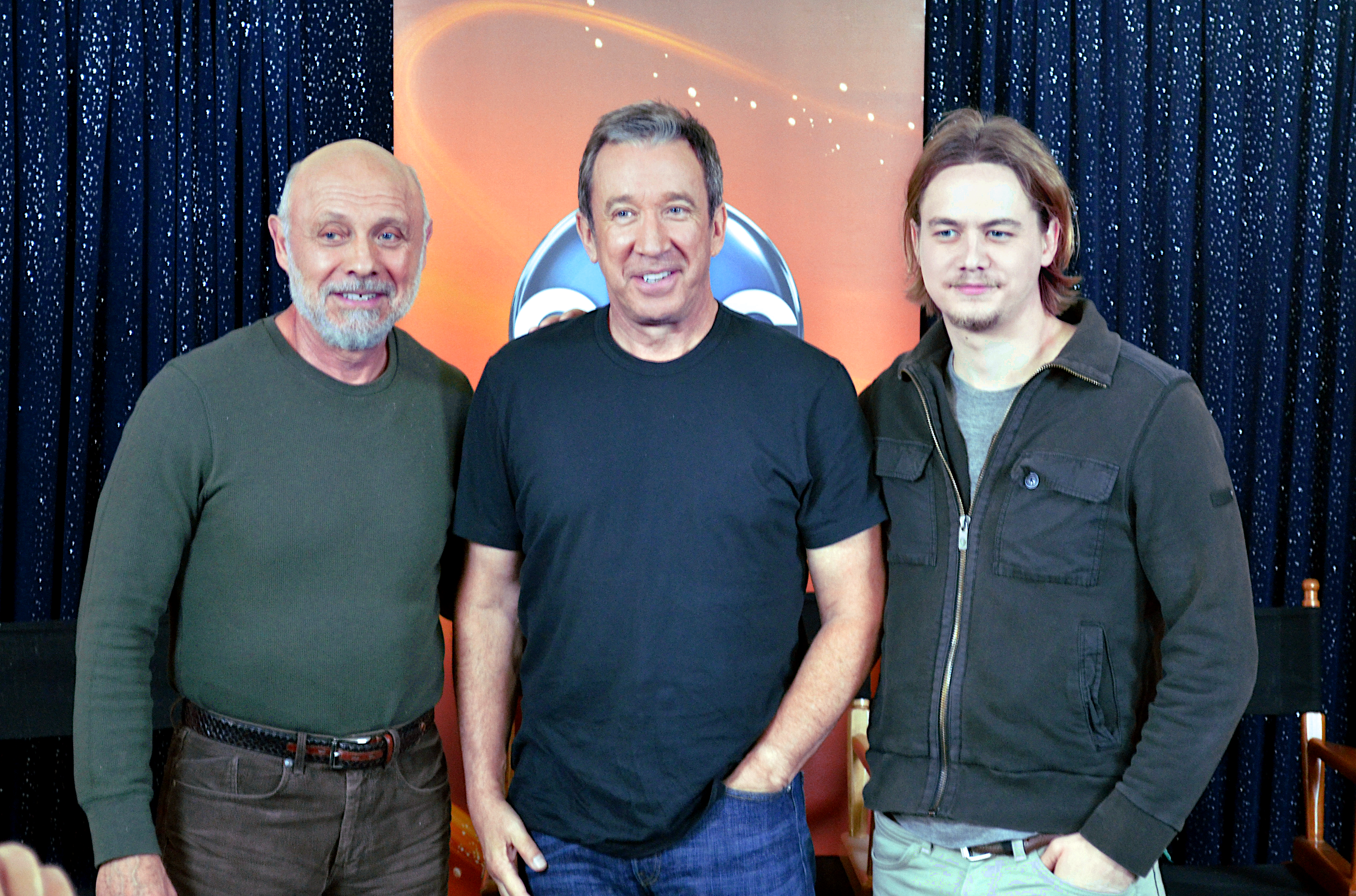
(L to R) Last Man Standing stars Héctor Elizondo, Tim Allen and Christoph Sanders

On review aggregation website Rotten Tomatoes, season one holds an approval rating of 14% based on 37 reviews, and the average rating is 4.14/10. The same site's critical consensus for the season reads, "Last Man Standing is a thoroughly middling sitcom relying on jokes that feel alternately dated or hostile." On Metacritic, the season has a weighted average score of 33 out of 100, based on 24 critics, indicating "generally unfavorable reviews".

The Hollywood Reporter called the series "a predictable sitcom with a stupid premise and bad acting". Los Angeles Times: "The jokes and plots have been efficiently constructed, but most have no traction; they slide right off you, and the characters themselves seem disconnected from one another." Entertainment Weekly offered a slightly more favorable review of the show: "When I look at the now-rounded softness of Tim Allen, and note once again how his sandpaper voice contrasts winningly with his hopeful eyes, it's impossible to plunge a shiv into this series."

Season two of the series holds an approval rating of 40% on Rotten Tomatoes. Entertainment Weekly commented: "I think it's time the folks involved with Last take a closer look at All in the Family, in which the prejudice was built around real jokes." The A.V. Club's Emily VanDerWerff wrote: "The problem with Last Man Standing's attempts to go political is exemplified by the first scene of the season première, which remains one of the most uncomfortable scenes of television I've ever watched... doing its best to push buttons in the audience that don't need to be pushed, as if it thinks what made [Norman] Lear's sitcoms a success was the yelling or the mentions of social issues that people sometimes argued about." Philly.com wrote about season three: "The unlikely comeback vehicle for Tim Allen, Last Man Standing on ABC, is a thoroughly traditional, absolutely charming sitcom. [...] Last Man is both economical and efficient, getting excellent comic mileage out of the most marginal bit players."

Season seven holds an approval rating of 58% based on 12 reviews and an average rating of 5.34/10. The website's critical consensus reads, "Last Man Standing isn't the most realistic sitcom on the dial, but its idealistic representation of opposites living in harmony offers sorely needed hope during divided times." On Metacritic, the season has a weighted average score of 58 out of 100, based on 6 critics, indicating "mixed or average reviews".

A study conducted during the 2016 U.S. presidential election found that it was the tenth most popular show on television with Republicans.

=== Ratings ===
ABC's series premiere of Last Man Standing drew a 3.5 adults 18–49 rating. That was 9% better than the 3.2 adults 18–49 rating for the series premiere of No Ordinary Family in the same time-slot the previous year (which was two weeks earlier in the season). Season 2 of Last Man Standing premiered with a 2.0, down about 38% from its first-season premiere, but up about 18% from the previous season's finale. Ratings for the eighth season on Fox declined after the series moved to Thursday nights, competing with Young Sheldon (CBS) and Superstore (NBC). Despite the strong competition, Last Man Standing was still the highest-rated scripted comedy on Fox for the 2019–2020 season.

Season	Timeslot (ET)	Network	No. of episodes	Premiered			Ended			TV season	Rank	Viewers (million)	Live + DVR viewers
Season	Timeslot (ET)	Network	No. of episodes	Date	Premiere viewers (million)	Premiere 18–49 rating/share	Date	Finale viewers (million)	Finale 18–49 rating/share	TV season	Rank	Viewers (million)	Live + DVR viewers
1	Tuesday 8:00 pm	ABC	24	October 11, 2011	12.93	3.4/10	May 8, 2012	6.62	1.7/5	2011–12	50	9.12	9.76
2	Friday 8:00 pm	ABC	18	November 2, 2012	8.07	2.0/7	March 22, 2013	7.85	1.6/6	2012–13	53	7.93	8.34
3	Friday 8:00 pm	ABC	22	September 20, 2013	6.67	1.5/6	April 25, 2014	6.10	1.4/6	2013–14	58	7.17	7.92
4	Friday 8:00 pm	ABC	22	October 3, 2014	6.91	1.3/5	April 17, 2015	6.16	1.1/5	2014–15	60	8.18	8.52
5	Friday 8:00 pm	ABC	22	September 25, 2015	6.26	1.1/5	April 22, 2016	5.94	1.0/4	2015–16	56	7.96	—N/a
6	Friday 8:00 pm	ABC	22	September 23, 2016	5.95	1.1/5	March 31, 2017	6.06	1.1/5	2016–17	41	8.06	—N/a
7	Friday 8:00 pm	Fox	22	September 28, 2018	8.13	1.8/10	May 10, 2019	4.72	0.9/5	2018–19	40	8.23	—N/a
8	Thursday 8:00 pm	Fox	21	January 2, 2020	5.21	1.0/5	April 30, 2020	4.25	0.7/4	2019–20	57	6.40	—N/a
9	Thursday 9:30 pm (1−13, 21); Thursday 9:00 pm (14−20)	Fox	21	January 3, 2021	2.52	0.5/3	May 20, 2021	2.63	0.4/3	2020–21	65	4.60	—N/a

=== Awards and nominations ===
Last Man Standing was nominated for a 2012 People's Choice Award for "Favorite New TV Comedy", but lost to CBS's 2 Broke Girls.

Year	Association	Category	Nominee / episode	Outcome
2011	ASCAP Film and Television Music Awards	Top Television Series	Carl Thiel (composer)	Won
2012	People's Choice Awards	Favorite New TV Comedy	Last Man Standing	Nominated
2012	Kids' Choice Awards	Favorite TV Actor	Tim Allen	Nominated
2012	TV Guide Magazine's Fan Favorites Awards	Favorite Comeback	Tim Allen	Won
2012	Young Artist Awards	Best Performance in a TV Series (Comedy or Drama) – Supporting Young Actress	Kaitlyn Dever	Nominated
2013	Environmental Media Awards	Television Episodic Comedy	"Mother Fracker"	Won
2013	ASCAP Film and Television Music Awards	Top Television Series	Carl Thiel (composer)	Won
2014	Primetime Creative Arts Emmy Awards	Outstanding Cinematography For A Multi-Camera Series	Donald A. Morgan – "Eve's Boyfriend"	Nominated
2014	ASCAP Film and Television Music Awards	Top Television Series	Carl Thiel (composer)	Won
2014	MovieGuide Awards	Grace Award for Television	Willie Robertson	Won
2015	ASCAP Screen Music Awards	Top Television Series	Carl Thiel (composer)	Won
2016	Primetime Creative Arts Emmy Awards	Primetime Emmy Award for Outstanding Multi-Camera Picture Editing for a Comedy Series		Nominated
2017	Primetime Creative Arts Emmy Awards	Primetime Emmy Award for Outstanding Multi-Camera Picture Editing for a Comedy Series		Nominated
2021	Primetime Creative Arts Emmy Awards	Outstanding Cinematography for a Multi-Camera Series	Donald A. Morgan	Nominated
