= Terri Hoyos =

American actress

- Born: Teresa Victoria Hoyos; Los Angeles, California, U.S.
- Occupation: Actress
- Years active: 1984–present
- Children: 1
- Parent: Rodolfo Hoyos Jr. (father)

Teresa Victoria "Terri" Hoyos is an American actress and former makeup artist.

== Early life ==
Hoyos was born and raised in Los Angeles, California and is of Mexican descent and is the daughter of actor Rodolfo Hoyos Jr., aka Rodolfo Hoyos. In the 1980s, she began her career as a makeup artist, and later trained in acting at LACC Theatre Arts Academy.

== Career ==
Hoyos made her screen debut in 1984, with a small part in the film Crimes of Passion, and later had guest starring roles on Hill Street Blues, Gimme a Break!, Cheers, ER, Dharma & Greg, Frasier, NYPD Blue, Parks and Recreation, and Modern Family. She also had a recurring role as Rosa Valens in the CBS procedural Cold Case (2009–2010). She was a regular cast member on the Fox sitcom The Ortegas in 2003. The series was canceled before its debut. In 2014, she was cast in the ABC comedy series Cristela. In 2020, she appeared as Victor Salazar (Michael Cimino)'s grandmother Natalia in Love, Victor.

== Filmography ==
=== Film ===
Year	Title	Role	Notes
1984	Crimes of Passion	Group Member No.2	
1991	Howling VI: The Freaks	Towny #3	
1997	Clockwatchers	Female Executive	
1998	Bulworth	Reporter #3	
1999	Implicated	Charlotte	
1999	Soft Toilet Seats	The Gas Woman	
2001	Town & Country	Yolanda	
2003	A Man Apart	Mrs. Lucero	
2005	Sueño	Olga	
2021	Together Together	Dana	

=== Television ===
Year	Title	Role	Notes
1987	Hill Street Blues	Raina Vasquez	Episode: "City of Refuse"
1987	Hunter	Lupe	Episode: "Double Exposure"
1987	The Tortellis	Louise	Episode: "The Good Life"
1987	Cheers	Auction Bidder	Episode: "Bidding on the Boys"
1988	Buck James	Katie	Episode: "The Requiem"
1989	Head of the Class	Mrs. Borges	Episode: "Little Shop 'Til You Drop: Part 2"
1989	Hard Time on Planet Earth	Cashier	Episode: "Not in Our Stars"
1990	Molloy	Marguerita	2 episodes
1991	Brotherhood of the Gun	Rose	Television film; uncredited
1991	Married... with Children	Mrs. Garcia	Episode: "Lookin' for a Desk in All the Wrong Places"
1992	Indecency	Wanda	Television film
1994	My So-Called Life	Dr. Skolnick	Episode: "Pressure"
1995	Touched by an Angel	Mary Garcia	Episode: "The Driver"
1995	ER	Mrs. Corvalan	Episode: "The Secret Sharer"
1996	Almost Perfect	Officer Escalante	Episode: "Mind Games"
1996	Diagnosis: Murder	Diane	Episode: "Murder Can Be Murder"
1997	Knots Landing: Back to the Cul-de-Sac	Jean	2 episodes
1998	Dharma & Greg	Alba	Episode: "Valet Girl"
1999	Payne	Alejandra Valdez	Episode: "Sexual Intercom"
2000	Beverly Hills, 90210	Merritt	Episode: "Tainted Love"
2000	A Family in Crisis: The Elian Gonzales Story	N/A	Television film
2001	Popular	Salsa Instructor	Episode: "The Brain Game"
2001	Frasier	Hostess	Episode: "Cranes Go Caribbean"
2002	She's No Angel	Blanca	Television film
2002	MDs	Mrs. Davis	Episode: "Family Secrets"
2005	NYPD Blue	Aunt Sylvia	Episode: "Stratis Fear"
2005	Six Feet Under	Realtor	Episode: "Everyone's Waiting"
2005	Commander in Chief	Governor Maria Nuñez	Episode: "First Disaster"
2006	Lovespring International	Cleaning Lady	Episode: "Burke Makes a Friend"
2006	The Nine	Lucia Perez	Episode: "Brother's Keeper"
2006	Without a Trace	Dolores	Episode: "The Calm Before"
2006	Out of Practice	Carmen	Episode: "You Win Some, You Use Some"
2007	Crossing Jordan	Panel Chair	Episode: "33 Bullets"
2007	Standoff	Carol Wolfe	Episode: "Lie to Me"
2007	Monk	Maria Cordova	Episode: "Mr. Monk Is Up All Night"
2008	Everybody Hates Chris	Thrift Store Clerk	Episode: "Everybody Hates Mother's Day"
2008	Raising the Bar	Knife expert witness	Episode: "Guatemala Gulfstream"
2009	Hawthorne	Esther Ramos	Episode: "Yielding"
2009–2010	Cold Case	Rosa Valens	6 episodes
2010	The Deep End	Secretary	Episode: "Pilot"
2010–2011	Parks and Recreation	Rita Ludgate	2 episodes
2011	The Craigslist Killer	Sophie Flores	Television film
2011	Criminal Minds: Suspect Behavior	Medical Examiner	Episode: "See No Evil"
2011	Bones	Nicole Francuzzi	Episode: "The Pinocchio in the Planter"
2012	Modern Family	Abuela	Episode: "Baby on Board"
2014	Twisted	Elaine	Episode: "You're a Good Man, Charlie McBride"
2014	Chasing Life	Charlotte Morissey	Episode: "What to Expect When You're Expecting Chemo"
2014–2015	Cristela	Natalia	22 episodes
2015	Graceland	Teresa Arrabuena	2 episodes
2016	The Fosters	Judge Eloise Wagner	Episode: "Rehearsal"
2017	Rosewood	Izzy Vermundo	Episode: "Naegleria & Neighborhood Watch"
2017	Animal Kingdom	Ring Woman	Episode: "Treasure"
2018	Mom	Soledad	Episode: "Esta Loca and a Little Klingon"
2018	Young & Hungry	Abuelita	Episode: "Young & Magic"
2018	Grey's Anatomy	Flor's Abuela	Episode: "Flowers Grow Out Of My Grave"
2018–2025	9-1-1	Aunt Josephina	9 episodes
2020	Team Kaylie	Consuelo	Episode: "19 Is the New 15"
2020	Deputy	Carmen	2 episodes
2020	Love, Victor	Natalia Salazar	Episode: "Sweet Sixteen"
2021	S.W.A.T.	Mama Pina	Episode: "Safe House" S5-E8
2025	Lopez vs Lopez	Elsa Lopez	Recurring
