= Cristela =

American sitcom

- Genre: Sitcom
- Created by: Cristela Alonzo; Kevin Hench
- Starring: Cristela Alonzo; Maria Canals-Barrera; Carlos Ponce; Terri Hoyos; Andrew Leeds; Sam McMurray; Justine Lupe; Isabella Day; Jacob Guenther
- Theme music composer: Dave Thomas Jr.
- Composer: John Swihart
- Country of origin: United States
- Original language: English
- No. of seasons: 1
- No. of episodes: 22

Production
- Executive producers: Cristela Alonzo; Kevin Hench; Becky Clements; Marty Adelstein; Shawn Levy
- Camera setup: Film; Multi-camera
- Running time: 21–22 minutes
- Production companies: 21 Laps-Adelstein Productions; Hench in the Trench Productions; 20th Century Fox Television

Original release
- Network: ABC
- Release: October 10, 2014 – April 17, 2015

Cristela is an American multi-camera sitcom television series that aired from October 10, 2014, until April 17, 2015, on ABC. The series was created by stand-up comedian Cristela Alonzo, who also starred in and wrote for the series and served as an executive producer with co-creator Kevin Hench, Becky Clements, Marty Adelstein, and Shawn Levy for 20th Century Fox Television. This made her the first Latina to create, produce, write, and star in her own primetime comedy. The series was canceled by ABC on May 7, 2015.

== Synopsis ==
The series chronicles the life of Cristela Hernandez, a Mexican-American law school graduate living in Dallas, Texas, who must balance her chance to live the American Dream by working as an unpaid intern at a law firm with the concerns of her family, including her sister Daniela (who thinks she should get a paying job), her brother-in-law Felix (who thinks of her as a freeloader), and her mother Natalia (who wants her to settle down and marry). At work, she deals with her boss Trent Culpepper (who is prone to unintentional racist statements), his daughter Maddie (who could not care less about working, and is described by Cristela as a 'rich spoiled white girl'), and Josh (who is her love interest for the series).

== Cast ==
=== Main cast ===
- Cristela Alonzo as Cristela Hernandez, a sassy and sarcastic aspiring attorney who lives with her sister and brother-in-law
- Maria Canals-Barrera as Daniela Gonzalez (née Hernandez), Cristela's over-the-top, vain sister who is the manager of a call center
- Carlos Ponce as Felix Gonzalez, Cristela's brother-in-law, married to Daniela, Cristela's sister
- Terri Hoyos as Natalia Hernandez, Cristela's and Daniela's critical, old-fashioned mother who constantly refers to growing up in poverty in a Mexican village
- Andrew Leeds as Josh, Cristela's competitive co-worker from a privileged background, and her possible love interest
- Sam McMurray as Trent Culpepper, Cristela's greedy boss who frequently makes racist comments
- Justine Lupe as Maddie Culpepper, Trent's materialistic daughter and Cristela's ditzy co-worker
- Isabella Day as Isabella Gonzalez, Felix and Daniela's daughter
- Jacob Guenther as Henry Gonzalez, Felix and Daniela's son

=== Recurring cast ===
- Gabriel Iglesias as Alberto, Felix's annoying cousin and co-worker who is in love with Cristela (much to her dismay)
- Adam Shapiro as Ben Buckner, an associate who works with Cristela and later becomes interested in her romantically

==== Characters mentioned but not seen ====
- Juanita Canales, the family's neighbor; Natalia and Juanita are always trying to one-up each other, and Natalia openly expresses hatred for Juanita to the family.
- Mr. Hernandez, Cristela, Daniela, and Eddie's father, and Natalia's estranged husband, who left the family immediately after Cristela was born.

=== Guest stars ===
- Mark Cuban as himself
- Valente Rodriguez as Eduardo "Eddie" Hernandez, Cristela and Daniela's brother who works in Oklahoma. He is Natalia's favorite child, due to him being her only son.
- Roseanne Barr as Veronica Culpepper (née Price), Trent's estranged third wife who is also a lawyer. She openly dislikes her husband, but becomes a friend of Cristela.
- Tim Allen as Mike Baxter, from Last Man Standing
- Héctor Elizondo as Ed Alzate, from Last Man Standing

== Production ==
In 2013, Alonzo created her own semi-autobiographical comedy pilot Cristela for ABC. It was not greenlit as a part of the 2013–14 television season, but on February 26, 2014, ABC ordered another pilot presentation, and filmed a full-length pilot on the stage of Last Man Standing, where it got a strong testing from the audience. On May 10, 2014, ABC picked up the pilot to series for the 2014–15 television season.

On November 24, 2014, Cristela was picked up for a full season.

=== Crossover with Last Man Standing ===
On February 9, 2015, ABC announced that Cristela would cross over with fellow ABC Friday night sitcom Last Man Standing, with that show's stars Tim Allen and Héctor Elizondo appearing in the episode "Last Goose Standing".

=== Cancellation ===
The series was canceled by ABC on May 7, 2015. ABC cited the show's live ratings as the reason for its cancellation.

== Episodes ==
No.	Title	Directed by	Written by	Original release date	Prod. code	U.S. viewers (millions)
1	"Pilot"	John Pasquin	Cristela Alonzo & Kevin Hench	October 10, 2014	1AYC01	6.51
Cristela applies for an unpaid legal internship, much to the chagrin of her family. Meanwhile, Daniela and Felix get mad at Cristela for secretly signing up Izzy for soccer instead of cheerleading.
2	"Soul Mates"	Gerry Cohen	Kevin Abbott & Cristela Alonzo	October 17, 2014	1AYC04	5.99
Daniela signs up Cristela for a dating site, much to Cristela's annoyance. When she gets popular on the site, she reluctantly goes on a date with an unexpected suitor that turns out to be Alberto. Meanwhile, Felix tries to convince Daniela he's romantic and sensitive.
3	"Mr. Felix and Ms. Daniela"	Victor Gonzalez	Emilia Serrano	October 24, 2014	1AYC06	5.04
Tensions heat up between Cristela and Daniela, after Daniela's rich friend mistakes Cristela as the nanny and Daniela goes along with it. Meanwhile, Alberto tries to get closer to Cristela by putting her new bed together.
4	"Hall-Oates-Ween"	John Pasquin	Kay Cannon	October 31, 2014	1AYC03	5.40
On Halloween, Cristela wants to demonstrate her party-planning skills for Mr. Culpepper. After Cristela fails to convince Josh, Maddie agrees to be "Hall" to Cristela's "Oates", but Maddie unwittingly ruins it. Meanwhile, Natalia's hatred of Halloween makes her celebrate the Day of the Dead, and ironically, her stories make her the most popular Halloween attraction in the neighborhood.
5	"Super Fan"	Victor Gonzalez	Cristela Alonzo & Kevin Hench	November 7, 2014	1AYC07	4.95
It is performance review time, and Trent lets it be known that a junior associate position may be opening for one of his interns if they can impress his "shark" client, which turns out to be Dallas Mavericks owner Mark Cuban. As an avid sports fan, Cristela has an advantage over the clueless Josh, but she helps Josh get closer to Mark anyway. Also, Cristela teaches Izzy a lesson about material possessions and fitting in.
6	"Equal Pay"	John Pasquin	Peter Murrieta	November 14, 2014	1AYC02	5.11
While helping with a case at work about unequal pay for women, Cristela finds out Daniela has been making more money than Felix for the last 5 years and has been hiding it from him. When Cristela accidentally reveals the secret, this causes a rift between all three of them.
7	"Enter Singing"	Gail Mancuso	Dana Gould	November 21, 2014	1AYC08	5.19
Cristela tries to get Henry into American culture, and the perfect opportunity arises when Maddie has extra box seat tickets to see West Side Story. But Felix refuses to let his son go, fearing Henry will get used to things he can't provide. At work, Trent learns that his firm is at the bottom of the diversity rankings, so he orders Josh to take photos of various staff with Cristela in every one of them.
8	"Floor Favor"	Gail Mancuso	Julius Sharpe	December 5, 2014	1AYC09	4.64
Trent wants a new floor for his office, and Cristela reluctantly recommends Felix, knowing she'll have to deal with her brother-in-law and Alberto being in the office for a couple of days. However, she becomes jealous when they actually become friends with Trent and begin to boss her around. At home, Daniela helps a clueless Natalia learn about the internet so she can communicate with a relative in Mexico.
9	"It's Not About the Tamales"	John Pasquin	Cristela Alonzo	December 12, 2014	1AYC12	4.45
It's Christmas time and Cristela is looking forward to the tradition of making tamales with her mom and sister. Cristela's brother Eddie (Valente Rodriguez) visits after returning from a job out of state. Eddie is a source of angst for Cristela and Daniela, as he is Natalia's favorite and she constantly compares them to him. Josh mistakes a joke for an earnest invitation, and ends up unknowingly crashing the family tamale party. Despite some chaos, Josh and Cristela both agree they enjoy seeing each other outside of work. Meanwhile, Natalia shares her disappointment with changes made to the family's holiday traditions, while Josh helps Cristela see what is at the heart of her mother's sadness.
10	"Veronica"	Victor Gonzalez	Kevin Abbott & Pat Bullard	January 9, 2015	1AYC11	6.61
Trent's estranged third wife Veronica (Roseanne Barr), also an attorney, arrives at the office and the two argue over an upcoming case. Trent sends Cristela to talk with Veronica about settling out of court, but Veronica instead surprises Cristela and tests her loyalty to Trent by offering her a job. After some hurtful comments made by Trent, Cristela decides to take Veronica's offer, causing Trent to reluctantly admit that he likes and respects Cristela, and doesn't want her to leave. Meanwhile, Henry and Izzy face off to see who can sell the most candy bars for a school fundraiser.
11	"Dead Arm"	Gail Mancuso	Peter Murrieta	January 16, 2015	1AYC13	5.10
Cristela and Daniela become concerned when Izzy is being bullied at school. When it actually turns out Izzy is doing the bullying, however, the family members try to figure out where she learned the behavior. In the end, it turns out no one was actually being bullied; they were playing a game she learned from Felix and Alberto. At work, both Maddie and Josh feel that Cristela "bullies" them with her sarcastic humor.
12	"Hypertension"	Gail Mancuso	Kevin Abbott & Pat Bullard	January 30, 2015	1AYC14	5.69
Daniela wants Cristela to get back into exercising, because high blood pressure runs in the family. When Daniela and Cristela get their blood pressure checked, it turns out Daniela is the one whose pressure reading is high. Daniela admits she really just wanted Cristela to lose weight in order to attract a good man. At work, Josh tries to steal a paying assignment from Cristela that requires knowledge of CPR, despite the fact that Cristela is trained in CPR and Josh is not. Knowing Cristela needs the position more than Josh, Maddie has some fun at Josh's expense to teach him a lesson.
13	"Mexican Mona Lisa"	John Pasquin	Peter Murrieta	February 6, 2015	1AYC10	5.49
Cristela is happy to be getting paid as Trent's temporary assistant when his elderly receptionist needs a leave of absence, but she must endure teasing from Josh. When Natalia misses a call from the doctor following her appointment, Cristela and Daniela fear something bad is happening to her. Natalia procrastinates returning the doctor's call, finally admitting she never went to her appointment.
14	"Marriage, Counselor"	Ted Wass	Eben Russell	February 20, 2015	1AYC17	5.05
Veronica returns as she and Trent head closer to a divorce. When it is revealed the pre-nups were never signed, Trent has Cristela try to get Veronica to sign them, knowing the two have grown close. However, Veronica grudgingly reveals she still has feelings for Trent and doesn't want a divorce. When Trent reveals he doesn't either, Cristela plays marriage counselor. Meanwhile, Daniela learns that Felix lied about dumping his ex-girlfriend Lucia for her (it was Lucia who dumped him), and she refuses to talk to her husband.
15	"Gifted and Talented"	Robbie Countryman	Kevin Hench	February 27, 2015	1AYC16	5.66
Cristela is rooting for Izzy to get into the Gifted and Talented school program. Cristela is mainly rooting for her because she did not get into the program as a child. However, in order to spare Henry's feelings because he also did not get in, Izzy deliberately fails the exam. After Natalia reveals a secret about Cristela's exam, tensions flare between the two. Meanwhile, Maddie gets into another car accident, so Trent punishes his daughter by making her work in the mail room, which proves to be a challenge.
16	"Confirmation"	Robbie Countryman	Kay Cannon	March 13, 2015	1AYC15	5.04
With Henry's confirmation coming up, Cristela promises Daniela she will be his sponsor. While at work, Maddie posts an online video with Trent in the background making an apparent racist comment toward Cristela. Cristela waves it off as part of their banter, and says she'll support Trent at a press conference he has called to clear the air. But her loyalty is tested when the press conference is scheduled at the same time as Henry's confirmation.
17	"Fifteen-Something"	Ted Wass	Cristela Alonzo	March 20, 2015	1AYC18	5.27
The family's neighbor and Natalia's nemesis, Juanita Canales, invites them to her granddaughter's quinceanera and Natalia wants to impress everybody by bringing in different aspects of the family. Natalia pushes a reluctant Cristela into bringing Josh to the dance, feeling it's a sign of status for Cristela to be dating a white man. When Juanita's daughter "steals" Josh, Cristela becomes jealous. Meanwhile, Daniela is mad because she feels Felix has become a better dancer than her.
18	"Latino 101"	Ted Wass	Peter Murrieta	March 27, 2015	1AYC19	4.46
When Trent represents a landlord who is accused of refusing to rent to minorities, he picks Cristela to sit at his table to show there is a minority on his side. However, Cristela had hoped she truly earned the seat at the table, and must decide to use her minority status as an advantage or not. Meanwhile, Daniela becomes suspicious when Alberto suddenly begins bonding with Natalia.
19	"Great Expectations"	John Pasquin	Daley Haggar	March 27, 2015	1AYC05	4.18
Cristela has to come up with a creative way to motivate Maddie after Trent says he had hoped Cristela's work ethic would have rubbed off on his daughter by now. Meanwhile, the kids manipulate Felix while Daniela is on a field trip, and Natalia competes with Juanita in a church baking contest.
20	"Last Goose Standing"	Ted Wass	D.J. Ryan & Aaron Serna	April 3, 2015	1AYC20	5.48
Mike Baxter (Tim Allen) and Ed Alzate (Héctor Elizondo) of the Outdoor Man stores seek legal help to expand the store's gun range in Dallas. Trent brings Cristela along and instructs her to try and gain favor with the zoning commissioner, who is an environmentalist. When they find a way to both save the environment and get the zoning changed, Ben takes Cristela out to dinner to commemorate their success on the case. Maddie convinces Cristela it might be a date, but Ben says it is just a celebration dinner. Ben later asks Cristela to go on a "real" date.
21	"Village Mode"	Bob Koherr	Pat Bullard & Peter Murrieta	April 10, 2015	1AYC21	5.13
Hours away from taking the bar exam, Cristela, Maddie and Josh handle the stress differently. Meanwhile, Daniela loses her job so Natalia demands that Cristela get a job at the hair salon and begins going into "Village (survival) Mode". Cristela caves to Natalia, deciding to help out her family and wait another six months to take the exam, but Josh comes to the home and, surprisingly, stands up to Natalia.
22	"Movin' On Up"	Ted Wass	Kevin Abbott	April 17, 2015	1AYC22	4.77
The results of everyone's bar exams are revealed. Cristela and Maddie (much to everyone's surprise) passed; Josh, unfortunately, did not pass. Trent offers Cristela a position at the firm with the option to hire an assistant. Josh happily takes the role of Cristela's secretary in order to avoid having to move back with his parents. Cristela ecstatically races home with the exciting news, but Daniela has other ideas about how Cristela should spend her new life.

== Reception ==
=== Critical response ===
The series started with mixed reviews from critics despite praise for Alonzo's performance. On Rotten Tomatoes, Cristela has a rating of 52%, based on 31 reviews, with the site's critical consensus reading, "Though Cristela Alonzo has a pleasing energy, Cristela's disappointing supporting cast and uneven writing ruin the show's attempts at humor." Metacritic gave the show a score of 61 out of 100, based on 18 critics, indicating "generally favorable review".

However, as the season progressed, Cristela began earning more positive reviews before it was cancelled for low ratings.

=== Ratings ===
Although the series initially premiered to decent ratings, ratings gradually declined throughout the season, resulting in its cancellation.

==== Season overview ====
Season	Timeslot (ET)	Episodes	Premiered		Ended		TV Season	Rank	Viewers (in millions)
Season	Timeslot (ET)	Episodes	Date	Premiere Viewers (in millions)	Date	Finale Viewers (in millions)	TV Season	Rank	Viewers (in millions)
1	Friday 8:30 pm	22	October 10, 2014	6.51	April 17, 2015	4.77	2014-15	95	5.23

==== By episode ====
No.	Title	Air date	Rating/share (18–49)	Viewers (millions)
1	"Pilot"	October 10, 2014	1.3/5	6.51
2	"Soul Mates"	October 17, 2014	1.2/4	5.99
3	"Mr. Felix and Ms. Daniela"	October 24, 2014	1.0/4	5.04
4	"Hall-Oates-Ween"	October 31, 2014	1.0/4	5.40
5	"Super Fan"	November 7, 2014	1.0/4	4.95
6	"Equal Pay"	November 14, 2014	1.1/4	5.11
7	"Enter Singing"	November 21, 2014	1.0/4	5.19
8	"Floor Favor"	December 5, 2014	0.9/3	4.64
9	"It's Not About the Tamales"	December 12, 2014	0.8/3	4.45
10	"Veronica"	January 9, 2015	1.3/4	6.61
11	"Dead Arm"	January 16, 2015	1.1/4	5.10
12	"Hypertension"	January 30, 2015	1.0/4	5.69
13	"Mexican Mona Lisa"	February 6, 2015	1.0/4	5.49
14	"Marriage, Counselor"	February 20, 2015	0.9/3	5.05
15	"Gifted and Talented"	February 27, 2015	1.0/4	5.66
16	"Confirmation"	March 13, 2015	0.9/3	5.04
17	"Fifteen–Something"	March 20, 2015	1.0/4	5.27
18	"Latino 101"	March 27, 2015	0.8/3	4.46
19	"Great Expectations"	March 27, 2015	0.8/3	4.18
20	"Last Goose Standing"	April 3, 2015	1.0/3	5.48
21	"Village Mode"	April 10, 2015	1.0/4	5.13
22	"Movin' On Up"	April 17, 2015	0.9/4	4.77

== Broadcast ==
In Australia, Cristela premiered on Fox8 on February 1, 2015.

In Italy, Cristela premiered on Fox Comedy September 5, 2015.
