= Kevin Hench =

American screenwriter, television producer, television writer and columnist

Kevin Hench is an American screenwriter, television producer, television writer and columnist for foxsports.com.

Hench is a frequent collaborator with comedian Adam Carolla, having co-written and co-produced the 2007 film The Hammer and two network TV pilots starring Carolla. Hench was also a producer on Carolla's series The Man Show and Too Late with Adam Carolla. With retired NBA player John Salley, Hench hosted a podcast called Spider and the Henchman for Carolla's ACE Broadcasting Network.

Hench appears regularly on the NPR sports show Only A Game and to discuss Boston-area sports on The Bill Simmons Podcast. He has also appeared on the ESPN show Jim Rome Is Burning.

Hench is an alumnus of the University of Vermont. He resides in Los Angeles with his wife, actress Heather Juergensen.
