= Starting Over Again =

Starting Over Again may refer to:

== Film ==
- Starting Over Again (2014 film), a Filipino romantic comedy
- Starting Over Again (2015 film), an Italian documentary

== Music ==
- Starting Over Again (album), a 2008 album by Sheryn Regis
- "Starting Over Again" (Natalie Cole song), recorded by Dionne Warwick, 1981 and Natalie Cole, 1989
- "Starting Over Again" (Donna Summer song), recorded by Dolly Parton, 1980, and Reba McEntire, 1995
- "Starting Over Again" (Steve Wariner song), a 1986 song by Steve Wariner

== Television ==
- "Starting Over...Again", Good Witch season 1, episodes 1–2 (2015)
- "Starting Over Again", Love Before Sunrise episode 41 (2023)
- "Starting Over Again", Owen Marshall, Counselor at Law season 2, episode 12 (1972)
- "Starting Over Again", The Ranch season 3, episode 1 (2018)

== See also ==
- Starting All Over Again
- Starting Out (disambiguation)
- Starting Over (disambiguation)
