= Starting Over =

Starting Over may refer to:

== Music ==
- Starting Over (Chris Stapleton album)
  - "Starting Over" (Chris Stapleton song), the title track
- Starting Over (Raspberries album), and a song from that album
  - "Starting Over" (Raspberries song), the title track
- Starting Over (Reba McEntire album)
- Starting Over (Speed album), and a song from that album
- Starting Over (Edison Glass EP)
- Starting Over (La Toya Jackson EP), 2011
- "Starting Over" (Tammy Wynette song), a 1980 song released as a single by Tammy Wynette
- "(Just Like) Starting Over", a song by John Lennon
- "Starting Over", a song from The Crystal Method's Legion of Boom
- "Starting Over", a song from Jennifer Lopez's album Love?
- "Starting Over" (Killswitch Engage song)
- "Starting Over", a song from Audio Adrenaline's Until My Heart Caves In
- "Starting Over", a song from Korn's untitled album
- "Starting Over", a song from Robbie Seay Band's Give Yourself Away
- "Starting Over", a song from Saliva's Blood Stained Love Story
- "Starting Over", a song from Slave's Stone Jam
- "Starting Over", a song from Strawbs' Heartbreak Hill

== Film and television ==
- Starting Over (1979 film), a 1979 American comedy-drama film starring Burt Reynolds
- Starting Over (2007 film), a 2007 Scottish romantic drama television film based on a Robin Pilcher novel
- Starting Over (TV series), a 2003 American daytime reality television series
- "1979–1980 Starting Over", The Century: America's Time episode 13 (1999)
- "Starting Over", 9-1-1 season 5, episode 18 (2022)
- "Starting Over", 9 to 5 season 5, episode 6 (1987)
- "Starting Over", All of Us season 3, episode 1 (2005)
- "Starting Over", All Saints season 12, episode 19 (2009)
- "Starting Over", American Dreams season 3, episode 13 (2005)
- "Starting Over", Baby Talk season 2, episode 1 (1991)
- "Starting Over", Casualty series 15, episode 12 (2000)
- "Starting Over", Casualty series 25, episode 31 (2011)
- "Starting Over", Cedar Cove season 2, episode 5 (2014)
- "Starting Over", Dallas (1978) season 5, episode 10 (1981)
- "Starting Over", The Detectives (2018) season 3, episode 3 (2020)
- "Starting Over", DietTribe season 2, episode 6 (2009)
- "Starting Over", Dirty Soap episode 1 (2011)
- "Starting Over", DogTown season 3, episode 1 (2009)
- "Starting Over", Dr. Quinn, Medicine Woman season 5, episode 23 (1997)
- "Starting Over", Eight Is Enough season 5, episode 20 (1981)
- "Starting Over", The Exes season 3, episode 15 (2014)
- "Starting Over", Falcon Beach season 1, episode 1 (2006)
- "Starting Over", Family (1976) season 4, episode 1 (1978)
- "Starting Over", Family Ties season 5, episode 2 (1986)
- "Starting Over", Go Girls season 2, episode 1 (2010)
- "Starting Over", High Incident season 2, episode 21 (1997)
- "Starting Over", High Tide season 3, episode 1 (1996)
- "Starting Over", Holby City series 4, episode 6 (2001)
- "Starting Over", The Love Boat season 8, episode 9b (1984)
- "Starting Over", NCIS season 19, episode 17 (2022)
- "Starting Over", Neon Rider season 1, episode 10 (1990)
- "Starting Over", Niña Niño episodes 84 (2021)
- "Starting Over", The Real World Homecoming: New York episode 4 (2021)
- "Starting Over", The Royal series 6, episode 7 (2007)
- "Starting Over", The Single Guy season 2, episode 13 (1997)
- "Starting Over", Spin City season 1, episode 14 (1997)
- "Starting Over", Teen Mom UK series 5, episode 1 (2019)
- "Starting Over", The Trials of Rosie O'Neill season 1, episode 1 (1990)

== Literature ==
- Starting Over, a 1973 novel by Dan Wakefield; basis for the 1979 film
- Starting Over, a 1986 novel by Francine Pascal; the 33th installment in the Sweet Valley High series
- Starting Over, a 1991 novel by Kathy Clark
- Gen¹³: Starting Over, a 1999 collected edition of the first seven issues of Gen¹³ (vol. 2), a WildStorm comic book series
- Starting Over, a 2001 novel by Penny Jordan; the tenth installment in The Perfect Crightons series
- Starting Over, a 2002 novel by Robin Pilcher; basis for the 2007 TV film
- Starting Over, a 2007 novel by Cathy Hopkins; the second installment in the Cinnamon Girl series
- Starting Over (autobiography), a 2011 autobiography by La Toya Jackson

== See also ==
- Starting All Over Again
- Starting Out (disambiguation)
- Starting Over Again (disambiguation)
