= Starting Out (disambiguation) =

Starting Out may refer to:

- Starting Out, an Australian television soap opera made for the Nine Network by the Reg Grundy Organisation in 1983
- Starting Out (British television series), seven series for schools made by ATV between 1973 and 1992
- Starting Out, a British television series created by Maurice Gran and Laurence Marks in 1999 which ran for eight episodes
- "Starting Out", a song by The Screaming Jets from the album All for One, 1991
- "Startin' Out", a song by Moka Only from the album Magickal Weirdness, 2015

== See also ==
- Starting All Over Again
- Starting Over (disambiguation)
- Starting Over Again (disambiguation)
