= The Ranch =

2016 American sitcom

- Genre: Sitcom; Comedy drama
- Created by: Don Reo; Jim Patterson
- Directed by: David Trainer
- Starring: Ashton Kutcher; Danny Masterson; Debra Winger; Sam Elliott; Elisha Cuthbert
- Opening theme: "Mammas Don't Let Your Babies Grow Up to Be Cowboys" by Lukas Nelson and Shooter Jennings
- Country of origin: United States
- Original language: English
- No. of seasons: 4 (8 parts)
- No. of episodes: 80 (list of episodes)

Production
- Executive producers: Don Reo; Jim Patterson; Ashton Kutcher; Danny Masterson; Jane Wiseman; Blair Fetter; Andy Weil; Jerry Anglin
- Producers: Jamie Rhonheimer; Steve Tompkins; Sam Elliott
- Cinematography: Donald A. Morgan
- Editor: Michael Karlich
- Camera setup: Multi-camera
- Running time: 25–35 minutes
- Production company: Ranch Hand Productions

Original release
- Network: Netflix
- Release: April 1, 2016 – January 24, 2020

The Ranch is an American television sitcom created by Don Reo and Jim Patterson. It starred Ashton Kutcher and Danny Masterson (who previously co-starred on That '70s Show) as brothers Colt and Rooster Bennett, respectively, who help run the Colorado cattle ranch owned by their father Beau (Sam Elliott). It also starred Debra Winger as their mother Maggie, a local bar owner, and Elisha Cuthbert as Colt's love interest Abby, a local schoolteacher. Other cast members from That '70s Show who had recurring roles included Wilmer Valderrama, Kurtwood Smith and Debra Jo Rupp. It debuted in 2016 on Netflix and ran for four seasons in eight parts.

Each season consists of 20 episodes broken up into two parts, each containing 10 episodes, which are approximately 30 minutes in length. All episodes are named after American country music songs.

== Premise ==
The show takes place on Iron River Ranch, near the fictitious small town of Garrison, Colorado (population 512, as displayed on a sign in the opening credits). Dialogue places the town in southwestern Colorado (near the real town of Ouray, Colorado), about a six hour drive from Denver. The series details the life of the Bennetts, a dysfunctional family consisting of brothers Colt and Rooster, their father Beau, and their mother Maggie who owns the local bar.

== Cast ==
=== Main ===
- Ashton Kutcher as Colt Reagan Bennett, a former star quarterback for his high school football team who returns to his hometown after a fifteen-year absence to help his father and older brother on their family ranch while waiting for a tryout with a new semi-pro team in Denver. In the first episode, Colt reveals that he was the third-string quarterback for the Florida State team that won the National Championship in 1999. He pursued a professional career with little success, never finding regular playing time or stardom even on semi-pro teams, but hanging on in backup roles and on practice squads. Colt is frequently the butt of jokes, particularly when it comes to his lack of ranching skills, sub-par intelligence, and unsuccessful pro football career. He is a heavy drinker and has a habit of not using common sense, often acting before he thinks, but he is friendly and cares about other people deep down. Based on his various T-shirts and dialogue, it's implied Colt has played for the Barcelona Dragons, San Jose SaberCats, Spokane Shock, Orlando Predators, Nebraska Danger, Sioux City Bandits, Iowa Barnstormers, Green Bay Blizzard, Minnesota Axemen, Portland Forest Dragons and Philadelphia Soul. Dialogue and team gear also indicate that he was a member of teams in Canada, notably the Ottawa Redblacks and fictional Saskatoon Cold ("Like the Miami Heat... only cold"). He has also played on teams in Alaska and was a member of the Buffalo Bills practice squad. He later marries Abby, his high school sweetheart, and they become the parents of a daughter they name Peyton.
- Danny Masterson as Jameson "Rooster" Ford Bennett (seasons 1–3), Colt's older brother. He has lived and worked on the ranch since Colt left to follow his football career, at times showing a bitter attitude for accepting the responsibility while Colt pursued his dream. Despite living in Colt's shadow, he is far more competent on the ranch and a more rational thinker. He has, however, been just as immature as Colt, drinking too much and slacking off. In the first half of part 5, Rooster gets into a rivalry with his ex-girlfriend Mary's intimidating boyfriend Nick, and in the second episode of Part 6, it is discovered that Rooster's motorcycle went off the side of a dangerous road; he is missing and presumed dead.
- Debra Winger as Margeret "Maggie" Bennett, owner of Maggie's bar, and Colt and Rooster's mother. Maggie is at first separated and later divorced from Beau and lives in a trailer behind the bar she owns. Maggie is a free-thinker, an environmentalist, and an avid marijuana smoker. Much more patient and laid-back than Beau, Colt and Rooster often seek her company and advice on how to deal with problems, especially those concerning Beau.
- Sam Elliott as Beau Roosevelt Bennett, Maggie's ex-husband, and Colt and Rooster's father. A Vietnam War veteran, he has worked the ranch since returning from the war and taking it over after his father died. He is a curmudgeon, constantly annoyed with everyone and everything. He has a strained relationship with Rooster and Colt. He hates modern amenities and is easily angered by Colt and Rooster's antics. Beau appears to be a Republican with a soft-spot for Ronald Reagan but at times seems to despise all politicians regardless of affiliation.
- Elisha Cuthbert as Abby Phillips-Bennett (seasons 2–4; recurring, season 1), a Garrison High School history teacher and Colt's high school sweetheart. As the series begins, Abby has been in a five-year relationship with Kenny Ballard and briefly becomes engaged to him. As the series progresses, she breaks off her engagement to Kenny to reconnect with Colt, ultimately marrying Colt and having a baby girl, Peyton Margaret, with him.

=== Recurring ===
- Barry Corbin as Dale Rivers, a hearing-impaired veterinarian and close friend of Beau's
- Grady Lee Richmond as Hank McGinty, a regular Maggie's patron; also brother to Father McGinty
- Bret Harrison as Kenny Ballard, a Courtyard by Marriott manager, former classmate of Colt and Abby, and Abby's ex-fiancé
- Megyn Price as Mary Roth, a Cracker Barrel waitress and Rooster's love interest; she later has a relationship with Luke after Rooster disappears
- Kelli Goss as Heather Roth, Mary's younger daughter and Colt's brief love interest
- Molly McCook as Darlene Roth, Mary's older daughter
- Kathy Baker as Joanne, Beau's girlfriend (and later wife) following his divorce, and Mary's coworker at the Cracker Barrel
- Ethan Suplee as "Beer Pong" Billy Tompkins, a Sheriff's Deputy, and high school friend of Colt and Rooster's
- Justin Mooney as Deputy Wilkerson, a former schoolmate of Colt and Rooster's with whom Colt has an antagonistic rapport
- Aimee Teegarden as Nikki, Heather's friend and Billy's fiancée
- Chasty Ballesteros as Tanya Showers, a weather reporter and Kenny's girlfriend following his breakup with Abby
- Laura Vallejo as Maria, a Maggie's waitress
- Sharon Lawrence as Brenda Sanders, a widowed hairdresser who befriended Beau when he and Maggie separated
- Dawan Owens as Rich, a Neumann's Hill employee who is briefly Rooster's supervisor
- Maggie Lawson as Jen, an engineer who wants to build a pipeline underneath the Bennett Ranch and Rooster's brief love interest
- Wendie Malick as Lisa Neumann, owner of the Neumann's Hill ranching corporation
- Dax Shepard as Luke Matthews, the son of Beau's late brother Greg who arrives after Rooster's disappearance
- Stephen Saux as Mike, a motel manager, first seen at the Thomas Rhett concert
- Van Epperson as Father McGinty, a Priest who performs the wedding ceremony for Beau and Joanne and Peyton's baptism; also brother to Hank McGinty
- Travis Case as Toby Henderson, Colt's high school classmate, who runs the neighboring Henderson Ranch
- Josh Burrow as Nick, Mary's abusive ex-husband
- Casey Sander as Roger Hollister, Colt's neighboring rancher

=== Special guests ===
- Jon Cryer as Bill Jensen (seasons 1–2), a loan officer and former high school football referee
- Wilmer Valderrama as Umberto (seasons 1–2), a former Iron River ranch hand
- Martin Mull as Jerry, Maggie's sometimes acid-tripping attorney
- John Amos as Ed Bishop (seasons 1–2), a longtime family friend of the Bennetts and a Neumann's Hill employee
- Thomas F. Wilson as Coach Fitzgerald (season 1), the Garrison High School head football coach
- Debra Jo Rupp as Janice Phillips (seasons 2–4), Abby's mother
- Jim Beaver as Chuck Phillips (seasons 2–4), Abby's father
- Conchata Ferrell as Shirley (season 2)
- Lou Diamond Phillips as Clint (season 2), a traveling musician attracted to Maggie
- Kurtwood Smith as Sam Peterson (seasons 2–4), neighbor of the Iron River Ranch who sells his ranch to Colt and Rooster
- Nancy Travis as Karen (season 3), Maggie's estranged sister
- Joe Firstman, Pearl Charles, Kurt Neumann, Bukka Allen, Sam Hawksley and Thomas Rhett all make cameo appearances

Valderrama, Rupp and Smith had all previously worked together on That 70's Show, alongside Kutcher and Masterson.

Cryer, Ferrell and Lawson had all previously worked together on Two and a Half Men, alongside Kutcher.

== Episodes ==
Part	Season	Episodes	Originally released
1	1	10	April 1, 2016
2	1	10	October 7, 2016
3	2	10	June 16, 2017
4	2	10	December 15, 2017
5	3	10	June 15, 2018
6	3	10	December 7, 2018
7	4	10	September 13, 2019
8	4	10	January 24, 2020

== Release ==
The first ten episodes premiered on April 1, 2016, the second batch of ten episodes premiered on October 7, 2016. In April 2016, Netflix renewed The Ranch for a second season of 20 episodes, the first half of which premiered on June 16, 2017, and the second half was released on December 15, 2017.

On July 4, 2017, Netflix announced through its official The Ranch Twitter account that the show had been renewed for a third season of 20 episodes, the first ten of which aired on June 15, 2018. In December 2017, it was announced that Masterson had been written out of the show following multiple sexual assault allegations made against him, and appeared in only the first 10 episodes of the third season.

On October 31, 2018, Netflix renewed the series for a fourth and final season with the series to conclude in 2020. On August 21, 2019, it was announced that the first part of the final season (Part 7) was set to premiere on September 13, 2019. On December 9, 2019, it was reported that the second part of the final season (part 8) was set to be released on January 24, 2020.

== Reception ==
=== Critical response ===
The Ranch has earned mixed to positive reviews from critics. The review aggregator website Rotten Tomatoes gives the series an average approval rating of 63% (60% for season 1, 67% for season 2) based on 141 reviews, with an average rating of 4.5/10. The site's critical consensus reads, "A formulaic set-up and predictable plotting are elevated by The Ranch's surprising sensitivity and strong performances." Metacritic gave the series a score of 56 out of 100, based on 20 critics, indicating "mixed or average reviews."

Writing for Slate in a positive review, television critic Willa Paskin wrote of the show, "The Ranch is a red-state sitcom, though it takes place in the swing state of Colorado, and is good enough to be watched by people of any political affiliation" and "The goodness sneaks up on you." Los Angeles Times wrote: "[Elliott and Winger's] scenes together, as restrained as they are, are the show's most emotionally resonant. You will want to check them out."

=== Accolades ===
Award	Year	Category	Recipients	Episode	Result	Ref.
Primetime Emmy Awards	2017	Outstanding Cinematography for a Multi-Camera Series	Donald A. Morgan	"Easy Come, Easy Go"	Won	
Primetime Emmy Awards	2018	Outstanding Cinematography for a Multi-Camera Series	Donald A. Morgan	"Do What You Gotta Do"	Nominated	
Primetime Emmy Awards	2019	Outstanding Cinematography for a Multi-Camera Series	Donald A. Morgan	"Reckless"	Won	
Primetime Emmy Awards	2020	Outstanding Cinematography for a Multi-Camera Series	Donald A. Morgan	"It Ain't My Fault"	Won	
Primetime Emmy Awards	2020	Outstanding Sound Mixing for a Comedy or Drama Series (Half-hour) and Animation	Laura L. King, Bob La Masney, Kathy Oldham, and Ryan Kennedy	"Fadeaway"	Nominated	

== Filming locations ==
The Ranch was filmed on a sound stage in front of a live audience at Warner Brothers Studio stage 19 in Burbank, California. The opening sequence shows scenes from Norwood, and Ouray, Colorado, and the surrounding Ouray, and San Miguel Counties.

Exterior shots of Maggie's bar show the 141 Saloon (now a marijuana dispensary) located at 138 E. Main St. in Naturita, Colorado, a former uranium mining town.
