= Suzanne von Borsody =

German actress (born 1957)

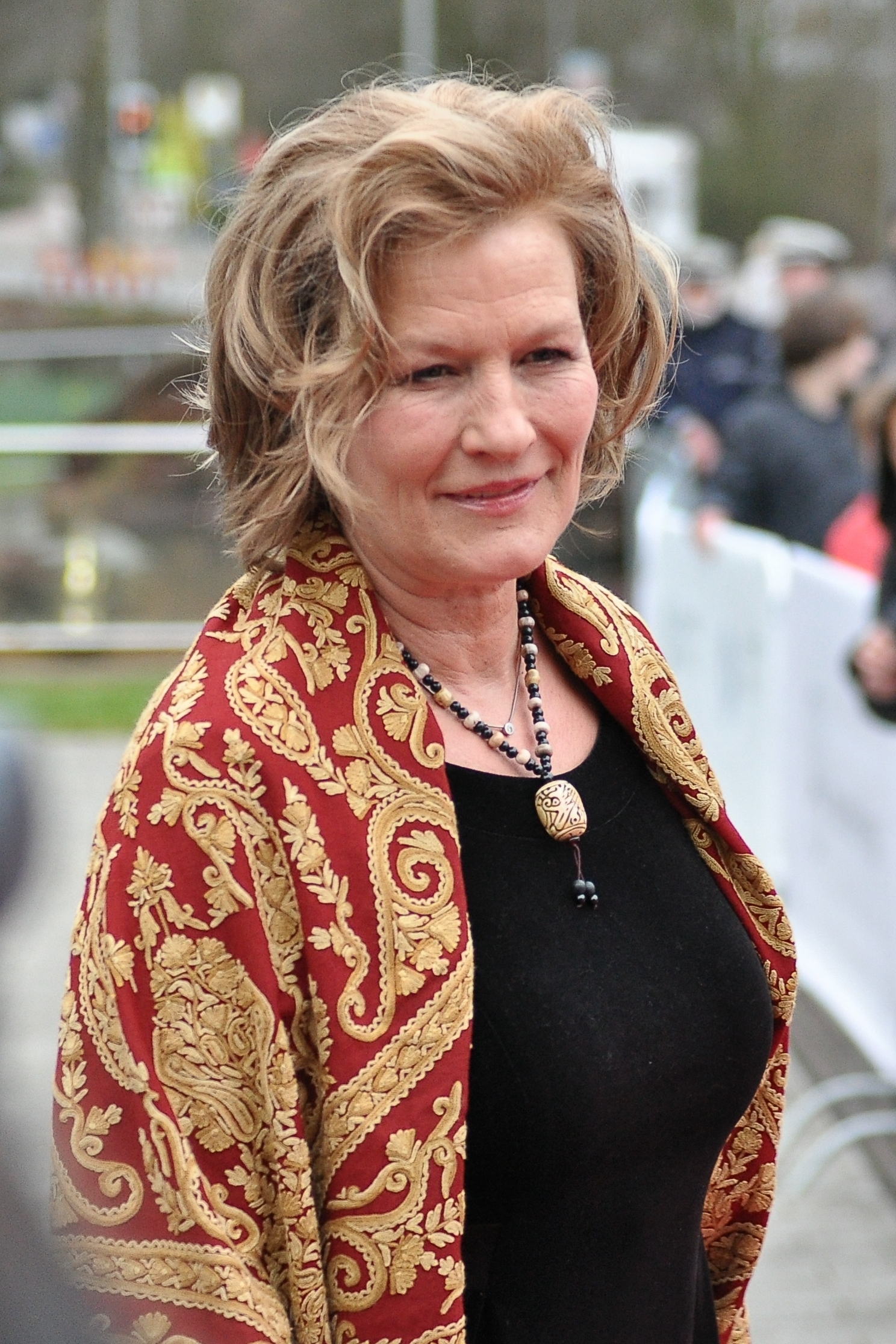
- Von Borsody in 2015
- Born: 23 September 1957 (age 68); Munich, West Germany
- Occupation: Actress

Signature
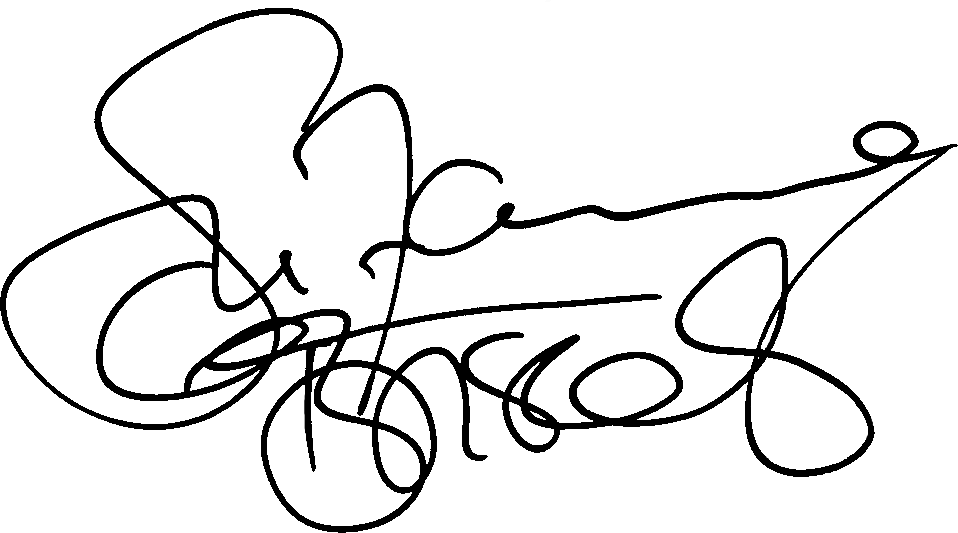

Suzanne von Borsody (German: [zu.ˈza.nə fɔn ˈbɔʁ.zo.diː]; born 23 September 1957) is a German actress.

She comes from a prominent theatre family, being the daughter of actress Rosemarie Fendel and actor Hans von Borsody. Her grandfather, Eduard von Borsody, was a famous director, while his brother, her great-uncle, Julius von Borsody, was an equally famous set designer.

She may be best known internationally for playing Frau Jäger in the 1998 film Run Lola Run, and has also done dubbing work for foreign films such as Treasure Planet, where she provides the German voice of Captain Amelia.

She is a Goodwill Ambassador for UNICEF as well as for several other charity organizations.

== Selected filmography ==
- Das eine Glück und das andere (1980, TV film)
- Fifty-Fifty (1988)
- Ostkreuz (1991)
- Justice (1993)
- Lauras Entscheidung (1994, TV film)
- The Lost Daughter (1997, TV film)
- Run Lola Run (1998)
- Am I Beautiful? (1998)
- Days of Darkness (1999, TV film)
- Anniversaries (2000, TV miniseries)
- Leo & Claire (2001)
- Liebe hat Vorfahrt (2005, TV film)
- Starting Over (2007, TV film)
- Abducted (2009, TV film)
- The Man from Beijing (2011, TV film)
- The Perjured Farmer (2012, TV film)
- A Faithful Husband (2014, TV film)
