= Ruggero Gabbai =

Italian film director and photographer

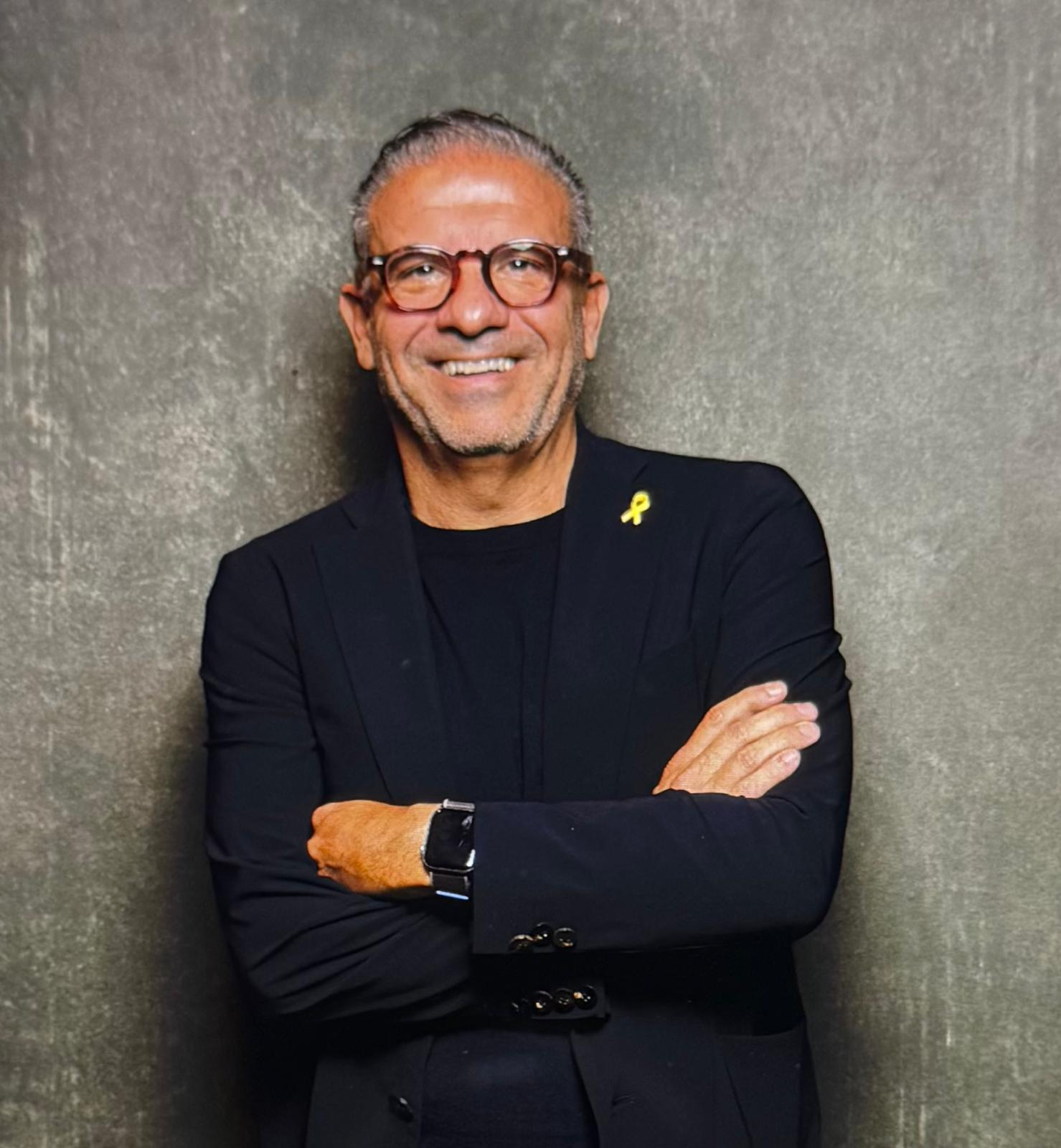
- Born: 6 August 1964 (age 61); Antwerp, Belgium
- Education: Columbia University School of the Arts
- Occupation: Film director, photographer

Ruggero Gabbai (Wilrijk, 6 August 1964) is an Italian film director and photographer.

== Biography ==
Ruggero Gabbai was born in Antwerp, Belgium in 1964 and grew up in Milan. Keen on photography since he was very young, at the age of nineteen he obtained a Bachelor of Fine Arts in photography, with a minor in philosophy, from the Rochester Institute of Technology.

In 1993 he obtained a Master of Fine Arts in film direction at Columbia University in New York City. Gabbai studied and worked with directors such as Miloš Forman, Paul Schrader, Emir Kusturica and Martin Scorsese. The first documentary he directed was his graduate thesis The King of Crown Heights, which aired on prime time by PBS and was distributed all over the world.

During those years, he worked in fashion photography for Paul Labraque's atelier, and he established the post-production company ARC Pictures.

Gabbai also worked as a photo-reporter for the South-American weekly magazine Cosas, shooting portraits of popular celebrities such as Leo Castelli, Imelda Marcos, Edward Coach, Julio Iglesias. He collaborated with the Giant's Stadium and the Madison Square Garden as a sport photographer. He edited the New York University newspaper covers, realising both the famous 360° panoramic view of the city and the Columbia University brochures through a special technique of negatives' manipulation.

In 1994, he moved back to Italy. He directed the documentary Memoria with the historical authorship of Marcello Pezzetti and Liliana Picciotto. The documentary was filmed in Auschwitz. In 1997 the film was selected by the Berlin International Film Festival, winning first prize at the Nuremberg film festival. Memoria aired on prime time on the national Italian TV channel RAI 2, with a share of 7 million viewers.

In 1997 Gabbai founded the Forma International production house, and since then he has directed more than 30 documentaries on various subjects, such as the one about Varenne, or Ajamola Ajamola about the killing of the giant tunas, and filmed profiles of Emma Bonino, Enzo Maiorca, and about fashion maisons Versace and Missoni.

In 2009, he directed Io ricordo, a docudrama about Mafia's victims. Io ricordo was produced by Gabriele Muccino and Marco Cohen's Indiana Production. It obtained the President of the Italian Republic's patronage, aired on the Italian TV-channel Canale 5, and was then distributed in home video by Medusa Film.

On 19 January 2010, during the 70th anniversary of Paolo Borsellino's birth, Gabbai, along with members of the foundation "Progetto Legalità" ("Project Legality"), was received by the President of the Italian Republic Giorgio Napolitano to present Io ricordo.

In 2010 he produced and directed the documentary "Jackfly", based on real events occurred in the financial world.

In 2011 Gabbai was elected a city councillor in Milan with the Giuliano Pisapia's Democratic Party (PD) committee. In January 2012 he was appointed President of the City Council Commission in charge of Expo 2015.

In 2013 he was the artistic director for the opening of Binario 21 at Stazione Centrale di Milano, in the presence of the highest political authorities. He completed the documentary The Longest Journey, about the deportation of the Italian Jews of Rhodes during the Second World War. The film has been selected at the 30th Jerusalem International Film Festival and it has been shown in a world premiere at the Museum of Jewish Heritage in New York City. Since then, the film has screened in many festivals worldwide, as well as airing on national TV-channel RAI 1 on International Holocaust Remembrance Day 2014 and 2015 and being presented at the Italian Parliament by the Speaker of the Chamber of Deputies, Laura Boldrini, together with the Minister of Education. In 2014, Ruggero Gabbai received the Mario Francese award for the high civil value of his films within the context of historical memory.

In 2015 Gabbai completed his documentary Starting Over Again on the Western communities during the '40s and the '50s in Egypt before the 1952 Revolution and the nationalism of Nasser. The film aired on JLTV in the US and Canada and has screened in many festivals around the world. The following year he produced and directed CityZen, a documentary on the destitute ZEN district in Palermo. In 2016, the film was in the official selection of the Taormina Film Festival.

In 2017 he completed his documentary Libia: l'ultimo esodo, a documentary portraying the life of the thriving Jewish community in Libya and in its capital, Tripoli, during the postwar period until the rise of Gheddafi. The documentary The Raid – Rome, 16 October 1943 recounts the biggest Nazi raid in Italy. The film was presented at the Chamber of Deputies (Italy), officially selected at the 13th edition of the Rome Film Festival and acquired by Italian national television Rai Cinema. In 2018 Gabbai directed Being Missoni, a portrait of the Missoni family and their international fashion legacy. The documentary aired on Sky Arte.

2020 saw the release of his most recent documentary, Kinderblock, about the children persecuted by Mengele, with precious testimony by Andra Bucci and Tatiana Bucci in the memory of their cousin Sergio De Simone. The docufilm was shot in Naples, Rijeka, Trieste, Birkenau and Hamburg. In February RAI, Italian national Television, aired the film reaching more than a million viewers.

Some of Ruggero Gabbai's documentaries have been shown in several international museums such as: the Israel Museum in Jerusalem, the Museum Ägyptischer Kunst in Munich, the Jewish Museum of New York, Yad Vashem and the Accademia di Belle Arti di Brera. Some of the documentaries are distributed in the U.S. by ChaiFlicks. Ruggero Gabbai's film, Du TGM au TGV, premiered with Michel Boujenah at the Grand Rex cinema.

Liliana was directed by Ruggero Gabbai and produced by Forma International in collaboration with Rai Cinema. It is a docu-fiction that portrays the unique and tragic life of Liliana Segre, life Senator of the Italian Republic. The film was selected for the 2024 Rome Film Festival and won the "Sorriso Diverso Roma Award." The film has the theatrical distribution of Lucky Red and True Colors.

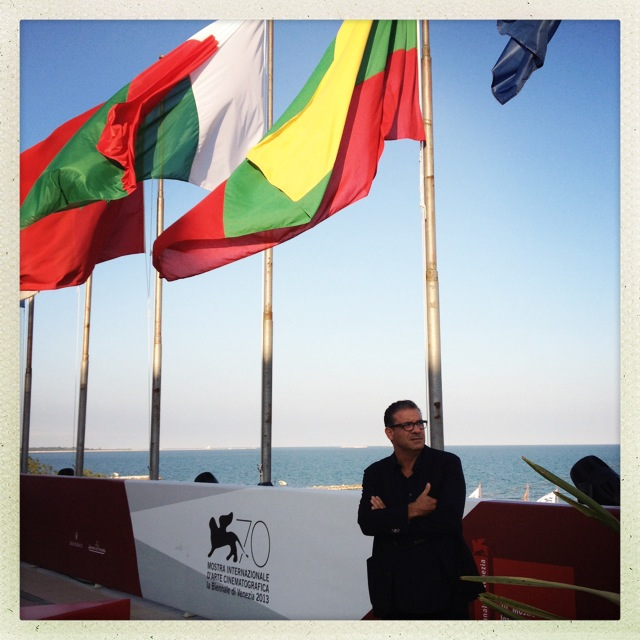
Ruggero Gabbai at Venice 70 Film Festival, 2013

== Filmography ==
- Liliana (2024)
- Du TGM au TGV (2022)
- Kinderblock (2020)
- The Raid – Rome, 16 October 1943 (2018)
- Being Missoni (2018)
- Libya: the last exodus (2017)
- CityZEN (2016)
- Starting Over Again (2015)
- The longest journey (2013)
- B&B Italia (2011)
- JACKFLY (2010)
- IO RICORDO (2008–2009)
- Arabi Danzanti (2007)
- Mediaset – Minotauro: Versace, Missoni, Emma Bonino, Enzo Maiorca, La danza delle cinque, Confronto istintivo e Un aiuto naturale(2006–2002)
- Gli ebrei di Fossoli (2006)
- Sarajevo, i figli d’Abramo (2002)
- Varenne, un’atleta chiamato cavallo (2002)
- Mediaset – Una penisola di storie: Ajamola ajamola, il rito della mattanza, Una città in Palio, Il Redentore (2001)
- American dream (2001)
- Okkio per okkio (2000)
- Gerusalemme, una promessa di pietra(1999)
- Viaggio verso casa (1998)
- Lavori in carne (1998)
- Cici daci dom, noi zingari d’italia (1998)
- Febbre rossa (1997)
- Memoria (1997)
- The king of crown heights (1994–1993)
- Free fallin (1992)
- Václav Havel, a day in New York (1990)
