= Starting All Over Again =

Starting All Over Again may refer to:

- "Starting All Over Again" (Mel & Tim song)
- "Starting All Over Again" (One Horse Blue song)

== See also ==
- Starting Out (disambiguation)
- Starting Over (disambiguation)
- Starting Over Again (disambiguation)
