= Primetime Emmy Award for Outstanding Cinematography for a Multi-Camera Series (Half-Hour) =

Television award category

- Awarded for: Outstanding Cinematography for a Multi-Camera Series (Half-Hour)
- Country: United States
- Presented by: Academy of Television Arts & Sciences
- First award: 2000
- Currently held by: How I Met Your Father (2022)
- Website: emmys.com

The Primetime Emmy Award for Outstanding Cinematography for a Multi-Camera Series (Half-Hour) is an annual award presented as part of the Primetime Emmy Awards. It was created in 2000, alongside the Primetime Emmy Award for Outstanding Cinematography for a Single-Camera Series. In 2023, it was combined with Single-Camera Series to form Outstanding Cinematography for a Series (Half-Hour). In 2024, it was reverted.

== Winners and nominations ==
=== 2000s ===
Year	Program	Episode	Nominees	Network
2000	Spin City	"Goodbye"	Richard Quinlan	ABC
2000	Sports Night	"Cut Man"	Peter Smokler	ABC
2000	3rd Rock from the Sun	"Dick and Harry Fall Down a Hole"	Ronald W. Browne	NBC
2000	Everybody Loves Raymond	"Robert's Rodeo"	Mike Berlin	CBS
2000	Will & Grace	"Acting Out"	Tony Askins	NBC
2001	Will & Grace	"Sons and Lovers"	Tony Askins	NBC
2001	100 Centre Street	"Things Change"	Ron Fortunato	A&E
2001	Everybody Loves Raymond	"Italy"	Mike Berlin	CBS
2001	Frasier	"And the Dish Ran Away with the Spoon"	Ken Lamkin	NBC
2001	Spin City	"Hello, Charlie"	Mikel Neiers	ABC
2002	Will & Grace	"A Chorus Lie"	Tony Askins	NBC
2002	American Family	"The Forgotten War"	Brian J. Reynolds	PBS
2002	Frasier	"Deathtrap"	Ken Lamkin	NBC
2002	Friends	"The One with the Rumor"	Nick McLean	NBC
2003	Will & Grace	"Sex, Losers, & Videotape"	Tony Askins	NBC
2003	Everybody Loves Raymond	"Just a Formality"	Mike Berlin	CBS
2003	Frasier	"Rooms with a View"	Ken Lamkin	NBC
2003	Friends	"The One in Barbados"	Nick McLean	NBC
2003	Girlfriends	"Where Everyone Knows My Name"	Donald A. Morgan	UPN
2003	My Big Fat Greek Life	"The Big Night"	Gil Hubbs	CBS
2004	8 Simple Rules	"Goodbye"	Bruce L. Finn	ABC
2004	Friends	"The One with Phoebe's Wedding"	Nick McLean	NBC
2004	George Lopez	"Bringing Home the Bacon"	Peter Smokler	ABC
2004	Two and a Half Men	"Camel Filters and Pheromones"	Steven V. Silver	CBS
2004	Will & Grace	"Ice Cream Balls"	Tony Askins	NBC
2005	Will & Grace	"Friends with Benefits"	Tony Askins	NBC
2005	Everybody Loves Raymond	"Pat's Secret"	Mike Berlin	CBS
2005	Hope & Faith	"Carmen Get It"	Richard Quinlan	ABC
2005	Reba	"Flowers for Van"	Bryan Hays	The WB
2005	Two and a Half Men	"Back Off, Mary Poppins"	Steven V. Silver	CBS
2006	How I Met Your Mother	"The Limo"	Chris La Fountaine	CBS
2006	According to Jim	"Mr. Right"	George Mooradian	ABC
2006	The New Adventures of Old Christine	"Open Water"	Gregg Heschong	CBS
2006	Reba	"The Goodbye Guy"	Bryan Hays	The WB
2006	Two and a Half Men	"Carpet Burns and a Bite Mark"	Steven V. Silver	CBS
2007	Two and a Half Men	"Release the Dogs"	Steven V. Silver	CBS
2007	According to Jim	"Hoosier Daddy"	George Mooradian	ABC
2007	Rules of Engagement	"Jeff's Wooby"	Wayne Kennan	CBS

=== 2010s ===
Year	Program	Episode	Nominees	Network
2011	Two and a Half Men	"Hookers, Hookers, Hookers"	Steven V. Silver	CBS
2011	How I Met Your Mother	"Hopeless"	Chris La Fountaine	CBS
2011	Pair of Kings	"Return of the Kings"	John Simmons	Disney
2011	Retired at 35	"Rocket Man"	Donald A. Morgan	TV Land
2011	Rules of Engagement	"Uh Oh, It's Magic"	Wayne Kennan	CBS
2011	Wizards of Waverly Place	"Dancing with Angels"	Rick F. Gunter	Disney
2012	Two and a Half Men	"Sips, Sonnets, and Sodomy"	Steven V. Silver	CBS
2012	How I Met Your Mother	"46 Minutes"	Chris La Fountaine	CBS
2012	Mike & Molly	"Victoria Can't Drive"	Gary Baum	CBS
2012	Pair of Kings	"The Evil King, Part 2"	John Simmons	Disney
2012	2 Broke Girls	"Pilot"	Gary Baum	CBS
2013	How I Met Your Mother	"The Final Page, Part 2"	Chris La Fountaine	CBS
2013	The Exes	"Pirates of the Care of Eden"	George Mooradian	TV Land
2013	Mike & Molly	"Molly's Birthday"	Gary Baum	CBS
2013	Two and a Half Men	"Grab a Feather and Get in Line"	Steven V. Silver	CBS
2013	2 Broke Girls	"And the Psychic Shakedown"	Chris La Fountaine	CBS
2014	How I Met Your Mother	"Daisy"	Christian La Fountaine	CBS
2014	The Exes	"When Haskell Met Sammy"	George Mooradian	TV Land
2014	Last Man Standing	"Eve's Boyfriend"	Donald A. Morgan	ABC
2014	Mike & Molly	"Weekend at Peggy's"	Gary Baum	CBS
2014	2 Broke Girls	"And the Near Death Experience"	Christian La Fountaine	CBS
2015	Mike & Molly	"Checkpoint Joyce"	Gary Baum	CBS
2015	The Big Bang Theory	"The Expedition Approximation"	Steven V. Silver	CBS
2015	The Millers	"Con-Troversy"	Gary Baum	CBS
2015	2 Broke Girls	"And the Old Bike Yarn"	Christian La Fountaine	CBS
2016	Nicky, Ricky, Dicky & Dawn	"Go Hollywood"	John Simmons	Nickelodeon
2016	The Big Bang Theory	"The Convergence Convergence"	Steven V. Silver	CBS
2016	Mom	"Sticky Hands and a Walk on the Wild Side"	Steven V. Silver	CBS
2016	The Soul Man	"White Trash"	George Mooradian	TV Land
2017
2017	The Ranch	"Easy Come, Easy Go"	Donald A. Morgan	Netflix
2017	K.C. Undercover	"The Legend of Bad, Bad Cleo Brown"	Joseph Wilmond Calloway	Disney
2017	Superior Donuts	"Crime Time"	Gary Baum	CBS
2017	2 Broke Girls	"And the Planes, Fingers and Automobiles"	Christian La Fountaine	CBS
2018
2018	Will & Grace	"A Gay Olde Christmas"	Gary Baum	NBC
2018	The Ranch	"Do What You Gotta Do"	Donald A. Morgan	Netflix
2018	Superior Donuts	"Grades of Wrath"	Patti Lee	CBS
2019
2019	The Ranch	"Reckless"	Donald A. Morgan	Netflix
2019	Rel	"Halloween"	George Mooradian	Fox
2019	Will & Grace	"Family, Trip"	Gary Baum	NBC

=== 2020s ===
Year	Program	Episode	Nominees	Network
2020
2020	The Ranch	"It Ain't My Fault"	Donald A. Morgan	Netflix
2020	Bob Hearts Abishola	"Ice Cream for Breakfast"	Patti Lee	CBS
2020	Family Reunion	"Remember Black Elvis?"	John Simmons	Netflix
2020	Will & Grace	"Accidentally on Porpoise"	Gary Baum	NBC
2021
2021	Country Comfort	"Crazy"	George Mooradian	Netflix
2021	Call Me Kat	"Plus One"	Patti Lee	Fox
2021	The Conners	"A Stomach Ache, a Heart Break and a Grave Mistake"	Donald A. Morgan	ABC
2021	Last Man Standing	"Time Flies"	Donald A. Morgan	Fox
2021	The Upshaws	"Big Plans"	Donald A. Morgan	Netflix
2022
2022	How I Met Your Father	"Pilot"	Gary Baum	Hulu
2022	B Positive	"Dagobah, A Room and a Chimney Sweep"	Steven V. Silver	CBS
2022	The Conners	"The Wedding of Dan and Louise"	Donald A. Morgan	ABC
2024
2024	How I Met Your Father	"Okay Fine, It's a Hurricane"	Gary Baum	Hulu
2024	Bob Hearts Abishola	"These Giants Are Flexible"	Patti Lee	CBS
2024	The Conners	"Fire and Vice"	Donald A. Morgan	ABC
2024	Frasier	"Reindeer Games"	Gary Baum	Paramount+
2024	Night Court	"A Night Court Before Christmas"	Wayne Kennan	NBC
2024	The Upshaws	"Forbidden Fruit"	Chuck Ozeas	Netflix

== Programs with multiple awards ==
5 wins

- Will & Grace

3 wins

- How I Met Your Mother
- The Ranch
- Two and a Half Men

2 wins

- How I Met Your Father

== Cinematographers with multiple awards ==
4 wins

- Tony Askins
- Gary Baum

3 wins

- Chris La Fountaine
- Donald A. Morgan
- Steven V. Silver

== Programs with multiple nominations ==
Totals include nominations for Outstanding Cinematography for a Single-Camera Series (Half-Hour).

9 nominations

- Will & Grace

8 nominations

- Two and a Half Men

5 nominations

- How I Met Your Mother
- 2 Broke Girls

4 nominations

- According to Jim
- Everybody Loves Raymond
- Frasier
- Mike & Molly
- The Ranch

3 nominations

- The Conners
- Friends

2 nominations

- The Big Bang Theory
- Bob Hearts Abishola
- The Exes
- How I Met Your Father
- Last Man Standing
- Pair of Kings
- Reba
- Rules of Engagement
- Spin City
- Superior Donuts
- The Upshaws

== Cinematographers with multiple nominations ==
12 nominations

- Gary Baum

11 nominations

- Donald A. Morgan
- Steven V. Silver

9 nominations

- Chris La Fountaine
- George Mooradian

6 nominations

- Tony Askins

4 nominations

- Mike Berlin
- John Simmons

3 nominations

- Ken Lamkin
- Patti Lee
- Nick McLean

2 nominations

- Bryan Hays
- Wayne Kennan
- Richard Quinlan
- Peter Smokler
