= Donald A. Morgan =

American cinematographer

- Born: Donald A. Morgan; Philadelphia, Pennsylvania, U.S.
- Education: Alexander Hamilton High School (Los Angeles); Los Angeles Trade–Technical College
- Occupations: Cinematographer; Television director; Lighting designer
- Years active: 1970s–present
- Employers: ABC; CBS; Netflix
- Organization: American Society of Cinematographers (ASC)
- Known for: Home Improvement; The Ranch; The Conners; Last Man Standing; Among others
- Style: Multi-camera television cinematography
- Parent: Al Morgan (father)
- Awards: 10 Primetime Emmy Awards; Television Hall of Fame inductee (2022)

Donald A. Morgan is an American cinematographer. He has won 10 Emmy Awards, including seven for Home Improvement and three for The Ranch. In 2022, he was inducted into the Television Hall of Fame. As of 2021, he held the record for the most awarded Black person at the Emmys.

== Early life ==
Morgan was born in Philadelphia to American jazz musician Al Morgan and his wife, though the family moved to Los Angeles when his mother took a job as a pathologist at the University of California, Los Angeles. Following in his father's footsteps, Morgan was a musician, playing the stand-up bass in middle school and the bass guitar in high school.

After graduating from Alexander Hamilton High School, Morgan attended Los Angeles Trade–Technical College, where he studied graphic art and architecture.

== Career ==
One of the first Black directors of photography at a major network, Morgan started his television career in KTTV's mailroom, advancing to their lighting department. During the 1970s, he worked in Norman Lear productions such as All in the Family, The Jeffersons, and One Day at a Time. Due to the diverse casts in the shows, Morgan had to learn new techniques to appropriately and adequately provide lighting for people with varying skin tones. In 1983, he was named Director of Photography, one of the first Black people to hold such a role on a major network. Morgan went on to contribute to series such as Three's Company, Silver Spoons, Gloria, Home Improvement, Last Man Standing, The Ranch, and The Conners in addition to lighting for other programs, including Baryshnikov on Broadway and the NAACP Image Awards.

Morgan has received various honors for his work. In 1990, he received an Emmy nominated for his work on Bagdad Cafe, which was followed by seven additional Emmys for Home Improvement and three for The Ranch. He has received a total of 21 Emmy nominations, as well as the Career Achievement in Television Award from the American Society of Cinematographers. In 2022, the Academy of Television Arts & Sciences inducted him into the Television Hall of Fame. He is the first director of photography to earn the latter honor.

Morgan serves as the Co–Chairman of DEI for the IA Local 600 Cinematographers Guild.

== Personal life ==
Morgan is married to Hollywood make-up artist Geneva Nash-Morgan.

== Awards and honors ==
In 2020, Morgan received the American Society of Cinematographers Career Achievement in Television Award, and in 2022, the Academy of Television Arts & Sciences inducted him into the Television Hall of Fame. He is the first director of photography to earn the latter honor.

Awards for Morgan's work
Year	Title	Award	Result	Ref.
1990	Bagdad Cafe, "Prototype" (pilot)	Emmy Award for Outstanding Lighting Direction (Electronic) for a Comedy Series	Nominated	
1992	Home Improvement, "Luck Be A Taylor Tonight"	Emmy Award for Outstanding Lighting Direction (Electronic) for a Comedy Series	Winner	
1993	Home Improvement, "Bye Bye Birdie"	Emmy Award for Outstanding Lighting Direction (Electronic) for a Comedy Series	Winner	
1994	Home Improvement, "Twas the Blight"	Emmy Award for Outstanding Lighting Direction (Electronic) for a Comedy Series	Winner	
1995	Home Improvement, "My Dinner With Wilson"	Emmy Award for Outstanding Lighting Direction (Electronic) for a Comedy Series	Winner	
1996	Home Improvement, "Room Without a View"	Emmy Award for Outstanding Lighting Direction (Electronic) for a Comedy Series	Winner	
1997	Home Improvement, "I Was A Teenage Taylor"	Emmy Award for Outstanding Lighting Direction (Electronic) for a Comedy Series	Nominated	
1998	Home Improvement, "A Night To Dismember"	Emmy Award for Outstanding Lighting Direction (Electronic) for a Comedy Series	Winner	
1999	Home Improvement, "Mark's Big Break"	Emmy Award for Outstanding Lighting Direction (Electronic) for a Comedy Series	Winner	
2003	Girlfriends, "Where Everyone Knows My Name"	Emmy Award for Outstanding Cinematography for a Multi-Camera Series	Nominated	
2011	Retired at 35, "Rocket Man"	Emmy Award for Outstanding Cinematography for a Multi-Camera Series	Nominated	
2014	Last Man Standing, "Eve's Boyfriend"	Emmy Award for Outstanding Cinematography for a Multi-Camera Series	Nominated	
2017	The Ranch, "Easy Come, Easy Go"	Emmy Award for Outstanding Cinematography for a Multi-Camera Series	Winner	
2018	The Ranch, "Do What You Gotta Do"	Emmy Award for Outstanding Cinematography for a Multi-Camera Series	Nominated	
2019	The Ranch, "Reckless"	Emmy Award for Outstanding Cinematography for a Multi-Camera Series	Winner	
2020	The Ranch, "It Ain't My Fault"	Emmy Award for Outstanding Cinematography for a Multi-Camera Series	Winner	
2021	Last Man Standing, "Time Flies"	Emmy Award for Outstanding Cinematography for a Multi-Camera Series	Nominated	
2021	The Conners, "A Stomach Ache, a Heart Break, and a Grave Mistake"	Emmy Award for Outstanding Cinematography for a Multi-Camera Series	Nominated	
2021	The Upshaws, "Big Plans"	Emmy Award for Outstanding Cinematography for a Multi-Camera Series	Nominated	
2022	The Conners, "The Wedding of Dan and Louise"	Emmy Award for Outstanding Cinematography for a Multi-Camera Series	Nominated	
2024	The Conners, "Fire And Vice"	Emmy Award for Outstanding Cinematography for a Multi-Camera Series (Half-Hour)	Nominated	

== Filmography ==
=== Film ===
Morgan's roles in film
Year	Title	Role
1979	Bear Island	Aerial camera operator
1983	Off the Wall	Cinematographer
1988	Rattle and Hum	Lighting technician
1992	Saved by the Bell: Hawaiian Style	Cinematographer
2006	Let Me Count the Ways (short)	Cinematographer; Co–executive producer

=== Television ===
Morgan's roles in television
Year	Title	Role
1979	The Facts of Life	Lighting director
1985	227	Cinematographer
1985	New Love American Style	Lighting director
1985–86	The Golden Girls	Lighting designer
1986	The Last Chance Cafe	Lighting director
1987	Changing Patterns (pilot)	Lighting designer
1987	Marblehead Manson	Cinematographer
1987	The Pursuit of Happiness	Cinematographer
1988	Cadets (pilot)	Lighting director
1989	Coming to America	Cinematographer
1989	Homeroom	Lighting consultant; Lighting designer
1989	The Robert Guillaume Show	Lighting director
1989	Sister Kate	Cinematographer
1989	Somerset Gardens (pilot)	Lighting director
1990	Bagdad Cafe	
1990	Hurricane Sam	
1990-92	The Fresh Prince of Bel-Air	Lighting director
1991	Clippers (pilot)	Cinematographer
1991	In the House (pilot)	Lighting director
1991–99	Home Improvement	Cinematographer; Lighting designer; Lighting director
1992	Rachel Gunn, R.N	Cinematographer
1992–94	Where I Live	Cinematographer
1993	The Barbara Walters Special	Cinematographer
1993	Count on Me	Lighting designer
1993	The Nanny (pilot)	Cinematographer
1993	Saved by the Bell	Lighting director
1993–94	Boy Meets World	Cinematographer
1994	All–American Girl	Cinematographer
1994	South Central	Cinematographer
1994	Thunder Alley	Cinematographer
1994-95	In the House	Lighting director
1994–95	Martin	Cinematographer
1994–95	The Parent 'Hood	Cinematographer
1995	The Preston Episodes	Cinematographer
1995–96	Moesha	Cinematographer
1996	Bedtime	Cinematographer
1996	Buddies	Lighting director
1997	Bouncers (pilot)	Cinematographer
1997	Built to Last	Cinematographer
1997	The Gregory Hines Show	Cinematographer
1997	Life … and Stuff	Cinematographer
1997	Merry Christmas, George Bailey	Lighting designer
1997	Party Girl	Cinematographer
1997	Soul Man	Cinematographer
1997	Teen Angel	Cinematographer
1998	Brother's Keeper	Cinematographer
1998	Costello	Cinematographer
1998	Damon	Cinematographer
1998	Linc's	Cinematographer
1998	Oh Baby	Cinematographer
1998	Solo en America	Lighting consultant
1999–00	Grown Ups	Cinematographer
2000	Daddio	Cinematographer
2000	Martha Stewart's Christmas Dream	Cinematographer
2000	Viva Vegas!	Lighting consultant
2000–08	Girlfriends	Cinematographer
2001	32nd NAACP Image Awards	Lighting designer
2001	Reba	Lighting consultant
2001–05	My Wife and Kids	Cinematographer
2002	33rd NAACP Image Awards	Lighting designer
2003	34th NAACP Image Awards	Lighting designer
2003	Essence Awards	Lighting designer
2003	Lost at Home	Cinematographer
2003	The Tracy Morgan Show	Cinematographer
2004	35th Annual NAACP Image Awards	Lighting designer
2004	Gas	Cinematographer
2005	36th Annual NAACP Image Awards	Lighting designer
2005	The Big Black Comedy Show, Vol. 2	Cinematographer
2005	Stacked	Cinematographer
2005	Wild 'n Out	Cinematographer
2005–07	The War at Home	Cinematographer
2006	37th NAACP Image Awards	Lighting designer
2006	Let Me Count the Ways (short)	Cinematographer; Co–executive producer
2007	38th NAACP Image Awards	Cinematographer; Lighting designer
2007	The Return of Jezebel James	Cinematographer
2005–06	Stacked	Cinematographer
2005–07	The War at Home	Cinematographer
2008	The Return of Jezebel James	Cinematographer
