= Robin Pilcher =

British author

Robin Pilcher (born 10 August 1950) is a British author, the eldest son of author Rosamunde Pilcher. His books have been translated into more than a dozen languages.

== Bibliography ==
- An Ocean Apart, 1999, ISBN 0-312-19995-3
- Starting Over, 2002, ISBN 0-312-26995-1
- A Risk Worth Taking, 2004, ISBN 0-312-27002-X
- Starburst, 2007, ISBN 0-312-35608-0
- The Long Way Home, 2010, ISBN 0-312-35435-5

== Television adaptations ==
- An Ocean Apart (2006)
- Starting Over (2007)
- A Risk Worth Taking (2008)
