= Starting Over (2007 film) =

2007 television film directed by Giles Foster

- Based on: Starting Over by Robin Pilcher
- Screenplay by: Matthew Thomas
- Directed by: Giles Foster
- Starring: Suzanne von Borsody; Iain Glen; Rutger Hauer
- Theme music composer: Richard Blackford
- Countries of origin: Germany; United Kingdom
- Original language: English

Production
- Producer: Rikolt von Gagern
- Cinematography: Tony Imi
- Editor: Catherine Creed
- Running time: 115 minutes (Germany); 89 minutes (UK)
- Production companies: Zweites Deutsches Fernsehen (ZDF); Gate Television Productions

Original release
- Network: ZDF
- Release: 26 December 2007

Starting Over is a 2007 Scottish romantic drama television film directed by Giles Foster, produced by the British company Gate Television Productions for the German television channel Zweites Deutsches Fernsehen (ZDF). Based on the 2002 novel of the same name by Robin Pilcher, the film stars Suzanne von Borsody, Iain Glen and Rutger Hauer.

== Plot summary ==
The film explores how an aristocratic woman's life changes when her brother dies and her marriage breaks down. Lady Elizabeth Dewhurst (Suzanne von Borsody) believes her husband Gregor (Iain Glen) is at fault for the accidental death of her beloved brother Simon (William Mickleburgh). Their marriage has been rocky, but this is the last straw and she asks him to move out of the household. Elizabeth's best friend Mary Phillips (Rachel Fielding) has had her eye on Gregor for some time and sees this as her chance. She encourages them to use the services of a powerful but shady family attorney, Mr. Sharp (Jonathan Coy), and Sharp expects to benefit financially from the division of the Dewherst estate. Peter Rosen (Rutger Hauer) is visiting from a local University. Liz is drawn to him for a mild affair, even though he is the professor of her son Alex (Daniel Sharman).

== Cast ==
- Suzanne von Borsody as Lady Elizabeth Dewhurst
- Iain Glen as Gregor Dewhurst
- Rutger Hauer as Peter Rossen
- Jonathan Coy as David Sharp
- Colette O'Neil as Mrs Lawson
- Richard Addison as Mr. Hamilton
- Daniel Sharman as Alexander Dewhurst
- Rachel Fielding as Mary Phillips
- William Mickleburgh as Simon McNichols
- Leeann Watson (nee Dodds) as extra in lecture hall.

== Production ==
The story is set in Scotland. The film was shot in Scotland in July and August 2007.

== Release ==
The film had its television premiere on 26 December 2007.
