= List of The Ranch episodes =

The Ranch is an American sitcom, created as original programming for Netflix by Don Reo and Jim Patterson. The show is centered around the Bennett family and their cattle ranch in Colorado.

The show ran for four seasons, with each season consisting of 20 episodes broken into two 10 episodes parts. All episodes in each part were released as simultaneous batches, with the first part airing on April 1, 2016. All episodes are named after American country music songs.

== Series overview ==
Part	Season	Episodes	Originally released
1	1	10	April 1, 2016
2	1	10	October 7, 2016
3	2	10	June 16, 2017
4	2	10	December 15, 2017
5	3	10	June 15, 2018
6	3	10	December 7, 2018
7	4	10	September 13, 2019
8	4	10	January 24, 2020

== Episodes ==
=== Part 1 (2016) ===
No. overall	No. in part	Title	Directed by	Written by	Original release date
1	1	"Back Where I Come From"	David Trainer	Don Reo & Jim Patterson	April 1, 2016
Beau comes home to a surprise visit from Colt, who is in transit to a tryout with a semi-pro football team in Denver. Beau scolds Colt for not helping out on the ranch, a promise he made six years ago. Beau, Colt and Rooster meet Maggie at her bar, but Colt invites Heather, one of the patrons, to have sex. Beau asks Colt to help with giving birth to a stillborn calf, which is eventually saved when Colt gives it CPR. Colt learns that Beau is having a hard time managing the ranch because of an extensive drought and having only Rooster to help. Colt makes the Denver team, but tells his father he didn't, and offers to stay and help with the ranch. The drought breaks, and the Bennetts reunite at home.
2	2	"Some People Change"	David Trainer	Story by : Don Reo & Jim Patterson; Teleplay by : Matt Ross & Max Searle	April 1, 2016
Colt gets into a heated argument with Beau and Rooster as they make him do the dirtiest work on the ranch. Colt seeks consolation with his mom at Maggie's and bumps into Abby, his high school sweetheart, and her boyfriend Kenny, who attended high school with Colt and Abby and played in the band. Abby comes to the Bennett house that night to meet Colt and confess her love for Kenny, whom she expects to marry. Feeling depressed, Colt sleeps in and comes to work late. An angry Beau tells Colt to go back to the house to make him coffee and Colt refuses, so Beau says if Colt can't follow directions, he can leave. Beau and Rooster argue about Beau's treatment of Colt, with Beau claiming he pushes Colt hard in order "to prepare him for the rest of his life". Colt converses with Maggie, who points out his tendencies toward stubbornness and running away from problems – traits he shares with Beau. After reflecting on Maggie's observation, Colt returns to the ranch the next morning, makes breakfast for Rooster and Beau, and prepares for a hard day of work.
3	3	"The Boys of Fall"	David Trainer	Story by : Steve Tompkins & Nathan Chetty; Teleplay by : Jim Patterson & Jamie Rhonheimer	April 1, 2016
Colt, Rooster, and Beau toss a football and Beau injures his back. Maggie disproves Beau's claims that he's uninjured by challenging him to pick a beer up from the floor of the bar. Kenny asks Colt to give a speech at the Garrison High School football team's annual dinner. Colt meets Garrison's new quarterback and coach, but his egotistical storytelling earns him their disrespect. Beau visits the doctor, who disproves his claim of feeling no pain by leaving a prescription on the floor for him to pick up. The doctor diagnoses Beau with high blood pressure and advises him to cut back on alcohol and red meat. Abby drops off Colt's high school letter man jacket for him to wear at the dinner, but he makes the conversation awkward by trying to kiss her, to which she is unreceptive. As a result, he humiliates himself at the speech. Afterwards, Colt is pulled over for driving a tractor while impaired, and the arresting officer is his high school friend Billy. At breakfast the next morning, Beau suggests Colt is exercising poor judgment because he has not yet decided who he wants to be.
4	4	"Got a Little Crazy"	David Trainer	Story by : Don Reo & Jim Patterson; Teleplay by : Steve Tompkins & Nikki Schiefelbein	April 1, 2016
Rooster tries to convince Colt to go to Maggie's with him, but Colt doesn't want to go because he's afraid of running into Abby. Colt reluctantly accompanies Rooster, meets Abby and apologizes to her, and agrees to respect her relationship with Kenny. Heather and Nikki plan a party with Colt, Rooster, Kenny, and Billy. A drunk Abby says she thinks Colt deserves a better girlfriend than the much younger Heather and tries to kiss him, but Colt turns her down. Rooster's advance on Nikki fails because she falls for Billy. Maggie invites Beau to spend the night at the Telluride Marriott, the prize she won in the raffle at the football team's dinner. Maggie hopes for a romantic evening, while Beau intends to have quiet time alone with her watching TV. An argument ensues, with Maggie blaming Beau for always insisting on having his way and Beau apologizing for not being more understanding.
5	5	"American Kids"	David Trainer	Story by : Matt Ross & Max Searle; Teleplay by : Don Reo & Jeff Lowell	April 1, 2016
Beau tries to bond with Colt by picking him as his hunting partner for opening day, disappointing Rooster, who is used to being chosen. Rooster vents to Maggie, and ends up as her hunting partner. Rooster's favorite hunting hat comes up missing, and Colt admits to losing it the night before. Colt's constant complaining results in Beau kicking him out of the hunting shack, so Rooster and Colt switch places. Rooster complains that Colt abandoned the family, leaving Rooster no choice but to stay at the ranch. Colt tells Rooster that Rooster chose to stay instead of doing anything else. Beau and Maggie decide to head back to the house together, leaving the bickering Rooster and Colt to walk home in the rain. The next day, Colt attempts to retrieve Rooster's hunting hat, but mistakenly assaults a neighbor and steals the neighbor's hat. As the neighbor heads up the Bennett driveway intend on revenge, Rooster tosses the hat back to Colt and locks himself in the house, leaving Colt to deal with the angry neighbor.
6	6	"Better as a Memory"	David Trainer	Story by : Jamie Rhonheimer & Jeff Lowell; Teleplay by : Don Reo & Nathan Chetty	April 1, 2016
At Maggie's, Abby apologizes to Colt for being drunk at his house party, and Colt teases her for trying to kiss him. Heather and Colt go to Maggie's trailer to have sex and accidentally burn the trailer by causing the drapes to catch fire. Colt invites Maggie to stay at the Bennett house, but doesn't ask permission, and Beau distances himself from Maggie. The following night, Maggie and Beau warm up to each other and spend the night together. The next day, Beau asks Maggie to move back in, but she declines. Colt considers whether to buy a birthday gift for Heather, and Rooster explains all the ways he has avoided giving gifts to his previous girlfriends. Abby buys replacement drapes as a gift for Maggie and meets Colt, who is still wondering whether to get a birthday gift for Heather. Abby realizes that despite the age difference, Colt and Heather's relationship is more than just casual, so she advises him that he should. Colt gives Heather lingerie for her birthday gift, and as a result she believes that their relationship is more serious than Colt does.
7	7	"I Can't Go There"	David Trainer	Story by : Matt Ross & Max Searle; Teleplay by : Jim Patterson & Nathan Chetty	April 1, 2016
Beau is still upset because Maggie declined his invitation to move back in to the Bennett house. Abby continues to give Colt advice about his relationship with Heather and they conclude that Colt should end it. The breakup text he sends backfires and he has to go see Heather, who says she is fine with ending the relationship but still willing to see Colt casually. One of the calves is ill and Beau initially disregards the advice of Dale, their vet, to give it antibiotics. Maggie visits Beau, who gives his full attention to the sick calf, causing Maggie to storm out in anger. Heather and Colt arrive at the house, where Heather bonds with Beau over the sick calf, during which she reveals her 4-H and rodeo background. Maggie returns to reconcile with Beau, but says she doesn't want to move back home, so he asks her for a divorce. Beau relents and gives the sick calf an antibiotic shot, but the calf dies. Beau breaks down in tears over the death of the calf and the coming end of his marriage to Maggie.
8	8	"Til It's Gone"	David Trainer	Story by : Steve Tompkins & Steve Leff; Teleplay by : Jamie Rhonheimer & Matt Ross	April 1, 2016
With money short, Beau, Rooster and Colt apply for a loan to keep the ranch operating. The banker is a part time high school football referee, and Colt accuses him of making a bad call that cost Colt's team a championship. The bank declines the loan, so Beau has the electricity turned off and looks for other ways to reduce expenses. Colt tells Maggie about the problem, and she offers to put her bar up as collateral for a loan, but Beau declines. Beau complains to Colt for telling Maggie about the difficulty at the ranch and accuses him of spending too much and not doing enough to help with the ranch work. Colt responds that Beau is too stubborn to change or ask for help, but expects that Colt and Rooster should. Beau talks with Maggie again and confesses that he does not want her to put the bar up for collateral because if the ranch fails, he would also ruin her financially. Maggie says she believes in Beau and is sure he will succeed, and he agrees to let her help with obtaining the loan.
9	9	"There Goes My Life"	David Trainer	Story by : Don Reo & Jim Patterson; Teleplay by : Max Searle & Nathan Chetty	April 1, 2016
Heather offers Rooster to go for a blind date with her sister, Darlene, whose boyfriend left after she gave birth. The date goes unsuccessfully as Darlene storms out after seeing her ex's photos. After taking Darlene home, Rooster has sex with their mom, Mary, much to the astonishment of Colt. Colt confronts Mary the next day and Heather asks him to respect their relationship. Maggie comes home and asks Beau to go to counseling together, which also goes awry as Beau storms out. Beau consults with Dale the next day, who tells him to put up with things that annoy him for something he loves. That night, he apologizes to Maggie. Meanwhile, Kenny proposes to Abby at Cracker Barrel as Colt witnesses.
10	10	"Down the Road"	David Trainer	Story by : Don Reo & Jim Patterson & Nathan Chetty; Teleplay by : Matt Ross & Max Searle	April 1, 2016
Beau continues holding out on selling the cattle out of fear of making a loss, while the ranch remains without electricity. Maggie tells Beau during his visit that she would like to come back to the ranch. Colt admits his astonishment, but not his heartbroken feelings, of Abby's proposal while she visits. As he tells all his concerns to Heather, she leaves him in anger. Rooster goes overboard over dating with Mary and asks him to date her more maturely. A nearby river spilled poisonous sewage affecting the local ranches; to the Bennetts' luck, their ranch is spared and eventually they can sell their cattle at a profit. At the ranch party, Heather successfully reconciles with Colt and promises to be honest with each other. Beau admits his love for the boys and gives Colt his championship ring. He then visits Maggie's to help her moving but sees her trailer is gone. Abby has doubts about marrying Kenny and tells Colt.

=== Part 2 (2016) ===
No. overall	No. in part	Title	Directed by	Written by	Original release date
11	1	"Gone as a Girl Can Get"	David Trainer	Story by : Steve Tompkins & Jeff Lowell; Teleplay by : Don Reo & Jim Patterson	October 7, 2016
Abby implicitly tells Colt she wants to get back with him. Beau is deeply hurt because Maggie leaves, burns Maggie's stuff and is hostile with Colt and Rooster. Heather visits Colt but breaks up after he inadvertently says that he favors Abby over her. Colt visits Abby, only to be told she is staying with Kenny, yet ends up with them kissing each other. Beau admits he still loves Maggie as he attempts to blanket her plants from frost.
12	2	"Living and Living Well"	David Trainer	Story by : Matt Ross & Max Searle; Teleplay by : Jamie Rhonheimer & Nathan Chetty	October 7, 2016
Abby confesses her rekindled feelings for Colt and asks him not to tell anyone. He ends up telling Rooster. Beau gives them money for their hard work during the hard times. Ed, a longtime friend, visits Beau and attempts to convince him to sell the ranch to Neumann's Hill, a corporation which buys cattle from ranchers for a fixed price and had acquired one of the ranches in the state. Later Ed talks to Rooster and Colt at the bar about the benefits of selling the ranch and they go home and attempt to convince Beau to sell, much to his fury because he's afraid of losing his family's legacy. Billy sells his well-worn Bronco to Colt and Rooster in order to buy a ring for Nikki; he accidentally mentions needing the money for a ring while next to her when showing the boys the truck, she says yes.
13	3	"Sittin' on the Fence"	David Trainer	Story by : Don Reo & Jeff Lowell; Teleplay by : Jim Patterson & Steve Tompkins	October 7, 2016
Mary invites Beau and Rooster to have dinner at Cracker Barrel where she works. She intends to set Beau up with Joanne, one of the waitresses. Colt dropped bags of flour, instead of flowers, at Abby's home and she laughs about it at Maggie's. While on her date with Kenny, Colt tries to flirt with her. Frightened, she leaves with Kenny. Mary invites Joanne to dinner at the ranch but Beau scorns the latter for their stark differences. The next evening however, they see each other again to chat over dessert. Maggie comes back and sees the two together.
14	4	"Let's Fall to Pieces Together"	David Trainer	Story by : Jamie Rhonheimer & Nikki Schiefelbein; Teleplay by : Matt Ross & Steve Leff	October 7, 2016
Beau still holds a grudge for Maggie leaving him; the boys beg him to see her. At the bar, Heather walks by and reconciles with Colt, and the two hook up later. After hours, Beau meets Maggie at the bar. Maggie says that she ran away because she is afraid that reconciling with him will mean spending all her time at the ranch, and she asks him to live nomadic with her. Joanne comes back and helps Beau decide between Maggie and the ranch. Beau decides to stay, and with a heavy heart calls for a divorce. Rooster sets up Abby to talk with Colt at the ranch. Abby arrives and tells Colt she broke up with Kenny. Heather walks out of the house and sees the two, and the girls both become furious with Colt. Colt unsuccessfully tries to reconcile with Abby.
15	5	"I Know She Still Loves Me"	David Trainer	Story by : Don Reo & Jim Patterson; Teleplay by : Jeff Lowell & Max Searle	October 7, 2016
The next morning, Colt tries again to reconcile with Abby and successfully asks her for a date. At the bar, Kenny sits with Colt and Rooster when the latter plans a guys' night party for the three of them to erase Kenny's heartbroken feelings. After that, they break into Abby's classroom. A bride and groom figurine Kenny gave to Abby entices him to try and win her back. Colt then admits he is the reason for their breakup, making Kenny furious. Abby has doubts about her relationship, but Colt convinces her. Jerry, the family's lawyer, attempts to settle the divorce of Beau and Maggie, but she revises her terms to give her share of the ranch to the boys, infuriating Beau. Despite the divorce eventually going forward, Maggie comes back to tell Beau he needs to give their sons more responsibility if he wants the ranch to remain in the family. That night, Beau delegates the upcoming herd insemination to Rooster and Colt.
16	6	"Easy Come, Easy Go"	David Trainer	Story by : Matt Ross & Max Searle; Teleplay by : Don Reo & Nathan Chetty	October 7, 2016
Colt and Rooster try to satisfy Beau by doing the insemination themselves; he tells them they are doing it wrong while still letting them off. From Dale's inspection, they only successfully made one cow pregnant, much to Beau's dissatisfaction. Maggie tells Beau to give them a chance. The next day however, Beau takes the duty back from them. Abby's mom has an accident and Colt visits her. At the hospital, Colt sees Kenny hugging Abby. Colt fights with her over this at her home after Abby does not mention Kenny was there. Colt demands that she depend only on him, but she says Kenny was there as a friend of the family. Kenny, still mad, says he still considers Abby his fiancée and firmly believes she will return to him after fooling around with Colt.
17	7	"I've Come to Expect It from You"	David Trainer	Story by : Jim Patterson & Jamie Rhonheimer; Teleplay by : Steve Tompkins & Jeff Lowell	October 7, 2016
On their first date since getting back together, Colt takes Abby to a laundromat where once stood Rick's Arcade, the site of their first date as teenagers. They have sex later and read together at her house. Colt tries to read a book to satisfy Abby but the next night buys her a TV. Colt is concerned about his differences with Abby but she tells him they complete each other. Rooster, still upset, vents to Maggie; she tells him to just let it go. Maggie storms back to the ranch to hand Beau the divorce papers and scold him for ignoring his promise to her about giving the boys more responsibility. When Dale's inspection confirms Beau had better success with the insemination job, the boys leave him. Joanne stops by and illustrates her distant relationship with her daughter, telling Beau that maintaining a relationship is more important than just being right. Ed invites Rooster to take over management at another ranch.
18	8	"The Cowboy Rides Away"	David Trainer	Story by : Nikki Schiefelbein & Nathan Chetty; Teleplay by : Jim Patterson & Steve Leff	October 7, 2016
Beau apologizes to the boys for not trusting them enough. Rooster dismisses Ed's offer as Maggie suggests otherwise. He visits Ed's farm and meets Umberto, his farm's former caretaker. The two reunite with Colt and Abby at the bar. Rooster mentions the offer from Ed, to the disbelief of Colt, and then gets passive-aggressive with Beau. When Colt storms to Maggie, she defends her decision by saying Rooster deserves to be happy. She then tells Colt that Rooster bought him the plane ticket for a Barcelona Dragons tryout as a way of supporting him. Colt eventually tells Rooster he should take Ed's job offer. Rooster then tells this to Beau, while thanking him for all he's learned so far. Beau walks away in disbelief.
19	9	"Leavin's Been Comin' (For a Long, Long Time)"	David Trainer	Story by : Jamie Rhonheimer & Steve Tompkins; Teleplay by : Don Reo & Jeff Lowell	October 7, 2016
Despite Rooster's new job starting in two weeks, Beau kicks him out and he moves into Mary's house. Maggie tells Beau she set up Rooster's job offer with Ed as a way to make him more mature and earn more money. After hearing Umberto's revelation about giving money to his family while staying poor, Colt requests that Beau communicate with Rooster. Later, Abby gives Colt a key to her house, saying he can come there at any time. Beau tries to settle the divorce papers with Maggie, but their lawyer gives up due to Maggie wanting to leave her share of the ranch to both kids, as Beau demands Rooster be left out. Rooster offers Colt a job on the new ranch, but he declines.
20	10	"Merry Christmas (Wherever You Are)"	David Trainer	Story by : Don Reo & Jim Patterson; Teleplay by : Matt Ross & Max Searle	October 7, 2016
Colt and Abby think ahead of their future as a soon-to-be family. Colt tells to Beau he is staying, but Beau wants to sell the ranch rather than agree to the divorce terms. Mary asks Rooster not to invite Umberto anymore as he fails to babysit her daughters' babies. Maggie agrees to Rooster's name being left out of the will after Rooster says it's better than Beau selling the ranch. Beau and Maggie finally sign the revised divorce paper containing the new terms. At a Christmas party in the bar, Colt gives Abby's family Broncos' playoff tickets as they witness Kenny dating the hot local television weather reporter, Tanya Showers. Mary catches Umberto and Darlene having sex at the bar and gives them her blessing. Joanne visits Beau and they give each other hats of each other's truck brand that they hate. Joanne is finally granted to see her daughter and granddaughter. Beau finally comes to the bar as the party is over. The kids give Maggie animal tap handlers symbolizing their nicknames and an old family picture. Colt gives Beau Ugg boots and he gives back a hug. Beau gives Rooster Grandpa's knife but he still cannot warm up to Beau, telling him he does not appreciate him enough. Colt is leaving to propose to Abby, but Heather is waiting outside to announce she's pregnant with his child.

=== Part 3 (2017) ===
No. overall	No. in part	Title	Directed by	Written by	Original release date
21	1	"My Next Thirty Years"	David Trainer	Story by : Don Reo & Jim Patterson; Teleplay by : Matt Ross & Max Searle	June 16, 2017
Colt reacts to Heather's pregnancy with disbelief. Maggie drives a very drunk Beau home to the ranch. Colt says nothing about Heather's pregnancy. Beau invites Maggie to stay the night since it is late, but she declines. She wants Beau to remain hopeful that Rooster will come back. At Mary's, Darlene is upset because her ex-boyfriend (and baby-daddy) Jason reneges on his commitment to get their son a bicycle for Christmas. Since all the stores are closed by this time, Rooster steals a bike for him. Colt is summoned to Abby's to meet her parents and go to a Christmas Eve church service together. Colt interacts awkwardly with them, then calls Rooster aside to tell him about Heather's pregnancy. On Christmas Day, Beau gives Colt a book of newspaper clippings about his football career. Colt breaks Heather's pregnancy news to Beau, and Beau advises him to do whatever it takes for his future child. Beau breaks the news to Maggie with a bottle of champagne they promised to open when they have their first grandchild. Colt speaks with Heather, telling her he really wants to do right by her and the baby. He attempts to propose her, but she tells him to stop. She tells him she's not ready to have a child, and that she plans to have an abortion.
22	2	"Things Change"	David Trainer	Story by : Steve Tompkins & Jeff Lowell; Teleplay by : Jamie Rhonheimer & Nathan Chetty	June 16, 2017
Heather confesses she doesn't love Colt, and she wouldn't want to raise a child with someone she doesn't love. After scolding him for having unprotected sex in the first place, Colt's parents tell him that Abby will find out about Heather's pregnancy one way or another, and that he should make sure she finds out from him. Mary shoots out Colt's truck windows in revenge for impregnating her daughter. Mary then kicks Rooster out of her house for not telling her about the pregnancy. Maggie offers to let Rooster stay in the hunting cabin on the ranch grounds that she got from Beau in the divorce. Though the cabin needs much work and cleaning to be habitable, Rooster needs a place to stay so he reluctantly accepts the offer. Abby drops by the ranch and wants to have sex with Colt, but he declines. Colt finally tells Abby about Heather's pregnancy, and she storms out in anger. Beau goes to the local hair salon and gets a haircut from Brenda, whom he had wrongly been accused of sleeping with some years ago (after Maggie left him and started living behind her bar). He agrees to take her out to dinner to repay her for the haircut.
23	3	"Take Me Away from Here"	David Trainer	Story by : Jim Patterson & Nathan Chetty; Teleplay by : Max Searle & Steve Leff	June 16, 2017
Abby leaves in anger and then Beau tells Colt they have to start work soon. Colt visits Rooster in the hunting cabin, where they talk and have a beer. Beau comes in with a gun and tells Rooster to get out. Rooster reminds him that Maggie got the cabin in the divorce, and the two agree to stay off each other's property. Dale visits Rooster at the My Little Pony ranch. Rooster finds out that Dale isn't on the ranch's approved veterinarian list, and that he has all kinds of reports due. Maggie comes over to see Colt and talks to him about Heather and Abby. Colt goes to Heather's to apologize for judging her, and says he'll support her decision. The next day, Colt drives Heather to the abortion clinic. Back at the bar, Maggie and Hank stroll in to find a huge leak, with water everywhere. Rooster arrives to help Maggie fix the pipe break over the bar. Soon after, Beau walks in with a heater to prevent the pipes from freezing again. Hank tells them that the food freezer is shorted out from the flooding water. Beau and Rooster argue so much that Maggie tells them this is a sign maybe she should sell the bar. At the clinic, Colt hands Heather his St. Christopher pendant for protection. Heather changes her mind and decides she wants to keep the baby. She and Colt leave together (stopping at Dairy Queen for a blizzard treat).
24	4	"She'll Have You Back"	David Trainer	Story by : Don Reo & Steve Leff; Teleplay by : Matt Ross & Nikki Schiefelbein	June 16, 2017
Colt returns home from Dairy Queen to find Abby waiting. Abby wants to make things work, but when Colt says Heather is having the baby, Abby gets angry again. Colt professes his love, saying he'll do all he can to be there for both Abby and the baby. Abby says she loves Colt, but is not looking forward to the awkward situation at dinner with her parents. She turns out to be right, because at dinner, her dad says right to Colt's face that his daughter can do better. Abby's mother agrees, and both parents storm out. Beau agrees to travel with Rooster to a cattle auction to save gas. At the auction, Dale joins them, creating an awkward situation for Rooster. Rooster and Beau are in competition for a bull. After Beau insults Rooster, calling him nothing more than a hired hand for his new ranch, Rooster overbids his father's limit for the bull. Beau refuses to drive Rooster home, and after finding out that Rooster can't hire him, Dale also refuses. As Abby drinks heavily at Maggie's, Heather walks in trying to order food. Abby makes condescending jokes about Heather getting pregnant with Colt, causing Heather to leave. Maggie brings a stumbling Abby to the ranch, where she falls asleep on the couch. Colt arrives home as Abby wakes up, and says he wants to show her something. He drives her to the town water tower, on which Rooster had painted "Fuck Colt". Abby sees that it now reads "Fuck, Colt Loves Abby". The two embrace. Back home, Colt tells Maggie he's not sure how he'll juggle work and being a dad while trying to maintain a relationship with Abby.
25	5	"My Best Friend"	David Trainer	Story by : Ashton Kutcher & Carla Filisha; Teleplay by : Steve Tompkins & Jamie Rhonheimer	June 16, 2017
Colt, Abby, Rooster and Berto are watching Tanya Showers promote an ice fishing tournament on Saturday, and all four agree to sign up. At work, Rooster finds out from Neumann's Hill rep Rich that the entire herd needs to be tagged by 9 AM Sunday. Rooster protests, saying his employees have been worked very hard and need a break, also mentioning the ice fishing tournament. Rich says they each must do what the guys who sign their checks are saying. Rooster agrees, but shows up at the ice fishing tournament anyway. Berto, who just bought a house, gets mad when he hears Rooster denied him a chance to earn some overtime. At a bar afterwards, an angry Rooster gets in a fight, and Colt and Berto jump in to help. All three end up in jail. Elsewhere, Beau takes Brenda to dinner, as he agreed to pay her back for the haircut. They have a good time and nice conversation, but stop short of agreeing to anything romantic. At the jail, Billy enters and says Berto is an illegal immigrant and is being deported. He reluctantly takes him away, apologizing and saying it's out of his hands.
26	6	"Find Out Who Your Friends Are"	David Trainer	Story by : Don Reo & Jeff Lowell; Teleplay by : Max Williger	June 16, 2017
Maggie and Beau are having a conversation about both Brenda and selling the bar, when Maggie gets a call from the jail. The two go to bail out the boys, and are later joined by Mary. Beau brings an antique rocking horse to Heather as a gift, saying that regardless of the circumstances, he's looking forward to a Bennett grandchild. Later, Heather brings one of Mary's apple pies to the ranch to thank Beau. Abby arrives right then, and she and Heather argue anew. Out of jail, Colt and Rooster work all night to get the herd tagged, while also hunting a mountain lion. After getting home, Colt gets Abby and Heather together for an honest conversation about their futures. This time, cooler heads prevail. At the bar, Jerry brings an offer to Maggie, but it's lower than the amount she was expecting. Maggie also learns the buyers plan to tear down the bar and put up an electric vehicle charging station. After talking with Beau, she tears up the offer. Back at work the next morning, Rooster tells Rich he got the herd tagged, but Rich tells him he's fired, citing getting an employee deported and driving a company vehicle while drunk, in addition to disobeying the order to work on Saturday.
27	7	"One of Those Nights"	David Trainer	Story by : Matt Ross & Max Searle; Teleplay by : Jim Patterson & Jason Zumwalt	June 16, 2017
Rooster asks Ed if he can get him his job back, but Ed says there's nothing he can do. As a snowstorm hits, Mary visits Rooster at the hunting cabin and learns he got fired. Soon after, a tree falls through a cabin window. Colt and Abby get in his truck to drive somewhere for her birthday, and Colt reveals he got her tickets for a Garth Brooks concert that night in Denver. At the ranch, Joanne and Beau have drinks and conversation, and are just starting to kiss when Mary knocks on the door. Mary pleads with Beau to invite Rooster to stay in the house, rather than let him spend a frigid night in the damaged cabin. Beau visits Rooster, and they argue about Rooster coming back to work. Rooster wants more leadership responsibility, but Beau says Rooster's firing means he's not ready yet. Colt and Abby find that the snow and traffic will prevent them from getting to Denver in time for the concert, and they dejectedly pull off the road to a bar & grill. At Maggie's bar, the snow has caused most customers to leave, so she decides to close early. One customer named Clint (Lou Diamond Phillips) is drinking club soda and is the last to leave. Maggie learns Clint is a musician who ruined his career with drinking and drugs. Clint plays a few songs on the house guitar while Maggie cleans up, and she offers to let him stay in the bar overnight. However, after Maggie goes back to retrieve a sleeping bag, she finds Clint gone and the till empty. Abby, trying to salvage a disappointing night at the bar & grill, asks the bar band to play "Friends in Low Places", which they do while she and Colt dance.
28	8	"I Didn't Ask and She Didn't Say"	David Trainer	Story by : Steve Tompkins & Nikki Schiefelbein; Teleplay by : Bryce VanKooten & William Vallery	June 16, 2017
Maggie offers to have Rooster run the bar, with the two of them splitting the profits, but Rooster says he has to think about it. Colt sees Heather with a date in the bar, and learns from Abby that the man is Paul, a young math teacher and wrestling coach at her school. Despite Heather's pleas to stay out of it, Colt visits Paul at the school to talk about plans to raise his child with Heather. Rooster visits Dale, and asks about doing any odd jobs for him. Dale says he can find him occasional work, with the first task being to relieve a constipated cow. When Rooster talks about his day with Maggie at the bar, she can see he is still passionate about ranching, and retracts her offer of the bar. Beau has a casual meal with Joanne to talk about their kiss and what it means. They agree that they are better off as friends, and make plans for Joanne to watch a movie with Beau at the ranch. While Colt, Abby and Beau are preparing dinner at the ranch, Heather walks in to confront Colt about what he said to Paul. After apologizing, Colt says he simply freaked out about another man being in his child's life. Later that night, Joanne watches a movie with Beau and leaves. When she comes back in for her keys, the two embrace and share a passionate kiss.
29	9	"Last Dollar (Fly Away)"	David Trainer	Story by : Jamie Rhonheimer & Nikki Schiefelbein; Teleplay by : Matt Ross & Max Searle	June 16, 2017
Following their kiss, Beau and Joanne agree they are more than friends, and make plans for a real date. Heather shows Colt an ultrasound photo of their child. She then says that, after insurance, she still owes the clinic $250. She and Colt agree they need to talk about who pays what for the child. Rooster arrives on his ATV and asks Colt for the truck, which he needs for another odd job. After Rooster leaves, Beau arrives to tell Colt the generator is out again. The two realize that Rooster always knew how to fix it. Clint shows up at the bar to pay back Maggie for the money he stole from the till, saying he needed it to get to his next gig, which would earn him enough to pay it back. Maggie thanks him for doing the right thing, but is not ready to forgive him. Clint still invites Maggie to his next gig in Grand Junction. Rooster fixes the generator while Beau is away, and Beau later gets mad with Colt for letting him. The two argue about Beau not letting Rooster come back to work. Beau goes to pick up Joanne for their date, but Joanne is watching her granddaughter because her daughter is in jail after getting arrested for her third DUI. With the added responsibility of caring for her grandchild, Joanne asks Beau to put their relationship on hold, saying family comes first. Inspired by this, Beau visits Rooster at the hunting cabin and offers to rehire him. Maggie watches Clint at his gig, and the two kiss after his last set. Colt arrives home late at the ranch, and tells Abby and Rooster that he took a second job stocking shelves at Safeway to support his child.
30	10	"Can't Really Be Gone"	David Trainer	Story by : Jim Patterson & Jeff Lowell; Teleplay by : Don Reo & Nathan Chetty	June 16, 2017
After watching Clint play his show and sleeping with him after, Maggie decides she wants to travel with him to his next gig in Albuquerque and live her dream of seeing the country. She returns home and tells her family her plans. After Jerry tells her that the previous offer for the bar has been retracted because the buyer purchased another property, Maggie asks Rooster to take over the bar, even though he just went back to work for Beau. This does not sit well with Beau, and he openly questions Maggie traveling with someone she just met. Maggie says she's doing this for herself, not for the guy. Colt and Abby are having difficulty finding time to connect with Colt working two jobs, and make plans to spend time that Friday afternoon. However, Heather tells Colt of her doctor appointment to learn the sex of the baby at the same time on Friday, and Colt feels obligated to go. He and Abby try to connect romantically twice, once in the Safeway break room and once at Abby's school, but someone walks in on them both times. At the ranch, Maggie is saying her good-byes to Beau and Rooster, when Colt walks in and joins them for a drink. Just then, Colt gets a call and learns that Heather was taken to the hospital.

=== Part 4 (2017) ===
No. overall	No. in part	Title	Directed by	Written by	Original release date
31	1	"Learning to Live Again"	David Trainer	Story by : Don Reo & Jim Patterson; Teleplay by : Jamie Rhonheimer & Nathan Chetty	December 15, 2017
Colt is in the kitchen making coffee when Brenda walks downstairs, having clearly spent the night with Beau. Beau doesn't want to talk about it, but it seems everyone in town soon knows the two of them hooked up. Colt learns that neighbor Sam is selling his ranch that's adjacent to Iron River, and also knows that Neumann's Hill made an offer. Colt convinces Sam to sell the property to him if he can come up with the money, even though Sam and Beau have been feuding for years. Beau and Rooster both think it's too risky and later, so does Abby. Abby also notes that Colt has been drinking heavily since Heather lost the baby three months ago. She arranges for Heather and Colt to talk. Colt breaks down to Heather, saying his first feeling after learning the baby was gone was relief, and he's wracked with guilt. Heather says she felt that too, adding that it's perfectly natural and doesn't make either of them a bad person.
32	2	"Wrapped Up in You"	David Trainer	Story by : Matt Ross & Max Searle; Teleplay by : Steve Tompkins & Jeff Lowell	December 15, 2017
Colt tells Beau he wants to propose to Abby, but says he had to pawn the ring he bought to pay some of Heather's medical bills. Beau gives his mother's ring to Colt, saying he just got it back from Maggie. At the bar, Billy's girlfriend Nikki complains about losing her job, so Rooster offers to have her waitress at the bar. As a thank-you, Billy offers Rooster backstage passes for the Thomas Rhett concert, where he will be working security. Colt convinces Rooster to give him the tickets so he can take Abby and propose to her in style. It turns out Nikki is a terrible waitress and always distracted, forcing Rooster to fire her. But Nikki then says she can get a lot of customers from her community college, and is rehired. At the ranch Beau and Brenda notice Dale is repeating things he just said more than normal, and are concerned. Dale later returns and scolds Beau for talking to his wife behind his back, but they soon learn that Brenda did that. At the bar, things are hopping with all the customers Nikki brought in, but Rooster is soon arrested by an undercover cop for serving minors. At the concert, Colt makes his move to get on stage and have Thomas Rhett read his proposal to Abby, only to be tackled by security and taken to the arena lockup. This doesn't stop him from proposing to Abby when she visits, and she says "yes".
33	3	"Rodeo and Juliet"	David Trainer	Story by : Don Reo & Max Searle; Teleplay by : Carla Filisha & Steve Leff	December 15, 2017
Despite Abby saying "yes" to his proposal, Colt realizes he still has to win over her father, which is no easy task. Rooster is forced to shut down the bar for three days, as he is unable to pay the fine for serving minors. He complains to Mary, who says he needs to take responsibility for his actions. Mary then tells Rooster she thinks their relationship has run its course, and because they aren't in love, they should break up. Jen, an engineer from the gas company, approaches Beau with a proposal to run a pipeline through the Iron River Ranch, which would mean a nice bit of cash. However, Beau must get permission from Sam Peterson to allow an access road through his property. The two rivals bicker anew about past issues, including Beau tearing down Sam's deer stand that he insists was on his property. When Beau gets the survey from the gas company, he sees that the stand was indeed on his property and not Sam's. But instead of holding it over Sam, Beau rebuilds the deer stand.
34	4	"Much Too Young (To Feel this Old)"	David Trainer	Story by : Jim Patterson & Matt Ross; Teleplay by : Jamie Rhonheimer & Nathan Chetty	December 15, 2017
At the bar, Abby tells the group that rival Norwood High School is closing, and the students will be attending Garrison High next year. Colt and Abby start planning their wedding, but seem to disagree on everything. Colt sees the huge binder that Abby prepared when she was engaged to Kenny, then tells Abby this isn't hers and Kenny's wedding, and that he has some ideas he wants heard. Beau sees that Joanne is back in town, and the two make a date for a friendly dinner. At Abby's suggestion, Beau is up front with Brenda, saying he and Joanne are just friends. However, when the dinner is over, Joanne says she still has romantic feelings for Beau, and cannot be around him if it's just friendly. Rooster meets a young woman named Jessie online. After a hookup, Rooster agrees to host a party in the hunting cabin for Jessie's friends. During the party, Rooster is put off by the immature friends and realizes he and Jessie have nothing in common. He visits Mary with hopes of getting back together. Mary insists they did the right thing breaking up, but praises Rooster for starting to value maturity in a relationship. Abby learns that it's not Norwood High that will be closing, it's Garrison.
35	5	"More Than a Memory"	David Trainer	Story by : Steve Tompkins & Steve Leff; Teleplay by : Jim Patterson & Jeff Lowell	December 15, 2017
Abby is despondent over the thought of losing her job when the school year closes. Colt tries to help, including getting Beau's permission for her to move into the ranch house, but this only seems to anger Abby as she ponders losing her own home. Jen, the gas company engineer, visits Rooster at the hunting cabin to say there will be workers coming around for the access road. Knowing there are guns in the cabin, she wants to make sure Rooster doesn't think the workers are intruders. Rooster invites Jen to Maggie's, but she says she has a boyfriend. Beau is conflicted when Brenda invites him to be her plus-one for a wedding, which will mean a weekend away, knowing he may still have feelings for Joanne. Jen visits Rooster at the bar, saying her boyfriend just broke up with her. After playfully insulting Rooster until closing time, Jen invites him to her hotel room. Beau visits Joanne to tell him he hasn't stopped thinking about her since she walked out of the ranch house. The two embrace and kiss.
36	6	"When You Come Back to Me Again"	David Trainer	Story by : Bryce VanKooten & William Vallery; Teleplay by : Matt Ross & Max Searle	December 15, 2017
Abby lands an interview, but it's in Denver, which leaves Colt conflicted. He wants Abby to find a job she loves, but doesn't want her to be six hours away. Jen tells Rooster their tryst was a one-time thing. Beau agrees that he shouldn't go any further with Joanne until he tells Brenda. However, when he visits Brenda at the salon, he learns it's the anniversary of her husband's death and decides it's a bad time. Maggie returns and is irritated that Rooster served a minor and forced the bar to be closed for three days. She fires him, telling him he's better off working for Beau again. Beau hires Rooster back, and Colt is later irritated to find out that his dad made Rooster his #2 again. This inspires Colt to go to Sam Peterson once again to make a last-ditch effort to buy his ranch. Brenda visits Beau to thank him for being so supportive at the salon, but she then finds out that Beau wants to be with Joanne.
37	7	"Do What You Gotta Do"	David Trainer	Jamie Rhonheimer & Nathan Chetty	December 15, 2017
Jen says they are close to finalizing the pipeline. Despite the rest of the family deciding to sign the agreement, Maggie makes plans to join an environmental group protesting the construction. Maggie learns about Abby getting a job offer in Denver, and assures Abby that she should be the one to tell Colt. However, Maggie accidentally lets the news slip out when talking to Colt. Later, the boys get a call that Maggie has been arrested during the pipeline protest.
38	8	"Big Money"	David Trainer	Story by : Matt Ross & Nathan Chetty; Teleplay by : Jeff Lowell & Nikki Schiefelbein	December 15, 2017
The boys bail Maggie out of jail, and she returns to a very angry Beau. Colt is upset that Abby still hasn't told him about Denver. Colt and Rooster discuss buying the Peterson ranch using the yearly operating funds for their own ranch, knowing the pipeline money will easily replace those funds. Beau is still against the idea, until Colt tells him about keeping the Iron River in the family for generations, convincing him that expanding the ranch is the only way to keep corporations like Neumann's Hill at bay. Beau finally agrees, and Colt and Rooster meet with Bill from the bank to get a loan approved. Later, Beau is chopping wood when he collapses in front of Colt.
39	9	"Ain't Goin' Down ('Til the Sun Comes Up)"	David Trainer	Story by : Steve Tompkins & Max Searle; Teleplay by : Jamie Rhonheimer & Nathan Chetty	December 15, 2017
Beau is rushed to the hospital, and learns he has blockage in his arteries and needs to go to Grand Junction for further tests. He stubbornly refuses. Colt blames Maggie for making Beau upset over the pipeline. Colt finally tells Abby he knows about the Denver offer. Abby says she accepted the job, making Colt angrier because she did so without consulting him. She assures him she will keep looking for a job closer to home, but Colt is still upset. Colt tells her about purchasing the Peterson ranch, which will give them a place to live and raise the family, but Abby says she loves teaching and a new home won't change that. Jen visits Rooster at the cabin and has too much to drink, but Rooster just lets her sleep. Maggie and Joanne finally convince Beau to get the tests done.
40	10	"If Tomorrow Never Comes"	David Trainer	Story by : Don Reo & Jim Patterson; Teleplay by : Matt Ross & Max Searle	December 15, 2017
As Maggie prepares to drive Beau to Grand Junction, Colt presses him on the Peterson ranch, saying they need to put in an offer the next day and Beau still hasn't signed the papers. Beau says things have changed, so he doesn't think it's a good idea to make the purchase. Jen and Rooster spend a day at a geology museum, wherein Jen tells him one Colorado Senator is joining the protest against the pipeline, but she is sure her company can make him back off with a big campaign donation. Abby tells Colt she starts the job in Denver on Monday. She leaves in her truck without kissing him. Colt has a drink with Jerry, and learns that Beau gave him power of attorney. Colt convinces Rooster to sign for the Peterson purchase. Beau and Maggie are joined at the hospital by Joanne. A few hours later, they learn Beau had a stent put in to fix a 98% blockage in the "widow maker" artery. As Colt and Rooster celebrate their purchase, Jen arrives and tells them the pipeline project has been halted.

=== Part 5 (2018) ===
No. overall	No. in part	Title	Directed by	Written by	Original release date
41	1	"Starting Over Again"	David Trainer	Story by : Matt Ross & Nathan Chetty; Teleplay by : Don Reo & Jim Patterson	June 15, 2018
After Jen leaves, Colt learns that Abby left for Denver without telling him. Abby is not returning his phone calls or texts, either. The boys visit Sam Peterson, hoping to get him to cancel the purchase, but Sam says he's already spent a lot of the money on his kids and grandkids. He says they could resell the property to Neumann's Hill. Relieved, the boys meet with Rooster's former colleague, Rich, who agrees to tell Neumann's Hill. Beau returns home with strict orders to take it easy. The boys walk in and tell him only that the pipeline project was shut down. Rich arrives and the boys go outside. He shows them the purchase agreement from Neumann's Hill, but the price is way lower than what they need. Rich tells them that his bosses sensed the boys were desperate to unload the land. The boys now have to tell Beau, and he explodes with anger. Abby finally takes Colt's call, and after it ends, she pulls out a pregnancy test from her pharmacy bag. Rooster blames Colt for persuading him against Beau's call, and tells Colt he never should have come home.
42	2	"It's All Wrong, But It's All Right"	David Trainer	Story by : Jeff Lowell & Nikki Schiefelbein; Teleplay by : Brian Keith Etheridge & Carla Filisha	June 15, 2018
Colt visits Abby in Denver, saying they should go to Mexico or somewhere else to restart their life. Abby insists their life is still in Colorado, and urges Colt to face his problems. She ponders telling Colt about her pregnancy test, but decides it's not the right time. At home, Beau and Rooster start looking for things to sell. Making matters worse, Dale tells Beau that the cattle on the Peterson ranch were not well cared for with Sam's health declining. Maggie pitches in and helps on the ranch. Rooster, in turn, tells Maggie he'll take some shifts at the bar while continuing to work on the ranch. At the bar, Rooster chats up an attractive woman, but gives up after learning she was only in town to protest the pipeline. Colt returns and attempts amends with Rooster, who (violently) accepts, and Beau, who refuses to talk further. Abby returns to Garrison for an Easter dinner with the Bennetts and her parents. When tempers start to flare, Abby blurts out that she's pregnant.
43	3	"A Gamble Either Way"	David Trainer	Story by : Jeff Lowell & Nikki Schiefelbein; Teleplay by : Brian Keith Etheridge & Carla Filisha	June 15, 2018
As Abby prepares to head back to Denver, Colt ponders what to do about the Bennett's dire financial situation and his pending child. Abby suggests they could borrow from her parents. Colt agrees, but insists it would be an investment in the Peterson ranch, not a loan. He pitches the idea to Abby's father, but he refuses and instead offers Colt a sales job at his John Deere dealer. Beau learns of the offer, and after reconciling with Colt, urges him to should take it. Mary visits Maggie and Rooster at the bar, and offers to wait tables for tips only. She later visits Rooster and the two flirt like old times, despite Mary telling Rooster she has a new boyfriend. Colt goes to the Deere dealer with the intent to accept the job, but when Abby's father talks about passing the dealer down to future generations, Colt thinks about the ranch and turns down the job. Abby's mother visits Colt later that night and gives him a check for the Peterson ranch, insisting that Colt not tell anyone who gave him the money. In a flash-forward to four months later, the Bennetts are preparing the ranch for a raging wildfire that is visible in the distance.
44	4	"Baby I'm Burning"	David Trainer	Story by : Jeff Lowell & Jamie Rhonheimer; Teleplay by : Steve Leff & Jessica Kravitz	June 15, 2018
As news of the wildfire is all over the television, the Bennetts seem sure that it will not move in their direction. Abby, now showing, tells Colt she wants to postpone the wedding until after the baby. This upsets both her parents and Colt, who don't want the baby being born out of wedlock. Colt later convinces Abby they can have a courthouse wedding, and have a celebration for family and friends after the baby. Abby agrees, and they ask Rooster to be their witness. Meanwhile, Beau visits his doctor, who says his LDL cholesterol is not coming down enough, and gives him a prescription for a different statin. At the pharmacy with Joanne, Beau learns the new medication will cost $130 a month even with insurance. He refuses to purchase the medication and leaves. Later, Joanne buys the medication for Beau, saying she won't stay with him if he doesn't take care of himself. As Abby and Colt wait for Rooster in the cabin so they can go to the courthouse, Rooster enters and tells them the wildfire shifted and they must evacuate now.
45	5	"Travelin' Prayer"	David Trainer	Story by : Don Reo & Jim Patterson; Teleplay by : Matt Ross & Nathan Chetty	June 15, 2018
The town evacuates to the high school. Maggie feels like the scene is chaos, so she takes charge. Colt sees Heather and has an awkward exchange about Abby being pregnant. Heather says she knows, and is happy for them. Rooster meets Mary's "boyfriend" Nick, who turns out to be her first and third ex-husband and Darlene's father that has been in prison. Rooster proposes that he can still be Mary's side piece, but she says that's over. Maggie announces that a group of people will be holding a prayer circle with the pastor and invites Beau, but he declines. Abby's parents, Chuck and Janice, show up without Abby, whom Colt says went to check on them before heading to the school. Worried, Colt and Chuck drive out to look for Abby. They encounter a blocked road due to fire jumping the main highway into town. At Chuck's prodding, Colt drives through the blockade, and they soon see Abby's truck. Back at the school, Beau walks alone into the classroom where the prayer circle was held. He sits down and begins to pray.
46	6	"Tie Our Love (In a Double Knot)"	David Trainer	Story by : Bryce VanKooten & William Vallery; Teleplay by : Jamie Rhonheimer & Lisa K. Nelson	June 15, 2018
Colt and Chuck find Abby's truck abandoned, but she soon drives up on a four-wheeler. She says the truck stopped and she walked to her parents' house to get gas, and they were gone. After apologizing to Maggie for his behavior, Beau gives Colt a long hug when he sees him return to the school with Abby. Rooster has a conversation with Mary in which he cautions her about her ex, Nick, but Mary insists Nick has changed. Later, Nick talks to Rooster and says he'll kill him if he doesn't stay away from Mary. Colt has a surprise for Abby: a wedding on the football field with all the town lighting it up with their headlights. With Maggie officiating, the two say their vows. Later, Chuck tells Colt he's reconsidered and wants to invest in the Peterson ranch, unaware that Janice has already done so.
47	7	"Telling Me Lies"	David Trainer	Story by : Steve Leff & Brian Keith Etheridge; Teleplay by : Nikki Schiefelbein & Carla Filisha	June 15, 2018
The morning after the fire, Billy announces that anyone who lives north of the school can return home. He then pulls aside Rooster and Colt, telling them their Bronco was seen on camera the day a generator was stolen from Neumann's Hill. When the family returns home, they find the barn burned but the Bennett house still okay. Abby and Colt aren't so lucky, as their future home on the Peterson ranch was burned to the ground. Abby tells Colt he should reconsider her father's investment offer. At the bar, Maggie gets a visit from her freeloading sister, Karen, who says she has cancer. Knowing her sister once lied about cancer to get money, Maggie is highly suspicious. Beau gets a visit from Lisa Neumann, who says the damage to their properties was severe, and offers to pay Beau to add a Neumann's Hill herd to the Iron River Ranch. The boys want Beau to gouge Neumann's Hill on the price, but he later tells Lisa that he will only charge her for expenses. Beau explains to his upset children that ranchers always help each other, no matter what. Chuck arrives and angrily confronts Colt about taking money from Janice and keeping it a secret. Then Colt learns Abby went behind his back and asked for her father's money. Maggie tells Beau she thinks Karen is being truthful about having cancer, as she didn't ask for money and only wants Maggie to go to Florida to help her through the treatments. Colt tries to get rid of the stolen generator, but is caught by police.
48	8	"Fresh Out of Forgiveness"	David Trainer	Story by : Don Reo & Jim Patterson; Teleplay by : Matt Ross & Nathan Chetty	June 15, 2018
Colt is arrested for being caught with the stolen generator, and Abby has to bail him out of jail with their honeymoon money. Colt angrily tells Rooster what happened, but Rooster blames Colt for being stupid and trying the dump the generator. Colt visits Lisa Neumann, reminding her that she owes the Bennetts a favor and asking her to drop the charges, which she does. Joanne visits Beau, telling him that her home was destroyed by the fire. Beau says she can stay at the ranch for as long as she needs. Rooster is having a drink at the bar and talking to Mary, who is bartending, when Nick walks in. He sits next to Rooster and subtly reminds him of their agreement. Later, Mary visits Rooster at the hunting cabin to have sex, saying that Nick is being a jerk. Colt tells Abby he now wants to know the sex of the baby, like she wanted previously, and shows her a balloon that is filled with pink or blue confetti. Abby says she's changed her mind and wants to wait to find out, but when Colt lets the balloon go, it accidentally pops and reveals pink confetti. Lisa Neumann talks to Beau at the ranch, and lets it slip that she won't press charges against Colt. Not knowing about the stolen generator and angry with Colt, Beau tells Lisa to press charges.
49	9	"It Ain't Fair that It Ain't Right"	David Trainer	Story by : Jamie Rhonheimer & Matt Ross; Teleplay by : Nathan Chetty & Jessica Kravitz	June 15, 2018
Colt learns Lisa is forced to charge him with the generator theft. After meeting with Jerry, Colt decides to take the rap and likely get probation, knowing that Rooster's history would surely earn him jail time. Mary wakes up in Rooster's cabin, and says she needs to make a final decision between him and Nick. Colt tells Beau that he is covering for Rooster. Beau is so angry with both of his kids, he tells them to take a day off from working on the ranch. Rooster starts drinking early, and upon returning to his cabin that night, finds Nick waiting for him. After Nick repeats his threats, Colt walks in. Outnumbered, Nick decides to leave. Rooster meets with Heather later, and urges her to tell her mom about Nick's threats, knowing that Nick forbade him to be near Mary. Beau tells Lisa he wants to sell the Peterson ranch.
50	10	"Change"	David Trainer	Story by : Jeff Lowell & Jamie Rhonheimer; Teleplay by : Don Reo & Jim Patterson	June 15, 2018
After pleading with Beau to make peace with his sons and being told to butt out, Joanne decides she'd rather stay at a motel than with Beau. Colt learns about Beau selling the Peterson property, and he approaches Lisa with a proposition: he would like to run the Peterson ranch for Neumann's Hill. He tells Lisa that he plans to make the ranch his family home, and therefore will work twice as hard as anyone else. Lisa agrees, as long as Colt can get his dad's blessing. Beau refuses, leading to him and Colt arguing. As Colt leaves, he tells Beau that he will soon have a granddaughter. Rooster finds Nick in his cabin again. This time, Nick has packed a bag and gives Rooster a choice: leave town or be shot and killed on the spot. Rooster chooses to leave. This marks the last episode that Danny Masterson appears in.

=== Part 6 (2018) ===
No. overall	No. in part	Title	Directed by	Written by	Original release date
51	1	"When It All Goes South"	David Trainer	Story by : Matt Ross & Max Searle; Teleplay by : Don Reo & Chris Iredale	December 7, 2018
Rooster is missing on his first day on the Peterson ranch. Colt has a rough first day on the ranch. Joanne loses her job and struggles finding a new one. Colt begins to worry about Rooster after he is not able to contact him. Convinced that Nick had something to do with Rooster's disappearance, Colt confronts him at his trailer.
52	2	"Reckless"	David Trainer	Story by : Nathan Chetty & Steve Leff; Teleplay by : Jim Patterson & Jeff Lowell	December 7, 2018
Colt and Nick are both are arrested after fighting. Mary finds out Nick is still in town, and she questions Nick about Rooster. Rooster's motorcycle is found at the bottom of a cliff, but the police cannot find a body. Colt and Beau have trouble accepting what may have happened to Rooster. After seeing the damage to the bike, Beau is convinced Rooster died, but Colt refuses to accept that. In anger, Colt goes after a wolf that killed a cow. After warning Colt to stay away from Nick, Beau beats Colt to Nick's trailer to run him out of town.
53	3	"If I Could Just See You Now"	David Trainer	Story by : Don Reo & Jim Patterson; Teleplay by : Matt Ross & Max Searle	December 7, 2018
Not sleeping and searching for Rooster, Colt tracks his credit card activity to a hotel in Norwood, but the manager hasn't seen Rooster in two days. The police find Rooster's wallet and a bit of bloody clothing down the river, but no body. While the family has a memorial for Rooster, Colt still doesn't believe he has died and won't attend. A special package arrives for Colt, and he then decides to attend the memorial, revealing the package was a Bennett Brothers Ranch sign Rooster had ordered before he disappeared.
54	4	"Changes Comin' on"	David Trainer	Story by : Nikki Schiefelbein & Lisa K. Nelson; Teleplay by : Jamie Rhonheimer & Steve Leff	December 7, 2018
Abby and Colt are under stress to get everything done with only a month left before the baby arrives. Maggie notices that the books aren't adding up at the bar. Mary blames it on the waitress, Maria, but Mary is later seen taking money from the till. Maggie tells Colt to do something for Abby before the baby is born. Lisa Neumann offers Beau a great deal and he tells Colt to take it, but he refuses because he sees it as an insult from Beau. Abby goes into labor as the episode ends.
55	5	"Born Country"	David Trainer	Story by : Brian Keith Etheridge & Nathan Chetty; Teleplay by : Jeff Lowell & Jamie Rhonheimer	December 7, 2018
Abby and Colt head to the hospital calling their parents on the way. Beau has to deal with loose cows while Maggie goes to the hospital. Colt stresses over the delivery and just being a dad. Mary brings bar food to the hospital for everyone. Maggie confronts Mary about the problems at the bar, catching her in a lie. Abby has to have an emergency C-section, making Colt more nervous with what can go wrong. The baby is born healthy, and Colt holds her for the first time. Beau finally gets to the hospital and holds his granddaughter, while telling Colt he is going to take the Neumann's Hill offer because his priorities have changed. Maggie sees Mary taking Xanax out of Janice's purse. Colt talks to the Bennett Brothers sign as his way of telling Rooster about the baby.
56	6	"Pass It on Down"	David Trainer	Story by : Jim Patterson & Don Reo; Teleplay by : Matt Ross & Max Searle	December 7, 2018
Abby and Colt struggle with being new parents to Peyton. A surprise visitor shows up and ends up being Beau's nephew, Luke. Maggie fires Mary for stealing from the bar. Luke wakes up the next day and comes out to help work on the truck, but reacts angrily when a light bulb explodes. Colt tells him to leave. Abby and Colt argue because both are lacking sleep while caring for the baby. Beau finds Luke and they talk about what happened. Beau recognizes Luke's reaction to loud noises as a symptom of PTSD, and Luke shares a horrible story from his time in Iraq. Beau invites him to stay with them. Colt takes the baby to let Abby get some sleep. As he falls asleep on the couch, Abby comes down later and joins them. Colt is upset that Luke is going to be staying at the ranch.
57	7	"Give Me One More Shot"	David Trainer	Story by : Nathan Chetty & Brian Keith Etheridge; Teleplay by : Bryce VanKooten & William Vallery	December 7, 2018
Luke tries to initiate a conversation with Colt, but Colt but tells him to stay away from his wife and kid. Abby and Colt talk about breastfeeding Peyton. Luke has a good first day working with Beau. Mary is caught going through the hunting cabin looking for drugs, and Maggie and Beau talk about what's going on. Luke tries to connect with Colt again over a stolen calf. Abby talks to Maggie about the breastfeeding problems she is having, saying she is ready to give up and start bottle-feeding. Luke and Colt go and get the calf back, and start to talk and make progress. Maggie visits Mary and offers help, but is turned down.
58	8	"Keep on Dreamin'"	David Trainer	Story by : Jeff Lowell & Carla Filisha; Teleplay by : Nikki Schiefelbein & Steve Leff	December 7, 2018
Beau signs his contract with Neumann's Hill, giving him a guaranteed price for his cattle. Abby finds out that Colt turned down the Neumann's Hill offer. Colt meets with a cattle buyer and the offer is too low. Now he has to tell Abby he messed up. Beau talks to Luke about helping him with PTSD, and offers to go a meeting with him. Colt goes back to Lisa Neumann, but her offer is no longer on the table. Colt confides in Luke that he messed up with his cattle and Luke tells him to talk to Beau. Beau goes to get Luke for the meeting but he is not there. Colt talks to Beau about helping him get more for his cows by selling them as Iron River cattle. Beau refuses, citing possible long-term damage to the brand. Colt lies to Abby about getting Neumann's Hill to buy his herd.
59	9	"Down This Road"	David Trainer	Story by : Jessica Kravitz & Carla Filisha; Teleplay by : Brian Keith Etheridge & Jamie Rhonheimer	December 7, 2018
Beau confronts Colt about lying to Abby, while Colt blames Beau for not giving him options. Luke wakes up at Mary's after a night of drinking and drugs. Janice watches Peyton, and when Colt comes home, she tells him that she needs the money back that she invested. Abby gets a job opportunity closer to home in Norwood, but ponders whether to interview or spend more time just being a mom. Beau and Luke talk about missing the meeting. Luke helps Colt work on the house. Abby gets the new job, and she and Colt celebrate by going out to dinner. Beau struggles with not having anything to do with selling his cattle, and Joanne tries to help him figure things out. Colt brings back his previous buyer, who now offers even less for the cattle. Colt rejects the deal. Abby tells Colt she's decided not to take the job at Norwood, because she wants to stay home with Peyton. Colt finally tells Abby that he hasn't sold the cattle, and had lied to her the whole time.
60	10	"We Can't Love Like This Anymore"	David Trainer	Story by : Matt Ross & Nathan Chetty; Teleplay by : Jim Patterson & Don Reo	December 7, 2018
Abby takes Peyton and leaves for her parents after Colt admits he lied to her. Beau confronts Luke about being with Mary and his PTSD. Luke refuses to go to meetings, so Beau fires him. Luke then visits Colt, and offers to invest in Colt's ranch to help him out. Joanne gets the money for her house and talks to Beau talk about rebuilding or not. Beau offers her to come live with him. Colt goes to talk to Abby and bring her a used minivan he bought by selling the Bronco. She tells Colt how completely betrayed she feels by him, and how he has a pattern of lying or not telling her everything. Lisa Neumann offers to buy out Beau's ranch, while he still runs it. Colt confronts Beau about selling out, reminding him of how he always insisted Iron River stay in the family. Colt finds out that Luke is with Mary, and warns that she will ruin him. Abby comes to talk to Colt, telling him that she can't get over the lies or trust him, and finally says she wants to separate.

=== Part 7 (2019) ===
No. overall	No. in part	Title	Directed by	Written by	Original release date
61	1	"Dying to See Her"	David Trainer	Story by : Matt Ross & Max Searle; Teleplay by : Jim Patterson & Don Reo	September 13, 2019
Peterson's cancer is in remission and he returns to find Colt rebuilding after the fire. Luke and Mary get married and go on a drinking and drugs binge. Abby asks Colt for space while staying with her parents, but he finds excuses to visit. Heather trains as a veterinary technician and shadows Dale as he examines Colt's cows. Dale reports that a bull Colt just bought is incapable of impregnating them, leaving Colt short of cash with no way to increase his herd. Colt declines Heather's request for help finding Mary and Luke. Lisa Neumann argues with Beau about management of his ranch, which is now part of Neumann's Hill. Colt attempts to purchase a bull from Lisa, but she refuses to sell. Beau tells Dale that Neumann's Hill requires him to use a different veterinarian, but Dale tells Beau their friendship will continue. Abby informs Colt she rented an apartment closer to her work. Colt denies Lisa's accusation that he stole a bull. Colt finds an open gate between his father's ranch and his, which allowed a bull to enter. Beau unconvincingly denies that he left the gate open, but expresses happiness that Colt has finally had something good happen.
62	2	"I Wish You'd Stay"	David Trainer	Story by : Jeff Lowell & Brian Keith Etheridge; Teleplay by : Jamie Rhonheimer & Nathan Chetty	September 13, 2019
Abby begins the move into her new apartment. Luke calls to say he is in jail and Mary has overdosed and is hospitalized. Beau, Joanne and Heather travel to Las Vegas to pick them up, but Colt refuses to go. Beau posts Luke's bail but refuses to listen to his explanation. Mary disregards the doctor's advice and leaves the hospital. Luke returns to Colt's ranch, but Colt refuses to take him back as a partner. Colt plans to sell some cows to generate enough cash to keep his ranch operating through the winter. Luke repays Beau, and says he will attend Veterans Administration-sponsored counseling, but Beau scoffs. Colt refuses Abby's request to attend a school book fair with her. Mary returns home and she and Luke discuss ending their quickie marriage but agree to remain friends. Luke spends most of his remaining cash buying Colt's cows at auction, restoring their ranching partnership. Luke makes amends with Beau, then visits Mary and discovers she is still using drugs. Colt relents and attends Abby's book fair, and they discuss the status of their marriage.
63	3	"Waitin' on a Woman"	David Trainer	Story by : Steve Leff & Carla Filisha; Teleplay by : Jessica Kravitz & Nikki Schiefelbein	September 13, 2019
To Colt's frustration, Luke makes a mistake while helping with artificial insemination. Mary asks Luke for help making overdue mortgage payments. Beau offers to help on Colt's ranch. Abby and Colt argue over visitation. Dale tells Beau that the owner of the feed store died, causing Beau to consider his own mortality. Beau argues with Colt over whether a cow is having an allergic reaction. Luke gives Heather $1,000 so she can pay the mortgage. Dale says Colt's sick cow is recovering after receiving epinephrine, revealing that Beau saved it by disregarding Colt's assessment of its condition. Abby works late, irritating Colt by denying him time with Peyton. Joanne counsels Colt that rather than be upset with Beau, he should be willing to listen to the advice of an experienced rancher. Heather tells Luke that Mary withdrew the money and fled, leaving nothing for the mortgage. Colt apologizes to Beau and says he should have been grateful for Beau's wisdom. Beau apologizes for acting on his own, but reminds Colt that he became successful only after making numerous mistakes, which he wants Colt to avoid. Abby brings Peyton for her first overnight with Colt. Beau proposes to Joanne.
64	4	"Remind Me"	David Trainer	Story by : Bryce VanKooten & William Vallery; Teleplay by : Matt Ross & Max Searle	September 13, 2019
Joanne refuses Beau's proposal. To Colt's irritation, Luke says he arrived late for work because he was searching for Mary. Luke says Colt's tractor has a cracked engine block, meaning expensive repairs. Despite his misgivings, Colt gives Luke suggestions for finding Mary. Joanne confesses to Beau that she turned down his proposal because she has early stage Alzheimer's disease and announces she is moving to Arizona to live with her daughter. Colt hits on the idea of crowdsourcing the sale of his cows, increasing profits by dealing directly with customers. Mary's family is evicted. Mary is still missing, and took Heather's car, so Heather reports it stolen as a way to find her. Abby creates Colt's profile for the crowdsourcing website. Mary is arrested and Luke and Heather decline to post bail, hoping time in jail will restore her sobriety. Beau visits Joanne in Arizona and promises to stay with her no matter where she lives. Abby and Colt check the website and see several pre-orders for beef, indicating that crowdsourcing is viable. Happy at their success, they spend the night together. Mary's ex-husband Nick posts her bail.
65	5	"Love and War"	David Trainer	Story by : Jim Patterson & Don Reo; Teleplay by : Jamie Rhonheimer & Jeff Lowell	September 13, 2019
Colt and Abby wake up together. Before she leaves for work they find more pre-orders on the crowdsourcing site. Luke and Heather discover Mary has been released from jail. Abby drops off Peyton and declines Colt's dinner invitation but promises to stay the following night to watch football. Luke reports that the stream which provides water to Colt's ranch has gone dry. Mary and Nick break into her foreclosed house to recover her pill stash. Luke, Colt, and Beau find the stream is blocked by a Neumann's Hill dam. Dale tells Joanne that when Charlene was diagnosed with Parkinson's disease, it motivated them to travel and do other activities they had long deferred. Lisa declines to remove the dam, saying her ranches need the water for alfalfa and other crops. She tells Colt he can dig a well, oblivious to what it would cost. Heather and Luke meet Mary at the bar to return the personal items they saved for her during the eviction, but Mary refuses to consider entering rehabilitation for her drug abuse. Based on Dale's advice, Joanne proposes and Beau accepts. Abby finds that Colt arranged for them to be alone while watching football and tells Colt she is not ready to move back in, resulting in another argument.
66	6	"The Devil Is Alive and Well"	David Trainer	Story by : Nathan Chetty & Nikki Schiefelbein; Teleplay by : Carla Filisha & Brian Keith Etheridge	September 13, 2019
Beau and Joanne tell Colt and Luke they have decided to marry as soon as possible and allow Luke to plan a ceremony at the Bennett house. Abby arrives to pick up Peyton, Colt is curt with her, and she again refuses to move back in, so Colt tells her they have nothing more to discuss. Jerry tells Colt that he and the other affected ranchers have a good case against the dam, because a neighboring private ranch also has rights to the river. He plans to ask a judge to issue an injunction against Neumann's Hill that prevents them from damming the stream while the court case is pending. Joanne is frustrated when she believes her Alzheimer's symptoms may be affecting her memory. Abby suggests marriage counseling, but Colt refuses. Colt pleads with Lisa to remove the dam, but she refuses and hints at paying off people to drag the court case out so long that the affected ranchers will go out of business. Jerry later tells Colt the judge denied the injunction. Mary shows up for the wedding uninvited and embarrasses herself before angrily storming off. Beau and Joanne get married in front of friends and family, but Colt and Luke disappear for a short time. Colt says that if Abby will not move back in, he wants a divorce.
67	7	"Last Time for Everything"	David Trainer	Story by : Don Reo & Jessica Kravitz; Teleplay by : Jim Patterson & Steve Leff	September 13, 2019
Colt and Abby continue arguing, but Colt remains firm in requesting a divorce. Billy tells Colt and Luke that someone blew up the dam the night before. Colt claims he was at the wedding and then alone with Abby. Colt admits his guilt to Beau, touching off a heated argument. Joanne gets defensive about forgetting to pick up Colt's Muscle Milk at the grocery store. Colt asks Abby to provide his alibi but she says she will not lie for him. Mary tells Luke she used heroin. Luke agrees to take her to a rehabilitation facility. Joanne requests that if she can no longer care for herself, Beau help end her life. Janice advises Colt to fight to save his marriage. Luke and Mary stop for fuel and Mary steals Luke's truck. Beau and Joanne play memory-related games to slow the onset of her symptoms. Beau agrees that if necessary he will help Joanne die with dignity. Abby tells the police Colt was with her after the wedding but having given up trying to fix things with him, Abby gives Colt divorce papers. Lisa reveals to Colt that a game camera filmed him destroying the dam. She says she will give the evidence to the police unless he sells his ranch to her.
68	8	"Without a Fight"	David Trainer	Story by : Jeff Lowell & Jamie Rhonheimer; Teleplay by : Max Searle & Matt Ross	September 13, 2019
Colt tells Beau and Abby Lisa has evidence Colt destroyed the dam. They again counsel Colt to sell her his ranch. Abby and Colt inch closer to divorce. Bar patrons buy drinks for Colt and he realizes his fellow private ranchers consider him a hero for fighting Neumann's Hill. Colt tells Luke about Peterson's old El Camino and suggests Luke get it running to replace the truck Mary stole. Joanne and Beau consider traveling, but Beau does not like any of the proposed destinations. Luke is frustrated while working on the El Camino and erupts at Beau. Colt offers to sell his ranch to Lisa only if she agrees not to reconstruct the dam. She refuses. Beau and Abby again counsel Colt to sell to Lisa so he can avoid criminal charges, disappointing Colt, who says everyone supports him but the people whose approval he needs most. Luke apologizes to Beau for yelling at him. Beau gives Luke Pedro's tools, replacing the ones Luke lost when Mary stole his truck. Beau and Luke get the El Camino running. Colt is arrested. Beau offers to sell Lisa the Iron River Ranch in exchange for her dropping the charges against Colt.
69	9	"Welcome to the Future"	David Trainer	Story by : Steve Leff & Jessica Kravitz; Teleplay by : Carla Filisha & Nathan Chetty	September 13, 2019
Colt is released from jail, but strongly disapproves of Beau's decision to sell Iron River to Lisa Neumann. Rich tells Colt Lisa fired him, and he now works as a buyer for Outback Steakhouse. He offers to buy 400 head of cattle, more than Colt has, and agrees to let Colt try to arrange a sale by combining with other independent ranchers. Beau tells Colt to be careful in brokering the deal with Outback, which Colt misinterprets as criticism. Joanne advises Beau to be more supportive of Colt. Lisa makes higher offers for the herds of Colt's allies, jeopardizing his Outback deal. Mary wants to stay in the hunting cabin with Luke because she is not safe in her current situation, but Luke refuses and kicks her out. Colt signs the divorce papers and gives them to Abby. Beau reminds Colt that his main character trait has always been his refusal to quit, remembering aloud how Colt could make successful football plays out of seemingly impossible situations. Colt makes another pitch to the independent ranchers, who agree to stick with him. Colt rescues Beau's Iron River branding iron from the trash and asks to carry on the name at his ranch, and Beau approves.
70	10	"Perfect Storm"	David Trainer	Story by : Jim Patterson & Brian Keith Etheridge; Teleplay by : Don Reo & William Vallery	September 13, 2019
Colt tells Beau and Luke he signed the divorce papers. Abby and Colt agree to work out a relationship that prioritizes Peyton. Joanne and Beau consider traveling to Spain, but Beau disapproves and scoffs at Joanne's other suggested destinations. Abby and Colt debate who will have Peyton for Thanksgiving, their first major post-separation holiday. Colt, Luke, and Beau travel to an Indian casino in New Mexico. The El Camino runs out of gas because of a defective gauge, leaving them to drink beer on the side of the road while awaiting help. At a pharmacy, Abby sees Mary attempt to fill a phony prescription and then sees that Nick is with Mary. Colt tells Beau marrying Joanne is the best thing that has happened to him and he ought to travel anywhere she likes. Beau agrees and says they will visit Spain or anywhere else she wants to go. After Beau, Luke and Colt return home, Abby reports that Nick has returned and that she knows where he and Mary are staying. Luke remembers Mary's comment about not being safe, and now thinks she was talking about Nick. An armed Beau heads for Nick's trailer, followed by Luke. Abby pleads for Colt to stay, but he follows Luke. Nick arrives home and enters, followed by a gunshot.

=== Part 8 (2020) ===
No. overall	No. in part	Title	Directed by	Written by	Original release date
71	1	"It Ain't My Fault"	David Trainer	Story by : Matt Ross & Jeff Lowell; Teleplay by : Justin Mooney & Jesse Jensen	January 24, 2020
Two hours before the gunshot, Beau, Luke and Colt arrive at Nick's trailer. They find only Mary inside, injured after fighting with Nick. Luke brings Mary to Beau's house while Beau and Colt wait for Nick. Joanne, Abby and Heather are at the ranch house waiting for Mary. Beau tries to talk Colt out of killing Nick, but Colt mentions Rooster and wants to stay. Colt eventually agrees to leave after pulling Peyton's pacifier out of his pocket. Beau and Colt leave the trailer separately. Colt receives a phone call while driving home and turns around. Beau arrives home and says Colt should have beat him there. Deputy Wilkerson arrives at Nick's trailer. Colt exits and tells him Nick is dead inside. Wilkerson arrests Colt and brings him to the sheriff's office. Colt tells Billy he didn't kill Nick. The police realize Colt has an alibi and release him. Back at his home, Colt makes a phone call and tells the other person, "It's okay, no one knows you did it."
72	2	"Like It's the Last Time"	David Trainer	Story by : Jamie Rhonheimer & Nathan Chetty; Teleplay by : Nikki Schiefelbein & Brian Keith Etheridge	January 24, 2020
Beau says the sale of the Iron River ranch to Neumann's Hill is final, and the Bennetts must leave the family home in 60 days. Abby tells Colt she and Peyton will spend Thanksgiving with her family. Luke brings Mary to a Denver drug rehabilitation facility and helps her check in. Joanne flies to Buffalo to spend Thanksgiving with her sister. Colt, Beau and Luke decide to conduct one last turkey hunt on the ranch property before turning it over to Neumann's Hill. Beau is questioned about Nick's death, and Luke later says police want to talk to him. Colt asks if the police have any leads, and learns they do not. Beau, Luke and Colt unsuccessfully attempt to recover an old pickup truck Beau abandoned in the woods many years ago. Beau and Colt reminisce about life in the Bennett house, with Beau telling a poignant story about the old truck. Luke, Beau and Colt celebrate Thanksgiving with TV dinners. Abby brings Peyton to Beau's house, saying she insisted her family eat early so Colt could spend time with his daughter on the holiday.
73	3	"Out of Sight"	David Trainer	Story by : Carla Filisha & Max Searle; Teleplay by : Jessica Kravitz & Bryce VanKooten	January 24, 2020
Colt works to make sure his herd is ready to withstand a severe cold snap. Abby invites Colt to dinner for his birthday, but insist it's not a date. Luke says police questioned him about Nick's murder. Colt's deal with Outback is threatened when one of the other ranch owners says he plans to feed his herd grain instead of hay. Beau and Joanne argue about whether Joanne should drive to Arizona alone to visit her daughter and granddaughter. Colt's Outback partners agree to share hay and windbreaks during the bad weather. As Colt's partner, Luke wants to be included in decisions affecting their ranch, which Colt rejects. Dale advises Beau on helping Joanne cope with her Alzheimer's disease without taking away her independence. Because Luke refuses to help, Colt attempts to install windbreaks alone. His truck rolls away and pins him against one, and he is unable to move. Abby and Luke search together while Beau and Joanne also try to find Colt when he won't answer his phone. Colt is becoming delirious and nearing death from the cold.
74	4	"Fadeaway"	David Trainer	Story by : Jim Patterson & Don Reo; Teleplay by : William Vallery & Matt Ross	January 24, 2020
Colt continues to fade toward a cold death. As Beau and Joanne look for him, Joanne has an episode where she briefly thinks they are looking for her daughter. Colt dictates a farewell note to Siri on the phone that he can't reach, which is all about Abby and Peyton. He then hears Rooster talking to him (in Siri's voice), telling him to come toward the light. The light is from Luke's El Camino, as he and Abby have arrived to rescue him. In the hospital, Abby reads the note Colt dictated. Colt has mild frostbite and some bruised ribs, but will be okay. Beau talks to Joanne about her episode, and she admits she's not taking the medication her doctor prescribed. Beau is briefly angry, but understands her explanation. He later reveals he's bought their plane tickets to Spain. Abby surprises Colt with a belated birthday dinner. One of the gifts she gives him is their divorce papers, which she says she couldn't bring herself to send in for processing. The two profess their love for each other.
75	5	"Born to Love You"	David Trainer	Story by : Nikki Schiefelbein & Jamie Rhonheimer; Teleplay by : Steve Leff & Nathan Chetty	January 24, 2020
After Abby spends the night with him, Colt tells her he plans to be honest and prove that she can trust him. Beau and Joanne go house hunting and find a bank foreclosure in their price range that meets all their criteria, but Beau still finds reasons to not move there. He soon relents and decides to sign the offer with Joanne, only to have the bank up the price because of higher offers. A furious Joanne decides to not offer the higher price. Colt decides to tell Abby he knows who killed Nick, assuring her it was done by a good person who had justified motives. He asks Abby if she wants to know and put herself at risk of a cover-up charge like himself, and she refuses. Joanne has another episode making Beau feel like she shouldn't drive to Arizona alone to visit her daughter and granddaughter, but he ultimately says he trusts her.
76	6	"Not Everything's About You"	David Trainer	Story by : Brian Keith Etheridge & Max Searle; Teleplay by : Carla Filisha & Jeff Lowell	January 24, 2020
Luke convinces Colt to take a cow to a show, but after they arrive, the cow miscarries its calf, and Colt blames Luke. Colt later learns from Dale that four other cows have miscarried, and that all the cows tested positive for trichomoniasis (trich). Colt realizes all five cows with trich were impregnated by the Neumann's Hill bull that previously entered his property. Maggie returns from Florida with news that her sister died from cancer. Luke finds Mary in the ranch house. He scolds her for leaving rehab early and says he needs to take her back, but not until he takes her up on her offer of sex.
77	7	"What Was I Thinking"	David Trainer	Story by : Matt Ross & Nathan Chetty; Teleplay by : Nikki Schiefelbein & Steve Leff	January 24, 2020
Luke convinces Mary that she needs to go back to rehab and finish her program. Colt learns from Billy that a gun was found in the woods near Nick's trailer. He tells Abby, making her nervous. Maggie announces that after Peyton's baptism and the holidays, she is going to live in Florida, but promises to visit often. She describes a group of people in a co-op she's been living with, which is essentially a commune. This doesn't sit well with Beau, especially when Maggie says she plans to sell the bar and her Airstream and give the money to the co-op because they share everything. Colt also confronts her about using the money that way when he's broke, but Maggie cites the lifelong sacrifices she made for Colt and Rooster. Luke brings Mary by the ranch house on their way to rehab when Wilkerson arrives and arrests Luke for Nick's murder. Heather later comes by to see Mary, and she confesses to killing Nick when he came at her in the trailer. She then apologizes to Colt, forcing Colt to admit his cover-up. After a conversation with Abby, Colt says he's done living lies, and wants to tell the police what happened. He and Heather go to the police station, only to learn that Mary took the rap for killing Nick.
78	8	"Helluva Life"	David Trainer	Story by : Bryce VanKooten & Carla Filisha & William Vallery; Teleplay by : Don Reo & Jamie Rhonheimer & Nathan Chetty	January 24, 2020
Out of jail, Luke is visited by his Army buddy, Koosh. Jerry has a conversation with Heather, Colt and Beau, wherein he says Mary may have a better case for self-defense, given Nick's abuse. Koosh and Luke have a few beers and reminisce about Iraq, when Koosh offers his friend a job as a mechanic at his custom car shop in Chicago. Colt worries about Lisa Neumann bringing a potential lawsuit against his ranch, as she blames Colt's cows for giving her herd trich via her bull. Maggie tells Beau another reason she is returning to Florida, saying she met someone. Further, the "someone" is a woman named Julie. Luke tells Colt about Koosh offering him a dream job, and Colt expresses his anger. Colt later returns and tells Luke he should take the job, but Luke says he already told Koosh "no". Beau convinces Joanne they should use the money they saved for the down payment on their house to bail out Mary.
79	9	"Dumb Effin' Luck"	David Trainer	Story by : Jessica Kravitz & Steve Leff; Teleplay by : Jim Patterson & Jeff Lowell & Brian Keith Etheridge	January 24, 2020
As Colt and Abby prepare for Peyton's baptism, they ask Maggie to be the godmother, which upsets Janice. Colt learns that Lisa Neumann is suing him. If he loses the case, he knows he will lose the ranch to Lisa. Colt also faces a long day at work with Luke being a no-show, as Abby repeatedly pushes him to get ready for the baptism. When the time comes and everyone is waiting for him at the church, Colt has a cow in labor and says he can't make it. Beau leaves the church and goes to confront Colt, saying the cow may not deliver for hours, but Colt is adamant that he can't lose even one more calf. Luke shows up at the church after the baptism is over, obviously drunk. Maggie takes him back to the hunting cabin, finding Mary there waiting. Luke tells Mary that Koosh committed suicide, and contemplates his own fate. Mary pleads with Luke to get help, saying she doesn't want him to die. Colt returns to the ranch late, and Beau shows him pictures of him and Rooster in an album. He points out that he (Beau) isn't in any of the photos, and doesn't want Colt making the same mistake with his family. Colt gets into bed with Abby, and says he should just sell to Lisa Neumann and get a regular job. Abby won't hear of it, and urges Colt to fight. Luke shows up the next morning and tells Colt and Beau about Koosh. He then tells Beau he's finally ready to go to a veterans support group meeting.
80	10	"Take Me Home, Country Roads"	David Trainer	Story by : Matt Ross & Max Searle; Teleplay by : Jim Patterson & Don Reo	January 24, 2020
Having given their house money to bail out Mary, Beau and Joanne prepare to live in Colt's house. Abby and Colt try to get the house ready for a Christmas party, with Lisa Neumann's lawsuit still hanging over them. Luke and Beau attend their first veterans group meeting. Mary visits the ranch and returns the bail money to Joanne, saying she got probation only. Maggie holds a celebration at the bar, as she has sold the property and will be leaving after the New Year. While Abby and Colt have a drink, Abby talks about her mother still tracking her phone. Something strikes Colt and he leaves. He visits Lisa Neumann and shows her a Facebook photo of her bull on the neighboring Mooney ranch, taken before the bull was on Colt's property. The Mooney ranch also now has cows with trich. Lisa says there's no way Colt can prove the date of the photo. That's when Colt tells her that Rooster's profile is still active in Neumann's Hill's computer system, and Colt was able to get in using Rooster's favorite password: coltsucks. Knowing that Rooster tagged all the Neumann's Hill cattle when he worked for them, Colt now has proof of the bull's movements. Back home, Colt and Beau exchange Christmas gifts. Beau gives Colt tickets for the whole family to go to Disney World, while Colt gives Beau the keys to his ranch house. Beau is dumbfounded, until Colt explains that Lisa Neumann dropped her lawsuit. Knowing she desperately needs clean cows, Colt sold her his entire herd. The price: Lisa must return the Iron River ranch to Beau. Beau is overcome with emotion and embraces Colt. As the family celebrates, Maggie remarks that Rooster is probably looking down on them and smiling, while bragging to Jesus that he has a better beard.
