= Starting Over Again (2015 film) =

- Theatrical movie poster
- Directed by: Ruggero Gabbai
- Written by: Ruggero Gabbai; Francesca Olga Hasbani; Elliot Malki; Chiara Passoni
- Produced by: Elliot Malki
- Cinematography: Massimo Schiavon, Emilio Giliberti
- Edited by: Cristian Dondi; Francesca Olga Hasbani
- Production company: Forma International
- Release dates: December 2015 (Jerusalem Film Festival); June 2016 (Italy); August 2016 (Israel)
- Running time: 64 minutes
- Country: Italy
- Languages: Italian; English; French

For the 1980 Dolly Parton song of the same name see Starting Over Again.

Starting Over Again is a 2015 documentary film directed by Ruggero Gabbai and produced by Elliot Malki. The film is about the exodus of the Egyptian Jews between 1948 and 1956. Filming took place in Paris, London, Milan, New York City, Washington, Tel Aviv, and Jerusalem, starting in 2014. The documentary was selected at the Jerusalem Film Festival of 2015.

== Synopsis ==
Before 1948 kids received a cosmopolitan education and in Cairo there were 33 different schools: the Italian, French, English, Greek, Protestant, Catholic, Jewish, among many others.

The Jews of Egypt and many Europeans were permanently expelled from the country. Twenty pounds to survive were given to each person by the police authorities.
