= Joe Reaiche =

Australian rugby league footballer (1958–2024)

Personal information
- Full name: Joseph Anthony Reaiche
- Born: 20 March 1958 Redfern, New South Wales, Australia
- Died: 4 September 2024 (aged 66) London, England

Playing information
- Position: Fullback, Wing
Club
Years	Team	Pld	T	G	FG	P
1978–79	Eastern Suburbs	21	4	41	0	94
1981	Canterbury Bulldogs	1	1	0	0	3
1982	South Sydney	2	0	0	0	0
1983	Eastern Suburbs	1	0	0	0	0
	Total	25	5	41	0	97
- Relatives: Alanna Masterson (daughter); Jordan Masterson (son); Danny Masterson (stepson); Christopher Masterson (stepson)

Joseph Reaiche (/ˈriːʃ/ REESH; 20 March 1958 – 4 September 2024) was an Australian rugby league footballer who played in the 1970s and 1980s. He played in the New South Wales Rugby League Football Competition (NSWRL). He debuted his rookie year with the Eastern Suburbs Roosters rugby league team (now the Sydney Roosters) in 1978, then with the Canterbury-Bankstown Bulldogs and the South Sydney Rabbitohs.

Of Lebanese Australian heritage, Reaiche later relocated to Florida to work for the Church of Scientology, subsequently leaving years later. Reaiche was the father of actors Alanna Masterson and Jordan Masterson.

== Early life and education ==
Reaiche was born in the suburb of Redfern in Sydney, Australia; he was the middle sibling of a younger brother and sister and two older sisters. He began playing rugby league with his brother Tony with the local kids at Redfern Park adjacent to Redfern Oval, home to the South Sydney Rabbitohs. The two brothers would watch the Rabbitoh games by climbing the Oval's 10-foot high barbed wire fence.

By the age of 10 Reaiche went to St Mary's Cathedral College, Sydney a Roman Catholic Secondary School in the city, where he played in his first official Rugby League team. He also was selected to play representative district football for the Sydney Roosters Juniors.

=== Time in Lebanon ===
In October 1972, Reaiche and his family moved to Beirut, Lebanon. Reaiche attended the Good Shepherd Secondary Institute (GSSI) School in the suburb of Achrafieh. Reaiche and his brother played soccer with the school's team while teaching the other students how to play Rugby League.

== Professional career ==
In 1977, Reaiche returned to playing Rugby League. He captained the Christian Brothers' High School, Lewisham First's XIII Rugby League team. That year he was the highest point scorer in the metropolitan college league division, and was awarded "Best & Fairest Player" by Rugby League player Ron Coote. Later that year, the school team lost its coach due to an unexpected death, so Joe took over the coaching job and led the team to victory in the Metropolitan Catholic Colleges Sports Association (MCC) Final at Henson Park defeating Marcellin College Randwick, where he scored 13 of the team's 25 points in their 25-15 victory.

In January 1978, at the age of 19, Reaiche was drafted into the Eastern Suburbs Roosters Rugby League Squad, where he played in their First Grade team with notable players such as Arthur Beetson, Bob Fulton, Russell Fairfax, Mark Harris, Bill Mullins and Kevin Hastings. In 1981, he played for the Canterbury Bulldogs, where he played alongside the Mortimer Brothers (Steve Mortimer, Peter and Chris), the Hughes Brothers (Graeme Hughes, Mark and Gary) and the Gearin Brothers (Steve Gearin; Paul and Greg) - who all went to Christian Brothers' High School, Lewisham.

In 1982, he played first grade for the South Sydney Rabbitohs.

== Personal life ==
During his rugby league career, Reaiche began practising Scientology. After finishing his final year in 1983 with the Sydney Roosters, he relocated to Clearwater, Florida, to join the Church of Scientology's elite Sea Org. While a Scientologist, he met Carol Masterson, who had two children: Danny (b. 1976) and Christopher (b. 1980). Reaiche and Masterson married in 1985, and had two children together, a son Jordan (b. 1986) and a daughter Alanna (b. 1988).

Reaiche and his wife left the Sea Org in 1986 and moved to California in 1993 to further their children's acting careers, with Masterson as the children's manager. Reaiche and Masterson divorced in 1995. Both remained active in the Scientology, but in 2005 Reaiche was expelled and declared a "suppressive person". As a result, Reaiche was estranged from his children and stepchildren, who all remained Scientologists. The family 'disconnected' from Reaiche under orders from the Church of Scientology.

In a 2010 interview with Four Corners, Reaiche claimed to have spent around a half million dollars on Scientology over three decades. He accused the Church of Scientology of framing him for supposed financial misconduct as a pretext for expelling him, after he complained about its management and fundraising practices. Reaiche denied the allegation, and supported a review of the Church's favorable tax status in Australia, saying, "[Scientology]'s not really a church... it may have a philosophy that's religious, but it's strictly business."

Reaiche worked in the insurance and health industry.

=== Death ===
On 4 September 2024, Reaiche died of kidney failure during a business trip to London, at the age of 66. His brother, Tony, confirmed the news.
