= I'd Rather Eat Glass =

1999 studio album by Bijou Phillips

Studio album by Bijou Phillips
- Released: May 11, 1999
- Recorded: 1998–1999
- Genre: Pop rock; alternative rock
- Length: 50:43
- Label: Almo Sounds
- Producer: Jerry Harrison

Singles from I'd Rather Eat Glass
- 1. "When I Hated Him (Don't Tell Me)" Released: April 27, 1999

Professional ratings
Review scores
Source	Rating
AllMusic	2.5/5 stars
Entertainment Weekly	B

I'd Rather Eat Glass is the only studio album by American actress, model and singer Bijou Phillips, released on May 11, 1999, by Almo Sounds. It also remains her only full-length music release to date. The album's title refers to her past as a fashion model, saying she would "rather eat glass" than go back to modeling. Produced by Jerry Harrison, I'd Rather Eat Glass is an alternative pop rock album with post-grunge, folk and trip hop elements. Phillips collaborated with a number of artists when writing songs for the album, including Eric Bazilian, Greg Wells, Dave Bassett, Howard Jones, and Jill Cunniff.

Upon its release, I'd Rather Eat Glass received mixed reviews from music critics, mostly criticising the work for being immature. Her musical style has been compared to Natalie Imbruglia or Kay Hanley of Letters to Cleo.

"When I Hated Him (Don't Tell Me)" was released as the lead single from the album. Directed by Lori Hoeft, the music video was shot in a trailer park where Phillips portrays a stripper who caught her boyfriend cheating on her. "Hawaii" was released as a promotional single. The song "Polite" was featured on the soundtrack to the film I Still Know What You Did Last Summer (1998).

== Track listing ==
No.	Title	Writer(s)	Length
1.	"Hawaii"	Bijou Phillips; Eric Bazilian	4:53
2.	"Polite"	Phillips; Greg Wells	4:25
3.	"I Own You"	Phillips; Dave Bassett; Sheppard Solomon	2:47
4.	"I Am a Mountain"	Phillips; Wells	4:00
5.	"Little Dipper"	Phillips; Wells	3:32
6.	"Stranded"	Phillips; Shane Fontayne	3:01
7.	"I Never Shot the President"	Phillips; Bassett	3:11
8.	"So Tired"	Phillips; Bill Deasy; Howard Jones	4:38
9.	"Mermaid and the Earthman"	Phillips; Jill Cunniff	6:04
10.	"Just Look Around"	Phillips; Bazilian	4:18
11.	"When I Hated Him (Don't Tell Me)"	Phillips; Nathan December	5:58
12.	"Breakfast"	Phillips	3:56
Total length:			50:43

== Personnel ==
- Bijou Phillips – vocals, guitar

=== Additional musicians ===
- Jerry Harrison – guitar
- Eric Bazilian – guitar
- Joe Gore – guitar
- Michael Lockwood – guitar
- Dave Bassell – guitar
- Aishlia Harrison – background vocals
- Mackenzie Phillips – background vocals
- Frank Howard Swart – bass guitar
- Bernie Worrell – keyboards
- Patrick Warren – keyboards
- Prairie Prince – drums
- Stephanie Spruill – tambourine
- Philip Steir – loops
- Doug McKean – loops

=== Production ===
- Jerry Harrison – producer
- Doug McKean – engineer
- Mauricio Iragorri – assistant engineer
- Josh Richardson – assistant engineer
- Kent Matcke – assistant engineer
- Tom Lord-Alge – mixing
- Bob Ludwig – mastering
- Bob Bortnick – direction
- Robin Sloane – creative director
- Christy Bush – photography
- P. E. Raske – illustrations
