= The Bridge to Nowhere =

- Directed by: Blair Underwood
- Written by: Christopher Guiterrez
- Starring: Ben Crowley; Danny Masterson; Bijou Phillips; Daniel London; Ving Rhames
- Cinematography: Keith Gruchala
- Edited by: Chuck Aikman
- Release date: 2009
- Country: United States

The Bridge to Nowhere is an independent 2009 crime drama written by Christopher Gutierrez, directed by Blair Underwood in his directorial debut.

== Plot ==
Kevin, Brian, Chris, Darick and Eddie are childhood friends from a working-class neighborhood in Pittsburgh. They are in their mid-20s and working low paid blue collar jobs and occasional small criminal offenses like selling marijuana or illegally providing liquor for parties.

Brian convinces all but Eddie to start making money by pandering. They start with two girls, Jasper and Sienna, and the business eventually expands to five girls. They find a drug dealer, Nate, to supply cocaine, first for the girls, and then for their 'johns' as well. As the business succeeds, Nate's price gets more expensive. As their fortunes grow and the affluent lifestyle affects Brian, he eventually gets addicted to the drug, even though Nate had warned them all not to "partake in the product".

One night Chris takes Sienna to meet with an old client who likes Sienna. Both smoke crack, and the 'john' kills her. The police arrive and arrest him and Chris, who is outside the room, unaware of the murder. He is charged with several crimes that include prostitution, drug-dealing, possession etc., and could face many years in state prison. Brian visits Chris in jail, who tells Brian the cops will likely reduce his sentence to two years minimum, if he tells them where he got the drugs from. Brian tries to convince Chris that if he does this, Nate will hunt him down, but Chris doesn't care.

Brian returns to the other two to talk with them, but the others tell him that they are not going to be involved in the business anymore with Chris in jail and Sienna dead, so they quit, after Kevin also discloses to Brian that he loves Jasper. Brian then tells Nate about what happened, and Nate contracts to kill Chris in jail, but the old convict he hires, who sticks a shiv into Chris several times, does not kill him. Chris tells the police of Brian's drug & pimping business.

Darick is killed by Nate and Brian tries to kill Kevin unsuccessfully. Kevin takes a plane out of the country, with Jasper catching up with him later, her having been shot by Brian in the attempt to kill the couple. She goes to the hospital and catches the next flight out. The police raid Brian's luxury penthouse condo. Brian burns all of his drug money and tries to flush the drugs down the toilet, but the cops turn off the water supply, knowing Brian is planning on getting rid of the drugs. A police helicopter hovers over his patio-pool-deck and they order Brian to surrender. Brian grabs his AR-15 and fires at the helicopter, which flies off, and then he exchanges gunfire with the many cops around the building. Out of bullets, Brian runs to his bedroom to gets his pistols. He calls his mother and apologizes for the lifestyle he chose. She sees what is happening on the TV news live. Brian walks back outside, with guns in both hands. Cops order him to drop the weapons or they will shoot. Brian contemplates the situation and surrenders, and as he lays down the pistols, Nate, from a distance and armed with a sniper rifle, shoots and kills him so he can't tell the cops who supplied him the drugs. The police, amazed, don't see who kills him, thinking the shot was from one of their own snipers, and presumably Nate gets away (but likely just temporarily, as Nate thinks Chris is dead).

At Darick and Brian's funeral, Brian's mother is shown in the cemetery with Eddie and Chris, who is still incarcerated and using a wheelchair. Finally, in Eddie's thoughts, he discloses Kevin and Jasper are somewhere away from the US., and that the 'organization' made over $7 million in about a year of operation, but that it was 'all gone'. In closing, he emotes he didn't want to be involved from the beginning because, though his friends 'flew high for a while, in the end they flew off the bridge to nowhere'.

== Cast ==
- Ving Rhames as Nate, local criminal and drug kingpin.
- Ben Crowley as Brian
- Daniel London as Chris
- Danny Masterson as Kevin
- Thomas Ian Nicholas as Eddie Stanton
- Bijou Phillips as Jasper
- Alexandra Breckenridge as Sienna
- Alanna Romansky as Kimberly
- Jason Michael Lloyd as Pittsburgh Police
- Blair Underwood as The Director

== Crew ==
- Blair Underwood - Director
- Christopher Guiterrez - Writer
- Blondel Aidoo - producer
- Benny Barton - executive producer
- Mike Dolan - executive producer
- Brian Hartman - producer
- John O. Hartman - co-producer
- Alexandra Mehlman - associate producer
- Gary Mehlman - executive producer
- Tommy Morgan Jr. - producer
- Mike Wittlin - producer
- Keith Gruchala - Cinematographer
- Chuck Aikman - Editor
- Monica Swann - Casting Director
- Lendie Lee - Production Designer
- Rebecca Brown - Set Decorators
- Diane Collins - Costume Designers

Make Up Department

- Patty Bell - key makeup artist
- Susie Popovich - assistant makeup artist
- Rachael Ryan - additional makeup artist

Second Unit Directors or Assistant Directors

- John O. Hartman - second unit director
- David 'Yoko' Jose - second assistant director
- Steve Parys - first assistant director

== Music ==
- Music Score By Scott Glasgow
- Songs By ..........

== Reception ==
Jason Buchanan calls it a "gritty urban drama exploring the dark side of the criminal lifestyle" in a short review in The New York Times.
