= List of Raising Hope characters =

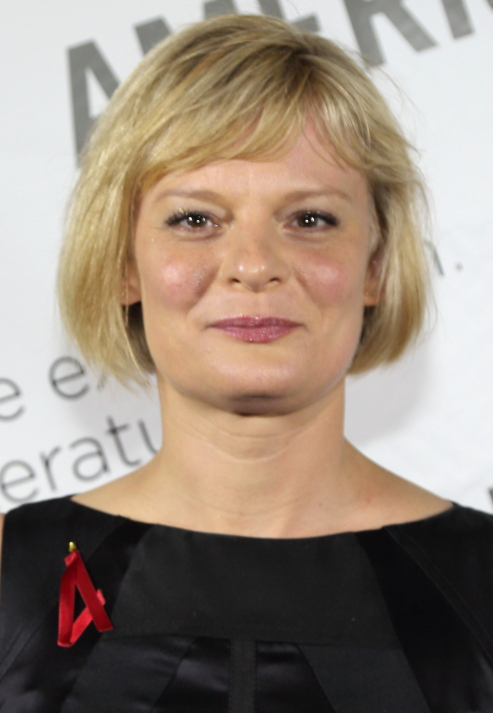
Martha Plimpton, who plays Virginia Chance, at the PEN Gala

This is a list of fictional characters in the television series Raising Hope. The article deals with the series' main, recurring and guest stars.

== Main cast ==
=== Jimmy Chance ===
James Bon Jovi Chance, commonly known as Jimmy, played by Lucas Neff, Hope's father. A good-natured, wide-eyed 23-year-old who is clueless about raising a child and everything else. He met and had a one-night stand with Lucy Carlyle, resulting in her pregnancy and the birth of Hope. He did not know Carlyle was a serial killer until the next morning and had no idea she was pregnant with Hope until seven months later when Lucy contacted him. He works for his father's landscaping and pool cleaning business, and later gets a second job as a bagger at Howdy's, an Old West themed grocery store, where he meets his future wife, Sabrina Collins. Jimmy is harmless and kindhearted, but dimwitted, which is implied to be a result of his parents' inept care. He is a talented artist and in Season 2 Episode 1, it was revealed that he used to have musical talent when he was young (Teen singer Greyson Chance played 13-year old Jimmy in the episodes "Prodigy" and "Inside Probe") . When he was a teenager, he went through a phase where he dressed like a goth, and it is revealed that Sabrina was attracted to his "Drakar Noire" personality. In Season 3, he marries Sabrina and moves in with her. Five-year old Jimmy is played by Trace Garcia, Greg Garcia's son.

=== Virginia Chance ===
Virginia Slims Chance (née Thompson) played by Martha Plimpton. Hope's paternal grandmother, Jimmy's mother, and Burt's wife. She is sarcastic and frequently utters malaprops. When she was younger, she had a scoliosis and had to wear a back brace, but she claims that having sex with Burt cured her of it. Virginia conceived Jimmy when she was fifteen (he was born on prom night). Her mother wanted to be a swinger and left her when she was two years old, leaving her to be raised by her grandmother, Maw Maw, who told Virginia that her mother had died when she'd fallen and hit her head on a lawn ornament in the form of a duck. In the pilot, she is shown chainsmoking, but she quits in the second episode and gives Jimmy her cigarette money to pay for Hope's daycare. Virginia works as a housecleaner in upper middle/upper-class houses. For her performance as Virginia in the first season, Martha Plimpton was nominated for the Primetime Emmy Award for Outstanding Lead Actress in a Comedy Series. Teenage Virginia is played by Kelly Heyer.

=== Burt Chance ===
Engelburt Jebbidiah "Burt" Chance played by Garret Dillahunt. Hope's paternal grandfather, Jimmy's father, and Virginia's husband. Burt conceived Jimmy with Virginia when he was seventeen. He is dimwitted, with flights of fancy and delusions of grandeur, but very kindhearted. He is a recovered gambling-addict and he runs a lawn care/pool cleaning business with Jimmy as his assistant, working shirtless to get more tips from the bored middle-aged housewives watching. As a teenager, he wanted to be a rockstar, and he is often shown playing his guitar, performing several songs throughout the series and fulfilling a lifelong dream by playing alongside washed up rock star Smokey Floyd in the episode "Burt Rocks", later bashing Floyd over the head for verbally abusing his granddaughter (becoming a minor celebrity in the process).

=== Hope Chance ===
Played by identical twins Baylie and Rylie Cregut, Hope Chance (born Princess Beyonce Carlyle), Jimmy and Lucy's daughter, Virginia and Burt's granddaughter and Maw Maw's great-great-granddaughter. Hope was conceived in Jimmy's van when he went out to get bubblegum ice cream and met a distressed Lucy Carlyle with whom he had a one-night stand. Hope is shown to be very intelligent, which she likely gets from her mother, as she was able to figure out a shape-sorter toy when she was two (Jimmy wasn't able to do it even when he was four) and pass a GED test by randomly filling in the dots. At one point, she scared her family by showing violent tendencies that made them think she was going to become a serial killer like her biological mother; but they realized that Lucy was a serial killer because she suppressed her anger and let it out drastically by killing. They subsequently decide that if they let Hope release her anger normally, she'd be just fine.

=== Sabrina Collins ===
Sabrina Marie Chance (née Collins) played by Shannon Woodward, Jimmy's co-worker at Howdy's despite coming from a rich family. She spends most of her time drawing on cantaloupes and mixing up the cereals and soup cans. In Season 1, Sabrina immediately catches Jimmy's attention, but she has a boyfriend, Wyatt, who is studying Finance in New York. In the season two episode, Jimmy's Fake Girlfriend, she breaks up with Wyatt after realizing how selfish he is, and starts dating Jimmy. In season three, she marries Jimmy and they move into her grandmother's old house. In Squeak means Squeak, she reveals that she is worried about her ability to be a parent to Hope, but after Hope calls her "mommy", she becomes more confident in herself. After acting as her mother for close to a year, Sabrina legally adopts Hope in the season four episode, Adoption. She is extremely nearsighted but usually wears contact lenses.

=== Maw Maw ===
Barbara June "Maw Maw" Thompson played by Cloris Leachman. Virginia's 84-year-old grandmother, Jimmy's great-grandmother, and Hope's great-great-grandmother, who owns the American Craftsman house at 3300 Bradley Avenue where the Chances all live. Maw Maw appears to have dementia and has only short-lived moments of lucidity in which she can be very helpful or very angry about the entire family living in her house. Her moments of lucidity are random, and each member of the household has revolving "dibs" on a task they would like her to accomplish during these times. A "Special Guest Star" in Season 1, in subsequent seasons her billing read, "And Introducing Cloris Leachman as Maw Maw," joking about Leachman's decades-long career in comedy. Leachman also played the character of Norma June, Maw Maw's long-estranged, presumed deceased (even Norma June believes she is dead) 104-year-old mother, in the Season 3 finale, "Mother's Day", in which both women argue, then reconcile, after which Norma June passes away peacefully in the bathroom. For the first season, Leachman was nominated for the Primetime Emmy Award for Outstanding Guest Actress in a Comedy Series.

=== Barney Hughes ===
Barney Hughes (Gregg Binkley) is the manager of Howdy's, the store where Jimmy and Sabrina work. He used to be grossly overweight but he had gastric bypass surgery. He is divorced and his distress over it resurfaces in several episodes. He was raised by a lesbian couple, their unorthodox parenting style also contributing to his quirky personality. He likes to collect dolls and pig figurines, among other eccentricities. He had a brief relationship with Sabrina's Aunt Maxine. Like Burt, he is a recovered gambling addict, with the former convincing him to give in to his old vice. He was a recurring character for the first season and got promoted to main cast for the rest of the series.

== Recurring cast ==
=== Shelley Collins ===
Shelley Collins (Kate Micucci) is Sabrina's cousin. Shelley had previously made out with Jimmy during a party. Two years later, Shelley reappears after Jimmy needs a babysitter. Shelley is positive that Jimmy loves her and they start a relationship, which is ended by Jimmy when he reveals his feelings for Sabrina to her. She used to have a "dead tooth" (a brown and decaying front tooth) she kept as a conversation starter, but had it fixed out of fear of being made fun of. Shelley runs a daycare center for children, dogs, and senior citizens, for whom she frequently plays the ukulele and composes songs. In the episode "Mongooses," she is seen repeatedly turning her light switch on and off forty-five times, believing she must do so "to stay alive". As Hope's babysitter, they grow a strong bond. In season 2 episode 20, Shelley is the first name Hope says, to Sabrina's annoyance. In season 4, Frank professed his love for her and the two started a relationship.

Appeared in: 26 episodes

=== Frank Marolla ===
Frank (Todd Giebenhain) is a creepy and incompetent co-worker at the store where Jimmy and Sabrina work. However, in the Season 1 finale, it was shown that he used to be a skilled bagger before accidentally hitting Shelley in the face with a can of fruit. It was revealed in season 2's The Men of New Natesville, that he shared the same bully as Jimmy in high school, and the two of them bond over the fact. Since then, he has largely replaced Javier and Marcus as Jimmy's best male friend. In season 3, he and Jimmy were married, but later got an annulment in the episode “What Happens at Howdy's Doesn't Stay at Howdy's”. He has a close relationship with Maw Maw in season 4, and was briefly her lover. Later in season 4, he professed his love for Shelley and the two started a relationship.

Appeared in: 50 episodes

=== Andrew ===
Andrew (Ethan Suplee) is a timid neighbor who clings to Burt as his only friend once his wife is gone.

Appeared in: 5 episodes

=== Javier and Marcus ===
Javier and Marcus (Ray Santiago and Jermaine Williams) are Jimmy's best friends. They keep trying to get Jimmy to do dangerous and outrageous things. The pair are effectively replaced by Frank after Season 2.

Both appeared in: 5 episodes

=== Mike Chance ===
Mike Chance (Skyler Stone) is Jimmy's cousin and Hope's first cousin once removed. He worked for Burt's gardening business before leaving with a girl to join a cult. In "The Cultish Personality", Mike returns with his wife Tanya (Mary Lynn Rajskub) and "brother-husbands" Jeff (Paul F. Tompkins), Rodney (Chris Frontiero) and Chester (Kent Avenido). It is revealed that his father (Burt's brother) Bruce (J.K. Simmons) had kicked him out of the house, and Burt had taken him in. After being falsely accused by Burt of kidnapping Hope (Burt's attempt to get Mike out of the cult and back with his father), Mike reunites with his father and joins the family mattress business. In the pilot, Stone was credited as a main character, but by the second episode, he was written out.

Appeared in: 4 episodes

=== Sylvia and Donovan ===
Sylvia and Donovan (Tichina Arnold and Phill Lewis) are rich friends of Burt and Virginia's. They first met the Chance family when Jimmy attempted to make friends with their son, although they had already known Virginia through her cleaning their house.

Sylvia appeared in: 3 episodes

Donovan appeared in: 2 episodes

=== Wyatt Gill ===
Wyatt (Ryan Doom) is Sabrina's ex-boyfriend, who is away at college. He isn't liked by Jimmy and his family. Sabrina and Wyatt break up when Jimmy and his (fake) girlfriend take them on a double date, which reveals Wyatt's selfishness to Sabrina.

Appeared in: 8 episodes

=== Lucy Carlyle ===
Lucy Carlyle (Bijou Phillips) is Hope's biological mother. She is a serial killer who has killed several of her boyfriends after inadvertent influence provided by Shelley (who merely said she should "get rid of" her boyfriend, but Lucy took the advice out of context and thought she meant kill him). She met Jimmy after trying to escape her latest murder attempt. She then seduces him and becomes pregnant with Hope. Soon afterward, the Chances learn who Lucy really is and turn her in to the police. Eight months later, Lucy contacts Jimmy and reveals that she is pregnant with Jimmy's baby. After delivering a daughter she originally names "Princess Beyoncé", Lucy is sentenced to death by electric chair. In one of the later episodes, Jimmy, Burt, and Virginia receive the memoir Lucy left Hope, which includes a video about how to survive in prison and "how to attract a man". In the first part of the season 2 finale, it is revealed that Jimmy married Lucy in prison, and that Lucy is not dead after all. In the second part, Lucy arrives at the Chance family's house and says that if Jimmy and Hope don't move to Tibet with her she will fight for sole custody of their daughter. Lucy's lawyer wins the case and Lucy gets Hope. Sabrina understands that, although Jimmy loves her, he loves his child and it would be wrong to keep him from Hope, and so tearfully agrees that he should go with Lucy. On the way to the airport they pass Sabrina and Jimmy stares out of the car window at her, leading Lucy to stop the car and ask him if he really does love Sabrina, to which he replies yes. Lucy then gets out of the car and chases after Sabrina with a knife; but before she can kill her, she is run over by a blind Carl driving Smokey Floyd's tour bus. Jimmy then gets Hope back and the Chances go back to their ordinary lives. She did not appear again until season three when the death certificate was needed to make Jimmy and Sabrina's wedding certificate official. So when Virginia and Burt go to get it from her dad, she is revealed to still be alive and attacks them and is shocked by an electric collar.

In Greg Garcia's original pilot script of the series, Lucy is not killed by the electric chair due to loose wires. After the failed execution, she argues with the warden that a second attempt to kill her would be considered barbaric, comparing it to the case of Willie Francis. She mentions that the case eventually went to the Supreme Court, and while they ruled against him five votes to four, she states that that was before female judges, lamenting that "No way Ginsburg and Sotomayor let me fry twice". Believing that God "saved" her "for a reason", she also demands Jimmy to return Hope to her. However, Jimmy ultimately decides against it. It is implied at the end of the script that the character was to become a recurring antagonist, as the headline of a newspaper reads "Execution botched. Lawyers vow to get client released". Elements of the original script were reused when Lucy was revealed to be alive in the season 2 finale.

Appeared in: 7 episodes

=== Rosa Flores ===
Rosa (Carla Jimenez) is Virginia's Mexican boss. Virginia and Burt temporarily moved into Rosa's house after Maw Maw kicked them out. She has three children. She later recommended that her company give Virginia a promotion.

Appeared in: 12 episodes

=== Jack ===
Jack (Sean Bridgers) is a ponytailed hippie who "kidnapped" Burt twenty years ago.

Appeared in: 2 episodes

=== Wally Phipps ===
Wally Phipps (Lou Wagner) is an incompetent attorney who "helps" the Chances with occasional legal matters.

Appeared in: 8 episodes

=== Reverend Bob ===
Reverend Bob (Leslie Jordan) couple-counselled Jimmy and Sabrina and later performed their wedding. He married a foreign woman, not for love, but to help her get U.S. citizenship. He has shown to have some homosexual feelings.

Appeared in: 2 episodes

=== Jimmy and Christine Hughes ===
Jimmy Hughes (Mike O'Malley) and his wife Christine (Liza Snyder) found Virginia and Burt's sex tape years earlier and had watched it many times. Jimmy later was secretly living in a bunker under the Chance residence. They reprise these characters from the sitcom Yes, Dear (also created by Greg Garcia).

O'Malley appeared in: 2 episodes Snyder appeared in: 1 episode and as a flashback in a second

== Guest stars ==
Throughout the series, many of the regular or recurring cast members of My Name Is Earl (also created by Greg Garcia) have appeared in supporting parts from minor to main:

- Jason Lee as Smokey Floyd, a washed-up rock star for whom Burt once tried to audition until Smokey told him to take baby Jimmy and go.
- Eddie Steeples as Tyler, the Gas Man / arcade manager / pizza man. His character provided a running gag where Burt would encounter him and greet him with "Hey Gas Man" (or "Pizza Man." etc.) To which he would respond, "Hey Burt." Mirroring the regular "Hey Crab Man" / "Hey Earl" exchanges on My Name Is Earl.
- Jaime Pressly as Donna, Andrew's wife who leaves him but later gets back together with him.
- Nadine Velazquez as Valentina, a trampoline artist who performs in Smokey Floyd's new band.
- Dale Dickey, portraying Patty, the daytime hooker, the same character from My Name Is Earl.

Other guest stars include:

- Greg Germann as Dale Carlyle, Lucy's father and Hope's maternal grandfather, a psychiatrist treating his wife.
- Valerie Mahaffey as Margine Carlyle, Lucy's mother and Hope's maternal grandmother. She is being treated by her husband (who was previously her therapist) for depression. She and her husband try to kidnap Hope twice and wind up in prison.
- Brandon T. Jackson as Justin, a fellow young father who Jimmy tries to befriend.
- Amy Sedaris as Delilah, Virginia's cousin, MawMaw's granddaughter, Jimmy's first cousin once removed and Hope's first cousin twice removed.
  - Laura Avey as teenage Delilah
- JK Simmons as Bruce, Burt's brother, Mike's father, Jimmy's uncle and Hope's great-uncle.
- Mary Lynn Rajskub as Tanya, Mike's polyandrist wife.
- Ashley Tisdale as Mary-Louise, Jimmy's fake girlfriend.
- Katy Perry as Rikki Hargrove, Sabrina's childhood friend who became a women's prison guard. After being arrested because of protest Sabrina meets Rikki who recognices her but Sabrina doesn't remember Rikki.
- Paul F. Tompkins as Jeff, one of Mike's "brother-husbands."
- Stephen Root as Cap Collins, Sabrina's father.
- Greyson Chance as Young Jimmy, with musical talent
- Lee Majors and Shirley Jones as Burt's parents, Jimmy's paternal grandparents, and Hope's great-grandparents.
- Melanie Griffith as Tamara, Sabrina's mother.
- Tippi Hedren as Nana, Tamara's mother - as well as in true life mother of Melanie Griffith - and Sabrina's Grandmother.
- David Krumholtz as Carl, a blind man for whom the Chance family offered to babysit his seeing eye pig. After Maw Maw killed the pig, they bought a pig at a petting zoo, and accidentally trained it to help Carl.
- Molly Shannon as Maxine
- Mike O'Malley as Jimmy Hughes
- Liza Snyder as Christine Hughes
- Whit Hertford as Officer Ross, Natesville's resident law enforcer and keeper of the peace. He has been attracted to Virginia since 6th grade.
- Hilary Duff as Rachel, Jimmy's former girlfriend.
- Jeffrey Tambor as Arnold, Virginia's long-lost father, Jimmy's grandfather and Hope's great-grandfather.
- Mary Birdsong as Mayor Suzie Hellmann
- Mary Gross as Denise Jenkins
- Brian Doyle Murray as Walt
- Richard Dean Anderson as Keith
- Laura Ashley Samuels as Abigail
- Anthony Anderson as a neighbour
- Kenny Loggins as himself, singing Danny's Song in the last episode
