= Jordan Masterson =

American actor (born 1986)

- Born: April 9, 1986 (age 40); Dunedin, Florida, U.S.
- Occupation: Actor
- Years active: 1993; 2000–present
- Known for: Last Man Standing
- Father: Joe Reaiche
- Relatives: Alanna Masterson; (sister); Danny Masterson; (half-brother); Christopher Masterson; (half-brother)

Jordan Masterson (born April 9, 1986) is an American actor. He played Zeb, a five-year-old boy, in Danielle Steel's 1993 TV adaptation Star. He is known for his role as Mark in the 2005 film The 40-Year-Old Virgin and his recurring role as Dumptruck in ABC Family comedy-drama series Greek. He co-starred as Ryan Vogelson in the sitcom Last Man Standing on ABC (2012–2017) and later Fox (2018–2021), replacing Nick Jonas.

He also guest starred in the television series Grounded for Life, George Lopez, Las Vegas, 7th Heaven, CSI: Miami, Without a Trace and How I Met Your Mother.

Masterson is the brother of actress Alanna Masterson and the maternal half-brother of actors Danny Masterson and Christopher Masterson.

== Early life ==
Masterson was born on April 9, 1986, in Dunedin, Florida. His mother, Carol Masterson, is also his manager, and his father, Joe Reaiche, who was of Lebanese descent, was a professional rugby league player.

He is the younger half-brother of actors Danny Masterson and Christopher Masterson (he guest starred on both of his half-brothers' respective series, That '70s Show and Malcolm in the Middle). He is the older brother of actress Alanna Masterson.

As a child, Masterson was active in baseball, tennis, and snowboarding.

== Personal life ==
Along with his mother, sister, and half-brothers, Masterson is a member of the Church of Scientology. They were estranged from his father (Danny and Christopher’s stepfather) until his death in 2024, due to Scientology's practice of shunning critics.

He was previously in a long-term relationship with actress Dakota Johnson.

== Filmography ==
Film
Year	Title	Role	Notes
2005	Pancho's Pizza	Skater #1	Short film
2005	The 40-Year-Old Virgin	Mark	
2009	Poolside	Jerry	Short film
2009	Midnight Ride	Chet	Short film
2014	Bad Roomies	Fred	

Television
Year	Title	Role	Notes
1993	Marilyn & Bobby: Her Final Affair	Joseph	TV film
1993	Star	Zeb	TV film
2000	That '70s Show	Paperboy	Episode: "Too Old to Trick or Treat, Too Young to Die"
2001–2002	Grounded for Life	Boy #3; Lily's Friend	Episodes: "Mrs. Finnerty, You've Got a Lovely Daughter" & "We Are Family"
2002	Do Over	Chris Landy	Episode: "Halloween Kiss"
2002	Malcolm in the Middle	Student #2	Episode: "Humilithon"
2002–2003	George Lopez	Adam Conners	Episodes: "Love Bites" & "Girl Fight"
2002	Las Vegas	Teenager	Episode: "The Big Bang"
2005	Listen Up	Patrick	Episode: "Coach Potato"
2005	Are You Game?	Himself as Host	Unsold TV game show pilot
2006	7th Heaven	Eli	Episode: "The Magic of Gershwin"
2006	CSI: Miami	Wayne Leonard	Episode: "Free Fall"
2007	Without a Trace	Jay Pastorfield	Episode: "Clean Up"
2009	How I Met Your Mother	Colin	Episode: "Three Days of Snow"
2010–2011	Greek	Dumptruck	Recurring role
2011	Memphis Beat	Pete Harrison	Episode: "The Feud"
2012	The Beauty Inside	Alex #14	TV miniseries short
2012–2021	Last Man Standing	Ryan Vogelson	Recurring role (seasons 2–3); Regular role (season 4–9); Director: "Parent-normal Activity"
