= Wake (2009 film) =

- Directed by: Ellie Kanner
- Written by: Lennox Wiseley
- Produced by: Hal Schwartz; Bill Shraga; Lennox Wiseley
- Starring: Bijou Phillips; Ian Somerhalder; Danny Masterson; Marguerite Moreau; Jane Seymour; Sprague Grayden; David Zayas
- Music by: Brad Segal
- Release date: February 25, 2009 (US)
- Running time: 97 minutes
- Country: United States
- Language: English

Wake is a 2009 comedy drama romance independent film directed by Ellie Kanner and starring Bijou Phillips, Ian Somerhalder, Jane Seymour, Danny Masterson, and Marguerite Moreau.

Carys Reitman, unable to cry for years, frequents funerals, finally feels moved by Tyler, who is grieving his fiancée. Through a series of misunderstandings, she tries to open herself to the risks of love with Tyler, realizing she may have more to fear than just a broken heart.

== Plot ==
Carys Reitman, yearning to be able to cry, often hangs out with her undertaker best friend Shane at a funeral home and attends strangers' funerals. Anna's funeral, a woman her own age, she finally is moved to tears by her fiancé Tyler.

Just as Carys is trying to put back on Anna's engagement ring which slipped off while she was viewing the body, the mourning Tyler approaches. Saying she is an old friend, she then bursts into sobs and into his arms to hide her face and avoid Anna's parents' questions.

Outside, Tyler talks Carys into driving them to the cemetery. There, Anna's mom insists on seeing her again before lowering the casket, so Tyler sees the engagement ring is missing. Carys drives him to the funeral home but stays in the car. A man approaches, but leaves when Tyler returns.

Tyler invites Carys for drinks. Trying to get to know her, he again cannot fathom never hearing anything about her before, so calls it a night. At home, Carys interacts negatively with her housemate Lila as usual before putting away the engagement ring.

The next day, Carys visits the funeral home to tell Shane about accidentally taking the ring. Livid, he insists she come clean to the family and return it. At home, Tyler gives Carys a surprise visit. She starts to tell all, when he asks her to refrain if it is negative. Then, Tyler asks Carys to be his buffer at a dinner with Anna's family.

Carys skillfully manoeuvers around Anna's parents when they try to ask about her connection with Anna. Anna's sister Marisa persists in asking, so she excuses herself to the bathroom. Anna's parents corner Tyler, trying to get him to resign as her executor, as they have financial difficulties.

Tyler asserts her wishes were clear, then he and Carys leave. As they had not eaten, They then go out for dinner, where Tyler explains that Anna was ambivalent about money, but passionate about child cancer research.

Tyler walks Carys to her door, commenting she is Anna's polar opposite. They kiss, but immediately afterwards he vomits in the bushes, disgusted with himself for kissing someone else days after his fiancés's death.

As she is starting to feel again, Carys tries to speak to her parents, as they have been estranged for years. However both of them steer clear of whatever Carys tries to discuss. Returning home to messages from Tyler, they meet up. He tries to explain himself, but they soon throw themselves at each other.

As Carys is developing a connection with Tyler, Shane insists she come clean before he professes feelings for her. She finds his veterinary clinic on Google, paying him a surprise visit, just as he had once done with her. After they watch the play Carys designed the sets for, a hysterical Marisa calls Tyler, accusing him of killing Anna.

After going dancing in a typical Texan bar, where Carys again spots the man who has been watching them, the police show up and interrupt their lovemaking. Wanting to question her, as they suspect Tyler of foul play, she is encouraged to contact them.

Marisa shows up at Carys', seeking answers. When pressed, Carys is relieved to admit she had never met Anna. Marisa then suggests Tyler and she had been having an affair, as Anna had been acting increasingly strangely and afraid. She assumes she feared someone was going to murder her.

Between the police, Marisa and Shane suspecting Tyler of murder, after Carys sees him arguing with the detectives, she follows him. She watches him put a medication in a locked refrigerator, then avoids him for a few days. However they meet, clear up the misunderstanding then head to Santa Barbara for a few days.

Shane warns Carys that Anna's body is being exhumed for suspicion of murder. Acting very strangely around Tyler, she is even moreso after receiving confirmation that Anna died of pet euthanasia meds. Just as he is getting on one knee, Carys has a blunt instrument to defend herself against being murdered, as she reveals her lies.

The police raid the house, taking both of them in, tipped off by Shane. Tyler refuses to talk to Carys as Marisa shows up to bail him out. She has opened up Anna's safe deposit box, which details her advanced cancer. As their parents are deeply religious, Anna did not want them to know she chose euthanasia.

Tyler pays Carys' bail, although asks them to delay her release until he has gone. Carys' mom comes to see her, finally ending their estrangement by talking about Carys' long-dead sister.

Months pass, then Tyler sends Carys an olive branch in the form of a remembrance meet up for Anna at her gravestone.

== Cast ==
- Bijou Phillips as Carys Reitman
- Ian Somerhalder as Tyler
- Danny Masterson as Shane
- Marguerite Moreau as Lila
- Jane Seymour as Mrs. Reitman
- Sprague Grayden as Marissa
- Kevin Alejandro as Detective Daniels
- David Zayas as Detective Grayson
- Charlie Adler as Priest
- Meredith Monroe as Phaedra

== Release ==
The film was the Opening Night film at the 2009 Cinequest Film Festival. It later was a Spotlight Presentation at the Newport Beach Film Festival. The film was released by E1 Entertainment on DVD and digital platforms on April 20, 2010. It has played on both Showtime and Starz in the US. It was released internationally by Moving Pictures.
