= Havoc (2005 film) =

2005 film by Barbara Kopple

- Theatrical release poster
- Directed by: Barbara Kopple
- Screenplay by: Stephen Gaghan
- Story by: Stephen Gaghan; Jessica Kaplan
- Produced by: Jack F. Murphy; John Morrissey; Stewart Hall
- Starring: Anne Hathaway; Bijou Phillips; Mike Vogel
- Cinematography: Kramer Morgenthau
- Edited by: Nancy Baker; Jerry Greenberg
- Music by: Cliff Martinez
- Production company: Media 8 Entertainment
- Distributed by: New Line Home Entertainment
- Release dates: June 26, 2005 (Filmfest München); November 29, 2005 (United States)
- Running time: 85 minutes
- Countries: United States; Germany
- Languages: English; Spanish
- Budget: $9 million
- Box office: $371,000

Havoc is a 2005 crime drama film directed by Barbara Kopple from a screenplay by Stephen Gaghan, who wrote the story with Jessica Kaplan. The film stars Anne Hathaway, Bijou Phillips, and Mike Vogel. It follows the lives of wealthy Los Angeles teenagers whose exposure to hip hop culture inspires them to imitate the gangster lifestyle and engage in slum tourism; they run into trouble when they encounter a gang of drug dealers, discovering they are not as street-wise as they had thought. Shiri Appleby, Freddy Rodriguez, Joseph Gordon-Levitt, Channing Tatum, Michael Biehn, and Laura San Giacomo appear in supporting roles. It is an international co-production between the United States and Germany.

Havoc made its world premiere at the Filmfest München on June 26, 2005, and was shown at several film festivals. It was released directly on DVD in the United States on November 29, 2005.

== Plot ==
Teenage filmmaker Eric attempts to document the lifestyle of Allison Lang and her boyfriend Toby's gang of white upper-class teenagers living in the Pacific Palisades neighborhood of Los Angeles. Later that night, Toby's gang goes to a party at Eric's house and Allison performs oral sex on him in his car, from which he derives so much sexual pleasure that he ejaculates in only fifteen seconds.

The next day, Allison meets with her father at work to discuss family problems, revealing the virtually nonexistent relationship she has with her parents. Afterward, she and her friends drive downtown into East Los Angeles and buy marijuana from a Mexican drug dealer, Hector, and his crew. Toby believes that Hector did not sell him enough for what he paid, and attempts to confront him; Hector pulls a gun on him, humiliating him in front of his friends but lets him go when Allison pleads.

Tomorrow night, Allison and her girlfriends return to the location where Hector and his crew regularly gather and attend a party with them. Hector informs Allison of a motel where his crew regularly party, and invites her to stop by.

Allison meets up with Hector another day, and he shows her around his neighborhood and talks about his lifestyle. His tour abruptly ends when the police arrive on a drug bust. Allison winds up being arrested with the other gang members present, but is let off the hook. The experience only serves to increase her fascination with the inner-city lifestyle. The night after her release, Allison and her best friend Emily head downtown to hang out with Hector's crew at the motel.

There, Allison and Emily ask Hector if they can join his crew. Hector informs them of their initiation; to join the gang, the two must roll a die; the number they roll corresponds to the number of gang members they must have sex with.

Allison rolls a one; Emily rolls a three. Hector and Allison pair off, but Allison has second thoughts, refuses, and is thrown out of the room when she tries to get Emily to leave with her. Emily eagerly engages in sex with Hector. Hector signals the other gang members to join. When two of the gang members have sex with her at once, Emily becomes panicked and starts crying. Allison runs into the room and Emily collapses and cries in her arms. The three men leave the room angrily.

The next day, Allison returns to the motel and confronts Hector, but he responds that he only did what she and Emily had asked him to do. He notes that there is nothing real about her, calling her a poser.

The same day Emily is shown at a police station accusing Hector and his crew of gang rape. Allison is brought in for questioning, but claims to know nothing about a rape. Hector is arrested, and members of his crew vow to seek out and silence Allison and Emily, but wind up getting lost in Bel-Air. Meanwhile, Toby and his gang are posing with guns in front of Eric and his video camera, making clear their intent to seek revenge on Hector's crew. Eric shows Allison the footage, and Allison calls Toby and makes an ill-fated attempt to convince him that there was no rape and what he is doing is foolish.

Allison informs Emily of what Toby plans to do and reveals to Emily's parents the things that happened at the motel. This initially upsets Emily to the point of nearly attempting suicide, but the two reconcile. Meanwhile, Toby and his gang arrive at Hector's motel and bust in violently, but only succeed in frightening a group of Latina women with a baby. Unable to shoot, Toby and his friends leave.

On their drive home, the gang passes the SUV of Hector's crew that had been looking for Allison and Emily. The two gangs exchange looks, and the screen fades to black. After a few seconds the sounds of tires squealing, people shouting and a gunshot are heard.

The film ends by showing Allison’s segment of Eric’s footage for a third time.

== Cast ==
- Anne Hathaway as Allison Lang
- Bijou Phillips as Emily
- Shiri Appleby as Amanda
- Michael Biehn as Stuart Lang
- Joseph Gordon-Levitt as Sam
- Matt O'Leary as Eric
- Freddy Rodriguez as Hector
- Laura San Giacomo as Joanna Lang
- Mike Vogel as Toby
- Raymond Cruz as Chino
- Alexis Dziena as Sasha
- Channing Tatum as Nick
- Sam Hennings as Mr. Rubin
- Cecilia Peck as Mrs. Rubin
- Josh Peck as Josh Rubin
- Robert Shapiro as himself
- J. D. Pardo as Todd Rosenberg
- Sam Bottoms as Lt. Maris
- Laura Breckenridge as runaway

== Production ==
Havoc had a production budget of $9 million.

=== Development and writing ===
The original treatment of the script was written in 1993 by Jessica Kaplan, who was 14 years old at the time, and was based on her own observations of her affluent white classmates in West Los Angeles. Her script was sold to New Line Cinema two years later for $150,000, with the script being developed at Single Cell Pictures, a production company headed by Michael Stipe. Originally titled The Powers That Be, the script was a drama about Beverly Hills high school students who try to get involved with the South Central Los Angeles gangster rap music scene, and a young male teacher who helps the main character deal with a tragedy as a result of said escapades. The script went unused for two years, eventually gaining traction with the studio after it received a re-write from Stephen Gaghan. In 1997, Variety reported that Peter Horton was attached to direct. The script was later retitled Havoc.

Tony Kaye was approached to direct the film. Kaye had problems with the script, and made a series of demands, which included him having full control of rewriting the script.

On June 6, 2003, shortly before filming began, Kaplan was killed in a plane crash in Los Angeles, along with four other people, including her uncle. A dedication to Kaplan is shown preceding the credits at the end of the film.

=== Casting ===
When the script was sold in 1995, actors such as Alicia Silverstone, Stephen Dorff, Ethan Hawke, and Christian Slater were considered for roles.

Mandy Moore was originally cast as Allison, but dropped out and was replaced by her Princess Diaries co-star Hathaway shortly before filming began. Moore reportedly left the project because she felt uncomfortable with the film's subject matter. Moore's Saved! co-star Jena Malone was originally set to play Emily, but left the project shortly after Moore's departure.

=== Filming ===
Principal photography took place around Southern California, including Los Angeles, Altadena, Brentwood, and Santa Monica, in the fall of 2003.

== Release ==
Havoc was given a theatrical release overseas but has not yet received any theatrical release in the United States.

== Reception ==
=== Box office ===
The overseas theatrical release of Havoc earned $371,000.

=== Critical reception ===
On the review aggregator website Rotten Tomatoes, the film holds an approval rating of 45% based on 11 reviews, with an average rating of 5.3/10.

Lisa Nesselson of Variety claimed that the film "too often feels like a gussied-up '50s-style treatise about the dangers of nice girls flirting with social rebels", and suggested that the film be retitled Slumming for Dummies. Maitland McDonagh of TV Guide stated that the picture was a minor effort that was even more disappointing after considering the highly regarded names who had worked on the film, most notably Academy Award-winners Kopple and Gaghan. Richard Roeper of the Chicago Sun-Times was among the few noted critics who praised the film, calling it "harrowing and authentic", and also claimed that it might have made his list of top 10 films for 2005 had it received a proper theatrical release in the United States.

Various critics praised Hathaway's performance in the film, with Christopher Null stating that her turn proved "without a doubt that she has been underutilized as an actress for far too long."

== See also ==
- Slum tourism
