= Made for Each Other (2009 film) =

- Directed by: Daryl Goldberg
- Written by: Eric Lord
- Produced by: Sam Hamadeh
- Starring: Christopher Masterson; Bijou Phillips; Danny Masterson; Lauren German; George Segal; Patrick Warburton
- Music by: Ryan Shore
- Distributed by: IFC Films
- Release dates: April 25, 2009 (Newport Beach Film Festival); December 2, 2009 (United States)
- Country: United States
- Language: English

Made for Each Other is a 2009 romantic comedy, which received a limited theatrical release in 2009 before a DVD release in 2010.

== Plot ==
Dan (Christopher Masterson) has a problem; he has been married to the beautiful Marcie (Bijou Phillips) for three months, but they still have not consummated their union. When Dan's sex-crazed boss Catherine (Lauren German) comes on to him during a marathon work session, he crumbles under temptation. Immediately regretting his actions but unable to simply admit his indiscretion, Dan schemes with his best pal Mike (Samm Levine) to get Marcie to wander astray, too. If Dan is not the only one who cheated, he and Mike surmise, then Marcie can not be mad at him for doing so. But hatching the plan is one thing, and finding a guy who is willing to go along with his plan is an altogether different challenge. Later, as the plan finally starts to come together, Dan discovers the truth about why Marcie has yet to sleep with him, and comes to realize that they may actually be the perfect couple after all.

== Cast ==
- Danny Masterson as Morris
- Patrick Warburton as Mack Mackenzie
- Christopher Masterson as Dan
- Bijou Phillips as Marcy
- Samm Levine as Mike
- George Segal as Mr. Jacobs
- Lauren German as Catherine
- Leslie Hendrix as Mrs. Jacobs
- Kelsey Fowler as Enola
- Kyle Howard as Ed
- Adrian Martinez as Harry
- Andrew van den Houten as Charlie

== Production ==
This is the first film in which both of the Masterson brothers have featured.

The film's original score was composed by Ryan Shore.
