= Alanna Masterson =

American actress (born 1988)

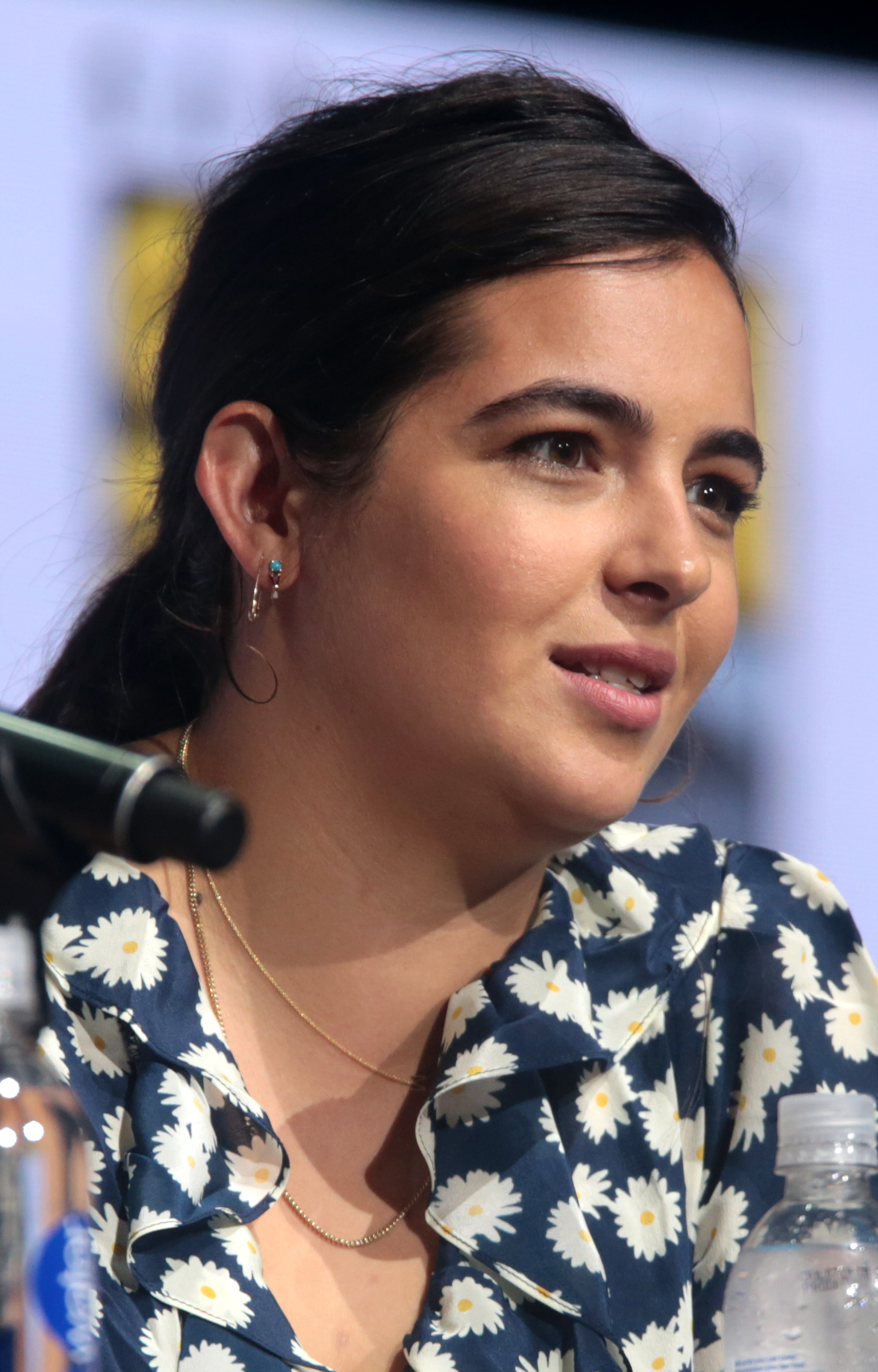
- Masterson at the 2017 San Diego Comic-Con
- Born: June 27, 1988 (age 38); New York City, U.S.
- Occupation: Actress
- Years active: 2001–present
- Spouse: Paul Longo (m. 2021)
- Children: 2
- Father: Joe Reaiche
- Relatives: Jordan Masterson (brother); Danny Masterson (half-brother); Christopher Masterson (half-brother)

Alanna Longo (née Masterson; born June 27, 1988) is an American actress, best known for her role as Tara Chambler in the AMC television series The Walking Dead.

== Early life ==
Masterson was born in New York City, to Carol Masterson and Joe Reaiche, a Lebanese-Australian former professional rugby league player with the Sydney Roosters and the South Sydney Rabbitohs. She is the younger sister to her brother, Jordan Masterson, and two half-brothers, Danny Masterson and Christopher Masterson. After some time on Long Island, the family later relocated to Los Angeles. She grew up around and was influenced by her older brothers who both starred in popular television shows in the late 1990s and early 2000s. Masterson's passion for acting came from spending a lot of time on set with her brothers and seeing the filming process.

== Career ==
Masterson has portrayed Tara Chambler on the AMC TV series The Walking Dead, beginning in the show's fourth season. Masterson was promoted to a series regular for the fifth season and was added to the main credits in the seventh season. Additionally, she had a recurring role in the fourth season of the ABC series Mistresses.

Masterson directed her first short film, Am I A Bad Person?, which will premiere at the 2026 Tribeca Film Festival at the Narrative Shorts Selection. The project will serve as her first under her married name.

== Personal life ==
On November 4, 2015, Masterson and then-boyfriend Brick Stowell had a daughter, Marlowe. In 2021, Masterson married restaurateur Paul Longo. On June 28, 2024, Masterson announced her pregnancy on Instagram. Their son, Vito Ford Longo, was born on September 13, 2024.

Masterson and her brothers are Scientologists and were estranged from her father (Danny and Christopher’s stepfather) up until his death in 2024, due to Scientology's practice of shunning critics.

== Filmography ==
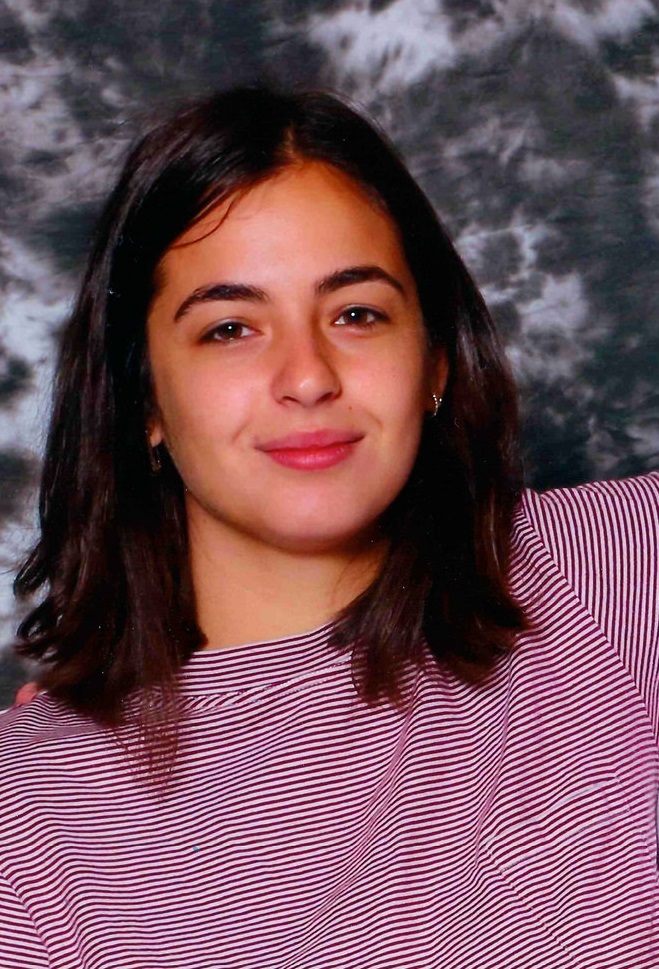
Alanna Masterson in 2014

Film
Year	Title	Role	Notes
2011	Peach Plum Pear	Dora Bell Hutchinson	
2018	Afraid	Alanna Meadows	
2026	Am I A Bad Person?		Short film; directorial debut; also screenwriter

Television
Year	Title	Role	Notes
1994–1995	The Young and the Restless	Colleen Carlton	2 episodes
2001	Definitely Maybe		Guest role
2006	Malcolm in the Middle	Heidi	Episode: "Malcolm's Money"
2008	Greek	Alanna	Guest role
2009	Terminator: The Sarah Connor Chronicles	Zoe McCarthy	Episode: "Desert Cantos"
2009	Grey's Anatomy	Hillary Boyd	Episode: "Invest in Love"
2010	First Day	Abby	Main role, 7 episodes
2012	Park It Up	Brenda	Guest role
2013–2019, 2022	The Walking Dead	Tara Chambler	61 episodes
2014	Men at Work	Mopey Hipster Girl	Episode: "Molly"
2014–2019	Talking Dead	Herself	Guest, 11 episodes
2016	@midnight	Herself	Guest
2016	Mistresses	Lydia	Recurring (Season 4)
2018	Younger	Kiara Johnson	Recurring (Season 5)
2022	Leverage: Redemption	Kira Simone	Guest role
