= Bijou Phillips =

American actress (born 1980)

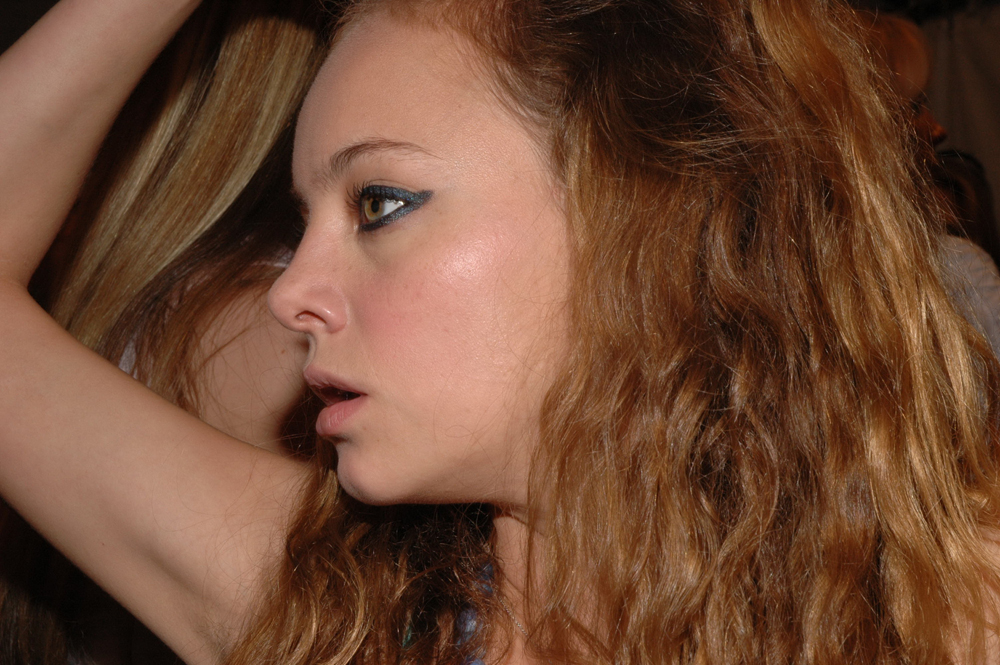
- Phillips in March 2005
- Born: Bijou Mary Phillips; April 1, 1980 (age 46); Greenwich, Connecticut, U.S.
- Occupations: Actress; model; socialite; singer
- Years active: 1994–present
- Spouse: Danny Masterson (m. 2011; sep. 2023)
- Children: 1
- Parents: John Phillips; Geneviève Waïte
- Relatives: Mackenzie Phillips (half-sister); Chynna Phillips (half-sister)

Bijou Mary Phillips (born April 1, 1980) is an American model, socialite, and former actress and singer. The daughter of musicians John Phillips and Geneviève Waïte, she began her career as a model. Phillips made her singing debut with I'd Rather Eat Glass (1999), and since her first major film appearance in Black and White (1999), she has acted in Almost Famous (2000), Bully (2001), The Door in the Floor (2004), Havoc (2005), Hostel: Part II (2007), and Choke (2008). From 2010 to 2013, she played the recurring role of Lucy Carlyle on the television series Raising Hope.

== Early life ==
Phillips was born on April 1, 1980, in Greenwich, Connecticut, and is the daughter of John Phillips of the Mamas and the Papas and his third wife, Geneviève Waïte, a South African model, artist, and actress. She was named for the song "My Petite Bijou" by Lambert, Hendricks & Ross (bijou means 'jewel' in French). She is the youngest of Phillips' children; she has one brother, Tamerlane, and three half-siblings (Mackenzie, Jeffrey, and Chynna). After her parents split up, both were found unfit to have custody of Bijou and she was placed in foster care with a family in Bolton Landing, New York. She lived there on and off, making extended visits with her parents, who had both acquired houses in the area. Her father won custody when she was in third grade, and she moved with him to Lloyd Harbor, a village of the Town of Huntington, Long Island.

According to Waïte, when Phillips was 13 years old, her half-sister Mackenzie informed Bijou of her (Mackenzie's) 10-year incestuous relationship with their father, and the information had a devastating effect on Bijou's teenage years, stripping her of her innocence and leaving her "wary of [her] father".

At 14, Phillips left school and moved into her own apartment with a housekeeper, just off Fifth Avenue. Once described by The Observer as a "wild child", she experienced a rebellious childhood in New York City, where she used to party, drink and take drugs, such as cocaine, ecstasy, and heroin. On this period of her life, she remarked: "If you were 14 years old and able to live on your own in an apartment in New York City, and you got invited to all these clubs, and you got a bank account and you had a car service you could call so that you could go wherever you wanted ... What would happen?" At 17, following the death of a friend, the 20-year-old Manhattan socialite Davide Sorrenti, her father sent her into rehab. Growing up, she became something of a local tabloids' fixture due to her late-night persona and association with other socialites like sisters Paris and Nicky Hilton. She claimed she lost her virginity to rock singer Evan Dando when she was 15 and he was about 27 or 28.

== Career ==
=== Beginnings (1994–1999) ===
Phillips was on the cover of Interview magazine when she was 13. Shortly thereafter, she appeared on the cover of Vogue Italia. Phillips also became an image model for Calvin Klein and appeared in several advertising campaigns in which adolescents showed white underwear. The campaigns were widely condemned as eerily pedophilic. She has expressed her distaste for the modeling world, and once stated in an interview: "It was like, I wanted to go swimming in the ocean, but I was jumping up and down in a puddle."

After signing a record deal at age 17, Phillips began working on her debut album I'd Rather Eat Glass, produced by Jerry Harrison. It was released on May 11, 1999, by Almo Sounds, and remains her only full-length music release to date. The album's title refers to her past as a fashion model, saying she would "rather eat glass" than go back to modeling. Phillips collaborated with a number of artists when writing songs for the album, including Eric Bazilian, Greg Wells, Dave Bassett, Howard Jones and Jill Cunniff. Upon its release, I'd Rather Eat Glass received mixed reviews from music critics, mostly criticising the work for being immature, but her musical style has been positively compared to Natalie Imbruglia or Kay Hanley of Letters to Cleo.

Phillips made her film debut in a brief role of the independent drama Sugar Town (1999). Her first major film role came the same year, as an Upper East Side girl trying to fit in with the black hip-hop crowd, in James Toback's drama Black and White, opposite Robert Downey Jr., Jared Leto, Brooke Shields and Elijah Wood. The film received mixed reviews and found a limited audience in theaters, but AllMovie remarked: "[The film] starts off strong with a provocative performance by newcomer Bijou Phillips as the most unapologetic seeker of approval from her hip-hop-loving friends. Phillips eventually fades into the background, and the film becomes hampered by Toback's insistence upon grafting a standard crime-drama plot".

=== Acting breakthrough (2000–2005) ===
Phillips appeared with Kate Hudson in Cameron Crowe's semi-biographical musical drama Almost Famous (2000). The film was a critical success and received four Academy Award nominations. She also was the cover model for the April 2000 issue of Playboy magazine, posing nude in that issue. 2001 saw Phillips star in two independent coming-of-age films. In Tart, opposite Dominique Swain and Melanie Griffith, she played the longtime friend of a young woman at a preparatory school in 1980s New York City. PopMatters found Phillips to be one of the only intriguing actors in the film, "thanks to yet another fearless performance".

In Bully, based on the 1993 murder of Bobby Kent, she played one of several young adults in South Florida who plotted to murder a mutual friend that had emotionally, physically and sexually abused them for years. The film received a mixed critical response, but famed critic Roger Ebert was a notable admirer who gave it four out of four stars. Her performance in the film led The Hollywood Reporter to name her one of 2002's "Shooting Stars of Tomorrow".

In 2003, Phillips starred alongside Mischa Barton as a member of a bizarre cult of young criminals in the thriller Octane, which premiered at the Cannes Film Festival. In 2004, she played the nanny of an author's young daughter, with Jeff Bridges and Kim Basinger, in The Door in the Floor (2004), a drama with heavy sexual themes adapted from the novel A Widow for One Year by John Irving. She also voiced the character Helena Wankstein, one of the optional in game girlfriends in Grand Theft Auto: San Andreas. Phillips starred with Anne Hathaway in the crime drama Havoc (2005) as a spoiled socialite. ViewLondon wrote that the "supporting cast are superb, particularly Bijou Phillips" as the "trashy best friend", while Variety asserted: "As played by Hathaway and Phillips, the friendship between [their characters] rings girlish and true, and comes complete with tantalizing, lesbian-flavored moments". Havoc was not released in theaters in the United States due to unfavorable critical reception. She appeared as an ill-fated high school senior in the slasher film Venom (also 2005), produced by Kevin Williamson.

=== Horror films (2006–2009) ===
In 2007, Phillips starred in the independent horror film The Wizard of Gore, as the girlfriend of a magic magazine's publisher. She also collaborated with actress Lauren German in three films, the first of which was the comedy drama Spin, about seven people at a popular Los Angeles nightclub. In Hostel: Part II, which served as a sequel to Hostel (2005), Phillips starred as one of three American female art students in Rome who are directed to a Slovak village, where they are kidnapped and taken to a facility in which rich clients pay to torture and kill people. She claimed that her torture sequence, which entails her being scalped by a power saw, required around forty-five setups. "I don't think I could do something like this again", she stated in a 2007 interview. "I'm glad that I had the experience, and I love my job, but we went into places that I didn't know existed, and I don't need to do that again." Banned from theatrical release in several countries, Hostel: Part II was released theatrically in the United States, to lackluster box office returns.

The biographical film What We Do Is Secret featured Phillips as Lorna Doom, the Germs' bassist and a close friend of singer Darby Crash. Director Rodger Grossman cast Phillips when she was 17 years old, and she stayed committed to the project for almost a decade as he worked to bring the film into production. She received critical acclaim for her portrayal; Phil Gallo for Variety found her performance to be "striking" and stated that her character "lights up in a unique way whenever she's in Crash's company or simply talking about him". In 2008, Phillips appeared in a documentary about the Hotel Chelsea called Chelsea on the Rocks, directed by Abel Ferrara. She also starred, opposite Sam Rockwell and Anjelica Huston, as a milkmaid in the well-received black comedy Choke, based on the Chuck Palahniuk's novel of the same name. In her last film of 2008, Dark Streets, Phillips played the alluring star singer of a club in 1930s New York City.

In 2009, Phillips had starring roles in four independent feature films, three of which were opposite Danny Masterson. Her first release in the year was the romantic comedy Wake, in which she played an emotionally isolated modern woman who meets a man mourning his fiancée at a funeral. The horror film It's Alive, a remake of the 1974 film of the same name written and directed by Larry Cohen, saw Phillips star as the mother of a murderous baby. Dread Central, in its review for the film, noted: "Bijou Philips is undoubtedly the star here, jumping into her role in what is admittedly just a piece of schlock cinema with great aplomb". In the comedy Made for Each Other, Phillips reunited with Lauren German to play a woman whose husband decides the only way to morally rectify his cheating is to get his wife to cheat on him. Her last 2009 film was the crime drama The Bridge to Nowhere, portraying a sex worker.

=== Television and hiatus (2010–present) ===
In FOX's sitcom Raising Hope (2010–2014), Phillips played the title character's biological mother, a serial killer sentenced to death. She appeared in a total of seven episodes of the series. In 2010 and 2012, she guest-starred in episodes of the police procedural television series Hawaii Five-0 and Law & Order: Special Victims Unit, and in 2011 she appeared in the video for Broken Social Scene's song "Sweetest Kill".

== Personal life ==
Phillips dated Sean Lennon in the mid-2000s and became the subject matter of his 2006 album Friendly Fire.

In 2004, Phillips began dating actor Danny Masterson and the two were married in October 2011. They were both Scientologists at the time. On February 14, 2014, Phillips gave birth to their daughter. Phillips starred with Masterson in several films and in a 2011 episode of Fox's Raising Hope.

In November 2017, actor Daniel Franzese alleged that Phillips had "ridiculed" him about his sexuality and weight, and physically assaulted him on the set of Bully. Phillips subsequently apologized for her behavior. The same month, actress Heather Matarazzo claimed that Phillips had held her against a wall and choked her shortly before filming for Hostel: Part II began.

Phillips has defended both her father and her husband (the former accused of rape and incest by Phillips's half-sister Mackenzie; the latter convicted of the rape and sexual assault of multiple women) following allegations of their sexual abuse. Of Mackenzie's allegations of sexual assault against their father, Phillips said in 2009: "I'm 29 now, I've talked to everyone who was around during that time, I've asked the hard questions. I do not believe my sister. Our father [was] many things. This is not one of them." Phillips also stated that Mackenzie told her about their incestuous relationship, and that the news was "confusing and scary" and that she was "heartbroken" to think that her family left her alone with her father. In a 2000 interview with Bruce LaBruce, she discussed a song she had written about her father with the refrain, "He touched me wrong", but did not go into detail about whether the lyrics referred to herself or someone else.

In May 2023, Phillips's husband Masterson was convicted of raping two women in 2003, and charges from a third woman resulted in a hung jury. In September 2023, Masterson was sentenced to 30 years to life in prison. Later that month, she filed for divorce. Once Masterson was expelled from the Church of Scientology and labeled a "suppressive person", members were ordered to cut ties under the Church's disconnection rules. Not wanting to deprive their daughter of a relationship with her father, Philips made the decision to leave Scientology.

=== Health problems ===
It was revealed in February 2017 that Phillips had been suffering from kidney disease for five years, stemming from congenital renal hypoplasia. Phillips spent the first three months of her life in a neonatal intensive care unit due to the condition. Her husband Masterson stated that she had suffered from a blood infection and was in need of a transplant, which she later received in April 2017. In February 2026, Phillips revealed on her Instagram page that she was in desperate need of a new, live kidney donation, as the one that had been donated to her in 2017 by a friend had failed.

== Filmography ==
=== Film ===
Year	Title	Role	Notes
1999	Sugar Town	Autograph Girl	
1999	Black and White	Charlie	
2000	Almost Famous	Estrella Starr	
2001	Fast Sofa	Tracy	
2001	Tart	Delilah Milford	
2001	Bully	Ali Willis	
2003	Octane	Backpacker	
2004	The Door in the Floor	Alice	
2005	Pancho's Pizza	—N/a	Short film
2005	Havoc	Emily	
2005	Venom	Tammy	
2005	The Outsider	Herself	Documentary
2006	Friendly Fire	The Lover	
2007	Spin	Aubrey	
2007	The Wizard of Gore	Maggie	
2007	Hostel: Part II	Whitney Swerling	
2007	What We Do Is Secret	Lorna Doom	
2008	Chelsea on the Rocks	Nancy Spungen	Documentary
2008	The Art of Travel	Christina Layne	
2008	Choke	Ursula	
2008	Dark Streets	Crystal	
2009	Rosencrantz and Guildenstern Are Undead	Lauren Lamont	
2009	Wake	Carys Reitman	
2009	Made for Each Other	Marcy	
2009	The Heart Is a Drum Machine	Herself	Documentary
2009	The Bridge to Nowhere	Jasper	
2009	It's Alive	Lenore Harker	
2010	Black Limousine	Erica Long	Final film role

=== Television ===
Year	Title	Role	Notes
2006	CSI: Crime Scene Investigation	Lil' Cherry	Episode: "Kiss-Kiss, Bye-Bye"
2006	Totally Awesome	Karelynn (uncredited)	TV movie
2010	Hawaii Five-0	Camille	Episode: "Heihei"
2010–2013	Raising Hope	Lucy Carlyle	Recurring, 7 episodes
2012	Law & Order: Special Victims Unit	Dia Nobile	Episode: "Vanity's Bonfire"

=== Video games ===
Year	Title	Role	Notes
2004	Grand Theft Auto: San Andreas	Helena Wankstein	Voice
2021	Grand Theft Auto: The Trilogy – The Definitive Edition	Helena Wankstein	Voice; Archival recordings

== Discography ==
Albums

- I'd Rather Eat Glass (1999)

Singles

List of singles, with selected chart positions
Title	Year	Peak chart positions	Album
Title	Year	AUS	Album
"When I Hated Him (Don't Tell Me)"	1999	82	I'd Rather Eat Glass

Promotional singles

- "Hawaii" (1999)
