= Kate Micucci =

American actress (born 1980)

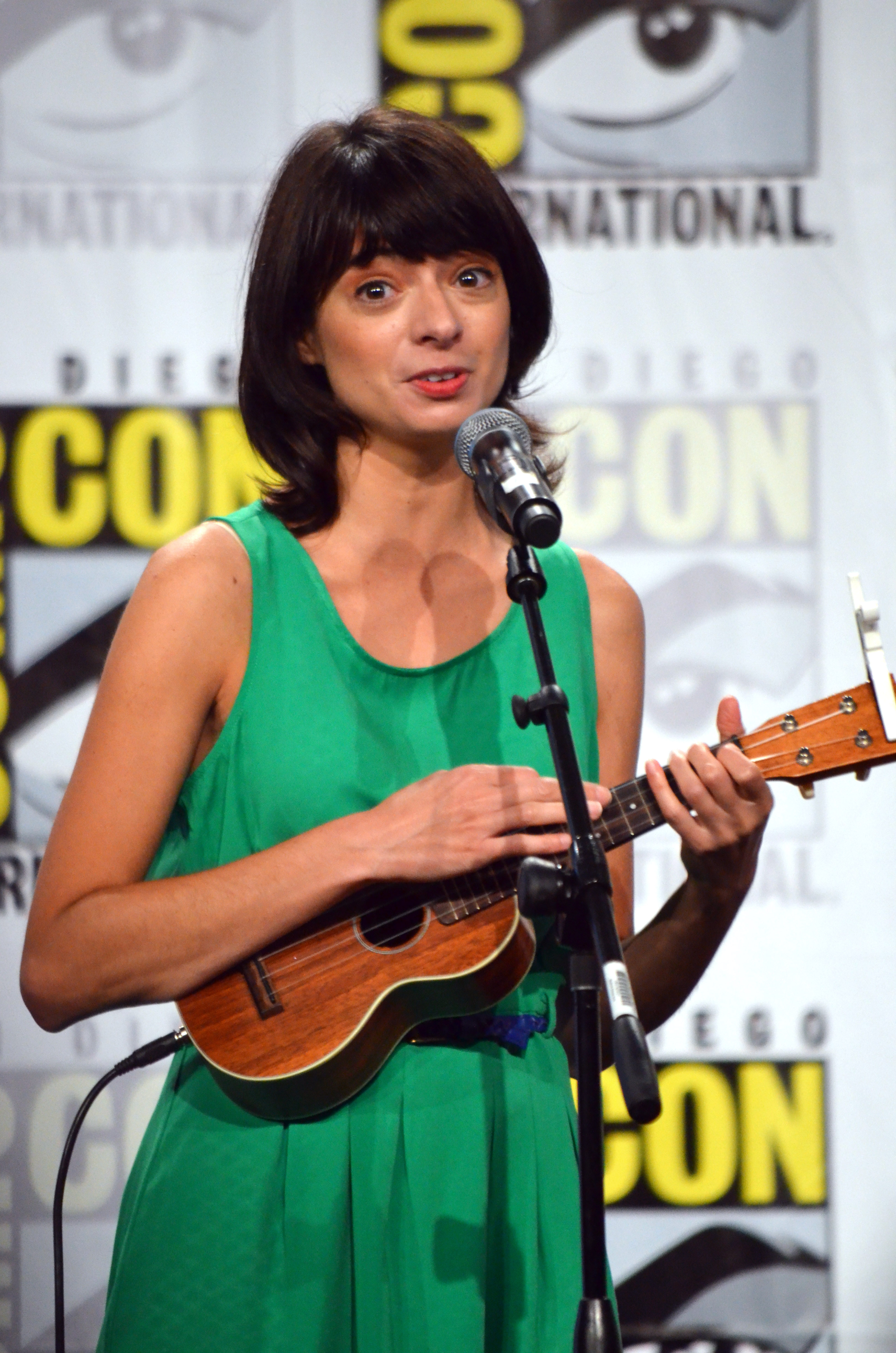
- Micucci at the 2012 San Diego Comic-Con
- Born: March 31, 1980 (age 46); Jersey City, New Jersey, U.S.
- Other name: Oates
- Education: Loyola Marymount University (BA)
- Occupations: Actress; comedian; musician; street artist
- Years active: 2006–present
- Spouse: Jake Sinclair (m. 2018)
- Children: 1
- Musical career
- Genres: Folk; comedy
- Instruments: Vocals; ukulele; guitar
- Member of: Garfunkel and Oates
- Website: www.katemicucci.com

Kate Micucci (/mɪˈkuːtʃi/ mih-KOO-chee; born March 31, 1980) is an American actress, comedian, musician, and street artist who is half of the musical comedy duo Garfunkel and Oates with Riki Lindhome.

Her acting roles include Softabitha in Adventure Time: Side Quests, Stephanie Gooch in Scrubs, Ally in 'Til Death, Shelley in Raising Hope, Lucy in The Big Bang Theory, Sadie Miller in Steven Universe, Velma Dinkley in Scooby-Doo, Webby Vanderquack in DuckTales, Daisy in Nature Cat, Julie in Motorcity, Stacey in Guillermo del Toro's Cabinet of Curiosities, and Dr. Fox in Unikitty!

== Early life and education ==
Micucci was born in Jersey City, New Jersey to a family of Italian descent. She grew up in Nazareth, Pennsylvania in the Lehigh Valley region of eastern Pennsylvania and was raised as a Catholic. She learned to play classical piano from her mother.

Micucci graduated from Nazareth Area High School in 1998. She received an A.A. in fine arts from Keystone College in La Plume, Pennsylvania, and a B.A. in studio art from Loyola Marymount University in Los Angeles in 2003.

== Career ==
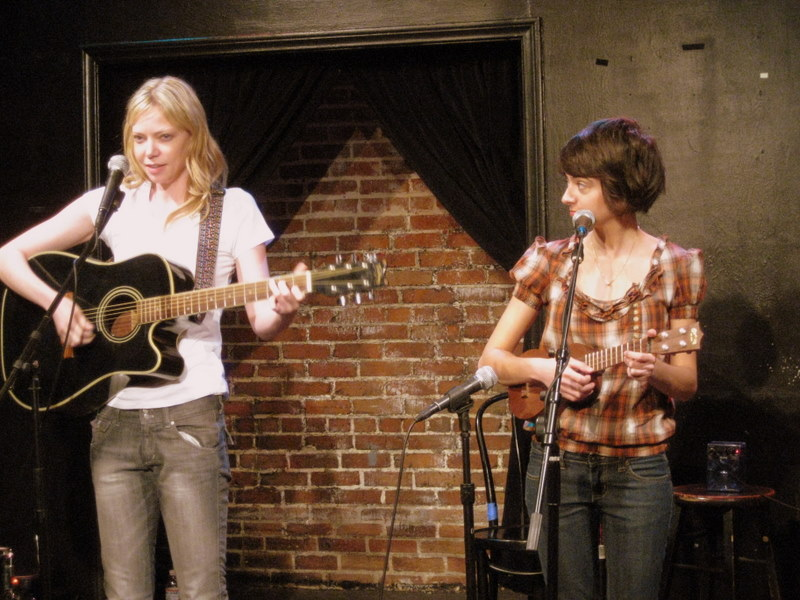
Micucci performing as Garfunkel and Oates with Riki Lindhome at Upright Citizens Brigade Theatre in New York City in February 2009

Micucci's television credits include numerous television commercials and acting roles, including Toni the barista on NBC's Four Kings, guest roles on Malcolm in the Middle, 'Til Death, How I Met Your Mother, Cory in the House, The Big Bang Theory, and Campus Ladies, and recurring roles on Scrubs and Raising Hope. Her film credits include The Last Hurrah, Bart Got a Room, and When in Rome. She played Lily the IT girl on Elevator, produced by HBO's Runawaybox. In early 2009, she released a five-track EP entitled Songs.

Micucci appeared in five episodes of Scrubs ("My Lawyer's in Love", "My Absence", "My Chief Concern", "Our Histories", and "My Finale") as Stephanie Gooch, a ukulele player with whom Ted Buckland begins a relationship. She performs her song "Mr. Moon" and an adapted version of "Fuck You" (retitled "Screw You" for ABC), a song she typically performs as part of the musical duo Garfunkel and Oates. In 2009, she starred in the short film Imaginary Larry, co-written and co-directed by Riki Lindhome, her partner in Garfunkel and Oates. In August 2009, Micucci appeared in an advertising campaign for Hillshire Farms and for H & R Block in January 2010.

In 2010, Micucci appeared in the Kristen Bell film When in Rome and in an episode in the sixth season of the TV show Weeds as a slightly sedated waitress. She appeared in some episodes of the HBO series Bored to Death and appeared as Shelley on series Raising Hope. Micucci was originally cast as Jimmy's cousin in the pilot that was filmed December 2009. Her role was recast by Skyler Stone as Mike, changing the character Micucci originated from Jimmy's cousin to Sabrina's cousin, Shelley.

From 2009 to October 2011, she performed "Playin' with Micucci" on the third Monday of the month at The Steve Allen Theater in Hollywood, California. In the act, she presented "songs and stories in [a] musical variety show." Micucci said the title was the only dirty aspect of the show. She frequently performed (as "Oates") with Lindhome (as "Garfunkel") in "An Evening with Garfunkel and Oates" at the Upright Citizens Brigade Theater in Los Angeles. She performed with William H. Macy on the ukulele to promote the DVD release of the film Bart Got a Room. The video has been circulated around the Internet on sites such as YouTube and The Huffington Post.

In February 2011, Micucci appeared briefly in a Progressive Insurance ad as a waitress. She has voiced a character on Pendleton Ward's animated series Adventure Time, and as the character of Julie Kane on the Disney XD animated series Motorcity. She voiced the recurring character Sadie Miller on the Cartoon Network animated series Steven Universe. In July 2012, Kate appeared in Written by a Kid's production Scary Smash, a Geek & Sundry creation that was executive produced by Kim Evey, Felicia Day, and Sheri Byrant.

In January 2013, Micucci's casting was announced for a recurring role on The Big Bang Theory as "a potential love interest for ... Raj." Her character, the painfully shy Lucy, first appeared on February 14, 2013. Micucci appeared as a guest judge on King of the Nerds.

Since October 2015, Micucci has provided the voice of Velma Dinkley in various Scooby-Doo franchise projects, beginning with the animated television series Be Cool, Scooby-Doo!

In 2016, she was the lead in a film for the first time in Unleashed and co-starred in a season one episode of the Netflix comedy-drama series Easy, reprising her role for the series' second and third seasons. From 2017 to 2021, she voiced Webby Vanderquack in the reboot of DuckTales. Also in 2017, Micucci voiced Doctor Fox in Unikitty and in 2018, she starred in Seven Stages to Achieve Eternal Bliss.

Her debut solo album My Hat, a collection of children's music, was released in November 2023.

== Personal life ==
Micucci married musician and recording producer Jake Sinclair in February 2018. They live in Los Angeles and New York. She gave birth to their son in January 2020.

In December 2023, Micucci underwent surgery for lung cancer. She stated that the cancer was caught early and the surgery was able to remove it.

Micucci has created street art on found objects throughout New York City. Her work includes drawings on discarded furniture found on city streets and is characterized by whimsical, cartoon-style imagery intended to spread joy. She has also created exterior drawings at Jazba, an Indian restaurant in the East Village.

== Discography ==
=== Studio albums ===
Title	Album details
My Hat	Released: November 3, 2023; Label: Self-released; Formats: digital download

=== EPs ===
Title	Album details
Songs	Released: January 25, 2009; Label: Self-released; Formats: digital download
EP Phone Home	Released: November 22, 2010; Label: Self-released; Formats: digital download

=== Singles ===
Title	Year	Album
"The Working Dead"	2018	Steven Universe: Vol. 2 (Original Soundtrack)
"You Got a Bike"	2018	Non-album single
"Let Me Ska My Van Into Your Heart"	2019	Steven Universe: Vol. 2 (Original Soundtrack)
"Mister Rogers"	2023	My Hat
"Bucket of Beans"	2023	My Hat
"Grocery Store"	2023	My Hat
"Ghosts of Pasadena"	2023	My Hat
"You Got a Bike (Sped Up Version)"	2023	Non-album single

=== Guest appearances ===
List of non-single guest appearances, with other performing artists, showing year released and album name
Title	Year	Other artist(s)	Album
"Doreen the Whale"	2011	Grant-Lee Phillips & Sara Watkins	The Animal Within Us (Caring is Cool Presents)
"We Belong Together"	2012	Johnny Blu	The Ukulele Experience, Vol. One
"Hey Johnny, Open Your Eyes"	2012	Johnny Blu	The Ukulele Experience, Vol. One
"A Christmas Song"	2014	Jim Parsons	Elf: Buddy's Musical Christmas (Original Soundtrack)
"A Christmas Song (Reprise)"	2014	Rachel Bloom, Max Charles, Larry Dorf, Mark Hamill, Rachael MacFarlane, Rachel Ramras, Kevin Shinick, & Jim Parsons	Elf: Buddy's Musical Christmas (Original Soundtrack)
"The Story of Buddy the Elf"	2014	Fred Armisen, Ed Asner, Rachel Bloom, Max Charles, Larry Dorf, Gilbert Gottfried, Mark Hamill, Steve Higgins, Rachael MacFarlane, Rachel Ramras, Kevin Shinick, & Jim Parsons	Elf: Buddy's Musical Christmas (Original Soundtrack)
"The Working Dead"	2019	—N/a	Steven Universe: Vol. 2 (Original Soundtrack)
"Sadie Killer and the Suspects"	2019	—N/a	Steven Universe: Vol. 2 (Original Soundtrack)
"G-G-G-Ghost"	2019	—N/a	Steven Universe: Vol. 2 (Original Soundtrack)
"Let Me Ska My Van Into Your Heart"	2019	—N/a	Steven Universe: Vol. 2 (Original Soundtrack)
"Disobedient"	2019	Michaela Dietz	Steven Universe the Movie (Original Soundtrack)
"Finale"	2019	Zach Callison, Deedee Magno Hall, Estelle, Michaela Dietz, Grace Rolek, Uzo Aduba, Jennifer Paz, Shelby Rabara, Matthew Moy, Tom Scharpling, Toks Olagundoye	Steven Universe the Movie (Original Soundtrack)
"Looking Forward"	2020	—N/a	Steven Universe Future (Original Soundtrack)

=== Garfunkel and Oates ===
==== Studio albums ====
- All Over Your Face (2011)
- Slippery When Moist (2012)
- Secretions (2015)

==== EPs ====
- Music Songs (2009)

== Awards ==
On December 30, 2009, G4TV named Micucci the #1 Woman of Comedy.
