= Slum tourism =

Visiting impoverished areas

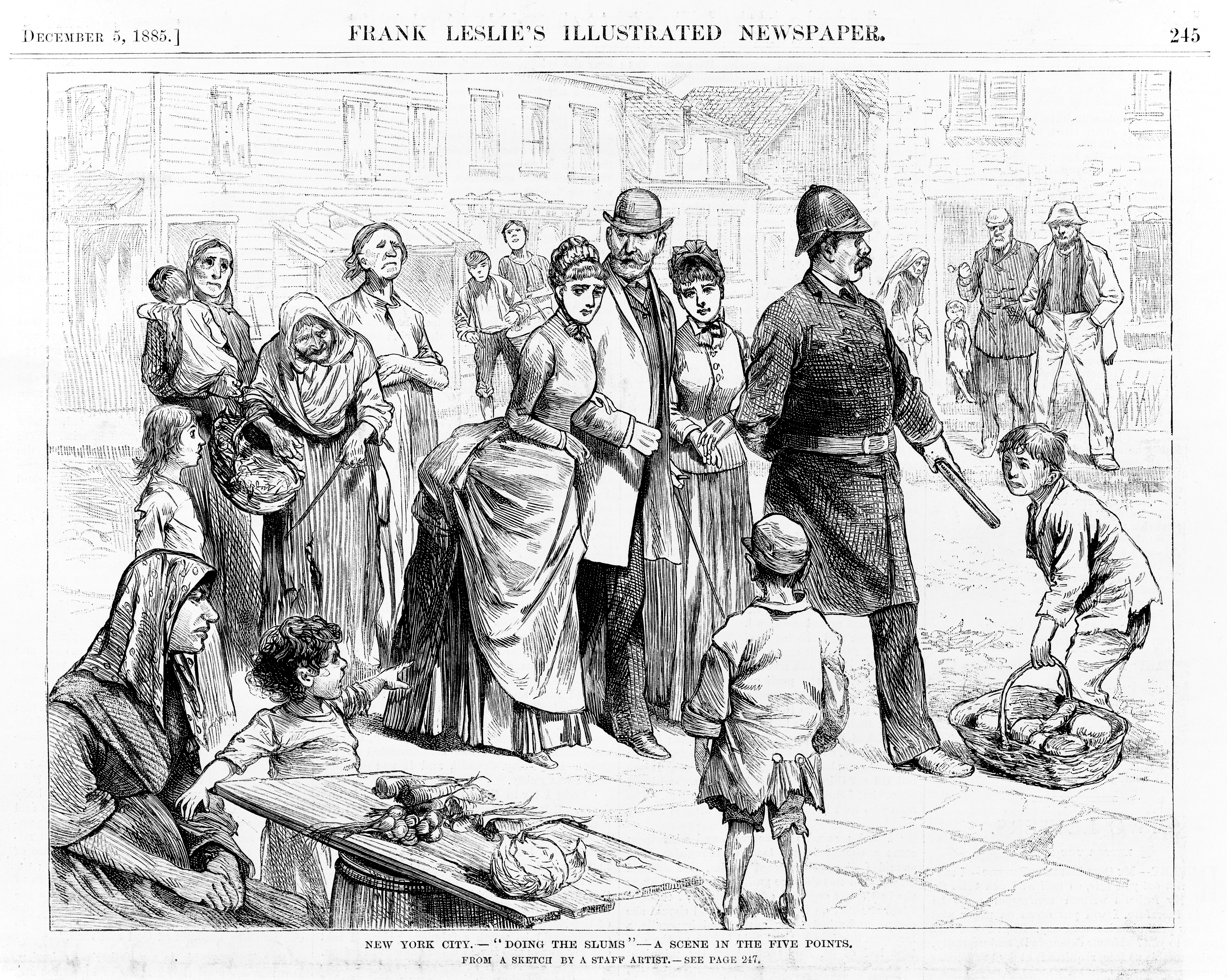
Slum tourism in Five Points, Manhattan, in 1885

Slum tourism, poverty tourism, ghetto tourism or trauma tourism is a type of tourism that involves visiting impoverished areas, or in some cases, areas that were affected by disasters, such as nuclear fallout zones like Chernobyl or Fukushima (hence the term "trauma tourism"). Originally focused on the slums and ghettos of London and Manhattan in the 19th century, slum tourism is now prominent in South Africa, India, Brazil, Kenya, and the Philippines.

== History ==
Bed and breakfast inside a South African township

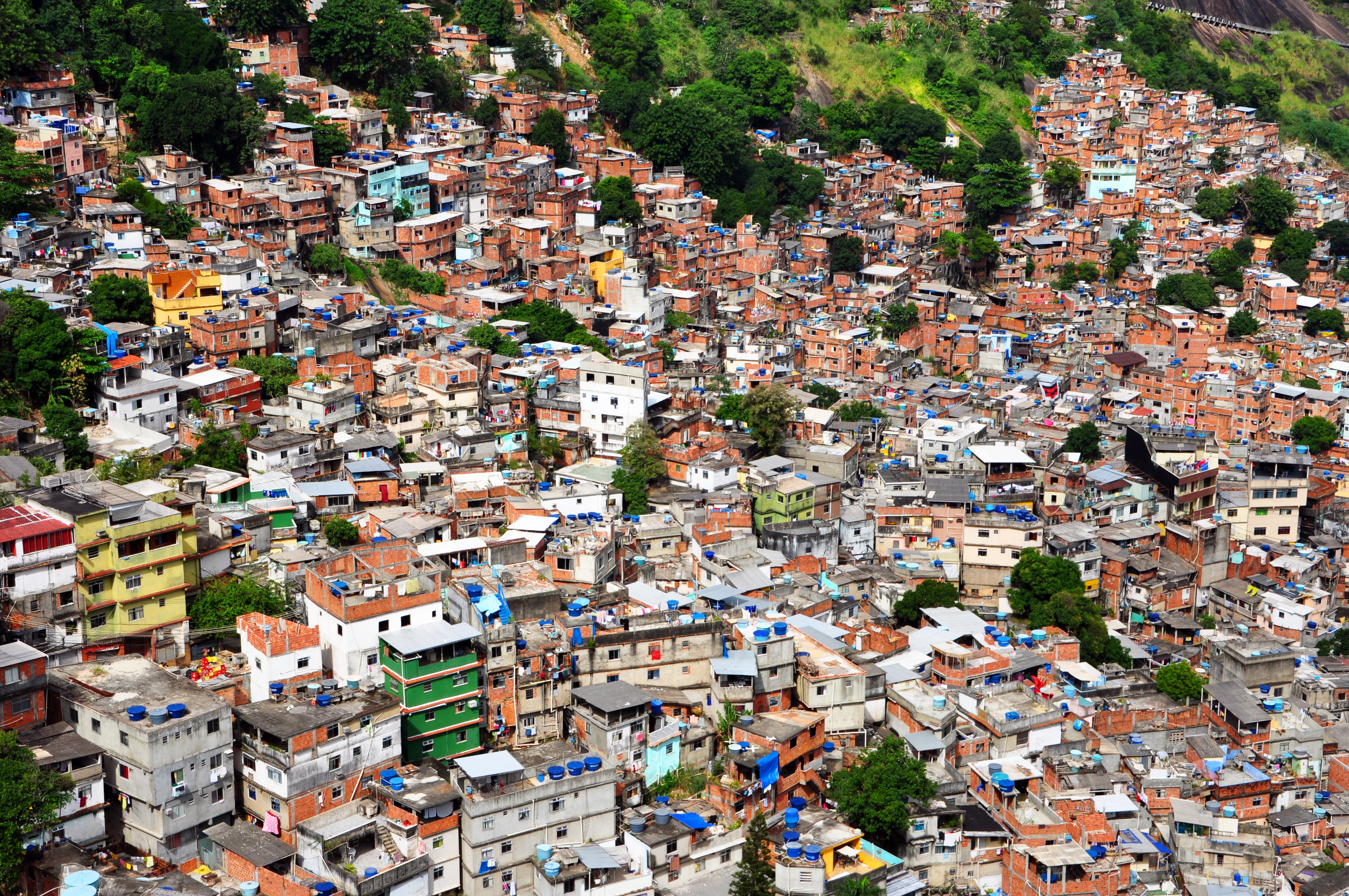
The hill slum (favela) of Rocinha in Rio de Janeiro, Brazil, is a prominent destination for international tourists in the region.

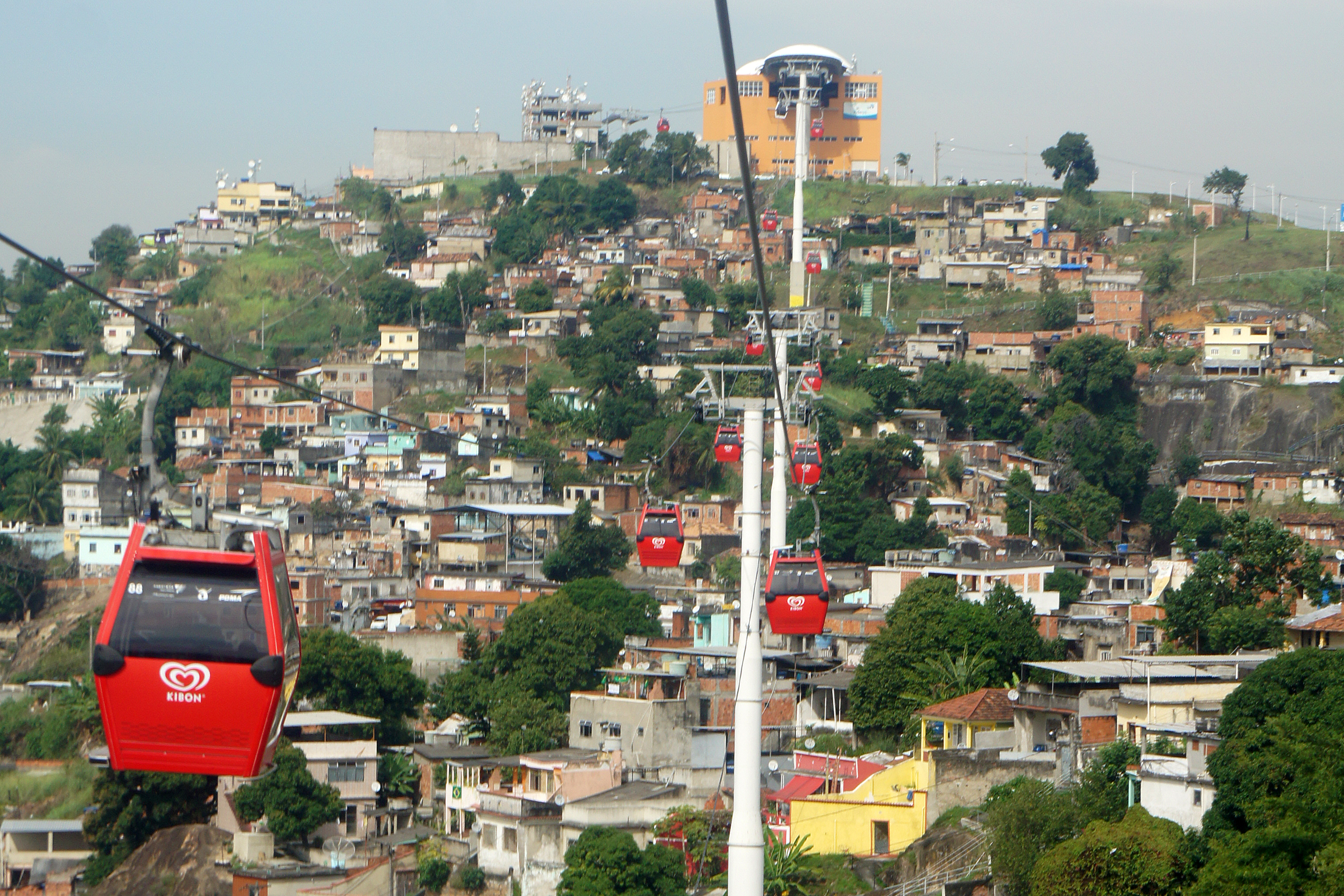
Aerial tramway of the Complexo do Alemão, Rio de Janeiro. Used for favela commuters to the closer urban train station and tourist alike

Slums have always been at the receiving end of curiosity. The word slum appeared in the English language in around 1840 as it was used by upper class Londoners to describe the East End of London. The word slumming was used to describe the common practice of rich London citizens visiting the East End guided by police officers in civilian fashion, journalists, and clergymen. In the 1880s, slumming became a tourist phenomenon, as wealthy British tourists wanted to visit areas of New York such as Bowery. Tourist guides were published, including walking tours through impoverished urban areas. Tour operators also started to guide slum tourists in Manhattan, Chicago, and San Francisco.

In the 1980s in South Africa, black residents organized township tours to educate the whites in local governments on how the black population lived. Such tours attracted international tourists, who wanted to learn more about apartheid.

In the mid-1990s, international tours were organized with destinations in the most disadvantaged areas of developing nations, often known as slums. They have grown in popularity, and are often run and advertised by professional companies. In Cape Town, over 300,000 tourists visit the city each year to view the slums.

Ghetto tourism was first studied in 2005 by Michael Stephens in the cultural-criticism journal PopMatters. Ghetto tourism includes all forms of entertainment — gangsta rap, video games, movies, TV, and other forms that allow consumers to traffic in the inner city without leaving home. International tourists to New York City in the 1980s led to a successful tourism boom in Harlem. By 2002, Philadelphia began offering tours of blighted inner-city neighborhoods. After Hurricane Katrina, tours were offered in flood-ravaged Lower Ninth Ward, a notoriously violent and poor section of New Orleans. The Wire Tour is a tour of slums in Baltimore.

Prior to the release of Slumdog Millionaire in 2008, Mumbai was a slum tourist destination.

In December 2010, the first international conference on slum tourism was held in Bristol. A social network of people working in or with slum tourism has been set up.

== Locations ==
Slum tourism is mainly performed in urban areas and metropolitan cities of developing countries, most often named after the type of areas that are visited:

- Township tourism: in post-apartheid South Africa and Namibia. South African settlements are still visibly divided into wealthy, historically white suburbs and poor, historically black townships, because of the effects of apartheid and racial segregation.
- Favela tourism: in Brazil
- Economic disparities in India: Various places including Dharavi in Mumbai and Royapuram in Chennai.
- Social or religious divisions: New York City, North America and Belfast, Northern Ireland.
- Similarly, after Hurricane Katrina, impoverished areas of Louisiana became slum tourist attractions as a result of disaster tourism.
- It is also encouraged by direct or indirect mention of certain areas by popular artists. Travel to certain parts of Detroit that include 8 Mile Road, known for the role the travel route played in the similarly titled 8 Mile film starring Eminem, or to Crenshaw Boulevard in South Los Angeles, a metropolitan area that inspired an entire generation of pioneering musical influence are examples.
- Charleroi, in Belgium, is another example of this phenomenon in a developed country.

== Motivations ==
A 2010 study by the University of Pennsylvania showed that tourists in Mumbai's Dharavi slum were motivated primarily by curiosity, as opposed to several competing push factors such as social comparison, entertainment, education, or self-actualization. In addition, the study found that most slum residents were ambivalent about the tours, while the majority of tourists reported positive feelings during the tour, with interest and intrigue as the most commonly cited feelings. Many tourists often come to the slums to put their life in perspective.

Stevens wrote: "The demand for shows that provide a window into the ghetto—from street-real network crime shows like COPS to super-realistic cable series like The Wire—has expanded in direct proportion to the increasing safety of American middle class life ... . As digital media achieves more detailed simulations of reality, ... the quest for thrills mutates into a desire, not just to see bigger and better explosions, but to cross class and racial boundaries and experience other lifestyles."

== Criticism ==
Slum tourism has been the subject of much controversy, with critics labelling the voyeuristic aspects of slum tourism as poverty porn. Both critiques and defenses of the practice have been made in the editorial pages of prominent newspapers, such as the New York Times, Wall Street Journal, London Times, and others. A primary accusation that the advocates against slum tourism make is that it "turns poverty into entertainment, something that can be momentarily experienced and then escaped from". Kennedy Odede, a Kenyan, wrote in The New York Times Op-Ed section, "They get photos; we lose a piece of our dignity." Critics call the tours voyeuristic and exploitative. Slum tourism critics have also cited the fact that Christmas and Valentine's Day as common times for slum tourism further supporting the belief that Westerners often visit slums just to "feel better about themselves" during those holidays when most people are with families and significant others.

The tours provide employment and income for tour guides from the slums, an opportunity for craft-workers to sell souvenirs, and may invest back in the community with profit that is earned. Similarly, the argument has been raised that well-off tourists may be more motivated to help as a result.

In 2013, controversy arose when "Real Bronx Tours" offered tours of the Bronx in New York City, advertised as "a ride through a real New York City 'ghetto'...[the borough] was notorious for drugs, gangs, crime and murders". Borough President Ruben Diaz Jr. and New York City Councilwoman Melissa Mark-Viverito condemned the tours stating "Using the Bronx to sell a so-called 'ghetto' experience to tourists is completely unacceptable and the highest insult to the communities we represent." The tours were soon discontinued.

Controversy has also arisen over the announcement of a tourism package which offered overnight stay in Mumbai's slums, along with usage of public toilets there, in 2018. The package was announced by Dutch citizen and volunteer David Bijal along with slum resident Ravi Sansi. Bijal told the British daily The Guardian, that people come to Mumbai slums only to post photos on Facebook; instead, his package is aimed at getting to know the slums better. Bijal also said that the money given by the tourists will be given to the households where they stay. While various NGOs have criticized the program for selling poverty, others have argued that such programs are needed to change the people's perception of slums.

== See also ==
- "Common People", 1995 Pulp single about a slum tourist, specifically in relation to social class in the United Kingdom
- Havoc, a 2005 film in which the protagonists engage in slum tourism
- Disaster tourism
- Human zoo
- Ruins photography
- Urban exploration
