= Danny Masterson =

American actor (born 1976)

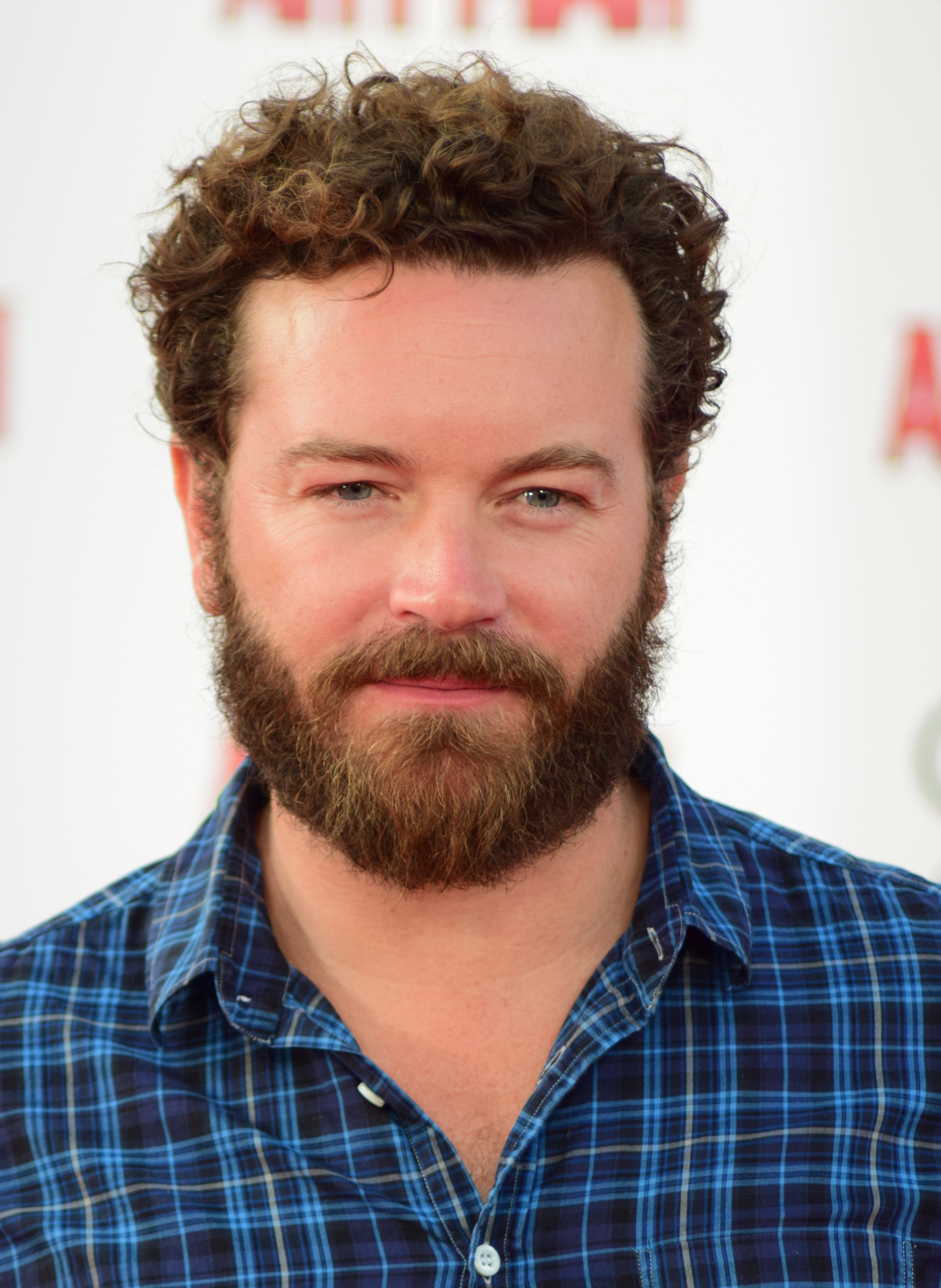
- Masterson in 2015
- Born: Daniel Peter Masterson; March 13, 1976 (age 50); Albertson, New York, U.S.
- Occupation: Actor
- Years active: 1980–2018
- Spouse: Bijou Phillips (m. 2011; sep. 2023)
- Children: 1
- Relatives: Christopher Masterson (brother); Jordan Masterson (half-brother); Alanna Masterson (half-sister); Angus T. Jones (cousin)
- Criminal information
- Status: Incarcerated
- Conviction: Two felony counts of rape
- Criminal charge: Three felony counts of rape
- Penalty: Life imprisonment with a minimum term of 30 years

Details
- Imprisoned at: California Men's Colony

Daniel Peter Masterson (born March 13, 1976) is an American actor. He portrayed Steven Hyde in That '70s Show (1998–2006), Milo Foster in Men at Work (2012–2014), and Jameson "Rooster" Bennett in The Ranch (2016–2018).

In 2023, Masterson was convicted of raping two women in 2003, and is currently serving a 30 years to life prison sentence. A third count of rape resulted in a hung jury. Masterson is a Scientologist, as were his victims at the time of the assaults. The Church of Scientology's attempts to silence the victims, and other interference, delayed for 20 years the bringing of the crimes to justice.

== Early life and family ==
Masterson was born on Long Island, New York, to Carol and Peter Masterson. He grew up in Albertson, Garden City, and East Williston in Nassau County. Masterson has a brother, actor Christopher Masterson, who played Francis on Malcolm in the Middle. Their maternal half-siblings, Jordan Masterson and Alanna Masterson, are also actors. He also has a paternal half-brother, Will Masterson.

== Career ==
=== Early years ===
Starting at age four, Masterson worked as a child model, and at age five, was featured in magazine articles as well as television commercials. Masterson starred in musicals at the age of eight and began acting as well. His singing voice "disappeared" by his teenage years. By the time he was 16 years-old, Masterson had appeared in over 100 commercials, including ones for Kellogg's Frosted Flakes, Hardee's, Hostess, Tang, and Clearasil.

=== Acting career ===
In the early 1990s, Masterson had a role in Beethoven's 2nd, and starred as Justin in Cybill. After starring in the third and fourth seasons of Cybill, Masterson decided he wanted to move on and audition for a show originally titled Teenage Wasteland, which later was changed to That '70s Show.

Masterson starred in all eight seasons of That '70s Show as Steven Hyde. His role on That '70s Show launched Masterson's career, allowing him to pursue other endeavors between tapings. After the show concluded, Masterson acted in several movies and made guest appearances on television shows including Punk'd and MADtv. Along with '70s costars Ashton Kutcher and Wilmer Valderrama, he co-hosted the Fox TV special Woodstock 1999. He had a role in the 2008 comedy Yes Man. Masterson starred with his real-life future wife, Bijou Phillips, in the 2009 drama The Bridge to Nowhere.

In 2011, Masterson guest-starred as James Roland in USA Network's White Collar (episode "Where There's a Will"). He portrayed Jerry Rubin in the 2010 movie, The Chicago 8.

In 2012, the sitcom Men at Work premiered on TBS, co-starring Masterson, Michael Cassidy, James Lesure, and Adam Busch. In 2012, Masterson appeared in the film Alter Egos, directed by Jordan Galland.

Masterson starred alongside Sam Elliott, Elisha Cuthbert, and his That 70s Show costar Ashton Kutcher in the Netflix comedy series The Ranch from 2016 to 2018. His character was written out of the series in the middle of filming the third 20-episode season because of the rape and assault allegations against him. For similar reasons, he was the only surviving main or supporting cast member of That '70s Show not to be invited back to the sequel series That '90s Show, and his character, Steven Hyde, was simply not mentioned in the new series. His former castmate on That '70s Show and a fellow Scientologist, Laura Prepon, had left the Church by the time of the allegations.

=== Other ventures ===
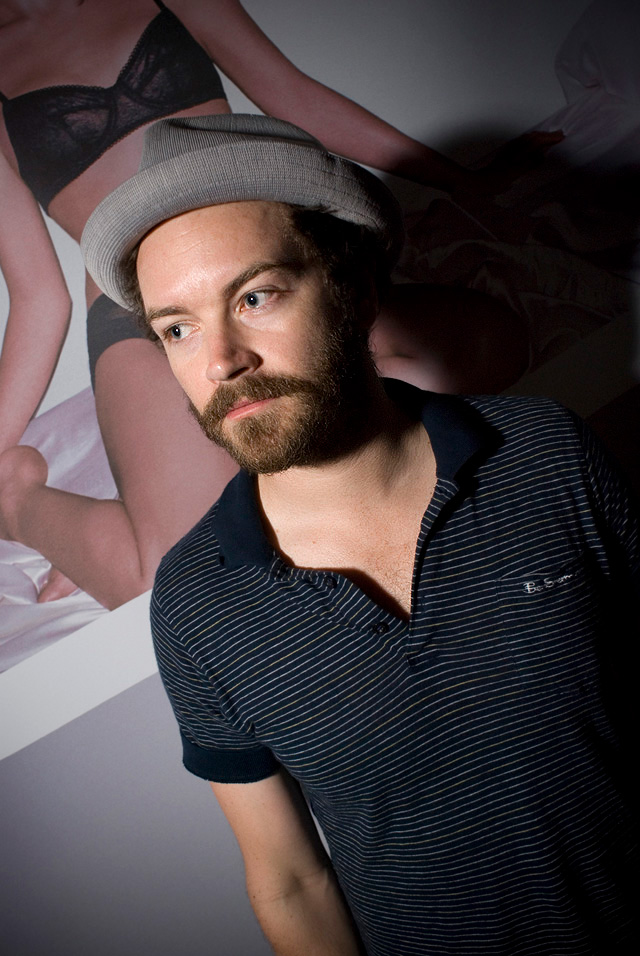
Masterson in 2007

Masterson began DJing at Los Angeles night clubs in 1997 as a hobby, under the name DJ Donkey Punch, but it soon became a side business. After Donkey Punch, he changed his name to DJ Donkey Pizzle, then DJ Mom Jeans by 2010. Masterson is a self-described "rock and hip hop fanatic", and is also a fan of indie, electro, and funk music, all of which he primarily DJed with.

For a time, Masterson owned a lounge and bar in Park City, Utah, called Downstairs.

Masterson appeared as part of a poker team, the Unabombers, in the 2005 GSN series The James Woods Gang vs. The Unabombers. He had hosted celebrity poker events, such as the Phat Farm Stuff Casino Weekend Poker Tournament, in which he won the tournament.

== Personal life ==
Masterson is a Scientologist. He started dating actress Bijou Phillips in 2004. They became engaged in 2009 and married on October 18, 2011. They have one daughter, who was born in February 2014.

On September 18, 2023, Phillips filed for divorce citing irreconcilable differences and requesting full legal and physical custody of their child, as well as spousal support.

== Legal issues ==
In March 2017, three women filed sexual assault allegations against Masterson, prompting an investigation by the Los Angeles Police Department. Masterson, through his agent, denied the allegations. In December 2017, after a fourth victim's accusations, Netflix fired Masterson from its comedy series The Ranch, saying in a statement, "Yesterday was his last day on the show, and production will resume in early 2018 without him." Masterson stated that he was "obviously very disappointed in Netflix's decision to write [his] character off of The Ranch." A few weeks later, a fifth woman made similar rape accusations. He was dropped as a client by United Talent Agency.

In November 2017, musician Cedric Bixler-Zavala of the groups The Mars Volta and At the Drive-In wrote that Masterson had sexually assaulted his wife Chrissie Carnell. Bixler-Zavala further stated that At the Drive-In's song "Incurably Innocent" (from the 2017 album In•ter a•li•a) is about the incident.

In early 2017, the show Leah Remini: Scientology and the Aftermath had filmed a two-hour episode that focused on the sexual-assault allegations against Masterson with interviews from multiple accusers. The show was planned to air during season 2, but the Los Angeles County District Attorney's office initially asked A&E not to air the episode until the office had concluded investigations and decided whether to charge Masterson. After waiting another year and a half, A&E decided to air the episode as the season 3 finale in February, but as soon as they announced it, A&E and Disney were bombarded with a campaign of attack letters from Scientologists. Though delayed, the episode finally aired six months later on August 26, 2019, as a two-hour special, titled "Waiting for Justice". One week before the airing, four accusers filed a civil suit against Masterson and the Church of Scientology.

=== Civil suit for harassment ===
Each of the four plaintiffs had been a member of the Church of Scientology at the time, as was Danny Masterson. Scientology forbids its members to report fellow members to police for any reason. After each plaintiff reported the sexual assaults to the police, she was declared a "suppressive person" and ejected from the Church.

In the civil suit, the plaintiffs alleged the Church then mobilized an aggressive harassment campaign against them, an action called fair game in Scientology practice. The plaintiffs claimed they were subjected to: stalking, physical invasion of privacy, constructive invasion of privacy, and intentional infliction of emotional distress. The campaigns against each plaintiff allegedly differed.

One plaintiff, who claimed her dog died from unexplained traumatic injuries to its trachea and esophagus, also alleged that Scientology members chased her as she drove her car, filmed her without permission, harassed her online, and posted ads to social media sites soliciting sex in her name. Another plaintiff stated that she and her neighbors observed a man snapping pictures from her driveway, and later that night, broke a window in her 13-year-old daughter's bedroom.

Masterson since responded to one of the plaintiffs in the lawsuit, claiming: "I'm not going to fight my ex-girlfriend in the media like she's been baiting me to do for more than two years. I will beat her in court—and look forward to it because the public will finally be able to learn the truth and see how I've been railroaded by this woman... and once her lawsuit is thrown out, I intend to sue her and the others who jumped on the bandwagon for the damage they caused me and my family." He did not address the stalking or harassment claims.

On January 22, 2020, Bixler-Zavala reported that a second of his family pets had to be euthanized because it had been fed rat poison wrapped inside a rolled-up piece of raw meat, alleging this was done by Scientologists in response to his repeated public statements alleging that Masterson had raped his wife (who was one of the four women who filed suit against Masterson). Masterson's wife Bijou Phillips made an Instagram post mocking court papers against Masterson.

Later, when the criminal case got underway, the parallel civil case was put on hold until after the criminal case was completed.

=== Criminal charges and trial ===
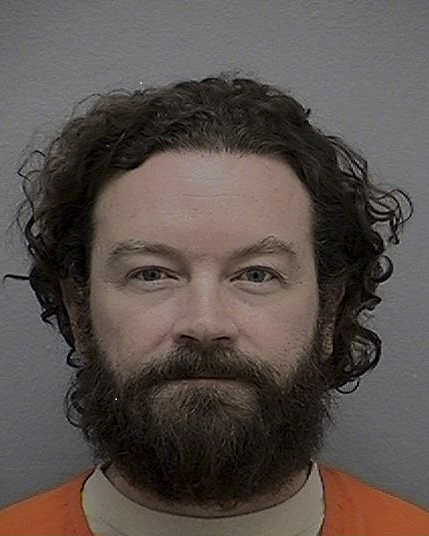
Masterson's 2023 mugshot

On June 17, 2020, Masterson was charged with raping a 23-year-old woman in 2001, a 28-year-old woman in early 2003, and a 23-year-old woman in late 2003. The three counts came after a three-year investigation beginning in 2017.

On January 21, 2021, Masterson pleaded not guilty. A four-day preliminary hearing began on May 18, 2021, where three women told how Church of Scientology employees tried to stop them from reporting Masterson to the police.

On May 21, 2021, Los Angeles County Superior Court judge Charlaine F. Olmedo ruled "all three witnesses to be credible and the evidence presented during a preliminary hearing sufficient to support the charges." She ordered that Masterson be bound over for trial on three counts of rape by force or fear and that he surrender his passport at his next arraignment, which was set for June 7, 2021. In the ruling, Judge Olmedo determined that the Scientology organization has "an expressly written doctrine" that "not only discourages, but prohibits" its members from going to the police to report illegal behavior.

On June 7, 2021, Masterson pleaded not guilty to rape accusations alleged to have occurred between 2001 and 2003. His defense attorney accused the three women of colluding against Masterson, claiming that they were in contact with each other. His defense attorney also stated that one of the Jane Does had obtained money from Masterson in 2004. After the June 7 arraignment, Masterson remained free on $3.3 million bail. A pretrial hearing was set for August 9, 2021.

During the pretrial hearing on August 9, 2021, Judge Olmedo rejected numerous subpoena requests from Masterson's defense attorneys, calling them "stunningly overbroad", including requests for LAPD records related to David Miscavige and Shelly Miscavige, a subpoena of the producers of the TV show Leah Remini: Scientology and the Aftermath, and a subpoena of an investigative reporter. The defense filed a motion to dismiss the case based on a lack of evidence presented during the May preliminary hearing, and Olmedo sent that motion to another judge. On November 10, 2021, Los Angeles County Judge Ronald S. Coen ruled that the testimony of the alleged victims was credible and sufficient to support the charges, setting trial for August 29, 2022 in Judge Olmedo's courtroom.

The August 29 trial date was subsequently rescheduled for October 11, 2022, at the request of Masterson's lawyers. Near the end of the month-long trial, Masterson decided not to testify nor call witnesses in his defense. Both parties rested their cases on November 14, 2022, and made their closing arguments the following day. The jury deadlocked after three days in deliberation; instead of declaring a mistrial, the judge ordered the jury to resume deliberations the week after Thanksgiving. The jury remained deadlocked once deliberations resumed; consequently, a mistrial was declared on November 30, 2022. The jury foreman said that the panel of six men and six women leaned towards acquitting Masterson on all counts because they found the testimonies of the complainants inconsistent and implausible; for instance, one Jane Doe testified in court that Masterson threatened her with a gun during the attack, but a firearm was not mentioned when she reported to the police: "The big big problem for her, credibility-wise, was the gun present in the testimony but not in the early reports", the jury foreman said.

=== Retrial ===
A new trial was held between April and May 2023, and on May 31, Masterson was convicted of two of the three counts of forcible rape. The jury was hung 8–4 in favor of conviction on the third charge. Masterson was remanded without bail until sentencing. He was incarcerated at Men's Central Jail in Los Angeles, in "administrative segregation" for his safety.

In July 2023, prosecutors announced that they would not retry Masterson on the charge which had resulted in a hung jury.

=== Sentencing ===
On September 7, 2023, Masterson was sentenced to the maximum allowed by law, "30 years to life in prison", and eligible for parole after serving 25 1/2 years. His lawyers have said they would appeal the conviction.

Masterson was admitted to North Kern State Prison on December 27, 2023, after months of post-sentencing hearings. He was subsequently moved to and now resides at California Men's Colony.

=== Appeal ===
In January 2024, a Los Angeles Superior Court judge denied bail for Masterson pending an appeal with worries Masterson could flee. "If defendant's conviction and sentence are upheld on appeal, he will likely remain in custody for decades and perhaps the rest of his life," wrote Judge Charlaine Olmedo. "In light of the fact that defendant has no wife to go home to, defendant now has every incentive to flee and little reason to return to state prison to serve out the remainder of his lengthy sentence should his appeal be unsuccessful," the judge added in reference to the ongoing divorce proceedings between Masterson and Bijou Phillips.

=== Interference by the Church of Scientology ===
After the criminal trial concluded, the victims' civil case resumed against Masterson and the Church of Scientology. Numerous instances of interference by the Church before, during and after the criminal trials were brought to light.

There were attempts to break in to the prosecutor's house and to run him off the road, his car windows were broken, electronics tampered with, and he was surveilled. When seeking co-counsel, the prosecutor warned of potential harassment, stalking or other retaliation. Two attorneys declined out of fear, before the prosecutor found co-counsel.

LAPD detectives on the case were stalked, surveilled and experienced harassment. In the middle of the criminal trial, the Church of Scientology's head of security and their attorney Vicki Podberesky met with the LAPD chief of police to accuse detectives and prosecutors of misconduct. They claimed to have "boxes" of evidence alleging "detectives and prosecutors on the case had falsified witness testimony, overstated or coached witness testimony and withheld evidence". Prosecutor Mueller said the visit impacted the case when one of the detectives was afraid to testify.

One of the sexual assault victims claimed various harassment including tampering with security systems, vandalizing a car, and attempting to run them off the road. Another victim reported being followed during the criminal trial.

On June 7, 2023, Judge Olmedo sanctioned Masterson's earlier defense attorneys Tom Mesereau and Sharon Appelbaum for leaking confidential discovery material from the criminal case to Vicki Podberesky, an attorney representing the Church of Scientology in the civil lawsuit. This leak was in direct violation of "repeated directives and orders to refrain from providing criminal discovery to litigants and attorneys in the civil case." The files contained confidential information regarding the victims, including addresses and other personal information. Podberesky then used the information to file complaints against the lead prosecutors in Masterson's rape trial, requested the police department start criminal inquiries into the two detectives who testified in the trial, and alleged that the Masterson victims filed false police reports.

== Filmography ==
=== Film ===
| Year | Title | Role | Notes |
|---|---|---|---|
| 1993 | Beethoven's 2nd | Seth | |
| 1995 | Bye Bye Love | Mikey | |
| 1997 | Face/Off | Karl | |
| 1997 | Trojan War | Seth | |
| 1997 | Star Kid | Kevin | |
| 1998 | Wild Horses | Danny | |
| 1998 | Too Pure | Tipper | |
| 1998 | The Faculty | "Fucked-up" kid | |
| 1999 | Dirt Merchant | Dirt Merchant | |
| 2000 | Dracula 2000 | Nightshade | |
| 2001 | Alex in Wonder | Patrick | |
| 2002 | Hip, Edgy, Sexy, Cool | | |
| 2002 | Comic Book Villains | Conan | |
| 2002 | Hold On | | |
| 2005 | Pancho's Pizza | | |
| 2006 | Puff, Puff, Pass | Larry | |
| 2007 | Smiley Face | Steve | |
| 2007 | You Are Here | Derek | |
| 2008 | Yes Man | Rooney | |
| 2008 | The Brooklyn Heist | Fitz | |
| 2009 | Wake | Shane | |
| 2009 | Made for Each Other | Morris "The Executioner" Rodriguez | |
| 2009 | The Bridge to Nowhere | Kevin | |
| 2012 | The Chicago 8 | Jerry Rubin | |
| 2012 | California Solo | Paul | |
| 2012 | Alter Egos | Jimmy | |
| 2012 | The Polterguys | Tim Burr | |
| 2015 | In Passing | Neighbor | Short film |
| 2016 | Hot Bot | Agent Koontz | |
| 2016 | Urge | Neal | |

=== Television ===
| Year | Title | Role | Notes |
|---|---|---|---|
| 1988 | Jake and the Fatman | Butch | Episode: "After You're Gone" |
| 1993 | Joe's Life | Leo Gennaro | 11 episodes |
| 1994 | Roseanne | Jimmy Phillips | 2 episodes |
| 1994–1997 | NYPD Blue | John | 2 episodes |
| 1995 | Extreme | Skeeter | 7 episodes |
| 1996 | American Gothic | Ray | Episode: "Rebirth" |
| 1996 | Seduced by Madness | Seth | Television film |
| 1996 | Tracey Takes On... | King the Dog | Episode: "Family" |
| 1996 | Party of Five | Matt | 3 episodes |
| 1996 | Her Last Chance | Ryan | Television film |
| 1996–1998 | Cybill | Justin Thorpe | 16 episodes |
| 1997 | Sliders | Renfield | Episode: "Stoker" |
| 1998–2006 | That '70s Show | Steven Hyde | Main cast; 200 episodes Nominated – Teen Choice Award for TV Choice Sidekick (2000); Nominated – Teen Choice Award for Best Performance in a TV Series by a Young Ensemble (shared with Topher Grace, Laura Prepon, Mila Kunis, Wilmer Valderrama, and Ashton Kutcher) (1999) |
| 2001 | Strange Frequency | Randy | Television film |
| 2001 | Grounded for Life | Vince | Episode: "Baby You Can't Drive My Car" |
| 2001 | How to Make a Monster | Jeremy | Uncredited; Television film |
| 2002–2004 | MADtv | Various | 2 episodes |
| 2003 | King of the Hill | Cory | Voice; Episode: "Megalo Dale" |
| 2003 | Robot Chicken | Various | Voice; 2 episodes |
| 2003 | Stephen King's Dead Zone | Dr. Alex Conners | Episode: "Vanguard" |
| 2005 | Entourage | Himself | Episode: "Aquamansion" |
| 2006 | Kim Possible | Quinn | Voice; Episode: "And the Mole-Rat Will Be CGI" |
| 2011 | Raising Hope | Lucy's Boyfriend | Episode: "Don't Vote for This Episode" |
| 2011 | White Collar | James Roland | Episode: "Where There's a Will" |
| 2012–2014 | Men at Work | Milo Foster | Main cast; 30 episodes |
| 2012 | Supah Ninjas | Limelight/ Lemuel Lightner | Episode: "Limelight" |
| 2013 | Haven | Anderson Harris | Episode: "Shot in the Dark" |
| 2014 | Royal Pains | David Van Dyke | Episode: "Ganging Up" |
| 2016–2018 | The Ranch | Jameson "Rooster" Bennett | Series regular; 50 episodes |
| 2016 | @midnight | Himself | Episode: "394" |
| 2016 | WWE Raw | Himself | October 3, guest with Ashton Kutcher |
| 2017 | Easy | Annie's Boyfriend | Episode: "Baby Steps" |

=== Music videos ===
| Year | Title | Artist | Role | Notes |
|---|---|---|---|---|
| 1999 | "That '70s Song (In the Street)" | Cheap Trick | Hyde | Along with Cast of That '70s Show |
| 1999 | "Feelin' Alright" | Len | Student | |
| 2011 | "The Way I Fiesta" (ft. Clayton Vice) | Eduardo Fresco | DJ | |

=== Producer ===
| Year | Title | Type | Notes |
|---|---|---|---|
| 2008 | The Brooklyn Heist | Film | Producer; Jury Award for Best Florida Comedy (shared with Dave Steck, Brett Halsey, Michael Cecchi, Julian Kheel) |
| 2014 | Men at Work | Television | Producer; 10 episodes |
| 2016–2018 | The Ranch | Television | Co-Executive Producer |
