= Lists of American sitcom episodes =

This is a list of lists of American sitcom episodes.

== 0–9 ==
- List of 2 Broke Girls episodes
- List of 3rd Rock from the Sun episodes
- List of 8 Simple Rules episodes
- List of 9 to 5 episodes
- List of 30 Rock episodes
- List of 100 Deeds for Eddie McDowd episodes
- List of 227 episodes

== A ==
- List of The Abbott and Costello Show episodes
- List of Abbott Elementary episodes
- List of About a Boy episodes
- List of According to Jim episodes
- List of The Addams Family episodes
- List of The Adventures of Ozzie and Harriet episodes
- List of The Adventures of Pete & Pete episodes
- List of ALF episodes
- List of Alice episodes
- List of All in the Family episodes
- List of All of Us episodes
- List of The Amazing World of Gumball episodes
- List of Amen episodes
- List of American Dad! episodes
- List of American Housewife episodes
- List of The Andy Griffith Show episodes
- List of Anger Management episodes
- List of Angie Tribeca episodes
- List of The Angry Beavers episodes
- List of Aqua Teen Hunger Force episodes
- List of Archer episodes
- List of Archie Bunker's Place episodes
- List of Are We There Yet? episodes
- List of Arliss episodes
- List of Arrested Development episodes
- List of As the Bell Rings (American TV series) episodes

== B ==
- List of Baby Daddy episodes
- List of Barney Miller episodes
- List of Beavis and Butt-Head episodes
- List of Becker episodes
- List of Benson episodes
- List of The Bernie Mac Show episodes
- List of The Beverly Hillbillies episodes
- List of Bewitched episodes
- List of The Big Bang Theory episodes
- List of Big Mouth episodes
- List of Big Time Rush episodes
- List of Black-ish episodes
- List of Blossom episodes
- List of Blue Mountain State episodes
- List of The Bob Cummings Show episodes
- List of Bob Hearts Abishola episodes
- List of The Bob Newhart Show episodes
- List of Bob's Burgers episodes
- List of BoJack Horseman episodes
- List of The Boondocks episodes
- List of Boy Meets World episodes
- List of The Brady Bunch episodes
- List of Brickleberry episodes
- List of Broad City episodes
- List of Brooklyn Nine-Nine episodes

== C ==
- List of California Dreams episodes
- List of Car 54, Where Are You? episodes
- List of The Carmichael Show episodes
- List of Caroline in the City episodes
- List of Charles in Charge episodes
- List of Cheers episodes
- List of Chico and the Man episodes
- List of Childrens Hospital episodes
- List of China, IL episodes
- List of Clarissa Explains It All episodes
- List of The Cleveland Show episodes
- List of Clueless episodes
- List of Coach episodes
- List of The Comeback episodes
- List of Community episodes
- List of The Conners episodes
- List of Cory in the House episodes
- List of The Cosby Show episodes
- List of Cosby episodes
- List of Cougar Town episodes
- List of The Courtship of Eddie's Father episodes
- List of Cousin Skeeter episodes
- List of Cow and Chicken episodes
- List of Crash & Bernstein episodes
- List of The Critic episodes
- List of Curb Your Enthusiasm episodes
- List of Cybill episodes

== D ==
- List of The Danny Thomas Show episodes
- List of Daria episodes
- List of Deadbeat episodes
- List of Dear John episodes
- List of December Bride episodes
- List of Dennis the Menace (1959 TV series) episodes
- List of Designing Women episodes
- List of Dharma & Greg episodes
- List of The Dick Van Dyke Show episodes
- List of Diff'rent Strokes episodes
- List of A Different World episodes
- List of Dinosaurs episodes
- List of Disenchantment episodes
- List of Doctor Doctor (American TV series) episodes
- List of The Donna Reed Show episodes
- List of Doogie Howser, M.D. episodes
- List of The Doris Day Show episodes
- List of Doug episodes
- List of Drake & Josh episodes
- List of Drawn Together episodes
- List of Dream On episodes
- List of The Drew Carey Show episodes
- List of Duckman episodes

== E ==
- List of Ellen episodes
- List of Empty Nest episodes
- List of Entourage episodes
- List of Episodes episodes
- List of Eve (American TV series) episodes
- List of Even Stevens episodes
- List of Evening Shade episodes
- List of Every Witch Way episodes
- List of Everybody Hates Chris episodes
- List of Everybody Loves Raymond episodes
- List of The Exes episodes

== F ==
- List of F Is for Family episodes
- List of F Troop episodes
- List of The Facts of Life episodes
- List of Family Affair episodes
- List of Family Guy episodes
- List of Family Matters episodes
- List of Family Ties episodes
- List of The First Family episodes
- List of Fish episodes
- List of The Flintstones episodes
- List of The Flying Nun episodes
- List of For Better or Worse (TV series) episodes
- List of Frasier episodes
- List of Fresh Off the Boat episodes
- List of The Fresh Prince of Bel-Air episodes
- List of Friends episodes
- List of Full House episodes
- List of Fuller House episodes
- List of Futurama episodes

== G ==
- List of The Game episodes
- List of Gary Unmarried episodes
- List of The George Burns and Gracie Allen Show episodes
- List of George Lopez episodes
- List of Get a Life episodes
- List of Get Smart episodes
- List of The Ghost & Mrs. Muir episodes
- List of Ghosts (American TV series) episodes
- List of Gilligan's Island episodes
- List of Gimme a Break! episodes
- List of Girlfriends episodes
- List of Girls episodes
- List of The Goldbergs episodes
- List of The Golden Girls episodes
- List of Gomer Pyle – USMC episodes
- List of Good Luck Charlie episodes
- List of The Good Place episodes
- List of Good Times episodes
- List of Goof Troop episodes
- List of Grace and Frankie episodes
- List of Grace Under Fire episodes
- List of The Great North episodes
- List of Green Acres episodes
- List of Grounded for Life episodes
- List of Growing Pains episodes
- List of Grown-ish episodes

== H ==
- List of Hang Time episodes
- List of Hangin' with Mr. Cooper episodes
- List of Hannah Montana episodes
- List of Happily Divorced episodes
- List of Happy Days episodes
- List of Happy Endings episodes
- List of Harvey Birdman, Attorney at Law episodes
- List of The Haunted Hathaways episodes
- List of Hazel episodes
- List of Head of the Class episodes
- List of Hello, Larry episodes
- List of Here's Lucy episodes
- List of Herman's Head episodes
- List of Hey Arnold! episodes
- List of The Hogan Family episodes
- List of Hogan's Heroes episodes
- List of Home Improvement episodes
- List of Home Movies episodes
- List of Honey, I Shrunk the Kids: The TV Show episodes
- List of The Honeymooners sketches
- List of Hope & Faith episodes
- List of Hot in Cleveland episodes
- List of House Calls episodes
- List of How I Met Your Mother episodes
- List of The Hughleys episodes

== I ==
- List of I Am Weasel episodes
- List of I Dream of Jeannie episodes
- List of I Love Lucy episodes
- List of I'm in the Band episodes
- List of iCarly episodes
- List of In the House episodes
- List of Instant Mom episodes
- List of It's a Living episodes
- List of It's Always Sunny in Philadelphia episodes
- List of It's Garry Shandling's Show episodes

== J ==
- List of The Jackie Gleason Show episodes
- List of The Jamie Foxx Show episodes
- List of The Jeffersons episodes
- List of The Jetsons episodes
- List of The Joey Bishop Show episodes
- List of Johnny Bravo episodes
- List of Jonas episodes
- List of Julia episodes
- List of Just Shoot Me! episodes
- List of Just the Ten of Us episodes

== K ==
- List of Kate & Allie episodes
- List of Kenan & Kel episodes
- List of The King of Queens episodes
- List of King of the Hill episodes
- List of Krapopolis episodes

== L ==
- List of The Larry Sanders Show episodes
- List of The Last Man on Earth episodes
- List of Last Man Standing episodes
- List of Laverne & Shirley episodes
- List of The League episodes
- List of Leave It to Beaver episodes
- List of Less Than Perfect episodes
- List of Let's Stay Together episodes
- List of Life in Pieces episodes
- List of Father Knows Best episodes
- List of Living Single episodes
- List of Lizzie McGuire episodes
- List of The Looney Tunes Show episodes
- List of Love & War episodes
- List of Love That Girl! episodes
- List of Love Thy Neighbor (American TV series) episodes
- List of Love, American Style episodes
- List of The Lucy Show episodes

== M ==
- List of Mad About You episodes
- List of Major Dad episodes
- List of Malcolm in the Middle episodes
- List of Mama's Family episodes
- List of Man with a Plan episodes
- List of The Many Loves of Dobie Gillis episodes
- List of Married... with Children episodes
- List of Martin episodes
- List of The Mary Tyler Moore Show episodes
- List of M*A*S*H episodes
- List of Maude episodes
- List of Mayberry R.F.D. episodes
- List of McHale's Navy episodes
- List of Meet the Browns episodes
- List of Melissa & Joey episodes
- List of Men at Work episodes
- List of The Middle episodes
- List of Mike & Molly episodes
- List of The Millers episodes
- List of The Mindy Project episodes
- List of Mr. Box Office episodes
- List of Mister Ed episodes
- List of Modern Family episodes
- List of Moesha episodes
- List of Mom episodes
- List of The Monkees episodes
- List of Moral Orel episodes
- List of Mork & Mindy episodes
- List of The Mothers-in-Law episodes
- List of Mr. Belvedere episodes
- List of Mr. Pickles episodes
- List of The Munsters episodes
- List of Murphy Brown episodes
- List of My Boys episodes
- List of My Name Is Earl episodes
- List of My Secret Identity episodes
- List of My Three Sons episodes
- List of My Two Dads episodes
- List of My Wife and Kids episodes

== N ==
- List of The Naked Brothers Band episodes
- List of The Naked Truth episodes
- List of The Nanny episodes
- List of Ned & Stacey episodes
- List of Ned's Declassified School Survival Guide episodes
- List of The Neighbors episodes
- List of The New Adventures of Old Christine episodes
- List of The New Dick Van Dyke Show episodes
- List of New Girl episodes
- List of Newhart episodes
- List of NewsRadio episodes
- List of Night Court episodes
- List of The Norm Show episodes
- List of Nurses episodes

== O ==
- List of The Odd Couple (1970 TV series) episodes
- List of The Odd Couple (2015 TV series) episodes
- List of Odd Mom Out episodes
- List of The Office (American TV series) episodes
- List of One Day at a Time (2017 TV series) episodes
- List of One Day at a Time (1975 TV series) episodes
- List of One on One episodes
- List of Our Cartoon President episodes
- List of Our Miss Brooks episodes

== P ==
- List of Pair of Kings episodes
- List of The Parent 'Hood episodes
- List of Parker Lewis Can't Lose episodes
- List of The Parkers episodes
- List of Parks and Recreation episodes
- List of The Partridge Family episodes
- List of The Patty Duke Show episodes
- List of Perfect Strangers episodes
- List of Petticoat Junction episodes
- List of The Phil Silvers Show episodes
- List of Phyllis episodes
- List of The PJs episodes
- List of Private Benjamin episodes
- List of Private Secretary episodes
- List of The Proud Family episodes
- List of Punky Brewster episodes

== R ==
- List of Raising Hope episodes
- List of The Ranch episodes
- List of Raven's Home episodes
- List of Reba episodes
- List of Reed Between the Lines episodes
- List of Regular Show episodes
- List of The Ren & Stimpy Show episodes
- List of Reno 911! episodes
- List of Rhoda episodes
- List of Rick and Morty episodes
- List of Roc episodes
- List of Rocko's Modern Life episodes
- List of Romeo! episodes
- List of Roseanne episodes
- List of Royal Crackers episodes
- List of Rude Awakening episodes
- List of Rules of Engagement episodes

== S ==
- List of Sabrina the Teenage Witch episodes
- List of Salute Your Shorts episodes
- List of Samantha Who? episodes
- List of Sanford and Son episodes
- List of Sanjay and Craig episodes
- List of The Sarah Silverman Program episodes
- List of Saved by the Bell episodes
- List of Saved by the Bell: The New Class episodes
- List of Scrubs episodes
- List of See Dad Run episodes
- List of Seinfeld episodes
- List of Sex and the City episodes
- List of Shake It Up episodes
- List of Silicon Valley episodes
- List of Silver Spoons episodes
- List of The Simpsons episodes
- List of The Simpsons episodes (season 21–present)
- List of The Simpsons episodes (seasons 1–20)
- List of Sister, Sister episodes
- List of Sledge Hammer! episodes
- List of Small Wonder episodes
- List of Smart Guy episodes
- List of Soap episodes
- List of Solar Opposites episodes
- List of Sonny with a Chance episodes
- List of The Soul Man episodes
- List of South Park episodes
- List of Speechless episodes
- List of Spin City episodes
- List of SpongeBob SquarePants episodes (seasons 1–10)
- List of SpongeBob SquarePants episodes (seasons 11–present)
- List of Squidbillies episodes
- List of Step by Step episodes
- List of The Steve Harvey Show episodes
- List of Still Standing episodes
- List of Strangers with Candy episodes
- List of Suburgatory episodes
- List of The Suite Life of Zack & Cody episodes
- List of The Suite Life on Deck episodes
- List of Sullivan & Son episodes
- List of SuperMansion episodes
- List of Superstore episodes
- List of Sweet Valley High episodes

== T ==
- List of Taxi episodes
- List of Teachers (2016 TV series) episodes
- List of Temperatures Rising episodes
- List of That '70s Show episodes
- List of That Girl episodes
- List of That's So Raven episodes
- List of The Neighborhood episodes
- List of Three's Company episodes
- List of 'Til Death episodes
- List of Titus episodes
- List of Too Close for Comfort episodes
- List of True Jackson, VP episodes
- List of Tuca & Bertie episodes
- List of Two and a Half Men episodes
- List of Two Guys and a Girl episodes

== U ==
- List of Ugly Americans episodes
- List of Unbreakable Kimmy Schmidt episodes
- List of Undateable episodes
- List of Unfabulous episodes
- List of Unhappily Ever After episodes
- List of USA High episodes

== V ==
- List of Veep episodes
- List of Victorious episodes

== W ==
- List of Wait Till Your Father Gets Home episodes
- List of The Wayans Bros. episodes
- List of We Bare Bears episodes
- List of Web Therapy episodes
- List of Webster episodes
- List of Weird Science episodes
- List of Welcome Back, Kotter episodes
- List of What I Like About You episodes
- List of What's Happening Now!! episodes
- List of What's Happening!! episodes
- List of Whitney episodes
- List of Who's the Boss? episodes
- List of Will & Grace episodes
- List of Wings episodes
- List of Wizards of Waverly Place episodes
- List of WKRP in Cincinnati episodes
- List of The Wonder Years episodes
- List of Workaholics episodes

== Y ==
- List of Yes, Dear episodes
- List of You're the Worst episodes
- List of Young & Hungry episodes
- List of Young Sheldon episodes

== Z ==
- List of Zeke and Luther episodes
- List of Zoey 101 episodes
