= Manson International =

American film production company/distributor

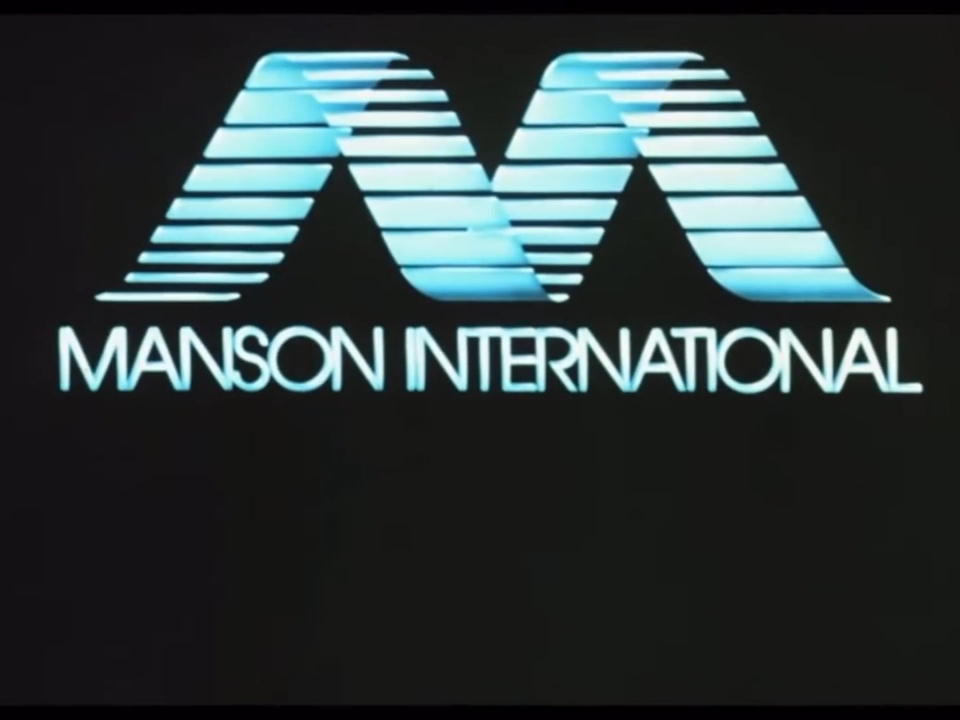
- Manson International Logo (1985 - 1990)
- Type: Private
- Industry: Film
- Founded: 1953; 73 years ago
- Founder: Edmund Goldman; Sam Nathanson
- Defunct: 1987; 39 years ago
- Fate: Sold to Management Company Entertainment Group
- Successor: Management Company Entertainment Group
- Headquarters: Los Angeles, California, United States
- Key people: Michael Goldman

Manson International was an independent American film production company and distributor. The name was derived from the founders' surnames. Initially a distributor of foreign films, it became one of the pioneer film sales agencies in the country.

== History ==
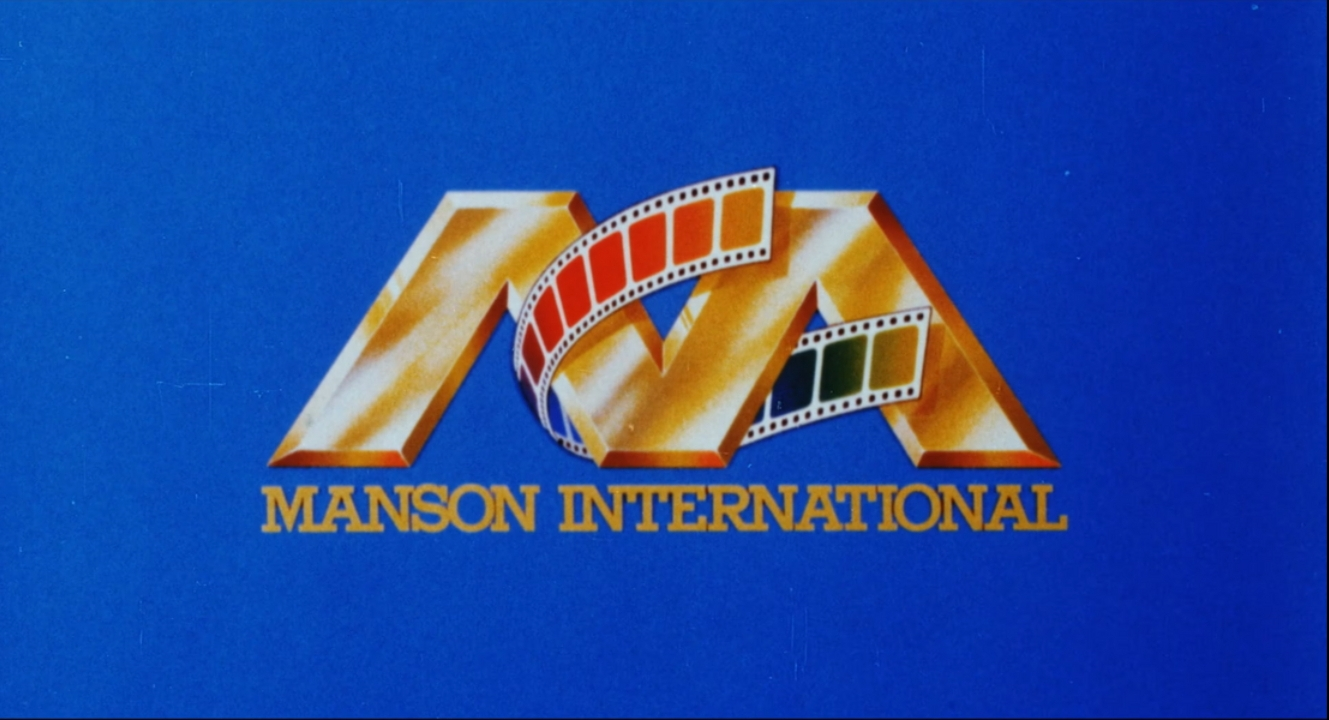
Manson International Logo (1970s - Early 1986)

Manson was founded in 1953 by former Columbia Pictures executive Edmund Goldman and Sam Nathanson as Manson Distributing Corporation. It initially focused on distributing foreign films in the United States. Among its films distributed was Godzilla. By the time it was incorporated in 1962, it began distributing primarily sex trip movies, where its features were marked as either "hard" or "soft". In 1975, Edmund's son Michael took over the company and shifted it into marketing and international licensing of independent films.

By the early 80s, Manson became Manson International and ventured into film production with Radioactive Dreams, as well as international TV distribution and arthouse pictures. At its peak, Manson International held the distribution rights to the libraries of Intercontinental Releasing Corporation.

In 1987, Manson was sold to Management Company Entertainment Group, a production company owned by Jonathan D. Krane. As a result, Intercontinental Releasing switched distribution to United Film Distribution Company. In 1995, MCEG and Orion Pictures merged to form Metromedia International Group. In 1997, Metro-Goldwyn-Mayer acquired Metromedia. MGM currently owns the Manson library, with certain exceptions. The aforementioned Intercontinental Releasing titles were acquired separately in November 16, 1994 by MCEG.

== List of films distributed outside North America ==
- Blood Feast (1963)
- Two Thousand Maniacs! (1964)
- Mission Batangas (1968)
- Nightmare in Wax (1969)
- Santa and the Three Bears (1970)
- Cycles South (1971)
- Terror at Red Wolf Inn (1972)
- The Trap on Cougar Mountain (1972)
- A Taste of Hell (1973)
- The Killing Kind (1973)
- Lemora (1973)
- Five Loose Women (1974)
- Gone in 60 Seconds (1974)
- Truck Stop Women (1974)
- Jessi's Girls (1975)
- The Love Butcher (1975)
- High Velocity (1976)
- Love at First Sight (1976)
- Snuff (1976)
- End of the World (1977)
- The Shadow of Chikara (1977)
- Starship Invasions (1977)
- Too Hot to Handle (1977)
- Auditions (1978)
- Autumn Born (1978)
- Blood & Guts (1978)
- Fairy Tales (1978)
- Laserblast (1978)
- Olly Olly Oxen Free (1978)
- The One Man Jury (1978)
- Summer Night Fever (1978)
- Tourist Trap (1978)
- Two Solitudes (1978)
- Triangle of Venus (1978)
- A Great Ride (1979)
- Fast Company (1979)
- The Day Time Ended (1979)
- The Glove (1979)
- H.O.T.S. (1979)
- Human Experiments (1979)
- Swim Team (1979)
- Young and Free (1979)
- The Attic (1980)
- Beautiful and Wild on Ibiza (1980)
- Deadly Companion (1980)
- Galaxina (1980)
- The Lucky Star (1980)
- Scream for Vengeance! (1980)
- Don't Go in the Woods (1981)
- Frightmare (1981)
- The Hot Touch (1981)
- Lunch Wagon (1981)
- Reborn (1981)
- Scanners (1981)
- Yesterday (1981)
- Trapped (1982)
- Murder by Phone (1982)
- Blood Link (1982)
- The Concrete Jungle (1982)
- Falcon's Gold (1982)
- The Grey Fox (1982)
- Liar's Moon (1982)
- Mother Lode (1982)
- Satan's Mistress (1982)
- Time Walker (1982)
- Tuxedo Warrior (1982)
- The Alchemist (1983)
- Chained Heat (1983)
- Eddie and the Cruisers (1983)
- Hostage (1983)
- Screamtime (1983)
- Self Defense (1983)
- Streamers (1983)
- Utilities (1983)
- Wavelength (1983)
- Hollywood Hot Tubs (1984)
- Jungle Warriors (1984)
- Melvin, Son of Alvin (1984)
- Octavia (1984)
- The Party Animal (1984)
- Savage Streets (1984)
- Street Hero (1984)
- Surf II (1984)
- Appointment with Fear (1985)
- Basic Training (1985)
- Certain Fury (1985)
- The Gig (1985)
- Hard Choices (1985)
- The Lost Empire (1985)
- Naked Vengeance (1985)
- Warriors of the Wind (1985)
- Ninja Turf (1985)
- Pink Nights (1985)
- Prime Risk (1985)
- Radioactive Dreams (1985)
- Rebel (1985)
- The Knight of the Dragon (1985)
- Stitches (1985)
- The Tape of Richard Beck (1985)
- Timerider: The Adventure of Lyle Swann (1985)
- Walls of Glass (1985)
- Billy Galvin (1986)
- Born American (1986)
- Body Count (1986)
- Cool Change (1986)
- Echo Park (1986)
- The Education of Allison Tate (1986)
- The Eleventh Commandment (1986)
- Free Ride (1986)
- Hollywood Vice Squad (1986)
- Hunter's Blood (1986)
- The Imagemaker (1986)
- The Ladies Club (1986)
- Land of Doom (1986)
- Meatballs III: Summer Job (1986)
- No Dead Heroes (1986)
- Shadows on the Wall (1986)
- Unmasking the Idol (1986)
- Weekend (1986)
- Willy/Milly (1986)
- Wired to Kill (1986)
- Anguish (1987)
- Dangerous Game (1987)
- Dark Eyes (1987)
- Happy Hour (1987)
- Howling III (1987)
- The Majorettes (1987)
- Miami Connection (1987)
- Off the Mark (1987)
- From a Whisper to a Scream (1987)
- The Order of the Black Eagle (1987)
- Overkill (1987)
- Rebel High (1987)
- R.O.T.O.R. (1987)
- Rolling Vengeance (1987)
- Scared Stiff (1987)
- Shades of Love: Champagne for Two (1987)
- Shades of Love: Make Mine Chartreuse (1987)
- Silent Night, Deadly Night Part 2 (1987)
- Slaughterhouse (1987)
- Stranded (1987)
- Summer Camp Nightmare (1987)
- Terror Squad (1987)
- Tigershark (1987)
- Treasure of the Moon Goddess (1987)
- The Video Dead (1987)
- Brain Damage (1988)
- Cheerleader Camp (1988)
- The Chocolate War (1988)
- Border Heat (1988)
- Diamond Run (1988)
- The Dreaming (1988)
- Fatal Pulse (1988)
- Hawks (1988)
- Qualcuno in ascalto (1988)
- In Dangerous Company (1988)
- Jakarta (1988)
- Java Burn (1988)
- Paratrooper (1988)
- The Perfect Match (1988)
- Scarecrows (1988)
- Sensations (1988)
- Twice Under (1988)
- World Gone Wild (1988)
- Roller Blade Warriors: Taken by Force (1989)
- Street Asylum (1990)
