= La Piscine =

La Piscine may refer to:

- La Piscine Museum in Roubaix
- La Piscine (film), 1969 film by Jacques Deray
- Service de documentation extérieure et de contre-espionnage, a former French intelligence agency from 1944 to 1982. It was nicknamed La Piscine as its headquarters in Paris was next to a public swimming pool
- Swimming Pool (2003 film), film by François Ozon

== See also ==
- Piscine (disambiguation)
- Piscina, shallow basin placed near the altar of a church
- Swimming pool (disambiguation)
