= I Am Curious =

I Am Curious may refer to:

== Films ==
- I Am Curious (Yellow), a 1967 Swedish avant-garde erotic drama film by Vilgot Sjöman, the first of a pair of companion films
- I Am Curious (Blue), a 1968 Swedish avant-garde erotic drama film by Vilgot Sjöman, the second of a pair of companion films
- I Am Curious Onion, a 1990 American film by Paul Yates

== Television series episodes ==
- "I Am Curious Cooper", an episode of The Mary Tyler Moore Show
- "I Am Curious Ed", an episode of Ed, Edd n Eddy
- "I Am Curious... Maddie", an episode of Moonlighting
- "I Am Curious, Melrose", an episode of Melrose Place
- "I Am Curious... Partridge", an episode of The Partridge Family

== Songs and albums ==
- "I Am Curious", a song from White Heat (Dusty Springfield album)
- I Am Kurious Oranj, an album by The Fall

== Other uses ==
- I Am Curious, Black, a comedy album by Redd Foxx
- The Superman's Girl Friend, Lois Lane issue "I Am Curious (Black)", wherein Lois Lane becomes a Black woman for a day to experience racism.

== See also ==
- "I Am Furious (Yellow)", a 2002 episode of The Simpsons
