= Perversions of Science =

American anthology television series

- Genre: Science fiction; Horror
- Based on: Weird Science by William Gaines
- Voices of: Maureen Teefy
- Theme music composer: Danny Elfman
- Composers: J. Peter Robinson; Ernest Troost; Frank Becker; Chris Boardman; Eric Colvin; Mark Mothersbaugh; Mark Snow; Dan Wool
- Country of origin: United States
- Original language: English
- No. of seasons: 1
- No. of episodes: 10

Production
- Executive producers: Richard Donner; David Giler; Walter Hill; Joel Silver; Robert Zemeckis
- Producer: Gilbert Adler
- Running time: 22 minutes (approx.)
- Production companies: EC Comics; HBO

Original release
- Network: HBO
- Release: June 7 – July 23, 1997

Related
- Tales from the Crypt

Perversions of Science is an American science fiction/horror anthology television series that ran from June 7 to July 23, 1997, on the premium cable channel HBO, lasting one season. It is a spin-off of the horror series Tales from the Crypt also shown on HBO, and its episodes are based on EC Comics's Weird Science, Weird Fantasy, and Incredible Science Fiction comic book series.

== Format ==
The format of Perversions of Science is similar to Tales from the Crypt; the latter is hosted by the Cryptkeeper, a wisecracking corpse performed by puppeteers, while Perversion of Science is hosted by a computer-generated female robot named Chrome (voiced by Maureen Teefy). Individual episodes begin with an introduction by Chrome, followed by a main narrative. After the narrative is complete, Chrome concludes the episode by making a comment about the story in question. Unlike the Cryptkeeper, who frequently makes puns revolving around death and macabre subjects, Chrome engages more in sexual innuendo.

Most episodes focused on a part of science fiction such as alien invasion or space/time travel.

The show featured a mix of established talent and young up-and-comers. For instance, "Panic" starred a young Jason Lee and Jamie Kennedy opposite Harvey Korman.

== Episodes ==
No. overall	No. in season	Title	Source	Directed by	Written by	Original release date
1	1	"Dream of Doom"	Weird Science #12 (1)	Walter Hill	David S. Goyer	June 7, 1997
A 40-year-old divorced but childless professor (Keith Carradine) cannot wake from his dreams. Each time he wakes up, he finds himself in another dream. Also starring Adam Arkin, Lolita Davidovich, and Gretchen Palmer.
2	2	"Anatomy Lesson"	Weird Fantasy #12 (As A Lesson in Anatomy!)	Gilbert Adler	Kevin Rock	June 7, 1997
The son (Jeremy London) of a small town coroner (Jim Metzler) has the desire to kill. A strange bearded man (Jeff Fahey) always interferes with his plans. Also starring Joanna Gleason and Devon Odessa.
3	3	"Boxed In"	Original Story	William Shatner	Chris Miller & Kevin Rock	June 7, 1997
A space pilot (Kevin Pollak) has spent years in an eroding fighter with a female android (Heather Elizabeth Parkhurst). He has kept his promise to be faithful to his fiancée named Dulcine (Melanie Shatner) who is also the daughter of an Admiral (William Shatner). When he finally gets to see her, he notices that the Admiral has fitted her with an electronic chastity belt.
4	4	"The Exile"	Weird Fantasy #14	William Malone	David J. Schow	June 11, 1997
A scientist (Jeffrey Combs) who kills people in his impurity-purging experiments is arrested and tried. When rehabilitation fails at the hands of the prison psychiatrist (David Warner), he is sentenced to be "exiled." Also starring Ron Perlman, Christopher John Fields, Brian Brophy, and Jeff Corey.
5	5	"Given the Heir"	Weird Science #16	Ramón Menéndez	Mark Verheiden	June 18, 1997
A woman (Yancy Butler) re-shapes her body to perfection. She then participates in an experiment where she is sent ten years into the past where she meets a man (William McNamara) obsessed with perfection. Also starring David Leisure and Paul Williams.
6	6	"Planely Possible"	Weird Fantasy #21	Russell Mulcahy	Peter Atkins	June 25, 1997
A grieving widower (George Newbern) volunteers to be the subject of an experiment by an ex-NASA scientist (Vincent Schiavelli) where he will be sent to another plane of existence where his murdered wife (Elizabeth Berkley) may still be alive. Also starring Joyce Brothers.
7	7	"Panic"	Weird Science #15 (4)	Tobe Hooper	Andrew Kevin Walker	July 2, 1997
In the 1930s, Bob (Jason Lee) and John (Jamie Kennedy) are among a number of people at a Halloween costume party trying to deal with the panic caused by a fictionalized version of the Orson Welles Mercury Theatre production of The War of the Worlds as people start turning up dead. Also starring Laraine Newman, Harvey Korman, Edie McClurg, and Chris Sarandon.
8	8	"Snap Ending"	Weird Science #18	Sean Astin	Kevin Rock	July 9, 1997
A spaceship captain (Jennifer Hetrick) and her mixed gender crew (Wil Wheaton, Sean Astin and Kathleen Wilhoite) struggle with anxiety when an unidentified extraterrestrial virus puts the ship in lockdown and activates the self-destruct sequence.
9	9	"Ultimate Weapon"	Incredible Science Fiction #32	Dean Lopata	Gilbert Adler & Jeannette Lewis	July 16, 1997
A shapeshifting alien from outer space assumes a human form (Paolo Seganti) in order to mate with a native earth-person (Heather Langenkamp) who is also dealing with her moody husband (Mitchell Whitfield), her drunk girlfriends (Kim Myers and Maria Chin), and her visiting parents (Jennifer Darling and Steve Kahan).
10	10	"The People's Choice"	Weird Science #16	Russell Mulcahy	Scott Nimerfro	July 23, 1997
In the near future, a suburban family (Patrick Cassidy and Maxine Bahns) gets caught between groups of warring robots. When one of their robots is damaged every night, a robot repairman suggests that they buy a new one: a red, white, and blue patriot. Also starring Barry Williams and Richard Riehle.

== Home media ==
The series was released in Japan (Region 2, NTSC) on March 23, 2001, across three individual DVD volumes by Pioneer Entertainment and Tohokushinsha Film.
