= Piscine =

Piscine: pertaining to fish.

- It is also a French noun meaning "swimming pool"; see La Piscine (disambiguation).
- The Latin word piscina (or sacrarium) denotes a shallow basin placed near the altar of a church.
- Localities
  - Piscina (TO), municipality in the Italian province of Turin
  - Piscinas, municipality in Sardinia

== See also ==
- Piscine Molitor
- The lengthened first name of the main character in either:
  - Life of Pi, or
  - Life of Pi (film)
