= Bernie Kahn =

American screenwriter (1930–2021)

- Born: Bernard M. Kahn; April 26, 1930; Brooklyn, New York
- Died: April 21, 2021 (aged 90); Woodland Hills, California
- Occupation: screenwriter
- Notable work: Basic Training, The Barefoot Executive
- Style: comedy film, sitcom
- Television: The Second Hundred Years, Bewitched, My Favorite Martian

Bernard M. Kahn (April 26, 1930 – April 21, 2021) was an American screenwriter.

== Education ==
He received bachelor's and master's degrees in English literature from the University of Michigan.

At the 1953 Maccabiah Games in Israel, in swimming he won a gold medal in the 100 m backstroke.

== Screenwriting career ==
He wrote for the sitcoms The Second Hundred Years, My Favorite Martian, and Bewitched, among others. Kahn also co-wrote the 1971 Disney television movie The Barefoot Executive with Joseph McEveety, Lila Garrett and Stu Billett, and wrote the screenplay for the 1985 comedy film Basic Training.

In 1972, his play Our Very Own Hole in the Ground was produced at La MaMa Experimental Theatre Club in the East Village, Manhattan, directed by Henry Hewes.

Kahn received the Writers Guild of America Award for Television: Episodic Comedy multiple times during the 1970s.

== Selected works ==
- The Smothers Brothers Show
- Occasional Wife (1966 television series)
- Bob & Carol & Ted & Alice (TV series)
- The Practice (1976 television series)
- The Paul Lynde Show
- Brothers and Sisters (1979 TV series)
- List of Bewitched episodes
- List of The Brady Bunch episodes
- List of Chico and the Man episodes
- List of The Courtship of Eddie's Father episodes
- List of Maude episodes
- List of The Partridge Family episodes
- List of Superboy episodes
- List of Three's Company episodes
