= Angela Aames =

American B-movie actress (1956–1988)

- Born: Lois Marie Tlustos; February 27, 1956; Pierre, South Dakota, U.S.
- Died: November 27, 1988 (aged 32); West Hills, Los Angeles, U.S.
- Other name: Angela Haugland
- Occupation: Actress
- Years active: 1978–1988
- Spouse: Mark Haughland (m. 1987)

Angela Aames (born Lois Marie Tlustos; February 27, 1956 – November 27, 1988) was an American actress known for her buxom blonde bombshell image.

== Career ==
Angela Aames's first film role was as Little Bo Peep in the adult film Fairy Tales (1978). The next year, she played Linda "Boom-Boom" Bangs in the movie H.O.T.S. (1979).

Her film roles included ...All the Marbles (1981), Scarface (1983), Bachelor Party (1984), Basic Training (1985), and Chopping Mall (1986). She did guest appearances on several television shows, including Cheers (1982), and Night Court (1984).

In 1983, she appeared on Cinemax's Likely Stories, playing an 80-foot-tall (24 m) giantess. She played a supporting role in the 1984 fantasy adventure The Lost Empire, directed by Jim Wynorski.

In the opening credits of Bachelor Party, Aames appears in a photography studio as a buxom mother having baby pictures taken with her child, along with the bachelors. She appeared in a recurring role as Penny, a fitness instructor, on The Dom DeLuise Show (1987).

== Personal life ==
Aames married Mark Haughland.

She was found dead at a friend's home in West Hills in the San Fernando Valley on November 27, 1988. The coroner ruled that her death was a result of a deterioration of the heart muscle, probably caused by a virus.

== Filmography ==
=== Movies ===
Year	Title	Role	Notes
1978	Fairy Tales	Little Bo Peep	
1979	H.O.T.S.	Boom-Boom Bangs	
1981	...All the Marbles	Louise, Girl in Harry's Room	
1982	Boxoffice	Starlet Suzi	
1983	Scarface	Woman at Babylon Club #1	
1984	The Lost Empire	Heather McClure	
1984	Bachelor Party	Mrs. Klupner	
1985	Basic Training	Cheryl	
1986	Chopping Mall	Miss Vanders	
1988	Flex		(final film role)

=== Television ===
Year	Title	Role	Notes
1979	Angie	Babs	Episode: "The Gambler"
1979 - 81	B. J. and the Bear	Honey / Charisse	5 episodes
1980	Mork & Mindy	Girl #1	Episode: "Mork's Vacation"
1980	The Comeback Kid	Sherry	TV movie
1980	This Year's Blonde	Blonde at Pool	TV movie
1981	The Perfect Woman		TV movie
1981	Hill Street Blues	Grieving Widow	Episode: "I Never Promised You a Rose, Marvin"
1981	Charlie and the Great Balloon Chase	Gangster's Moll (uncredited)	TV movie
1982	Cheers	Brandee	Episode: "Sam's Women"
1983	Likely Stories, Vol. 4	Mimi Vanderveen	TV movie
1983	The Love Boat	Laurie Jeffers	Episode: "Fountain of Youth/Bad Luck Cabin/Uncle Daddy"
1983	Automan	Bartender	Episode: "Staying Alive While Running a High Flashdance Fever"
1984	Alice	Tawney	Episode: "Romancing Mr. Stone"
1984 - 86	The Fall Guy	Louisa Duncan	2 episodes
1985	The Cracker Brothers		TV movie
1985	Brothers	Rita	Episode: "A Carnation by Any Other Name"
1985	Hardcastle and McCormick	The Girl	Episode: "Conventional Warfare"
1985 - 87	Night Court	Angela / Ursula / Debbie	4 episodes
1987	The Dom DeLuise Show	Penny	1 episode, #1.1
