= List of The Courtship of Eddie's Father episodes =

This is a list of episodes for the US television program The Courtship of Eddie's Father.

== Series overview ==
| Season | Episodes | Originally released | |
| Season | Episodes | First released | Last released |
|---|---|---|---|
| 1 | 26 | September 17, 1969 | March 11, 1970 |
| 2 | 24 | September 23, 1970 | March 24, 1971 |
| 3 | 23 | September 15, 1971 | March 1, 1972 |

== Episodes ==
=== Season 1 (1969–70) ===
| No. overall | No. in season | Title | Directed by | Written by | Original release date |
|---|---|---|---|---|---|
| 1 | 1 | "Mrs. Livingston, I Presume" | Alan Rafkin | James Komack & Richard M. Powell | September 17, 1969 |
Introduces characters. Eddie (Brandon Cruz), always "mother shopping", invites an aspiring actress (Victoria Vetri) to live with Tom (Bill Bixby), much to the chagrin of Mrs. Livingston (Miyoshi Umeki). Guest Stars: Lynn Fields as Heidi, Ann Marie as Hildy, Karin Wolfe as Etta.
| 2 | 2 | "Teacher's Pet" | James Komack | Carl Kleinschmitt | September 24, 1969 |
After Tom starts dating his first grade teacher, Eddie is teased by his classmates. Guest Stars: James Cole as Max Kelly, Ann Prentiss as Kerry Allen, Mitchell Sakamoto as Frank Komosori, Richard S. Steele as Dick (as Richard Steele).
| 3 | 3 | "And Eddie Makes Three" | Hal Cooper | Stan Cutler & Martin Donovan | October 1, 1969 |
Tom is considering marrying his most recent girlfriend, Lynn (Diana Muldaur), but Eddie does not care for her. After a day looking after an ailing Eddie, Lynn decides that she is not ready to be a mother.
| 4 | 4 | "The Littlest Kidnapper" | James Komack | Carl Kleinschmitt | October 8, 1969 |
Edide, concerned that Mrs. Livingston is lonely, coaxes a classmate (Mitchell Sakamoto) to come live with them, unbeknownst to his parents (Pat Morita and Miko Mayama). Guest Star: Bill Dana as Policeman.
| 5 | 5 | "The Computer" | Leslie H. Martinson | Story by : Rick Mittleman; Teleplay by : Rick Mittleman & Ken Pettus | October 15, 1969 |
Tom tries out a computer dating service for a magazine article. Subconsciously thinking of what is best for Eddie, he answers the dating questions in terms of who would be a good mother rather than a good wife. He is matched, incompatibly it turns out, to a woman (Sabrina Scharf) who similarly answers questions reflecting her desire to be a mother. After realizing that they had matched only to Eddie's desires to the exclusion of themselves, they part as friends.
| 6 | 6 | "Pain" | Jeffrey Hayden | Story by : James Komack & Bernie Kahn & Lila Garrett; Teleplay by : James Komack | October 22, 1969 |
Both Tom and Eddie are nervous about Eddie's first day at school. First Eddie runs away from school and then gets into a fight when a child laughs at him for not having a mother. Pretending to accede to Eddie's refusal to go back, Tom tutors Eddie at home in a most tedious manner. Once Eddie realizes that he will lose Mrs. Livingston since Tom, now a "full time tutor", can no longer make money, he enthusiastically returns to school. Guest Stars: Ron Ely as Ronald, Ann Marie as the camel riding model, Sally Ann Richards as Estelle Sherman, truant officer.
| 7 | 7 | "Guess Who's Coming for Lunch" | Ralph Senensky | James Komack | October 29, 1969 |
Eddie invites his new best friend (his dad is still his "best best friend"), Max (James Cole), to stay the weekend. At Eddies interest, Tom decides to invite Max's mother, Betty Kelly (Cicely Tyson), for dinner as a blind date. Tom doesn't know Betty is African-American, Betty doesn't know Tom is of Western European descent. After burning the Asian dinner Mrs. Livingston prepared, Betty said she prefers steak and insist to help (she says "It's lady's work"), and learn they share in common the loss of their spouses, though not for football (she likes, he doesn't). The boys decide they are best friends, and both of their parents are 'terrific'. The next morning, Tom is slightly taken aback when her son, at Eddie's suggestion, calls him "Uncle Tom", as this is how he refers to Norman.
| 8 | 8 | "Bully for You" | Ralph Senensky | Joanna Lee | November 5, 1969 |
After Eddie gets hit at school, once in the eye and another time knocking loose a tooth, it is revealed that the "Joey" striking him is a girl (6 year old Jodie Foster in one of her first roles). Concluding that this "tomboy" is rough around the edges, Tom enlists Mrs. Livingston's help because she is "smooth around the edges". She has Joey help make dinner "for the man". Why? "Because we woman are here to do it for them." Waiting on them "Japanese style", the two serve the food and will not eat until the men are done. Finally fed up after cake has been served and Eddie asks her for tea, she responds, "Your arms are not broken — pour it yourself!" and smacks him. Eddie, following Joey's father's (David Ketchum) advice, hits her back. And the tears begin to fall. Consequently she is now a "very sweet little girl". Back at school, Joey becomes so clingy that Eddies tells her to leave him alone which, again, causes her to cry. As a result, a fellow (male) classmate gives Eddie a black eye for making Joey cry. Tom explains that "love is a very tricky business". Guest Star: Arlen Stuart as Mrs. Stuart.
| 9 | 9 | "Gentleman Friend" | Ralph Senensky | Story by : James Komack & Irv Pearlberg; Teleplay by : Irv Pearlberg & Peggy Chantler Dick | November 12, 1969 |
Mrs. Livingston's "Gentleman Friend", Mr. Sato (George Takei), has asked her to marry. While Tom puts forward a brave front, Eddie takes the news with sadness. After learning that she will need to move to Japan, Mrs. Livingston calls off the wedding, saying, "Homesick is not the reason to get married." Guest Star: Claudia Bryar as Mrs. Thaler.
| 10 | 10 | "Any Friend of Dad's" | Hal Cooper | Stan Cutler & Martin Donovan | November 19, 1969 |
Harvey (Warren Berlinger), an old college acquaintance, comes to visit. Tom, not remembering Harvey as a close friend, starts to feel put out after he overstays his welcome. In the end, Harvey is very grateful and the sentiment makes Tom feel good about his generosity. In parallel, Eddie is also struggling with his friend sharing all of his toys. Guest Stars: Jean Marie Ingels as Doreen and Linda Meiklejohn as Jeri, the two "not the mother type" dates of Harvey and Tom.
| 11 | 11 | "An F for Mrs. Livingston" | Ralph Senensky | Stan Cutler & Martin Donovan | November 26, 1969 |
Mrs. Livingston is upset she flunked her English final exam, believing that she "brought disgrace on the family". After Eddie's friend (LoLo Cannon) suggests Mrs. Livingston may commit hara-kiri, he shadows her around the house while a foreboding thunderstorm roars outside. Mrs. Livingston calms Eddie by telling him the Japanese haven't done that for years and that woman never did. She ends up taking a makeup test and passes to everybody's relief. According to the director, Ralph Senensky, "Mrs. Livingstone’s flunking her exam was a Hitchcock MacGuffin to get us into the main story — of what occurs when a seven year old boy’s imagination encounters a frightening circumstance." Guest Star: Bruce Kirby as Harry.
| 12 | 12 | "Member of the Wedding" | Hal Cooper | Peggy Chantler Dick | December 3, 1969 |
Tina decides that she wants to marry Norman, who, after initially resisting, decides it would be a great idea. Tom later reminisces about asking Eddie's mom to marry. Inspired, Eddie explains to Norman and Tina that their marriage would be different from his parents: the former plans to go to the disco every night as a married couple, the latter settled down and had Eddie. Echoing the expression, "Out of the Mouths of babes", the bride and groom-to-be realize that their motivation, to avoid loneliness, is not an adequate reason to marry. Amusingly, they call off the wedding but decide there is no reason to cancel the wedding reception.
| 13 | 13 | "A Night Out for the Boys" | Hal Cooper | Stan Cutler & Martin Donovan | December 10, 1969 |
Tom and Eddie go on a camping trip with Dr. Bob Lockwood (Jonathan Daly) and his son (Danny Lockwood). Tension between the two dads arise due to their differing viewpoints on camping: Bob sees it as a character building exercise, particularly from a military perspective, whereas Tom sees it as a chance to have fun with Eddie. After Tom and the two boys get lost (and quickly regain their bearings), Bob chastises them for not following proper protocol. In the end, Bob loosens up after realizing that his relationship with his son would improve if they become more of a father and son rather than an army captain and recruit.
| 14 | 14 | "Mother of the Year" | Hal Cooper | Peggy Chantler Dick | December 17, 1969 |
Eddie's teacher, Miss Lister (Pamela Peadon), is pregnant (she is married but uses her maiden name as her "teacher name") and the students' mothers are having a surprise party for her. After Eddie wishes he had a mother that could participate, Tom offers his help. But he is told the "party is for ladies" only. Nonetheless he offers to make finger tip sandwiches, and though the "ladies" doubt that a man could make food, they relent. Tom struggles with the task but after a swig of bourbon he decides that the best food for a room full of children is one that Eddie would make: peanut butter, pickle & jelly bean finger sandwiches, etc. The mothers are horrified but the kids love it and Miss Lister gives Tom her plaque that reads, "Mother of the Year". Guest Stars: James Cole as Max Kelly, Gwynne Gilford as Mrs. Baldassare, Tani Guthrie as Barbara Harris (as Tani Phelps), Diana Hale as Mrs. Basimson, Mitchell Sakamoto as Frank Komosori, Bret Swanson as Dick.
| 15 | 15 | "Who Pulled the Blues Right Out of the Horn" | James Komack | Ken Pettus | December 24, 1969 |
Eddie's Aunt Kate (Francine York), his mom's sister, is in town visiting. At first, Tom is hesitant to have them meet as Kate used to look exactly like Eddie's mom. He believes that Eddie's memory of the loss of his mom is so fresh that he wants to shelter him from a painful reminder. But Eddie senses that Tom is hiding something from him and they have promised never to keep secrets from each other. After Mrs. Livingston insightfully asks Tom is he isn't protecting himself as much as Eddie, Tom relents. Kate is quite different from how Tom remembers – a member of the jet set, flighty and overbearing. She spends a day with Eddie, gambling, attending a cocktail party, bringing Eddie home decked out in a Nehru jacket and love beads flashing a peace sign (the show's perspective of a hippie) even encouraging him to tell a white lie about Norman. Tom feels that Kate is a bad influence and asks her to no longer be a part of Eddie's life. However, after seeing that Kate, though different, has a piece of Eddie's mom in her, and seeing that Eddie doesn't confuse Kate with his mother, he welcomes her into the family. Guest Star: Karin Wolfe as Etta.
| 16 | 16 | "The Library Card" | Ralph Senensky | Pauline Stone & Michael Cosgrove | December 31, 1969 |
After Tom receives a letter from Eddie's teacher that he isn't living up to his reading potential, Tom concludes that reading two books every Saturday to Eddie has taken away his initiative to read. So Eddie gets his first library card. His first book is Little Red Riding Hood. Later, he can't find the book and his neighbor friend (Lisa Gerritsen) tells him that he could go to jail for the infraction and should turn himself in to the police. Eddie, worried, does just that. The police officer (Thomas J. Hawkins) brings Eddie back home and Tom chastises him for not taking care of the book and not discussing his problem with him, which Eddie had tried to do but Tom was in a rush. It ends up that Tom himself had stuck the book into his briefcase and all is forgiven.
| 17 | 17 | "How Do You Know If It's Really Love?" | James Komack | Peggy Chantler Dick | January 7, 1970 |
Eddie struggles with the emotional pangs of first love for his much taller neighbor Elsie (Gabie Grammer). He suspects she likes him because she borrowed his sneakers as a good luck charm. He invites her over to his birthday party but is nervous that his "better looking" friend Richard Katkov (Larry Renda) will snatch Elsie away. At first relieved that Richard is bringing a date himself, Eddie is instantly attracted to the brown-haired, more height-appropriate girl, Margaret (Lori Specter), even giving her a braid found in the piñata booty. All of this attention is hurting Elsie's feelings. Eddie resolves the dilemma by sticking by Elsie which shows to Tom that he is learning responsibility. He understands from Mrs. Livingston's haiku that Margaret is unattainable while Elsie is "touchable". "It's really love if she doesn't have real long brown hair or anything 'cept you still think she's real neat." Guest Stars: James Cole as Max Kelly, Erin Moran as Emily Ruth Gustafson (the "shover"), Mitchell Sakamoto as Frank Komosori, Richard S. Steele as Dick (as Richard Steele).
| 18 | 18 | "The Road to You Know Where Is Paved with You Know What" | Ralph Senensky | Blanche Hanalis | January 14, 1970 |
Eddie and his father enjoy spending their Sundays together. Until, that is, a new "meddlesome busybody" neighbor, Miss Bristol (Ruth McDevitt), moves in. A retired teacher, Miss Bristol lectures separately both father and son that it isn't healthy to spend so much time together. So Eddie invents a friend he wants to play with on Sunday while Tom invents a girlfriend for his Sundays. Both spend their time idly apart, Tom at his office and Eddie moping around outside his apartment building. Eventually Tom guesses that Eddie is spending his Sundays alone and Eddie confesses. Eddie, consoling the mistaken Miss Bristol, said "You didn't meddle. You just didn't know what you were talking about."
| 19 | 19 | "They're Either Too Young or Too Old" | Ralph Senensky | Bob Rodgers | January 21, 1970 |
Guest Stars: Sherry Lynn Diamant as Glori.
| 20 | 20 | "The Mod Couple" | Ralph Senensky | Peggy Chantler Dick | January 28, 1970 |
Guest Stars: Sherry Lynn Diamant as Glori.
| 21 | 21 | "Guardian for Eddie" | Gary Nelson | Peggy Chantler Dick | February 4, 1970 |
Guest Star: Martha Scott as Grandmother.
| 22 | 22 | "The Promise" | Ralph Senensky | Bob Roberts & Peggy Chantler Dick & James Komack | February 11, 1970 |
Guest Star: Meg Wyllie as Miss Harriet Ritter.
| 23 | 23 | "A Five-Pound Monkey on His Stomach" | Hal Cooper | Stan Cutler & Martin Donovan | February 18, 1970 |
| 24 | 24 | "Free Is a Four Letter Word" | Hal Cooper | Peggy Chantler Dick | February 25, 1970 |
Guest Star: Tippi Hedren as Cissy Drummond-Randolph.
| 25 | 25 | "Don't Look Now, But Your Scorpio's Rising" | Hal Cooper | Joanna Lee | March 4, 1970 |
Guest Star: Yvonne Craig as Maryanne Atwater.
| 26 | 26 | "Money Is a Five Letter Word" | Hal Cooper | Peggy Chantler Dick | March 11, 1970 |

=== Season 2 (1970–71) ===
| No. overall | No. in season | Title | Directed by | Written by | Original release date |
|---|---|---|---|---|---|
| 27 | 1 | "The Unbirthday Present" | Hal Cooper | Stan Cutler & Martin Donovan | September 23, 1970 |
| 28 | 2 | "A Loaf of Bread, a Bar of Soap and a Jar of Peanut Butter" | Hal Cooper | Peggy Chantler Dick | September 30, 1970 |
Guest Stars: Jodie Foster as Joey Kelly, David Ketchum as Joe Kelly (as Dave Ketchum).
| 29 | 3 | "The Important Word Is 'And'" | Bob Sweeney | Stan Cutler & Martin Donovan | October 7, 1970 |
Guest Stars: Jonathan Daly as Dr. Bob Lockwood, Teddy Quinn as Danny Lockwood.
| 30 | 4 | "I Thought, You Thought" | Hal Cooper | Stan Cutler & Martin Donovan | October 14, 1970 |
| 31 | 5 | "The Business Trip" | Hal Cooper | Bob Rodgers | October 21, 1970 |
| 32 | 6 | "Eddie's Will" | Luther James | Story by : Jay Simms & Peggy Chantler Dick; Teleplay by : Peggy Chantler Dick | October 28, 1970 |
| 33 | 7 | "Hello, Miss Bessinger, Goodbye" | Bob Sweeney | Joanna Lee | November 4, 1970 |
Guest Stars: Natalie Masters as Mrs. Goldrich, Patrick O'Moore as Senator Goldrich, Suzanne Pleshette as Valerie Bessinger.
| 34 | 8 | "Love Is for Sharing" | Sid McCoy | Shirley Gordon | November 11, 1970 |
Guest Star: Lee Joe Casey as Bobby Brownbear (as Lee Joseph Casey).
| 35 | 9 | "Who Wants to Sail Down the Amazon, Anyway?" | Don Weis | Peggy Chantler Dick & Joanna Lee | November 18, 1970 |
Guest Star: Will Geer as Harry I. Madison.
| 36 | 10 | "When the Shoe Is on the Other Foot, It Doesn't Fit" | Don Weis | Stan Cutler & Martin Donovan | November 25, 1970 |
Guest Star: Lori Saunders as Cynthia Kurland.
| 37 | 11 | "The Secret Box" | Jerrold Bernstein | Shirley Gordon | December 2, 1970 |
Guest Star: Gabie Grammer as Elsie.
| 38 | 12 | "Fear Is for Understanding" | Randall Hood | Shirley Gordon | December 16, 1970 |
| 39 | 13 | "Gifts Are for Giving" | Bill Bixby | Shirley Gordon | December 23, 1970 |
Guest Stars: Jodie Foster as Joey Kelly, David Ketchum as Joe Kelly (as Dave Ketchum).
| 40 | 14 | "A Little Get Together for Cissy" | Harry Falk | Stan Cutler & Martin Donovan | January 6, 1971 |
Guest Stars: Tippi Hedren as Cissy Drummond-Randolph, John Fiedler as The Mild Man, Ivor Barry as The Englishman, Dennis Fimple as man at party talking to The Englishman (uncredited).
| 41 | 15 | "The Ghetto Girl" | Gary Nelson | Alan J. Levitt | January 13, 1971 |
Guest Star: Amanda Lynne as Angustia 'Gus' Ferrero.
| 42 | 16 | "The Hospital" | Hal Cooper | Stan Cutler & Martin Donovan | January 20, 1971 |
Guest Stars: Andrew Prine as Dr. Hal 'Speed' Gould, Barbara Clarke Chisolm as Female Technician (as Barbara Clarke Chisholm), Catherine Ferrar as Miss Fern.
| 43 | 17 | "The Rift" | Hal Cooper | Peggy Chantler Dick | January 27, 1971 |
| 44 | 18 | "The Encounter Group" | Hal Cooper | Joanna Lee | February 3, 1971 |
Guest Stars: Guest Stars: Pat Delaney as Harriet, Rosemary Edelman as Carol Fleischman, Lew Horn as Bob Fleischman, Ed Hall as Ted Wilson.
| 45 | 19 | "Dear Mr. Cooper aka Eddie Meets an Astronaut" | Hal Cooper | Shirley Gordon & Mark Saha | February 10, 1971 |
Guest Stars: American astronaut Gordon Cooper as himself, Bill Fiore as Mr. Weston.
| 46 | 20 | "The Lonely Weekend" | Harry Falk | Stan Cutler & Martin Donovan | February 17, 1971 |
Guest Stars: Guest Stars: Brenda Benet as Brenda, Jodie Foster as Joey Kelly, Claire Brennen as Sherry Barnes, Robert Burton as Brian Frisbee (as Skip Burton).
| 47 | 21 | "The Magic Mrs. Rickles" | Harry Falk | Joanna Lee | March 3, 1971 |
Guest Stars: Lisa Kirk as Mrs. Rickles, Jodie Foster as Joey Kelly, Chris Woodley as Miss Huffman.
| 48 | 22 | "To Catch a Thief" | Hal Cooper | Susan Harris | March 10, 1971 |
Guest Stars: Willie Aames as Scott, Vincent Van Patten as Mark.
| 49 | 23 | "Everybody Needs a Brother" | Hal Cooper | Blanche Hanalis | March 17, 1971 |
Guest Stars: Mark Antony Van der Nagel as Jerry Riley, Brandon Williams as Steve Riley, Jeff Williams as Mike Riley, Tiger Williams as Lester Riley.
| 50 | 24 | "Discipline Is a Four Letter Word Spelled Love" | Terry Becker | Blanche Hanalis | March 24, 1971 |

=== Season 3 (1971–72) ===
| No. overall | No. in season | Title | Directed by | Written by | Original release date |
|---|---|---|---|---|---|
| 51 | 1 | "My Son, the Artist" | Don Weis | Stan Cutler & Martin Donovan | September 15, 1971 |
Angus Duncan as John Buckner, Patti Cohoon as Gretchen Buckner.
| 52 | 2 | "The Candidate" | Hal Cooper | Alan J. Levitt | September 22, 1971 |
Guest Stars: Kirk Mee as Mr. Taggart, Virginia Hawkins as Mrs. Kensington, Allen Joseph as Mr. Wertz.
| 53 | 3 | "Getting Back on the Horse" | Harry Falk | Bob Rodgers | September 29, 1971 |
Guest Stars: Richard X. Slattery as Xander Malloy, Robbie MacDonald as Claude.
| 54 | 4 | "Tell It Like I'm Telling You It Is" | Hal Cooper | Stan Cutler & Martin Donovan | October 6, 1971 |
Guest Stars: Lou Jacobi as Frank Hausman, Alan Oppenheimer as Sy Freeman, Frank Corsentino as Marvin Flair.
| 55 | 5 | "A Very Different Drummer" | Harry Falk | Stan Cutler & Martin Donovan | October 13, 1971 |
Guest Star: Ned York as Alex.
| 56 | 6 | "The Bicycle Theft" | Hal Cooper | Martin Ragaway | October 20, 1971 |
Guest Star: Bruce Kirby as Officer Gifford.
| 57 | 7 | "Two's Company" | Bill Bixby | Shirley Gordon | October 27, 1971 |
Guest Star: Madlyn Rhue as Dolores Carew .
| 58 | 8 | "Happy Birthday to You" | Bill Bixby | Stan Cutler & Martin Donovan | November 3, 1971 |
Guest Star: Ned York as Alex.
| 59 | 9 | "Or Else" | Herbert Franklin Solow | Stan Cutler & Martin Donovan | November 10, 1971 |
Guest Star:
| 60 | 10 | "Thy Neighbor Loves Thee" | Harry Falk | Stan Cutler & Martin Donovan | November 17, 1971 |
Guest Stars: Jerry Stiller and Anne Meara as Paul and Bunny Sterling, Allan Drake as Prescott.
| 61 | 11 | "A Little Red" | James Komack | Stan Cutler & Martin Donovan | December 1, 1971 |
Guest Star: Carol Lawrence as Irena Kosnova.
| 62 | 12 | "A Brave at Natchanoomi" | Bill Bixby | Stan Cutler & Martin Donovan | December 8, 1971 |
Guest Stars: Vic Tayback as Bernie, Brett Swanson as Herman, R.J. O'Hara as Herman's Father.
| 63 | 13 | "The Blarney Stone" | Harry Falk | Joanna Lee | December 15, 1971 |
Guest Star: Sally Struthers as Katie O'Hara.
| 64 | 14 | "Prince Charming" | Hal Cooper | Stan Cutler & Martin Donovan | December 29, 1971 |
Guest Stars: Geoffrey Thorpe as Harold, Joey Douglas as Paul, Linda Marie as Debbie, Gabie Grammer as Elsie, Heather Harrison as Sandra, James Cole as Max Kelly, Mitchell Sakamoto as Frank Komosori, Aldine King as Mrs. Pick.
| 65 | 15 | "The Choice" | Hal Cooper | Stan Cutler & Martin Donovan | January 5, 1972 |
Guest Stars: Carmelita Mann as Mrs. Cherry, Trisha Noble as Dr. Liz Park.
| 66 | 16 | "The Karate Story" | Bill Bixby | Martin Ragaway | January 12, 1972 |
Guest Stars: Willie Aames as Harold O'Brien, Hal Baylor as Mr. O'Brien, James Cole as Max Kelly, Joey Douglas as Jay, Ed Parker as himself, Bill M. Ryusaki as Bill – Karate Instructor (as Bill Ryusaki), Mitchell Sakamoto as Frank Komosori.
| 67 | 17 | "Very Young Man with a Horn" | Hal Cooper | Stan Cutler & Martin Donovan | January 19, 1972 |
Guest Stars: Ivor Barry as Major Pritchett, Larry Delaney as Mr. Lindley (as Laurence Delaney), Allan Drake as Mr. Prescott, Eve McVeagh as Lorraine Karn, Alan Oppenheimer as Sy Freeman.
| 68 | 18 | "The Investors" | Bill Bixby | Stan Cutler & Martin Donovan | January 26, 1972 |
Guest Stars: Hal Cooper as Gus, Martha Salcido as Hostess (as Marta Salcido), Janene Forsyth as herself.
| 69 | 19 | "It's All Write with Me" | Gary Nelson | Alan J. Levitt | February 2, 1972 |
Guest Star: Pat Harrington, Jr. as Peter Stowe.
| 70 | 20 | "A Little Help from My Friend" | Hal Cooper | Stan Cutler & Martin Donovan | February 9, 1972 |
Guest Star: Sammy Davis, Jr. as Rodney River Jr.
| 71 | 21 | "In the Eye of the Beholder" | Bill Bixby | Stan Cutler & Martin Donovan | February 16, 1972 |
Guest Stars: William Lanteau as Vincent Pryor, Lou Cutell as Samson, Willie Aames as Harold O'Brien, James Cole as Ralphie, Mitchell Sakamoto as Frank Komosori, Suzanne Taylor as Miss Silo (as Sue Taylor).
| 72 | 22 | "Time for a Change" | Bill Bixby | Stan Cutler & Martin Donovan | February 23, 1972 |
Guest Stars: Willie Aames as Harold O'Brien, Barbara Cason as Irma Handily, Michael Link as Bruce, Michael Morgan as Steve.
| 73 | 23 | "We Love Annie" | James Komack | James Komack | March 1, 1972 |
Guest Stars: Anne Meara as Annie Dempsey, Jerry Stiller as Mr. Landon, Yvonne Wilder as Kathy, John Breckfield as Jeff (as Jon Breakfield).
