= Robert Harris (English actor) =

British actor (1900–1995)

- Photo by Anthony Buckley, 1959
- Born: 28 March 1900; Weston-super-Mare, England
- Died: 18 May 1995 (aged 95); Hillingdon, England
- Occupation: Actor
- Years active: 1930-1982

Robert Harris (28 March 1900 – 18 May 1995) was a British actor. He graduated from Royal Academy of Dramatic Art in 1925, and his stage work included seasons at Stratford, the Old Vic, and on Broadway as Marchbanks in Bernard Shaw's Candida in 1937, opposite Katharine Cornell; He also appeared in more than sixty films from 1930 to 1982.

He was the castaway on Desert Island Discs on 10 February 1955.

== Filmography ==
Year	Title	Role	Notes
1930	The W Plan	Subaltern	
1943	The Life and Death of Colonel Blimp	Embassy Secretary	
1949	The Bad Lord Byron	Dallas	
1949	For Them That Trespass	Defense Counsel Sir Huntley	
1951	In Time of Pestilence	Narrator	Voice
1953	Laughing Anne	Joseph Conrad	
1955	That Lady	Cardinal	
1957	Seven Waves Away	Arthur J. Middleton	
1957	The Fuzzy Pink Nightgown	Barney Baylies	
1960	Oscar Wilde	Justice Richard Henn Collins - First Trial	
1963	Girl in the Headlines	William Lamotte	
1968	Decline and Fall... of a Birdwatcher	Prendergast	
1972	Young Winston	Speaker Gully	
1973	Lady Caroline Lamb	Apothecary	
1973	Massacre in Rome	Father Pancrazio	
1974	Ransom		
1975	Love Among the Ruins	Palmer	
1978	Fairy Tales	Dr. Ears	
