= Gilbert Adler =

American film producer

Gilbert Adler (born in New York City, February 14, 1946) is an American film producer who has collaborated with several notable filmmakers including Richard Donner, Brian De Palma, Walter Hill, Todd Phillips, and Bryan Singer.

In 1999, Adler—along with Robert Zemeckis and Joel Silver—formed Dark Castle Entertainment, a film production label formerly affiliated with Warner Bros.

== Career ==
Adler's career spans several decades, film genres, and jobs. He began as a producer and helped shepherd Brian De Palma's low-budget family comedy feature Home Movies to the screen. The next few years weren't particularly auspicious; Adler continued working in the modest-budget sphere. In 1985 he produced the Stephen Gyllenhaal thriller Certain Fury, and the military comedy Basic Training. Over the next decade Adler found more work as he branched out into other film jobs and also found work in TV. For example, in addition to producing over 40 episodes of the horror anthology Freddy's Nightmares (1998), he directed one and wrote four of the episodes. He repeated this trifecta soon afterwards in a new job, the similar Tales From the Crypt (1991). In 1998, Adler directed one episode of the teen witch series Charmed, and for the re-imagining of the tropics-set drama Fantasy Island. It is in movies that Alder generally has concentrated his efforts, however. Working often, he's received producer credit on a raft of features, including the '06 superhero reboot "Superman Returns" and "Valkyrie," a biopic about would-be Hitler assassin Colonel Claus von Stauffenberg, starring Tom Cruise.

== Filmography ==
He was a producer in all films unless otherwise noted.

=== Film ===
Year	Film	Credit
1979	Home Movies	
1985	Certain Fury	
1985	Basic Training	
1995	Demon Knight	
1996	Bordello of Blood	
1997	Double Tap	
1999	House on Haunted Hill	
2001	Thirteen Ghosts	
2002	Ghost Ship	
2004	Starsky & Hutch	Executive producer
2005	Constantine	Executive producer
2006	Superman Returns	
2008	Valkyrie	
2010	Dylan Dog: Dead of Night	
2018	Evil Nature	Executive producer
2021	Buckley's Chance	
TBA	Mirkwood	Executive producer
TBA	Untitled Joe Louis Project	

As writer

Year	Film
1992	Children of the Corn II: The Final Sacrifice
1996	Bordello of Blood

As director

Year	Film
1996	Bordello of Blood

As an actor

Year	Film	Role
1985	Basic Training	Security Guard

=== Television ===
Year	Title	Credit	Notes
1987	The Hitchhiker		
1988−90	Freddy's Nightmares		
1990	Hollywood Dog		Television film
1995	W.E.I.R.D. World	Co-executive producer	Television film
1991−96	Tales from the Crypt		
1997	Perversions of Science		
1999−2000	The Strip	Co-executive producer	
2014	Intelligence		
2019	Then Again with Herbie J Pilato	Executive producer	
TBA	The 'E' Division	Executive producer	

As writer

Year	Title	Notes
1988−90	Freddy's Nightmares	
1991	Haunted Lives: True Ghost Stories	
1995	W.E.I.R.D. World	Television film
1991−96	Tales from the Crypt	
1997	Perversions of Science	

As director

Year	Title
1990	Freddy's Nightmares
1992−93	Tales from the Crypt
1997	Perversions of Science
1998	Fantasy Island
1998	Charmed

Miscellaneous crew

Year	Title	Role
1987	Vietnam War Story	Executive in charge of production for HBO
1994	Tales from the Crypt	Crypt keeper sequences director

As an actor

Year	Title	Role
1987	The Hitchhiker	Phil Murgo
1989	Freddy's Nightmares	Max's Dad

Second unit director or assistant director

Year	Title	Role
1994	Tales from the Crypt	Crypt keeper sequences director
