= Swimming pool (disambiguation) =

A swimming pool is an artificially enclosed body of water that can be used for swimming.

Swimming pool may also refer to:

== Film ==
- Swimming Pool (1976 film), an Indian Malayalam-language film
- Swimming Pool (2001 film), a German slasher film with James McAvoy, known in Germany as Der Tod feiert mit
- Swimming Pool (2003 film), a film directed by Francois Ozon, with Charlotte Rampling and Ludivine Sagnier
- The Swimming Pool (1969 film), also known as La Piscine, a 1969 French–Italian film with Alain Delon and Romy Schneider
- The Swimming Pool (1977 film), a Bulgarian film
- The Swimming Pool (2012 film), a Cuban film

== Television ==
- "Swimming Pool", a 1956 episode of December Bride
- "Swimming Pool", episode one of The Shiny Show, 2002
- "Swimming Pool", a 2008 episode of Nuzzle and Scratch
- "Swimming Pool", a 2014 episode of Motu Patlu
- "The Swimming Pool", a 1954 episode of The Adventures of Ozzie and Harriet
- "The Swimming Pool", a 1960 episode of The Flintstones
- "The Swimming Pool", a 1972 episode of Crystal Tipps and Alistair
- "The Swimming Pool", a 1973 episode of Wait Till Your Father Gets Home
- "The Swimming Pool", a 1999 episode of Kipper
- "The Swimming Pool", a 2004 episode of According to Jim
- "The Swimming Pool", a 2019 episode of Pablo

== Music ==
- Swimming Pool (album), 1998 and last album by Al Jones
- "Swimming Pool" (song), a 2024 song by Florrie
- "Swimming Pools (Drank)", a 2012 song by rapper Kendrick Lamar
- "Swimming Pool", the original title of "I'll Hold My Breath" by Ellie Goulding from her debut album Lights (2010)
- "Swimming Pool", a 2019 song by Red Velvet from their Japanese EP Sappy
- "Swimming Pools", a song by Troye Sivan from the deluxe edition of the 2015 album Blue Neighbourhood

== Other uses ==
- Olympic-size swimming pool
- Lido (swimming pool), outdoor swimming pool
- Swimming Pool, a marina-front portion of the Circuit de Monaco of the Monaco Grand Prix, in Monte-Carlo, Monaco

== See also ==
- Public Swimming Pools in Hong Kong
- Category:Swimming venues
