= The Lost Empire (1984 film) =

- VHS promotional poster
- Directed by: Jim Wynorski
- Written by: Jim Wynorski
- Produced by: Jim Wynorski
- Starring: Melanie Vincz; Raven De La Croix; Angela Aames; Paul Coufos; Robert Tessier; Angus Scrimm
- Cinematography: Jacques Haitkin
- Edited by: Larry Bock
- Music by: Alan Howarth
- Distributed by: JGM Enterprises
- Release dates: June 22, 1984 (Wilmington, North Carolina); February 1985 (US)
- Running time: 83 minutes
- Country: United States
- Language: English

The Lost Empire is a 1984 American action adventure film written, produced, and directed by Jim Wynorski in his directorial debut. It stars Melanie Vincz, Raven De La Croix, and Angela Aames as women who infiltrate a fortified island ruled by an undead wizard (Angus Scrimm) and his evil cult. The premiered on June 22, 1984 in Wilmington, North Carolina, followed by a general release in February 1985.

== Plot ==
The film opens at a jewelry shop in Chinatown, which contains a statue with one glowing red eye. Three masked figures kill the store's owner, then try to pry the eye free. The police arrive, and after a bloody fight, all of the intruders and all but one of the policemen are dead, with the lone survivor being seriously wounded.

The next day, children are being held hostage in an elementary school. A black-clad figure enters and takes on the terrorists, killing all three before revealing that she is Inspector Angel Wolfe (Melanie Vincz) of the L.A.P.D. A man enters the school room and Angel strikes him, breaking his nose and knocking him down, before realizing that the newcomer is Federal Agent Rick Stanton (Paul Coufos), an old friend. The two spend the night together.

The next morning, Angel receives a phone call telling her that her brother Rob (Bill Thornbury), is in the hospital after the jewelry shop confrontation. Angel and Rick rush to his side, and Rob gives Angel a strange star-shaped object and a cryptic message that "the Devil exists, and the Eye knows where." Rick recognizes the star and tells Angel about the legend of Lee Chuck (Angus Scrimm), who gained immortality at the price of giving the devil a new soul every day.

Angel pays a visit to the crime scene. As she gazes sadly at the spot on which her brother was wounded, the glowing red eye drops, unnoticed, from the statue into her handbag. Angel is startled by the sudden appearance of a mysterious Chinese man, who turns out to be Inspector Charles Chang (Art Hern). Chang tells Angel and Rick about the Eyes of Avatar, into which the Dragon-God placed enough power to allow anyone possessing them both to rule the world; and about his belief that Lee Chuck is both real, and in possession of one of the Eyes. He further tells them that Dr Sin Do (Angus Scrimm, in a dual role), the leader of a religious cult, is somehow involved with Lee Chuck.

After learning that Rob has died from his injuries, a grief-stricken Angel forces Rick to tell her more about Sin Do, who is recruiting women for an army of terrorists, luring them to his island by promising them fabulous wealth. When she hears that Sin Do only accepts women in trios, Angel travels to an Indian reservation to see Whitestar (Raven De La Croix), an old friend, and asks her to join the mission, to which Whitestar agrees. The third recruit is Heather McClure (Angela Aames), a criminal who Angel promises a parole in exchange for her help. The three sign on, and are flown by plane to Sin Do's mysterious island fortress of Golgatha.

== Cast ==
- Melanie Vincz as Angel Wolfe
- Raven De La Croix as Whitestar
- Angela Aames as Heather McClure
- Paul Coufos as Rick Stanton
- Robert Tessier as Koro
- Angus Scrimm as Dr. Sin Do / Lee Chuck
- Blackie Dammett as Prager
- Linda Shayne as Cindy Blake
- Kenneth Tobey as Captain Hendry
- Tom Rettig as Officer Robinson
- Angelique Pettyjohn as "Whiplash"
- Art Hern as Charles Chang
- Anne Gaybis as Prison Referee
- Bill Thornbury as Rob Wolfe

== Production ==
Wynorksi had written a number of films for Roger Corman and this was his directorial debut. Finance came from a theatre owner, Henry Plitt. Wynorski said Plitt "wanted to make a low budget sci-fi action picture as a tax loss. I never knew that when I made the show, so I put my heart and soul into the project."

Corman did not finance the film, but Wynorski used Corman's studio to build many of the interior and exterior sets.

== Release ==
Wynorski later said Corman "hated" the film "but acknowledged I'd put the camera in some very interesting places and the girls were pretty."

Wynorski says when the film "finally got completed, Plitt actually liked it enough to give it a wide theatrical release - where it actually made some money."

== Home media ==
The film was released on VHS and Laserdisc by Lightning Video in 1984.

After this however the film's legal status became uncertain due to changes in ownership at Plitt Theatres. "It was always a deep regret of mine that my first film was caught in this limbo," says Wynorski "For years I did all kinds of detective work trying to get my film seen."

With the assistance of producer Bill Dever, Wynroski tracked down the owner of the assets of Plitt and re-acquired the rights. Some thirty years later, after being out of print for more than two decades, it was released on DVD in Region 1 by Polyscope Media in 2014, with Pegasus releasing the film in Region 2. Bonus features included an isolated soundtrack, still photo gallery, and commentary track by director Jim Wynorski.
