= List of The Partridge Family episodes =

The following is a list of episodes for the American television sitcom The Partridge Family. All four seasons have been released on DVD by Sony Pictures.

== Series overview ==
Season	Episodes	Originally released	
Season	Episodes	First released	Last released
1	25	September 25, 1970	March 19, 1971
2	24	September 17, 1971	March 17, 1972
3	25	September 15, 1972	March 23, 1973
4	22	September 15, 1973	March 23, 1974

== Episodes ==
=== Season 1 (1970–71) ===
No. overall	No. in season	Title	Directed by	Written by	Original release date
1	1	"What? And Get Out of Show Business?"	Jerry Paris	Bernard Slade	September 25, 1970
When their mother (Shirley Jones) fills in for a sick singer, The Partridge Family is born. Danny (Danny Bonaduce) persuades Reuben Kincaid (Dave Madden) to manage them and they play their first performance, which might also be their last. Cameo appearance made by: Johnny Cash Songs: "Let the Good Times In"; "Together (Havin' a Ball)"
2	2	"The Sound of Money"	Peter Baldwin	Martin Ragaway	October 2, 1970
A minor fender bender turns into a major pain for the Partridges when they decide to fight a fraudulent lawsuit from Whiplash Willie. Guest Stars: Harry Morgan as 'Whiplash' Willie Larkin, and Farrah Fawcett Song: "I'll Leave Myself a Little Time"
3	3	"Whatever Happened to the Old Songs?"	Jerrold Bernstein	Bernard Slade	October 9, 1970
Shirley's dad is having a mid-life crisis and decides to hit the road with the band to pursue his long-lost dream of being a star, but will his act appeal to the new generation? Guest Stars: Ray Bolger and Rosemary DeCamp as Fred and Amanda Renfrew Songs: "Baby I Love Love, I Love You"; "Together (Havin' a Ball)"; "On the Road"; "Bye Bye Blackbird"
4	4	"See Here, Private Partridge!"	Claudio Guzmán	Gordon Mitchell, Lloyd Turner	October 16, 1970
Just as they're about to record their first album, the Partridges have a bomb dropped on them: ten-year-old Danny's been drafted into the Army. Guest stars: Jack Riley as Corporal Wrzesinski, Jonathan Daly as Officer Moody Song: "On the Road"
5	5	"When Mother Gets Married"	Ralph Senensky	Bernard Slade	October 23, 1970
Shirley begins dating an old flame but the kids are suspicious of him, especially when they see him leave a jewelry store with a beautiful young woman. Guest Stars: John McMartin as Larry, Jaclyn Smith as Tina Songs: "I Really Want to Know You"
6	6	"Love at First Slight"	Bob Claver	Steven Pritzker	October 30, 1970
Now that their record is out, Keith finds himself with major girl trouble: he cannot keep them away from him! But his troubles really begin when he falls for the one who doesn't care who he is. Guest stars: Lane Bradbury as Janet, Claire Wilcox as Cathy Song: "Somebody Wants To Love You"
7	7	"Danny and the Mob"	Jerrold Bernstein	Ron Friedman	November 6, 1970
While performing in Las Vegas, Danny tutors the beautiful girlfriend of a mob boss in finances so she can leave town and finds himself with a new hit but one that has nothing to do with music. Guest Stars: Pat Harrington Jr. as Harry, Barbara Rhoades as LaVon LaVerne, Richard Bakalyan as Skee, Vic Tayback as Rocco Song: "That'll Be the Day"
8	8	"But the Memory Lingers On"	E.W. Swackhamer	Bernard Slade	November 13, 1970
The Partridge Family is about to leave a different kind of lasting impression on their audience after a skunk hitches a ride on their bus and leaves them . . . and all their clothes . . . covered with the unpleasant scent. Songs: "I Think I Love You", "Brand New Me"
9	9	"Did You Hear the One About Danny Partridge?"	Paul Junger Witt	Ron Friedman	November 20, 1970
After a mishap onstage leaves the audience laughing, Danny takes it upon himself to provide a little comic relief to their show. Unfortunately, he's not as funny as he thinks he is. Guest Stars: Morey Amsterdam as Ziggy Shnurr, Jackie Coogan as Max Pepper Songs: "Somebody Wants to Love You", "All of the Things"
10	10	"Go Directly to Jail"	Claudio Guzmán	Dale McRaven	November 27, 1970
The Partridge Family find themselves with a captive audience when they perform at a prison, but then find themselves being held captive by a prisoner who wants them to hear his songs. Guest Star: Stuart Margolin as Hank Songs: "Singin' My Song", "Only a Moment Ago"
11	11	"This Is My Song"	Jerry Paris	Richard De Roy	December 4, 1970
While Keith struggles with a creative dry spell, Danny attempts to write his first hit. Their sibling rivalry peaks when Danny writes a great song just as Keith has a breakthrough with the exact same tune. Songs: "To Be Lovers"
12	12	"My Son, the Feminist"	Peter Baldwin	Richard De Roy	December 11, 1970
Keith promises his feminist girlfriend that the Partridge Family will perform at an upcoming rally, which puts them under attack from the morality watchdog group in their neighborhood. Guest Star: Jane Actman as Tina Song: "I Think I Love You"
13	13	"Star Quality"	Harry Falk	Bernard Slade	December 18, 1970
When Danny gets singled out in a review by a prominent journalist, the praise goes to his head and he decides to go solo. But he changes his mind when he sees his family happily auditioning for his replacement. Guest Stars: Dick Clark as himself, Mitzi Hoag as Sheila Faber Song: "Singin' My Song"
14	14	"The Red Woodloe Story"	Peter Baldwin	Coslough Johnson	January 1, 1971
During a stopover in a small town, the Partridges offer to revive the career of a folk legend who's been out of circulation for twenty years, but find that he would rather sing in church than be in the spotlight. Guest Star: William Schallert as Red Woodloe Songs: "I Can Feel Your Heartbeat", "Find Peace in Your Soul"
15	15	"Mom Drops Out"	Harry Falk	Peter Meyerson	January 8, 1971
Reuben books a European tour but there's one condition: the groovy promoter thinks Shirley's too old. She quits the band, but discovers she has fans there after all. Guest Star: Gino Conforti as Logan Mays Songs: "Baby I Love Love, I Love You"; "I Can Feel Your Heartbeat"
16	16	"Old Scrapmouth"	Herbert Kenwith	James S. Henerson	January 15, 1971
Laurie gets braces right before a television show comes to film the band. As if that isn't bad enough, when they begin to play, her braces pick up radio signals and all she can hear is The Rolling Stones! Guest Star: Mark Hamill as Jerry Song: "The Love Song"
17	17	"Why Did the Music Stop?"	Alan Rafkin	Bernard Slade	January 22, 1971
Shirley has doubts about what being on the road is doing to the Partridges' lives so she suggests they take a break and start living like a normal family again. But she forgets one thing: they're not a normal family. Guest Star: Richard Mulligan as Dr. Jim Lucas Songs: "I'm Here, You're Here"; "I Can Feel Your Heartbeat"
18	18	"The Soul Club"	Paul Junger Witt	Harry Winkler, Harry Dolan	January 29, 1971
Due to a booking mix-up, two Detroit club owners expecting the Temptations get the Partridge Family instead. Can they find an audience in Motown? Guest Stars: Richard Pryor as A.E. Simon, Louis Gossett Jr. as Sam Simon Song: "Bandala" Note: In 1997, TV Guide ranked this episode #78 on its list of the 100 Greatest Episodes.
19	19	"To Play or Not to Play"	Ralph Senensky	Stan Cutler, Martin Donovan	February 5, 1971
Laurie refuses to cross the picket line and play when the hotel workers where they're scheduled to perform go out on strike. Guest Stars: Harvey Lembeck as Marino, Michael Lembeck as Marc Songs: "There's No Doubt in My Mind"; "Umbrella Man"
20	20	"They Shoot Managers, Don't They?"	Peter Baldwin	Gordon Mitchell, Lloyd Turner	February 12, 1971
The Partridges are happy for Reuben when he falls in love and decides to marry, even though his new life doesn't include managing the band – but the band quickly finds they can't manage without him. Guest Star: Nancy Malone as Cathleen Song: "She'd Rather Have the Rain"
21	21	"Partridge Up a Pear Tree"	Ralph Senensky	Gordon Mitchell, Lloyd Turner	February 19, 1971
Danny forces Keith to put the brakes on his spending when his car drains his finances and he realizes he may not be able to afford to take his girlfriend to the prom. Guest Stars: Annette O'Toole as Carol, Carl Ballantine as Pitchman Song: "You Are Always on My Mind"
22	22	"Road Song"	Alan Rafkin	Dale McRaven	February 26, 1971
The Partridges find themselves in the middle of a domestic squabble when they give a ride to a teenage girl—who turns out to be a serial runaway, with the police hot on her trail. Guest Stars: Laurie Prange as Maggie Newton, Sandy Kenyon as Maggie's Father, Ian Wolfe as Grandpa Song: "Point Me in the Direction of Albuquerque"
23	23	"Not with My Sister, You Don't!"	Mel Swope	Dale McRaven	March 5, 1971
The rumor mill starts buzzing at school when a hot new guy arrives on campus. Keith initially sees him as a rival until Laurie, who doesn't believe the rumors, accepts a date with the alleged Lothario. Guest Star: Michael Ontkean as Lester Braduck Song: "I'll Meet You Halfway" Note: Susan Dey and Michael Ontkean would work together again in the 1993 made-for-TV movie "Whose Child is This? The War for Baby Jessica", based on the then-recent custody fight over a young girl named Jessica DeBoer.
24	24	"A Partridge by Any Other Name"	Harry Falk	Ron Friedman	March 12, 1971
A series of coincidences leads Danny to believe he was adopted and there doesn't seem to be anything anyone can say to convince him he's a natural-born Partridge. Guest Stars: Bernard Fox as Marty Burnes, Ned Glass as Detective Harry Klein, Art Metrano as Mike Young Songs: "Doesn't Somebody Want to Be Wanted"; "I Can Feel Your Heartbeat"
25	25	"A Knight in Shining Armor"	Earl Bellamy	Bernard Slade	March 19, 1971
When the Partridges introduce a hip, multi-talented musician to a square, tone-deaf poet, no one expects them to score a hit—but somehow they manage to do just that. Guest Stars: Bobby Sherman as Bobby Conway and Wes Stern as Lionel Poindexter Song: "Stephanie" Notes: This was Jeremy Gelbwaks' final episode as Chris Partridge. Back-door pilot for the short-lived series Getting Together. An unaired version of this episode, titled "Words And Music", runs 33 minutes, and guest-stars Farrah Fawcett and Pat Boone.

=== Season 2 (1971–72) ===
No. overall	No. in season	Title	Directed by	Written by	Original release date
26	1	"Dora, Dora, Dora"	Ralph Senensky	Gordon Mitchell, Lloyd Turner	September 17, 1971
The Partridges learn that Reuben has booked them as backup for a beautiful 18-year-old girl...whose singing voice makes Edith Bunker sound like Cher. Guest stars: Robyn Millan as Dora Kelly, Jack Burns as Stillman Kelly Song: "I Woke Up In Love This Morning" Notes: Brian Forster's first episode as Chris Partridge. This episode debuts "Come On, Get Happy" (which used the same tune as "When We're Singing") as the new opening theme.
27	2	"In 25 Words or Less"	Richard Kinon	Martin Ragaway	September 24, 1971
In order to boost publicity for the family, Reuben stages a contest in which the winner will spend a week with the Partridges. Unfortunately, the winner is a 60-year-old Jewish mother. Guest star: Kay Medford as Gloria Neugast Songs: "Echo Valley 2-6809"
28	3	"A Man Called Snake"	Richard Kinon	Alan Mandel & Charles Shyer	October 1, 1971
A motorcycle gang member develops a crush on Laurie, and she shocks everyone when she agrees to go out with him. Guest Star: Rob Reiner as Snake Song: "Listen To The Sound"
29	4	"The Undergraduate"	Ralph Senensky	Susan Silver	October 8, 1971
When Shirley enrolls in college, one of her male classmates develops a crush on her, much to the chagrin of his parents. Guest stars: Michael Burns as Paul Bruner, Norman Fell and Ann Morgan Guilbert as Mr. and Mrs. Bruner Song: "Brown Eyes"
30	5	"Anatomy of a Tonsil"	Lou Antonio	Coslough Johnson	October 15, 1971
Danny has to have his tonsils out and as the operation approaches, he believes he is going to die. Afterward, he believes he has lost his singing voice. Guest star: Gary Dubin in his first of several appearances as Danny's best friend Punky Lazaar Song: "Love Is All That I Ever Needed"
31	6	"Whatever Happened to Moby Dick?"	E.W. Swackhamer	Peggy Chantler Dick	October 22, 1971
Danny wants to add a singing whale to the act in order to cash in on the ecology movement. Guest stars: Bert Convy as Dr. Whelander, Dub Taylor as Flicker, and Howard Cosell as himself Song: "Whale Song"
32	7	"Dr. Jekyll and Mr. Partridge"	Mel Swope	William S. Bickley	October 29, 1971
Keith is determined to be a good influence on his brothers and sisters, but goes overboard with his good intentions. Song: "Summer Days" Note: Keith reveals his middle name is Douglas
33	8	"Days of Acne and Roses"	Richard Kinon	Dale McRaven	November 5, 1971
The Partridges help a young, awkward delivery boy build up his confidence in the dating department. Song: "I'm On My Way Back Home" Note: Future It's a Living star Ann Jillian appears in this episode as "Girl No. 2" towards the end of the episode.
34	9	"Tale of Two Hamsters"	Roger Duchowny	Gordon Mitchell, Lloyd Turner	November 12, 1971
When the Partridge kids decide to raise hamsters and their little pets keep multiplying, the family is forced to bring them along on tour. Guest star: Gordon Jump as Albertson Songs: "24 Hours A Day"; "I Woke Up In Love This Morning" Note: Brian Forster's Chris Partridge is seen autographing a copy of the family's debut LP, "The Partridge Family Album", although it is the first Chris (Jeremy Gelbwaks) in the group photo on the back cover.
35	10	"The Forty-Year Itch"	Ralph Senensky	Steven Pritzker	November 19, 1971
Shirley's mom and dad are about to split up over his new hip lifestyle, so the family devises a plan to get them back together. Guest Stars: Ray Bolger and Rosemary DeCamp as Fred and Amanda Renfrew Songs: "Together"; "My Best Girl"
36	11	"I Can Get It for You Retail"	Russ Mayberry	Bernard Slade	November 26, 1971
In order to buy his mom a mink coat for her birthday, Danny starts stealing and selling off Keith's possessions to his lovesick fans. Song: "Every Little Bit O' You"
37	12	"Guess Who's Coming to Drive?"	Ralph Senensky	Bob Rodgers	December 10, 1971
The Partridges hire a temporary bus driver who turns out to be an ex-con. Guest star: Milt Kamen as Johnny Song: "Rainmaker"
38	13	"Don't Bring Your Guns to Town, Santa"	Richard Kinon	Bernard Slade	December 17, 1971
When their bus breaks down in a ghost town, it looks like the family will miss Christmas, so a prospector entertains them with a Christmas tale set in the Old West. Guest star: Dean Jagger as Charlie Song: "Have Yourself a Merry Little Christmas"
39	14	"Where Do Mermaids Go?"	Lou Antonio	Peggy Chantler Dick	December 31, 1971
A free-spirited girl leaves the Partridges one million dollars, and suddenly their lives are turned upside down as they deal with their newfound wealth. Guest Star: Meredith Baxter as Jenny Song: "It's Time That I Knew You Better"
40	15	"Home Is Where the Heart Was"	Jerry London	Dick Bensfield, Perry Grant	January 7, 1972
After Chris and Tracy are scolded for leaving a mess, they decide to run away . . . to Reuben's apartment. Guest Star: Elaine Giftos as Bonnie Kleinschmidt Songs: "I Would Have Loved You Anyway", "Summer Days"
41	16	"Fellini, Bergman, and Partridge"	Jerome Courtland	Martin Cohan	January 14, 1972
Keith tries to prove he is a great filmmaker, but not everyone thinks so . . . until a movie theater agrees to show his "masterpiece". Song: "Hello, Hello"
42	17	"Waiting for Bolero"	Jerry London	Martin Cohan	January 21, 1972
In order to be independent, Keith moves into a room in the house next door. Song: "Every Song Is You"
43	18	"I Am Curious . . . Partridge"	Lou Antonio	Bob Rodgers	January 28, 1972
Keith and Shirley get some unsavory publicity when Danny writes a story about them for the local paper. Song: "If You Ever Go"
44	19	"My Heart Belongs to a Two-Car Garage"	Jerry London	William S. Bickley	February 4, 1972
A Russian handyman, who claims to be a world-class artist, paints a nude woman on the family's garage that puts the neighborhood in an uproar. Guest Star: Arte Johnson as Nicholas Minsky Pushkin Song: "Last Night"
45	20	"H-e-l-l-l-l-l-p!!!"	Paton Price	Dale McRaven	February 11, 1972
When the Partridge women go camping in the wilderness, the Partridge men decide to follow them, just in case they need to be rescued. Guest Star: Cindy Henderson as Girl Scout Song: "I'm On My Way Back Home"
46	21	"Promise Her Anything, But Give Her a Punch"	Bob Claver	Dale McRaven	February 18, 1972
Danny is in love for the first time. But the 11-year-old girl he would like to ask to the sixth grade dance would rather go with Keith. Guest Star: Patti Cohoon as Gloria Hickey Song: "I Would Have Loved You Anyway"
47	22	"The Partridge Papers"	Jerry London	William S. Bickley	March 3, 1972
Danny donates Laurie's diary to the school auction by mistake, and the editor threatens to publish it in the high school paper. This includes a Mission: Impossible send-up. Song: "It's One of Those Nights (Yes Love)".
48	23	"All's War in Love and Fairs"	Mel Swope	John Wilder	March 10, 1972
A married couple tries to get the Partridges to perform at a benefit in order to aid Native Americans. Guest star: Harry Morgan as Cal Songs: "Come On, Love", "Rainmaker"
49	24	"Who Is Max Ledbetter, and Why Is He Saying All Those Horrible Things?"	Christopher Morgan	Bernie Kahn	March 17, 1972
A former psychic whose business is in trouble cons Danny and Keith into lending him money by predicting bad luck during an upcoming Partridge Family concert. Guest star: John Banner as Max Ledbetter Song: "You Don't Have To Tell Me"

=== Season 3 (1972–73) ===
No. overall	No. in season	Title	Directed by	Written by	Original release date
50	1	"This Male Chauvinist Piggy Went to Market"	Richard Kinon	Dale McRaven	September 15, 1972
Laurie embarrasses Keith by defending him from Goose, the school bully. Guest Stars: James Carroll Jordan as Goose, David Jollife as 1st Biker, Tim Patrick as Guy, Cindy Cassell as Girl Song: "God Bless You Girl"
51	2	"M Is for the Many Things"	Lou Antonio	William S. Bickley	September 22, 1972
Shirley is chosen as "Mother of The Year" by a magazine, but she and the family experience a not-so-smooth journey to the award ceremony in Sacramento. Guest stars: Edgar Buchanan as Judge McElwreath, Rick Hurst as Deputy Haynie, Yvonne Wilder as Sheila, Mitzi Hoag as Mrs. Halfussi, Jack Lukes as Driver Song: "As Long As There's You"
52	3	"Princess and The Partridge"	Richard Kinon	William S. Bickley	September 29, 1972
Keith dates a princess. Guest stars: Season Hubley as Princess Jennie, Laurie Main as Frederic La Forge, Hal Buckley as Cecil Turnbow, John Bernard as Valentine, Sheldon Lee as Photographer Song: "Together We're Better"
53	4	"Each Dawn I Diet"	Richard Kinon	Lloyd Turner, Gordon Mitchell	October 6, 1972
Reuben and Danny become roomies while wagering on a bet to tackle their vices. Song: "It's All In Your Mind"
54	5	"A Penny for His Thoughts"	Bob Claver	Dale McRaven	October 13, 1972
Biker pal Snake returns to the Partridges, desperate. He's in love, but suicidal because his beloved Penny has rejected his marriage proposal. Guest stars: Stuart Margolin as Snake, Judie Stein as Penny, James Beach as Tinker, Henry Olek as Gorgo, Helen Kleeb and Bryan O'Byrne as Penny's parents, Bill Quinn as the Pastor Song: "Love Must Be The Answer"
55	6	"You're Only Young Twice"	Lee Philips	Susan Silver	October 20, 1972
Danny's problems in school become a problem at home, when his quest to become more "mature" alienates him from the family. Guest star: Charlotte Rae as Dr. Beecher, Bruce Kimmel as Richard Whipple, Maggie Wellman as Molly, Patti Cohoon as Gloria Hickey Song: "Am I Losing You"
56	7	"The Modfather"	E. W. Swackhamer	Susan Harris	October 27, 1972
Shirley's parents try to enliven their marriage. Guest stars: Ray Bolger and Rosemary De Camp as Grandpa and Grandma, Bill Zuckert as Dwight, Gordon Jump as Minister, Toni Berrell as Candy, Ondine Vaughn as Daisy Songs: "Something New Got Old" Note: Grandpa Renfrew's first name has been changed from Fred to Walter
57	8	"A Likely Candidate"	Herb Wallerstein	Martin Cohan	November 3, 1972
Keith campaigns for a politician who likes Shirley. Guest star: Bert Convy as Richard Lawrence, Ann Carol Pearson as Cathy Songs: "One Day At A Time", "Ain't Love Easy"
58	9	"Swiss Family Partridge"	Lou Antonio	Dale Mcraven	November 10, 1972
A days-long rainstorm strands the Partridges in a remote cabin. Tempers flare as the family compete over who will get the two small beds and the meager supply of food. Guest Stars: Charles Shull as E.J. Whacker Song: "It Means I'm In Love With You"
59	10	"Ain't Loveth Grand?"	Herb Wallerstein	William S. Bickley	November 17, 1972
Laurie falls for a minister. Her mother fears their relationship is moving too fast. Guest star: Anthony Geary as Greg Houser, Ta-Tanisha as Mary-Lou Trimper Song: "Sunshine" Notes: This episode saw The Partridge Family surpass the number of episodes of a previous sitcom from Screen Gems concerning a made-for-TV rock band: The Monkees.
60	11	"Whatever Happened to Keith Partridge?"	Bruce Bilson	Susan Harris	November 24, 1972
A talent scout recruits Keith for a movie role. Guest Stars: Shelley Morrison as Mrs. Kornegge, Robert B. Williams as Otis Butrum, Mark Lambert as Dale, Jim Connell as Gus Gorney, Ray Buktenica as Assistant Director, Pat Peterson as Guard, Cindy Cassell as Kitty, Claire Wilcox as Cindy Song: "Looking Through The Eyes Of Love"
61	12	"Nag, Nag, Nag"	E. W. Swackhamer	Steve Pritzker	December 8, 1972
Danny wins an insomniac racehorse. Guest star: Slim Pickens as Will Fowler, Lázaro Pérez as Pete Navarro, Dick Balduzzi as Homer Peck Song: "Breaking Up Is Hard To Do"
62	13	"For Sale by Owner"	Russ Mayberry	Charlotte Brown	December 29, 1972
The Partridges try to sell their house. Guest stars: Bert Freed and Lurene Tuttle as Mr. and Mrs. Sharp, Gordon Jump as Father, Donna Lynne as Girl, Marilyn Childs as Mrs. Gibson, Bobby Baum as Ed Hoffsteader, Sari Price as Mother, Susan Neher as Gwen, Robin Raymond as The Woman Song: "As Long As You're There"
63	14	"Aspirin at 7, Dinner at 8"	Bob Claver	Susan Harris	January 5, 1973
Shirley tries to ditch an ardent suitor and his mother. Guest stars: Gerald Hiken as Dr. Bernie Applebaum, Nancy Walker as Mrs. Applebaum, Donald Phelps as Maitre'D Song: "One Day At a Time"
64	15	"For Whom the Bell Tolls . . . and Tolls . . . and Tolls"	E. W. Swackhamer	Dale Mcraven	January 12, 1973
After the Partridge home is burglarized, Reuben has a security alarm installed . . . with disastrous results when the alarm keeps getting set off accidentally. Guest star: Arte Johnson as Morris Dinkler, Nelson D. Cuevas as Officer Metscur, Mel Gallagher as Sam Barner Song: "Sunshine Eyes"
65	16	"Trial of the Partridge One"	Jerry London	Steve Zacharias, Michael Leeson	January 19, 1973
Laurie is dragged into student court at school when she's caught unwittingly returning a copy of a stolen math test to her teacher. Guest Stars: Dana Elcar as Mr. Felcher, Noah Keen as Mr. Brown, Eric Laneuville as Judge, Tannis G. Montgomery as Cindy Brown, Jim Wakefield as Brad, Scott Ehrlich as Student, Michelle Cook as Melinda Song: "It's You"
66	17	"I Left My Heart in Cincinnati"	Bob Claver	Dale McRaven	January 26, 1973
At a gig at the Kings Island amusement park outside Cincinnati, Keith finds himself falling for a PR agent, an older woman; before long, Danny also falls for her. Guest stars: Mary Ann Mobley as Audrey Parson, Johnny Bench as Pool Waiter Songs: "Together We're Better", "Girl You Make My Day" Note: This episode aired one year before The Brady Bunch made a similar visit
67	18	"The Eleven-Year Itch"	Richard Kinon	William S. Bickley	February 2, 1973
Shirley's old flame comes to town with his daughter Julie. As they begin to re-ignite old sparks, Julie discovers feelings for Danny. Guest stars: Bert Convy as Richard Lawrence, Jodie Foster as Julie Lawrence, Dennis Lee Smith as Waiter Song: "Walking In The Rain"
68	19	"Bedknobs and Drumsticks"	Herb Wallerstein	Lloyd Turner, Gordon Mitchell	February 9, 1973
Reuben signs the family up for a series of commercials in support of a fast-food chicken outfit looking to change its hokey image. Guest star: William Windom as Uncle Erwin, Elaine Giftos as Bonnie Kleinschmidt, John Lawrence as Conventioneer, Ondine Vaughn as Gwen Song: "Friend & A Lover"
69	20	"Everything You Wanted to Know About Sex . . . but Couldn't Pronounce"	Bob Claver	Dale McRaven	February 16, 1973
Could America's "heartthrob" Keith be failing his sex-education course in school? Guest star: Ramon Bieri as Mr.Grisbee Song: "It Means I'm In Love With You"
70	21	"Forgive Us Our Debits"	Bruce Bilson	Skip Webster	February 23, 1973
A purchase of a $29 cuckoo clock becomes a $2,900 headache when a computer glitch mistakenly overcharges Shirley's credit account. Guest stars: Vic Tayback as Harlan Laws, Alan Oppenheimer as Mr. Atwater, John David Carson as Tom Baker, Robert F. Simon as Mr. Gordon, Gary Morgan as Albert, Lou Frizzell as George Song: "Maybe Someday"
71	22	"The Partridge Connection"	E.W. Swackhamer	Steve Zacharias, Michael Leeson	March 2, 1973
Danny finds himself in trouble when his friend Punky coerces him into shoplifting. Guest stars: Henry Jones as Mr. Phelps, Gary Dubin as Punky, Joseph Perry as Police Sergeant, Jack Collins as M.C., Angela Clarke as Myra Fromacher Song: "I Don't Care"
72	23	"The Selling of the Partridge"	Lee Philips	Steve Zacharias, Michael Leeson	March 9, 1973
Keith finds himself in a hotly contested battle for student-body president with a shy girl for whom Laurie is campaign manager. He finally comes to realize she is more qualified. Guest star: Holly Near as Phyllis Goldberg, David Dominguez as Ted, Geri Berger as Girl #1, Lori Farrow as Girl #2, Jason Wingreen as Principal, Bobby Kramer as Myron, Ann Carol Pearson as Band Member Song: "There'll Come A Time" Note: This storyline had also been used in episode 143 of The Dick Van Dyke Show and in episode 197 of The Andy Griffith Show.
73	24	"Diary of a Mad Millionaire"	Lou Antonio	Steve Zacharias, Michael Leeson	March 16, 1973
The family crosses paths with a rich recluse who is drawn to them but afraid of crowds. Guest star: John Astin as Sidney Rose, Jim Antonio as Pearson, Sari Price as Woman Songs: "One Night Stand", "It Sounds Like You're Saying Hello"
74	25	"Me and My Shadow"	Jerry London	Dale McRaven	March 23, 1973
A mystery writer challenges the Partridges: if all of them can elude his search for 24 hours, he'll donate $25,000 to charity. Guest Stars: Richard Schaal as Rezo, Martin Speer as Lazaar, Bruce Kimmel as Delbert, Susan Neher as Girl Song: "Storybook Love"

=== Season 4 (1973–74) ===
No. overall	No. in season	Title	Directed by	Written by	Original release date
75	1	"Hate Thy Neighbor"	Richard Kinon	George Tibbles, William S. Bickley	September 15, 1973
The Partridges come up against a new neighbor who hates show business and resorts to enforcing noise pollution ordinances against the family. Guest stars: Nita Talbot as Doris Stevens, Ronne Troup as Donna Stevens, Teddy Wilson as Sam Mulvaney Songs: "I'll Never Get Over You", "Sooner Or Later" Note: This episode introduces Ricky Segall to the cast as Ricky Stevens
76	2	"None But the Onely"	Charles Rondeau	Dale McRaven	September 22, 1973
Keith discovers his ladies-man reputation precedes him when the new girl in town refuses to go out with him. Guest star: Kathleen Cody as Dina Firmly, Mike Rupert as Mark and Gary Morgan as Scotty Songs: "Alone Too Long", "Bicycle Song"
77	3	"Beethoven, Brahms, and Partridge"	Charles Rondeau	Bernard Slade	September 29, 1973
Keith is challenged by a new girlfriend to stop making "simple" music, so he tries to write a classical music piece to impress her. Guest stars: Barbara Sigel as Rachel, Harold Gould as Walter Yost Songs: "I'm into Something Good", "When I Grow Up"
78	4	"The Strike-Out King"	E. W. Swackhamer	William S. Bickley	October 6, 1973
After becoming a pest tagging along after Keith and Laurie, Danny is encouraged by Shirley to make friends his own age by trying out for the baseball team. Guest stars: Herb Edelman as Darby Willis, Dick Balduzzi as Marv Fillmore, Gordon Jump as Zack Feldman, Jackie Earle Haley as Rusty Song: "I Wanna Be With You", "Say Hey Willie"
79	5	"Reuben Kincaid Lives"	E. W. Swackhamer	Steve Zacharias, Michael Leeson	October 13, 1973
Shirley encourages the kids to be a little nicer to Reuben, but the plan backfires when Reuben mistakes the show of appreciation for bad news from the doctor. Reuben's middle name is revealed to be Clarence. Guest stars: Margaret Hamilton as Clara Kincaid, Elaine Giftos as Bonnie Kleinschmidt Songs: "I Wouldn't Put Nothing Over On You", "Just Lovin' You" (ending credits mistakenly list "I've Got Your Love All Over Me")
80	6	"Double Trouble"	Herb Wallerstein	Dick Bensfield, Perry Grant	October 20, 1973
Keith pulls the classic boner by having two dates for the same night: one of them is the prettiest girl in school, the other a friend of Laurie's. Guest stars: Elaine Giftos as Bonnie Kleinschmidt, Bobby Kramer as Wally Benton, Cheryl Ladd as Johanna Houser and Cindy Cassell as Sally Winkler Songs: "Oh No, Not My Baby", "A Little Bit Of Lovin'" Note: This marks the third appearance by a Charlie's Angels alumna on the series, following up earlier guest roles by Farrah Fawcett and Jaclyn Smith. Cheryl Ladd is shown in the end credits under her maiden name, "Cheryl Stoppelmoor".
81	7	"The Last of Howard"	Richard Kinon	Dale McRaven	October 27, 1973
Laurie is the object of a rich admirer on a cruise ship, but all is not exactly how it appears. Guest star: Bruce Kimmel as Howard Crump Song: "When Love's Talked About"
82	8	"The Diplomat"	Herb Wallerstein	Paul Lichtman, Howard Storm	November 3, 1973
A smitten ambassador asks Shirley out on a disastrous first date, but his quest for a second date turns her world upside down after she refuses. Guest stars: Richard Mulligan as Howard Lipton, Pat Harrington as Roger Harper Songs: "How Long Is Too Long", "What Kind Of Noise Do You Make"
83	9	"Heartbreak Keith"	Charles Rondeau	Bill Manhoff	November 10, 1973
Keith enrolls in a college sociology course, but finds himself infatuated with an older (and very happily married) co-ed. Guest star: Brooke Bundy as Dory Kimmel Songs: "I Heard You Singing Your Song", "A Secret In My Heart"
84	10	"A Day of Honesty"	Ross Bowman	Lloyd Turner, Gordon Mitchell	November 17, 1973
After Danny gets caught sneaking into a movie theater, Shirley tries teaching him a lesson by enforcing 24 hours of total honesty for the whole family. Songs: "Roller Coaster", "If I Were A Monkey"
85	11	"Al in the Family"	Charles Rondeau	William S. Bickley	November 24, 1973
Reuben's nephew, an aspiring comedian, tries to fill in for the absent manager, with nightmarish results for the Partridges. Guest stars: Alan Bursky as Alan Kincaid, Gino Conforti as Maître D' Songs: "That's The Way It Is With You", "I'm into Something Good"
86	12	"Maid in San Pueblo"	Charles Rondeau	William J. Keenan	December 8, 1973
After her parents start fighting again, Shirley unwittingly hires her mother as the family's new maid. Guest stars: Jackie Coogan as Walter Renfrew, Rosemary DeCamp as Amanda Renfrew Songs: "Workin' On A Groovy Thing", "Grandma (We Love You Just The Way You Are)" Note: Final appearance of Ricky Segall as Ricky
87	13	"Art for Mom's Sake"	Ross Bowman	Michael Leeson	January 12, 1974
Shirley takes up painting as a hobby, but while her art is panned by her family, her teacher seems to think she's the second coming of Picasso. Guest star: Alan Oppenheimer as Lorenzo Bernard Song: "I'll Never Get Over You"
88	14	"Two for the Show"	Charles Rondeau	William S. Bickley	January 19, 1974
Reuben's latest discoveries, a twin singing act, split up because of a crush on a girl, Laurie. Guest stars: Andy and David Williams (nephews of singer Andy Williams), Henry Olek as Skip Radnitz Songs: "Crying In The Rain", "Say It Again"
89	15	"Danny Drops Out"	Roger Duchowny	Dick Bensfield, Perry Grant	January 26, 1974
Danny decides to drop out of school, and focus on songwriting as a career. Guest stars: James Gregory as Claude Tubbles, Mitzi Hoag as Miss Farrow, Gary Durbin as Punky Lazaar Song: "Lookin' For A Good Time"
90	16	"Queen for a Minute"	Ernest Losso	Lloyd Turner, Gordon Mitchell	February 2, 1974
When Laurie's girlfriend is denied a spot on the boys' basketball team, Laurie decides to run for homecoming queen so that people might listen to what she has to say. When Keith and Danny get wind of it, they convince a male friend to challenge her for homecoming queen. Guest stars: Tracy Brooks Swope (daughter of producer Mel Swope) as Frankie, Ken Swofford as Coach, Chris Beaumont as Jerry Bishop Song: "Money, Money"
91	17	"Danny Converts"	Richard Kinon	Dick Bensfield, Perry Grant	February 9, 1974
To impress a Jewish girl, Danny pretends he's Jewish, but when her father, a rabbi, mistakenly believes him, the lie begins to spiral out of control. Guest stars: Noam Pitlik as Rabbi Ben Stern, Lark Geib as Renee Stern, Gary Durbin as Punky Lazaar Song: "I Heard You Singing Your Song"
92	18	"Miss Partridge, Teacher"	Roger Duchowny	Art Baer, Ben Joelson	February 23, 1974
Laurie becomes a student-teacher for Danny's class, but becomes more than anyone bargained for when she overcompensates in class to not look like she's favoring him. Guest stars: Maxine Stuart as Miss Halstead, Gary Durbin as Punky Lazaar Song: "I Wouldn't Put Nothin' Over You"
93	19	"Keith and Lauriebelle"	Roger Duchowny	Dick Bensfield, Perry Grant	March 2, 1974
Dueling dilemmas come together: Laurie needs to get out of babysitting in order to go skiing, and Keith needs someone to make a girl he's interested in jealous. Guest stars: Sherry Miles as Karen Bailey, Jack Stauffer as George Parkington Song: "How Long Is Too Long"
94	20	"Morning Becomes Electric"	Richard Kinon	Lloyd Turner, Gordon Mitchell	March 9, 1974
In an attempt to become a model family for conserving electricity, Danny suggests printing the names of "energy hogs" in the news, but when the Partridge electric meter is read incorrectly, they risk being called "hogs" themselves. Guest stars: Jack Collins as Mayor Towbin, Maureen Reagan (daughter of Ronald Reagan) as Photographer Song: "Sunshine"
95	21	"Pin It on Danny"	Richard Kinon	Art Baer, Ben Joelson	March 16, 1974
Danny gives his mother a found brooch for her birthday, but when the rightful owner of the brooch turns out to be his teacher, he must try to find a way to give it back. Guest stars: Liam Dunn as Salesman, Kathryn Reynolds as Mrs. Bullock, Gary Durbin as Punky Lazaar Song: "I Wanna Be With You"
96	22	". . . - - - . . . (S.O.S.)"	Bob Claver	Dick Bensfield, Perry Grant	March 23, 1974
When an old flame sails into town from the navy, Shirley is smitten, and everyone approves . . . except for Danny, who suspects the sailor has a girl in every port. Guest star: George Chakiris as Captain Chuck Corwin Song: "Roller Coaster"

== TV specials ==
No.	Title	Directed by	Written by	Original release date
1	"Thanksgiving Reunion with The Partridge Family and My Three Sons"	Perry Rosemond	Bo Kaprall	November 25, 1977
A one-hour celebration featuring the casts of The Partridge Family and My Three Sons discussing their current lives and memorable moments from their past shows. Songs: "Strengthen My Love", "He Touched Me", "As Time Goes By", "Moments Make the Memories"
2	"Come On Get Happy: The Partridge Family Story"	David Burton Morris	Jon Denny, Jacqueline Feather, David Seidler	November 13, 1999
A two-hour biographical TV movie focusing on star David Cassidy and co-star Danny Bonaduce through the four years of the show's production. Narrated by Danny Bonaduce
