= Basic Training (1985 film) =

1985 film by Andrew Sugerman

- DVD cover
- Directed by: Andrew Sugerman
- Written by: Bernie Kahn
- Produced by: Gilbert Adler; Otto Salamon
- Starring: Ann Dusenberry; Rhonda Shear
- Cinematography: Stephen W. Gray
- Edited by: Larry Bock
- Music by: Michael Cruz; Linda Schreyer
- Distributed by: (US) MGM (DVD)
- Release date: November 1985 (US)
- Running time: 88 minutes
- Country: United States
- Language: English

Basic Training (a.k.a. Up the Military) is a 1985 sex comedy film by Andrew Sugerman. It is often considered to be one of the worst films of 1985. While set in Washington, D.C., most of the production was filmed in Los Angeles, including Bob Hope Patriotic Hall. During production the working title was "Up The Pentagon."

== Plot ==
Melinda is a female employee of The Pentagon's public information service, who loses her job when she refuses to give in to her male superiors' sexual advances. She then becomes outraged by the Pentagon's "un-patriotic" actions, and takes revenge on them by using her physical charms to seduce the top brass into letting her back into the Pentagon. After being re-employed, she sets out to manipulate them to her will and destroy their careers, thus ridding the US government of what she sees as "perverts", who care more about cheap thrills than national security. She eventually seduces the Russian ambassador into betraying valuable military secrets by offering him among other things "the most scrumptious little breasts" as well as something (left unsaid) which she declares to be the "softest, moistest, sweetest". In the end she is appointed Secretary of Defense as a reward.

== Cast ==
- Ann Dusenberry as Melinda
- Rhonda Shear as Debbie
- Angela Aames as Cheryl
- Will Nye as Lt. Cranston
- Walter Gotell as Nabokov
- Marty Brill as General Strombs
- William A. Forester as General Kane

=== Home media release ===
MGM released a pan and scan DVD in 2003.
