= List of The New Adventures of Old Christine episodes =

This is a list of episodes from the CBS sitcom The New Adventures of Old Christine. The program ran on CBS in the United States from March 13, 2006 to May 12, 2010, broadcasting 88 episodes over five seasons. Every single episode was directed by Andy Ackerman, also one of the executive producers of the show.

== Series overview ==
Season	Episodes	Originally released	
Season	Episodes	First released	Last released
1	13	March 13, 2006	May 22, 2006
2	22	September 18, 2006	May 7, 2007
3	10	February 4, 2008	March 31, 2008
4	22	September 24, 2008	May 20, 2009
5	21	September 23, 2009	May 12, 2010

== Episodes ==
=== Season 1 (2006) ===
No. overall	No. in season	Title	Directed by	Written by	Original release date	Prod. code	U.S. viewers (millions)
1	1	"Pilot"	Andy Ackerman	Kari Lizer	March 13, 2006	475297	12.36
2	2	"Supertramp"	Andy Ackerman	Jeff Astrof	March 13, 2006	2T7452	15.09
3	3	"Open Water"	Andy Ackerman	Adam Barr	March 20, 2006	2T7454	15.13
4	4	"One Toe Over the Line, Sweet Jesus"	Andy Ackerman	Adam Barr	March 27, 2006	2T7455	11.96
5	5	"I'll Show You Mine"	Andy Ackerman	Steve Baldikoski & Bryan Behar	April 3, 2006	2T7456	8.28
6	6	"The Other F Word"	Andy Ackerman	Jeff Astrof	April 10, 2006	2T7461	11.42
7	7	"Long Days Journey Into Stan"	Andy Ackerman	Danielle Evenson	April 17, 2006	2T7457	11.38
8	8	"Teach Your Children Well"	Andy Ackerman	Katie Palmer	April 24, 2006	2T7458	11.81
9	9	"Ritchie Has Two Mommies"	Andy Ackerman	Kari Lizer	May 1, 2006	2T7451	11.92
10	10	"No Fault Divorce"	Andy Ackerman	Jeff Astrof & Adam Barr & Kari Lizer	May 8, 2006	2T7459	11.87
11	11	"Exile on Lame Street"	Andy Ackerman	Story by : Katie Palmer; Teleplay by : Steve Baldikoski & Bryan Behar	May 15, 2006	2T7460	11.44
12	12	"Some of My Best Friends Are Portuguese"	Andy Ackerman	Story by : Katie Palmer; Teleplay by : Steve Baldikoski & Bryan Behar	May 22, 2006	2T7453	7.53
13	13	"A Fair to Remember: Part 1"	Andy Ackerman	Adam Barr & Kari Lizer	May 22, 2006	2T7462	13.06

=== Season 2 (2006–07) ===
No. overall	No. in season	Title	Directed by	Written by	Original release date	Prod. code	US viewers (millions)
14	1	"The Passion Of Christine: Part 2" (Part 2)	Andy Ackerman	Kari Lizer	September 18, 2006	3T5551	12.01
15	2	"The Answer is Maybe: Part 1"	Andy Ackerman	Adam Barr	September 25, 2006	3T5552	12.19
16	3	"Come to Papa Jeff: Part 2"	Andy Ackerman	Jeff Astrof	October 2, 2006	3T5553	13.59
17	4	"Oh God, Yes"	Andy Ackerman	Jennifer Crittenden	October 9, 2006	3T5554	12.88
18	5	"Separation Anxiety"	Andy Ackerman	Danielle Evenson	October 16, 2006	3T5555	13.03
19	6	"The Champ"	Andy Ackerman	Kari Lizer & Adam Barr	October 23, 2006	3T5556	12.10
20	7	"Playdate with Destiny"	Andy Ackerman	Jennifer Crittenden	November 6, 2006	3T5557	11.47
21	8	"Women 'N Tuition"	Andy Ackerman	Jeff Astrof	November 13, 2006	3T5559	11.87
22	9	"Mission: Impossible"	Andy Ackerman	Jonathan Goldstein	November 20, 2006	3T5558	11.48
23	10	"What About Barb?"	Andy Ackerman	Story by : Katie Palmer & Kari Lizer; Teleplay by : Steve Baldikoski & Bryan Behar	November 27, 2006	3T5560	12.01
24	11	"Crash"	Andy Ackerman	Adam Barr	December 11, 2006	3T5561	11.96
25	12	"Ritchie Scores"	Andy Ackerman	Frank Pines	January 8, 2007	3T5563	12.08
26	13	"Endless Shrimp, Endless Night"	Andy Ackerman	Katie Palmer	January 15, 2007	3T5562	9.40
27	14	"Let Him Eat Cake"	Andy Ackerman	Jonathan Goldstein	January 22, 2007	3T5564	12.81
28	15	"Sleepless in Mar Vista"	Andy Ackerman	Story by : Allan Rice; Teleplay by : Danielle Evenson	March 12, 2007	3T5565	7.59
29	16	"Undercover Brother"	Andy Ackerman	Katie Palmer	March 12, 2007	3T5566	8.34
30	17	"Strange Bedfellows"	Andy Ackerman	Kari Lizer	March 19, 2007	3T5567	6.74
31	18	"The Real Thing"	Andy Ackerman	Story by : Charles Zucker; Teleplay by : Jeff Astrof & Danielle Evenson	April 9, 2007	3T5568	7.69
32	19	"Faith Off"	Andy Ackerman	Adam Barr	April 16, 2007	3T5569	6.99
33	20	"My Big Fat Sober Wedding"	Andy Ackerman	Jonathan Goldstein & Katie Palmer	April 23, 2007	3T5570	6.88
34	21	"Friends"	Andy Ackerman	Jennifer Crittenden & Kari Lizer	April 30, 2007	3T5571	7.32
35	22	"Frasier"	Andy Ackerman	Jeff Astrof & Adam Barr	May 7, 2007	3T5572	7.82

=== Season 3 (2008) ===
No. overall	No. in season	Title	Directed by	Written by	Original release date	Prod. code	US viewers (millions)
36	1	"The Big Bang"	Andy Ackerman	Kari Lizer & Jeff Astrof	February 4, 2008	3T6701	9.43
37	2	"Beauty is Only Spanx Deep"	Andy Ackerman	Kari Lizer	February 11, 2008	3T6702	9.90
38	3	"Popular"	Andy Ackerman	Jennifer Crittenden	February 18, 2008	3T6703	9.40
39	4	"Traffic"	Andy Ackerman	Jeff Astrof	February 25, 2008	3T6705	9.15
40	5	"Between a Rock and a Hard Place"	Andy Ackerman	Aaron Shure	March 3, 2008	3T6704	8.35
41	6	"The New Adventures of Old Christine"	Andy Ackerman	Frank Pines	March 10, 2008	3T6706	7.38
42	7	"House"	Andy Ackerman	Katie Palmer	March 10, 2008	3T6707	9.62
43	8	"Burning Down the House"(Part 1)	Andy Ackerman	Aaron Shure	March 17, 2008	3T6708	11.47
44	9	"The Happy Couple"(Part 2)	Andy Ackerman	Jennifer Crittenden	March 24, 2008	3T6709	9.77
45	10	"One and a Half Men"	Andy Ackerman	Story by : Allan Rice & Amy Iglow; Teleplay by : Lew Schneider	March 31, 2008	3T6710	12.57

=== Season 4 (2008–09) ===
No. overall	No. in season	Title	Directed by	Written by	Original release date	Prod. code	US viewers (millions)
46	1	"A Decent Proposal"	Andy Ackerman	Kari Lizer & Jeff Astrof	September 24, 2008	3T7851	6.52
47	2	"How I Hate Your Mother"	Andy Ackerman	Katie Palmer	October 1, 2008	3T7852	6.80
48	3	"White Like Me"	Andy Ackerman	Lew Schneider	October 8, 2008	3T7855	7.53
49	4	"Snakes on a Date"	Andy Ackerman	Lew Schneider	October 15, 2008	3T7853	7.61
50	5	"Everyone Says I Love Except Ritchie"	Andy Ackerman	Jackie Filgo & Jeff Filgo	October 22, 2008	3T7856	7.76
51	6	"Tie Me Up, Don't Tie Me Down"	Andy Ackerman	Sherry Bilsing-Graham & Ellen Kreamer	October 29, 2008	3T7857	7.61
52	7	"So You Think You Can Date"	Andy Ackerman	Sherry Bilsing-Graham & Ellen Kreamer	November 5, 2008	3T7858	6.50
53	8	"Self-Esteem Tempura"	Andy Ackerman	Jeff Astrof	November 12, 2008	3T7854	6.82
54	9	"Rage Against the Christine"	Andy Ackerman	Kari Lizer & Jeff Astrof	November 19, 2008	3T7859	7.85
55	10	"Guess Who's Not Coming to Dinner"	Andy Ackerman	Lew Schneider & Katie Palmer	November 26, 2008	3T7861	7.48
56	11	"Unidentified Funk" (Part 1)	Andy Ackerman	Frank Pines	December 10, 2008	3T7862	7.94
57	12	"Happy Endings" (Part 2)	Andy Ackerman	Jackie Filgo & Jeff Filgo	December 17, 2008	3T7860	7.29
58	13	"Notes on a 7th Grade Scandal"	Andy Ackerman	Allan Rice	January 14, 2009	3T7863	7.18
59	14	"What Happens in Vegas is Disgusting in Vegas"	Andy Ackerman	Sherry Bilsing-Graham & Ellen Kreamer	January 21, 2009	3T7864	7.29
60	15	"Reckless Abandonment"	Andy Ackerman	Jeff Astrof	February 11, 2009	3T7865	6.67
61	16	"Honey, I Ran Over the Kid"	Andy Ackerman	Sherry Bilsing-Graham & Ellen Plummer	February 18, 2009	3T7867	6.72
62	17	"Too Close for Christine"	Andy Ackerman	Amy Iglow	March 11, 2009	3T7866	7.46
63	18	"A Change of Heart/Pants"	Andy Ackerman	Lew Schneider & Frank Pines	March 18, 2009	3T7868	7.21
64	19	"Hair"	Andy Ackerman	Matt Goldman	April 8, 2009	3T7871	7.17
65	20	"He Ain't Heavy"	Andy Ackerman	Sherry Bilsing-Graham	May 6, 2009	3T7872	6.45
66	21	"The Old Maid Honor"	Andy Ackerman	Kari Lizer & Jeff Astrof	May 13, 2009	3T7869	6.50
67	22	"Love: A Cautionary Tale" (Part 1)	Andy Ackerman	Jeff Astrof & Kari Lizer	May 20, 2009	3T7870	5.55

=== Season 5 (2009–10) ===
No. overall	No. in season	Title	Directed by	Written by	Original release date	Prod. code	US viewers (millions)
68	1	"Bahamian Rhapsody" (Part 2)	Andy Ackerman	Kari Lizer & Jeff Astrof	September 23, 2009	3X5601	7.17
69	2	"Burning Love"	Andy Ackerman	Sherry Bilsing-Graham & Ellen Kreamer	September 30, 2009	3X5602	6.65
70	3	"The Mole"	Andy Ackerman	Jack Burditt	October 7, 2009	3X5603	6.86
71	4	"For Love or Money"	Andy Ackerman	Allan Rice	October 14, 2009	3X5604	6.99
72	5	"Doctor Little Man"	Andy Ackerman	Frank Pines	October 21, 2009	3X5605	6.58
73	6	"The Curious Case of Britney B"	Andy Ackerman	Matt Goldman	November 4, 2009	3X5607	6.68
74	7	"Nuts"	Andy Ackerman	Amy Iglow	November 11, 2009	3X5606	7.20
75	8	"Love Means Never Having to Say You're Crazy"	Andy Ackerman	Jeff Astrof	November 18, 2009	3X5608	7.27
76	9	"I Love Woo, I Hate You"	Andy Ackerman	Jack Burditt	November 25, 2009	3X5609	6.86
77	10	"Old Christine Meets Young Frankenstein"	Andy Ackerman	Frank Pines	December 9, 2009	3X5611	7.49
78	11	"It's Beginning to Stink a Lot Like Christmas"	Andy Ackerman	Sherry Bilsing-Graham & Ellen Kreamer	December 16, 2009	3X5610	7.64
79	12	"Whale of a Tale"	Andy Ackerman	Sherry Bilsing-Graham & Ellen Kreamer	January 13, 2010	3X5612	5.97
80	13	"Truth or Dare"	Andy Ackerman	Jack Burditt	January 20, 2010	3X5613	6.21
81	14	"A Family Unfair"	Andy Ackerman	Jeff Astrof	February 10, 2010	3X5614	8.10
82	15	"Sweet Charity"	Andy Ackerman	Frank Pines	March 3, 2010	3X5615	5.56
83	16	"Subway, Somehow"	Andy Ackerman	Amy Iglow & Allan Rice	March 10, 2010	3X5616	7.67
84	17	"Up In The Airport"	Andy Ackerman	Sherry Bilsing-Graham & Ellen Kreamer	April 7, 2010	3X5617	5.97
85	18	"Revenge Makeover"	Andy Ackerman	Tricia O'Kelley & Alex Kapp Horner	April 14, 2010	3X5618	6.18
86	19	"I Love What You Do For Me"	Andy Ackerman	Jack Burditt	April 21, 2010	3X5619	5.20
87	20	"Scream"	Andy Ackerman	Jeff Astrof & Matt Goldman	May 5, 2010	3X5620	6.29
88	21	"Get Smarter"	Andy Ackerman	Kari Lizer	May 12, 2010	3X5621	6.89
