= Fairy Tales (film) =

1978 American film by Harry Hurwitz

- Theatrical poster
- Directed by: Harry Hurwitz
- Produced by: Charles Band
- Starring: Don Sparks; Sy Richardson; Brenda Fogarty; Martha Reeves
- Music by: Andrew Belling
- Release date: 1978
- Running time: 76 minutes 82 minutes (director's cut)
- Country: United States
- Language: English

Fairy Tales, released in the UK as Adult Fairy Tales, is a 1978 American sex comedy directed by Harry Hurwitz, the plot of which revolves around the stereotypical fairy tale.

== Synopsis ==
On his twenty-first birthday, a prince is approached by his father (the king) and other courtiers. They present him a girl as birthday gift. The king asks him to enjoy sexual life and to produce the next heir. However, the prince experiences erectile dysfunction and is unable to perform sexually. He discovers that his sexual attraction is focused towards Sleeping Beauty, a long-forgotten princess, whose picture is hanging on the wall. He goes in search of this princess, and encounters many people along the way. Ultimately, he finds the princess and is able to perform sexually with her.

== Cast ==
- Don Sparks as Prince
- Sy Richardson as Sirus
- Brenda Fogarty as Gussie Gander
- Martha Reeves as Aunt La Voh
- Linnea Quigley as Sleeping Beauty
- Irwin Corey as Dr. Eyes (credited as Prof. Irwin Corey)
- Nai Bonet as Scheherazade
- Robert Staats as Doorman / Tommy Tucker
- Angela Aames as Little Bo Peep
- Bob Leslie as Old King Cole
- Robert Harris as Dr. Ears
- Simmy Bow as Dr. Mustachio
- Anne Gaybis as Snow White
- Frank Ray Perilli as Baron
- Angelo Rossitto as Otto
- Jeff Doucette as Jack
- Lindsay Freeman as Jill
