= List of December Bride episodes =

The following is a list of episodes for the television sitcom December Bride, which aired for five seasons on CBS from 1954 to 1959.

== Series overview ==
Season	Episodes	Originally released		Rank	Rating
Season	Episodes	First released	Last released	Rank	Rating
1	34	October 4, 1954	May 23, 1955	10	34.7
2	31	October 3, 1955	May 14, 1956	6	37.0
3	30	October 8, 1956	May 6, 1957	5	35.2
4	31	October 7, 1957	May 19, 1958	9	30.7
5	31	October 2, 1958	May 7, 1959	—N/a	—N/a

== Episodes ==
=== Season 1 (1954–55) ===
No. overall	No. in season	Title	Original release date
1	1	"Lily Ruskin Arrives"	October 4, 1954
2	2	"Lily Is Bored"	October 11, 1954
3	3	"The Chinese Dinner"	October 18, 1954
4	4	"The Accident"	October 25, 1954
5	5	"The Veterinarian"	November 1, 1954
6	6	"My Soldier"	November 8, 1954
7	7	"Grunion Hunting"	November 15, 1954
8	8	"Lily's Mother-in-Law"	November 22, 1954
9	9	"Lily Hires a Maid"	November 29, 1954
10	10	"The Gigolo"	December 6, 1954
11	11	"The Rich Man"	December 13, 1954
12	12	"The Christmas Show"	December 20, 1954
13	13	"The Luau"	December 27, 1954
14	14	"Lily Wants to Pay Her Way"	January 3, 1955
15	15	"Lily the Artist"	January 10, 1955
16	16	"The Grandfather Clock"	January 17, 1955
17	17	"The Sentimentalist"	January 24, 1955
18	18	"The Uranium Show"	January 31, 1955
19	19	"The Insurance Show"	February 7, 1955
20	20	"Surprise Party"	February 14, 1955
21	21	"Jealousy"	February 21, 1955
22	22	"Wedding Preparations"	February 28, 1955
23	23	"The Breakup"	March 7, 1955
24	24	"Mexico"	March 14, 1955
25	25	"Lily's Niece"	March 21, 1955
26	26	"Matt Cooks"	March 28, 1955
27	27	"Theater Tickets"	April 4, 1955
28	28	"Psychiatrist"	April 11, 1955
29	29	"Gossip"	April 18, 1955
30	30	"Matt's Moustache"	April 25, 1955
31	31	"The Line-Up"	May 2, 1955
32	32	"The Other Couple"	May 9, 1955
33	33	"Lily's Song"	May 16, 1955
34	34	"Chicken Salad"	May 23, 1955

=== Season 2 (1955–56) ===
No. overall	No. in season	Title	Original release date
35	1	"The Boxing Show"	October 3, 1955
36	2	"The Pizza Show"	October 10, 1955
37	3	"Lily and the Wolf"	October 17, 1955
38	4	"Ruth Neglects Matt"	October 24, 1955
39	5	"The Shoplifter"	October 31, 1955
40	6	"Let Yourself Go"	November 7, 1955
41	7	"The Laundromat Show"	November 14, 1955
42	8	"Skid Row"	November 21, 1955
43	9	"Big Game Hunter"	November 28, 1955
44	10	"Family Quarrel"	December 5, 1955
45	11	"High Sierras"	December 12, 1955
46	12	"Rate Your Mate"	December 26, 1955
47	13	"Operation Coleslaw"	January 2, 1956
48	14	"The Trailer Show"	January 9, 1956
49	15	"Matt's Movie Career"	January 16, 1956
50	16	"The Rudy Vallee Show"	January 23, 1956
51	17	"The Texas Show: Part 1"	January 30, 1956
52	18	"The Texas Show: Part 2"	February 6, 1956
53	19	"The Texas Show: Part 3"	February 13, 1956
54	20	"Sunken Den"	February 20, 1956
55	21	"The Wrestler"	February 27, 1956
56	22	"Ruth Gets a Job"	March 12, 1956
57	23	"Handcuffs"	March 19, 1956
58	24	"Pete's Brother-in-Law"	March 26, 1956
59	25	"Lily in a Gas Station"	April 2, 1956
60	26	"Ruth's Haircut"	April 9, 1956
61	27	"Jaywalker"	April 16, 1956
62	28	"The Beauty Pageant"	April 23, 1956
63	29	"Lily and the Sailor"	April 30, 1956
64	30	"Lily the Matchmaker"	May 7, 1956
65	31	"Swimming Pool"	May 14, 1956

=== Season 3 (1956–57) ===
No. overall	No. in season	Title	Original release date
66	1	"The Rory Calhoun Show"	October 8, 1956
67	2	"The Marjorie Main Show"	October 15, 1956
68	3	"House on Blocks"	October 29, 1956
69	4	"The Prize Fighter"	November 5, 1956
70	5	"Ritzy Neighborhood"	November 12, 1956
71	6	"Lily and the Prowler"	November 19, 1956
72	7	"The Jockey"	November 26, 1956
73	8	"The Decorating Show"	December 3, 1956
74	9	"The Indian Show"	December 10, 1956
75	10	"Man Town"	December 17, 1956
76	11	"Football Hero"	December 24, 1956
77	12	"New Year's Party"	December 31, 1956
78	13	"Royalty"	January 7, 1957
79	14	"Chicken Farm"	January 14, 1957
80	15	"The Homecoming Show"	January 21, 1957
81	16	"The Budget Show"	January 28, 1957
82	17	"Study Group"	February 4, 1957
83	18	"Mother-in-Law Club"	February 11, 1957
84	19	"The Piano Show"	February 18, 1957
85	20	"Duck Hunting"	February 25, 1957
86	21	"The Engagement Show"	March 4, 1957
87	22	"Masquerade Party"	March 11, 1957
88	23	"Kissing Booth"	March 18, 1957
89	24	"The Hobo Show"	March 25, 1957
90	25	"Englishman"	April 1, 1957
91	26	"Do It Yourself"	April 8, 1957
92	27	"The Old Man"	April 15, 1957
93	28	"Song Plugging"	April 22, 1957
94	29	"Mountain Climbing"	April 29, 1957
95	30	"Lily-Hilda Fight"	May 6, 1957

=== Season 4 (1957–58) ===
No. overall	No. in season	Title	Original release date
96	1	"Vallee's Protege"	October 7, 1957
97	2	"Mean Grandfather"	October 14, 1957
98	3	"The Golf Lesson"	October 21, 1957
99	4	"Photography Show"	November 4, 1957
100	5	"Sports Car"	November 11, 1957
101	6	"The Microphone Show"	November 18, 1957
102	7	"Matt's Gray Hair"	December 2, 1957
103	8	"The Other Woman"	December 9, 1957
104	9	"The Butler Show"	December 16, 1957
105	10	"Ruth Goes Home to Mother"	December 23, 1957
106	11	"Hot Meal"	December 30, 1957
107	12	"The Airplane Show"	January 6, 1958
108	13	"The Parrot Show"	January 13, 1958
109	14	"The Antique"	January 20, 1958
110	15	"Housemother"	January 27, 1958
111	16	"The Muscleman Show"	February 3, 1958
112	17	"Contour Chair"	February 10, 1958
113	18	"The Fred MacMurray Show"	February 17, 1958
114	19	"Baby Rehearsal"	February 24, 1958
115	20	"Army Buddy"	March 3, 1958
116	21	"The Ed Wynn Show"	March 10, 1958
117	22	"The Bouncer Show"	March 17, 1958
118	23	"Sleep Teaching"	March 24, 1958
119	24	"The Gilbert Roland Show"	March 31, 1958
120	25	"Aunt Emily"	April 7, 1958
121	26	"The Mickey Rooney Show"	April 14, 1958
122	27	"Lily's Birthday Dress"	April 21, 1958
123	28	"Wedding Float"	April 28, 1958
124	29	"The Capistrano Show"	May 5, 1958
125	30	"Lily on Boat"	May 12, 1958
126	31	"Matt-Pete Fight"	May 19, 1958

=== Season 5 (1958–59) ===
No. overall	No. in season	Title	Original release date
127	1	"The Edgar Bergen Show"	October 2, 1958
128	2	"The Alaska Show"	October 9, 1958
129	3	"Fenwick Arms"	October 16, 1958
130	4	"Bride's Father-in-Law"	October 23, 1958
131	5	"The Chimp Show"	October 30, 1958
132	6	"Hilda Gets Engaged"	November 6, 1958
133	7	"The Zsa Zsa Gabor Show"	November 13, 1958
134	8	"Horse Phobia"	November 20, 1958
135	9	"Tough Mother-in-Law"	November 27, 1958
136	10	"Power Saw"	December 4, 1958
137	11	"The Post Office Show"	December 11, 1958
138	12	"Car for Christmas"	December 18, 1958
139	13	"Child of Nature"	December 25, 1958
140	14	"Beatnik Nurse"	January 1, 1959
141	15	"The Nurse Show"	January 8, 1959
142	16	"Pete Has a Baby"	January 15, 1959
143	17	"Nurse Is Fired"	January 22, 1959
144	18	"Lily's Blind Date"	January 29, 1959
145	19	"Lily's Advice Column"	February 5, 1959
146	20	"The Hi-Fi Show"	February 12, 1959
147	21	"The Scotch Show"	February 19, 1959
148	22	"The Martian Show"	February 26, 1959
149	23	"Lily Babysits"	March 5, 1959
150	24	"Ruth the Brain"	March 12, 1959
151	25	"Stan Loses His Nerve"	March 19, 1959
152	26	"The Texan, Rory Calhoun"	March 26, 1959
153	27	"Linda on TV"	April 2, 1959
154	28	"Lily Goes Fishing"	April 9, 1959
155	29	"Lily Helps Twilly"	April 16, 1959
156	30	"Lily the Example"	April 30, 1959
157	31	"Bald Baby"	May 7, 1959
