= Martin Ragaway =

American screenwriter

- Born: January 29, 1923; Brooklyn, New York, U.S.
- Died: April 20, 1989 (aged 66); Los Angeles, California, U.S.
- Resting place: Mount Sinai Memorial Park, Los Angeles
- Occupation: comedy writer
- Years active: 1949–1984

Martin Ragaway (January 29, 1923 – April 20, 1989) was an American comedy writer.

== Career ==
Ragaway's early credits include the Abbott and Costello radio program in the late 1940s. Along with Leonard Stern, he created the "Sam Shovel" spoofs for the show. This led to screenwriting the Abbott and Costello films Africa Screams (1949, uncredited), Abbott and Costello in the Foreign Legion (1950), and Lost in Alaska (1952). Ragaway and Stern also wrote two Ma and Pa Kettle movies: 1950's Ma and Pa Kettle Go to Town, for which they penned the story and screenplay, and 1952's Ma and Pa Kettle At the Fair. They also wrote The Milkman (1952) for Donald O'Connor.

On television, Ragaway shared an Emmy for the 1960–61 season of "The Red Skelton Show", and won Writer's Guild Awards for a 1965 episode of The Dick Van Dyke Show ("My Husband is the Best One") and the 1968 special, "Alan King's Wonderful World of Aggravation."

He also scripted episodes of Get Smart, The Jerry Lewis Show, The Brady Bunch, The Bill Cosby Show, Here's Lucy, I Dream of Jeannie, The Partridge Family, The Odd Couple, Diff'rent Strokes, and The Facts of Life.

In the late 1970s, Ragaway worked on several Dean Martin Celebrity Roasts and the annual Country Music Association awards shows. Among his last credits was the short-lived Billy Crystal Comedy Hour (1982).
