= The New Adventures of Old Christine season 1 =

The New Adventures of Old Christine
- Season 1
- DVD cover
- Starring: Julia Louis-Dreyfus; Clark Gregg; Hamish Linklater; Trevor Gagnon; Emily Rutherfurd; Tricia O'Kelley; Alex Kapp Horner
- No. of episodes: 13

Release
- Original network: CBS
- Original release: March 13 – May 22, 2006

Season chronology
- Next → Season 2

The first season of The New Adventures of Old Christine originally aired on CBS on Monday nights at 9:30/8:30 pm from March 13, 2006 through May 22, 2006. It consisted of 13 episodes.

In this season Christine has only just enrolled her son, Richie at a new posh private school, where she is constantly being humiliated by Marly and Lindsay, some non-working mothers at the school. On top of all this she has just discovered her ex-husband, Richard has started dating a much younger woman who is also named Christine. Christine has a brief fling with Burton but they soon break up due to Christine not being able to commit to the relationship. In the season finale Christine kisses Richard so New Christine breaks up with him. The first season on DVD and Blu-ray Disc box set was released on January 15, 2008.

== Cast and characters ==
=== Main ===
- Julia Louis-Dreyfus as "Old" Christine Campbell
- Clark Gregg as Richard Campbell
- Hamish Linklater as Matthew Kimble
- Trevor Gagnon as Ritchie Campbell
- Emily Rutherfurd as "New" Christine Hunter
- Tricia O'Kelley and Alex Kapp Horner as Marly and Lindsay (a.k.a. "The Meanie Moms")

=== Recurring ===
- Wanda Sykes as Barbara 'Barb' Baran
- Matt Letscher as Burton Shaffer
- Jordan Baker as Mrs. Belt
- Lily Goff as Ashley Ehrhardt
- Marissa Blanchard as Kelsey

=== Guest stars ===
- Amy Farrington as Ali
- Andy Richter as Stan
- Anthony Holiday as Pete
- Scott Lawrence as Nate
- Wendy Raquel Robinson as Anita
- Patrick Kerr as Peter
- Nancy Lenehan as Kit
- Helen Slater as Liz
- Mary Beth McDonough as Mrs. Wilhoite
- Rebecca Creskoff as Hilary
- Ana Ortiz as Belinda

== Episodes ==
No. overall	No. in season	Title	Directed by	Written by	Original release date	Prod. code	U.S. viewers (millions)
1	1	"Pilot"	Andy Ackerman	Kari Lizer	March 13, 2006	475297	12.36
Christine's 8-year-old son, Richie, has been accepted into a posh private school, where Christine encounters two snooty class moms, Marly and Lindsay, who can't seem to grasp the concept that Christine actually works. Her 20-something slacker brother, Matthew, lives with her, but in a pinch, also serves as Ritchie's babysitter.
2	2	"Supertramp"	Andy Ackerman	Jeff Astrof	March 13, 2006	2T7452	15.09
When Christine learns that Richard and "new" Christine are enjoying an intimate relationship, she becomes determined to make her own conquests. After several failed attempts to meet eligible men, she finally runs into a guy named Stan at the grocery store. Unbeknownst to Christine, Stan is a father at Richie's school who is known as "Sad Dad". Note: For this episode, Julia Louis-Dreyfus won the Primetime Emmy Award for Outstanding Lead Actress in a Comedy Series.
3	3	"Open Water"	Andy Ackerman	Adam Barr	March 20, 2006	2T7454	15.13
When Christine learns that her close friends, Barb and Pete, are responsible for introducing Richard to his "new" Christine, she allows them to set her up on a blind date of her own. After a series of unsuccessful dates, she finds the possibility of love in the strangest of places. Meanwhile, Matthew takes Richie to swimming lessons. Note: First appearance of Wanda Sykes as Barb
4	4	"One Toe Over the Line, Sweet Jesus"	Andy Ackerman	Adam Barr	March 27, 2006	2T7455	11.96
Richard learns from a gloating Matthew that Christine is out enjoying her fifth date with a new beau, Burton, so he does what any self-respecting ex-husband would do: he sabotages the happy couple's goodnight kiss and insults Burton with lawyer jokes. But when he tries to make it up to them by inviting Christine and Burton to dinner with him and "new" Christine, his best-laid plans go awry.
5	5	"I'll Show You Mine"	Andy Ackerman	Steve Baldikoski & Bryan Behar	April 3, 2006	2T7456	8.28
After 10 dates, Christine faces a critical moment in her relationship with Burton. Will she or won't she? Let him in the house, that is, to meet her son, Richie. She eventually relents, only to be thrown for a loop later.
6	6	"The Other F Word"	Andy Ackerman	Jeff Astrof	April 10, 2006	2T7461	11.42
Concerned about the uniformity of Richie's schoolmates, Christine takes it upon herself to help diversify the student body at his private school.
7	7	"Long Days Journey Into Stan"	Andy Ackerman	Danielle Evenson	April 17, 2006	2T7457	11.38
Following Christine's breakup with Burton, everyone expects Christine to fall apart emotionally, but she insists she is fine and looking forward to spending time with her best friend: "me". But after being humiliated while dining out alone, Christine realizes she really did care for Burton, which drives her even crazier.
8	8	"Teach Your Children Well"	Andy Ackerman	Katie Palmer	April 24, 2006	2T7458	11.81
Christine feels pressured to throw an extravagant party for Ritchie's 9th birthday, his first involving other children from his new private school. Recoiling from sticker shock after meeting with a ritzy event planner, Christine decides to have an arts and crafts party at her home, with mixed results.
9	9	"Ritchie Has Two Mommies"	Andy Ackerman	Kari Lizer	May 1, 2006	2T7451	11.92
Christine tries not to have a meltdown when her ex-husband brings his "new" Christine with him to pick up Richie and take him to breakfast so that they can get to know one another. By day's end, Christine tries to pull herself together to make a good impression at parents' night at Ritchie's school, but is caught off guard when "new" Christine shows up as well. Note: This episode aired out of order, as Ritchie had previously met New Christine
10	10	"No Fault Divorce"	Andy Ackerman	Jeff Astrof & Adam Barr & Kari Lizer	May 8, 2006	2T7459	11.87
Christine's former marriage counselor comes into the gym, leading to some awkward moments between the two women. When Christine mentions this to Richard, his cryptic reaction leads her to question whether it was in the counselor's best interest to encourage their divorce. Meanwhile, Matthew finds Christine's wedding video in a box of old photo albums, and Christine takes a trip down memory lane.
11	11	"Exile on Lame Street"	Andy Ackerman	Story by : Katie Palmer; Teleplay by : Steve Baldikoski & Bryan Behar	May 15, 2006	2T7460	11.44
Christine objects when Richard and "new" Christine want to take Richie to a Rolling Stones concert. Fearing that Ritchie is too young to be exposed to sex, drugs and rock and roll vices on display at a Rolling Stones concert, Christine initially forbids it. Eventually, she relents but immediately regrets her decision and, in a panic, goes to the venue with Matthew to see if she can sneak into the concert in order to keep tabs on Richie.
12	12	"Some of My Best Friends Are Portuguese"	Andy Ackerman	Story by : Katie Palmer; Teleplay by : Steve Baldikoski & Bryan Behar	May 22, 2006	2T7453	7.53
Shut out once again by the cliquey, judgmental moms at Ritchie's school, Christine runs into a down-to-earth working woman, Belinda, who invites her over for a drink after work. Belinda's job, however, isn't quite the type of position Christine expected her to hold, which throws yet another wrinkle in her attempt to fit in with the other school parents.
13	13	"A Fair to Remember: Part 1"	Andy Ackerman	Adam Barr & Kari Lizer	May 22, 2006	2T7462	13.06
Christine volunteers to help out at Ritchie's spring carnival and while there, she runs into the mean moms, who are clucking over the attractive father of a new student at Westbridge. Christine is excited to learn that the hot dad is her ex-boyfriend, Burton, but her hopes of re-igniting their romance are shot down when she learns Burton has a new girlfriend. To be continued...

== Ratings ==
No.	Title	Air Date	Rating/Share (18–49)	Viewers (millions)
1	Pilot	March 13, 2006	3.8/10	12.36
2	Supertramp	March 13, 2006	4.8/11	15.09
3	Open Water	March 20, 2006	5.1/12	15.13
4	One Toe Over the Line, Sweet Jesus	March 27, 2006		11.96
5	I'll Show You Mine	April 3, 2006		8.28
6	The Other F Word	April 10, 2006		11.42
7	Long Days Journey Into Stan	April 17, 2006		11.38
8	Teach Your Children Well	April 24, 2006		11.81
9	Ritchie Has Two Mommies	May 1, 2006		11.92
10	No Fault Divorce	May 8, 2006		11.87
11	Exile on Lame Street	May 15, 2006		11.44
12	Some of my Best Friends Are Portuguese	May 22, 2006		7.53
13	A Fair to Remember	May 22, 2006	4.5/10	13.06
