= The New Adventures of Old Christine season 4 =

The New Adventures of Old Christine
- Season 4
- DVD cover
- Starring: Julia Louis-Dreyfus; Clark Gregg; Hamish Linklater; Trevor Gagnon; Emily Rutherfurd; Tricia O'Kelley; Alex Kapp Horner; Wanda Sykes
- No. of episodes: 22

Release
- Original network: CBS
- Original release: September 24, 2008 – May 20, 2009

Season chronology
- ← Previous; Season 3 Next → Season 5

The fourth season of The New Adventures of Old Christine premiered on CBS on Wednesday nights at 8:00pm on September 24, 2008 and concluded on May 20, 2009. It consisted of 22 episodes.

In this season, Barb, who is divorced, faces deportation from the U.S. To help her, Christine decides to enter into a sham lesbian marriage with Barb to keep her best friend in the country. Meanwhile, Richard and New Christine become engaged, and Matthew finds love with one of his clients. Christine briefly dates an obsessive man named Patrick. Additionally, Christine and Barb convert their gym into a spa, only to discover it has unexpectedly become a brothel. On the day of Richard and New Christine's wedding, Christine briefly reconciles with New Christine's father but is later heartbroken to learn he is engaged to someone else. This leads Richard to rush to Christine's side, leaving New Christine angry and jealous, and ultimately causing her to leave him at the altar. Meanwhile, Barb and Christine's sham marriage is discovered by an INS officer, resulting in Barb's imprisonment.

== Cast and characters ==
=== Main ===
- Julia Louis-Dreyfus as "Old" Christine Campbell
- Clark Gregg as Richard Campbell
- Hamish Linklater as Matthew Kimble
- Trevor Gagnon as Ritchie Campbell
- Emily Rutherfurd as "New" Christine Hunter
- Tricia O'Kelley and Alex Kapp Horner as Marly and Lindsay (a.k.a. "The Meanie Moms")
- Wanda Sykes as Barbara 'Barb' Baran

=== Recurring ===
- Michaela Watkins as Lucy
- Lily Goff as Ashley Ehrhardt
- Marissa Blanchard as Kelsey

=== Guest stars ===
- Ernie Grunwald as Salesman
- Amy Farrington as Ali
- Mary Beth McDonough as Mrs. Wilhoite
- Jeffrey Tambor as Neil
- Tim DeKay as Patrick Harris
- Dan Gauthier as Brian
- Brenda Blethyn as Angela Kimble
- Megan Mullally as Margaret
- Lauren Bowles as Patty
- Bob Clendenin as Mr. Tuttle
- Lee Tergesen as Todd Watski
- Stephen Tobolowsky as Principal Merrow
- Charles Esten as Joe Campbell
- Crista Flanagan as Andrea
- Kristen Johnston as Francie
- Paula Newsome as Principal Slater
- Kathleen Wilhoite as Denise Sellick
- Constance Zimmer as Amy Hunter
- Scott Bakula as 'Papa' Jeff Hunter
- James Lesure as Dave

== Episodes ==
No. overall	No. in season	Title	Directed by	Written by	Original release date	Prod. code	US viewers (millions)
46	1	"A Decent Proposal"	Andy Ackerman	Kari Lizer & Jeff Astrof	September 24, 2008	3T7851	6.52
After her divorce from Pete is finalized, Barb learns her immigration status is in jeopardy and she may have to return to her homeland, the Bahamas, until she gets her paperwork straightened out. In order to solve Barb's immigration problem, Christine decides she and Barb should marry to keep Barb in the country. In the meantime, Richard has decided that he's ready to marry New Christine, but she refuses until he comes up with a proposal that's creative.
47	2	"How I Hate Your Mother"	Andy Ackerman	Katie Palmer	October 1, 2008	3T7852	6.80
Christine realizes she is in a really great place regarding Richard and New Christine's engagement, until Richard asks for his mother's engagement ring back. Christine refuses, until Richard offers to buy her a new ring. While they're shopping, Christine picks out a ring that Richard says New Christine would love. When Christine realizes that the only reason Richard is giving New Christine the old ring is to please his mother, she tries to talk some sense into him. Matthew has his first client, a very attractive young woman whose problem is that she wants to kiss anyone who seems to have a lot of knowledge (guest star Michaela Watkins). This ends up including Matthew.
48	3	"White Like Me"	Andy Ackerman	Lew Schneider	October 8, 2008	3T7855	7.53
Barb is profiled in a local black business owner's magazine, and it brings a ton of new business to the gym, most of which are black women. All of a sudden, Christine doesn't feel so comfortable in her own gym, but Ali (guest star Amy Farrington) fits into the new environment. She wonders if Barb understands what it's like to feel different from everyone else, leading Christine to realize that maybe she's a little bit racist after all. Because things are so busy at the gym, Christine has Richard and Matthew look after Ritchie. She gives them lots of instructions, but they're dismissive and end up losing Ritchie. Christine then tries to get some white people in the gym, like Marly, Lindsay and Mrs. Wilhoite (guest star Mary Beth McDonough) to integrate the gym.
49	4	"Snakes on a Date"	Andy Ackerman	Lew Schneider	October 15, 2008	3T7853	7.61
Christine has been burning the candle at both ends -- working hard and trying to be a good mom. Ritchie decides he wants to join the reptile club at school and tells Christine all she needs to do is get the permission slip in on time. When Christine realizes that she's forgotten yet again, she asks the Reptile Guy (guest star Jeffrey Tambor) to make an exception. He says the only way he'll consider is if Christine will go on a date with him. As creepy as he is, Christine is determined not to let Ritchie down, and so she complies. Meanwhile Matthew develops his relationship with Lucy.
50	5	"Everyone Says I Love Except Ritchie"	Andy Ackerman	Jackie Filgo & Jeff Filgo	October 22, 2008	3T7856	7.76
Christine is distraught when Ritchie stops saying "I love you" to her. When she reveals her distress to Matthew, she also admits that she's been sleeping in Ritchie's room every night. Matthew tells her that if she's not careful, Ritchie will end up like him -- he can't go to sleep without talking to their mother. They spend the night helping each other break these habits. Christine asks Richard to make her another baby which instills extreme jealousy in New Christine, who continually trials Richard by comparing his value of her and Old Christine. Note: Julia Louis-Dreyfus submitted this episode for consideration due to her nomination for the Primetime Emmy Award for Outstanding Lead Actress in a Comedy Series at the 61st Primetime Emmy Awards.
51	6	"Tie Me Up, Don't Tie Me Down"	Andy Ackerman	Sherry Bilsing-Graham & Ellen Kreamer	October 29, 2008	3T7857	7.61
Barb and Christine meet two cute guys in the video store and end up going on a double date with them. Barb is concerned with how quickly Christine seems to get attached and coaches her on how to be cool and just have fun for the night. But when Barb gets a call from her date (guest star Dan Gauthier) to go out again and Barb reveals that she thinks he might be the one, Christine feels cheated by Barb's advice when she doesn't get a call from hers (guest star Tim DeKay). Richard drags Matthew chair shopping for the wedding and panics about settling down with just one chair.
52	7	"So You Think You Can Date"	Andy Ackerman	Sherry Bilsing-Graham & Ellen Kreamer	November 5, 2008	3T7858	6.50
Christine and Patrick have been dating for a little while and everything seems to be going really well. Patrick has even accepted Richard's constant presence in Christine's life. Her new attitude is take it or leave it, and Patrick has decided to "take it." But when Christine invites Richard to join them on an intimate date and Patrick is left out, Patrick isn't quite as thrilled and it looks like he might leave it. Barb tells Matthew a "secret" that he can't tell anyone because he is her psychologist, but eventually cracks.
53	8	"Self-Esteem Tempura"	Andy Ackerman	Jeff Astrof	November 12, 2008	3T7854	6.82
Christine is thrilled when a talent scout recruits Ritchie to audition for a television commercial after his shockingly great performance in a school play, but Richard refuses to let him go.
54	9	"Rage Against the Christine"	Andy Ackerman	Kari Lizer & Jeff Astrof	November 19, 2008	3T7859	7.85
Christine and Patrick are going strong. She's convinced she's found the perfect man until he loses to her in a friendly game of tennis. While Christine knows she might not be the best winner, she is shocked by the way Patrick behaves when he loses. In order to prove to her friends that it's not the result of her rubbing her winning in Patrick's face, she plans a game night and arranges for Patrick to lose. Matthew freaks out when people start telling him his girlfriend, Lucy, is exactly like Christine.
55	10	"Guess Who's Not Coming to Dinner"	Andy Ackerman	Lew Schneider & Katie Palmer	November 26, 2008	3T7861	7.48
Everyone goes to Christine and Matthew's parents for Thanksgiving, a trip Christine always looks forward to given her mom's proclivity for giving her a hard time about her divorce. But when they arrive, they realize something is off. Their mom (guest star Brenda Blethyn) is acting weird and Christine's father is nowhere to be found. They initially suspect their mother killed him and hid the body, but then learn their parents have split and their mother was too embarrassed to admit it -- especially after giving Christine such a hard time about her situation. Lucy learns about Matthew's teenage years but responds positively.
56	11	"Unidentified Funk" (Part 1)	Andy Ackerman	Frank Pines	December 10, 2008	3T7862	7.94
The Bloom Gym franchise organization owner Margaret (special guest star Megan Mullally) comes to check in on how Christine and Barb's gym is doing. When they reveal their marriage to her, she tells them it's against the rules of the company and shuts them down. But when Christine explains her marriage to her she is very disturbed by the things she discovers about her and the company. New Christine and Richard decide they don't want to have any children. Richard agrees to get a vasectomy but can't go through with it and refuses to tell New Christine, and continues to become intimate with her despite the consequences. In this Megan and Julia's characters share a weird kiss, afterwards Megan's character explaining that she's not gay and is married with kids and called it "The Cleveland Welcome".
57	12	"Happy Endings" (Part 2)	Andy Ackerman	Jackie Filgo & Jeff Filgo	December 17, 2008	3T7860	7.29
Having been stripped of their franchise, Christine and Barb decide to turn the gym into a spa. They are overjoyed by how quickly their new business has become a success -- until they find out Matthew informs them that they're actually running a brothel. Christine, in an effort to reopen a new gym following this, asks Marly and Lindsay for an investment. Richard experiences mothers (guest stars Mary McDonough and Lauren Bowles) at Ritchie's school for the first time when Christine has to work on the gym and realizes that Christine may have been right about their behavior.
58	13	"Notes on a 7th Grade Scandal"	Andy Ackerman	Allan Rice	January 14, 2009	3T7863	7.18
Christine tries to make a good impression at Ritchie's Junior High Parents Orientation, but when she recognizes one of the fathers there as the boy who wronged her in junior high (guest star Lee Tergesen), she reverts to seventh grade behavior. and does not make herself look like the parent she has been trying to be. Meanwhile, New Christine becomes fascinated at Barb's ability to speak her mind.
59	14	"What Happens in Vegas is Disgusting in Vegas"	Andy Ackerman	Sherry Bilsing-Graham & Ellen Kreamer	January 21, 2009	3T7864	7.29
While Matthew plans a stellar bachelor party for Richard, New Christine insists she was content with her office bachelorette which consisted of a coffee break at the downstairs shop. Barb convinces Christine that they should take New Christine to Vegas for a proper bachelorette where she tries tequila (and many other things) for the first time. Richard's brother (guest star Charles Esten) comes in for his bachelor party and is totally insulted that Richard has asked Matthew to be his best man.
60	15	"Reckless Abandonment"	Andy Ackerman	Jeff Astrof	February 11, 2009	3T7865	6.67
Barb has found a new condo to live in and Matthew is moving in with Lucy, leaving Christine on her own (Ritchie is going away to camp for a week) for the first time. Christine feels abandoned but puts on a brave face; unfortunately, she locks herself out and gets her foot stuck in the toilet when she climbs in the bathroom window. Unable to free herself, she remembers a time when she was fiercely independent. When Richard and Barb find her, she's despondent, but her memory of her more independent days (and their teasing) inspire her to figure out how to get unstuck. Matthew's relationship with Lucy is quickly tested when they move in together: her bizarre relationship with her dog and her obsession with how much space Matthew takes up makes them realize they can't be together. Matthew moves home and Christine is no longer alone.
61	16	"Honey, I Ran Over the Kid"	Andy Ackerman	Sherry Bilsing-Graham & Ellen Plummer	February 18, 2009	3T7867	6.72
Christine gets angry with Richard when Ritchie gets injured at a skateboarding party. It makes her even more overprotective, and, in doing so, Christine accidentally runs over Ritchie while he's riding his bike. Ritchie is unhurt, but Christine and Richard argue over who is the worst parent. They finally realize they've actually done a pretty good job. Matthew dates the lunch lady from Ritchie's school (guest star Crista Flanagan). She's very boring, and he's insulted when she breaks up with him because he talks about his ex-girlfriend Lucy all the time.
62	17	"Too Close for Christine"	Andy Ackerman	Amy Iglow	March 11, 2009	3T7866	7.46
Ritchie makes a new friend at school and invites him on a play date. He shows up with his mother, Francie (guest star Kristen Johnston), and Christine has to entertain her. Francie very quickly becomes relentlessly dependent on Christine, but Christine doesn't mind: Barb told Christine she 'needed a break' because Christine is too needy and Christine is enjoying being on the other side. It all gets to be too much when Francie asks Christine to give the eulogy at her grandmother's funeral. What does Christine do? She asks Barb to give the eulogy. Matthew moves in with New Christine and Richard while the heater in his room is being fixed. It starts off well, but it turns out New Christine is a perfectionist when it comes to homemaking and Matthew can't quite live up to all the rules.
63	18	"A Change of Heart/Pants"	Andy Ackerman	Lew Schneider & Frank Pines	March 18, 2009	3T7868	7.21
Christine and the meanie moms are escorting the students on a field trip to the planetarium when Marley and Lindsay's water breaks. Christine takes them to the hospital, then tries to leave, but they insist she stay because she's their friend. The meanie moms are quite demanding, and Christine gets overwhelmed helping them so she calls Matthew. Matthew is tuxedo shopping with Richard, so he brings him to the hospital. Matthew can't handle them either, so Richard offers. Christine points out how useless he was when she was in labor, but he remembers things differently. Turns out, he's great with the meanie moms and Christine falls a little in love with Richard all over again. Richard feels the same way, but Matthew figures out a way to put an end to their renewed love.
64	19	"Hair"	Andy Ackerman	Matt Goldman	April 8, 2009	3T7871	7.17
Ritchie is excited when he's sent home from school because he has lice, however, Christine is furious. Christine decides to pull Ritchie from the school and send him to the local public school. Unfortunately, because it's a charter school, he has to be admitted. When the family shows up, they look like the Addams family in front of the principal (guest star Paula Newsome) because of their hair treatment for lice. They don't get into the school and Christine has to return to the private school and eat crow to the Principal (guest star Stephen Tobolowsky) in order to get Ritchie readmitted.
65	20	"He Ain't Heavy"	Andy Ackerman	Sherry Bilsing-Graham	May 6, 2009	3T7872	6.45
When Matthew complains that his pants are too tight, he realizes he's gained a little weight and Christine offers to train him. Turns out her "protein shakes" were high calorie milkshakes and they've both gained weight. Barb volunteers to train them at her gym: a sweaty, smelly boxing gym. Christine has her butts to work off and Matthew does next to nothing, yet he loses tons of weight and Christine almost none. Also, Richard makes a point of talking to Ritchie in front of the meanie moms, asking Ritchie if he's okay with Richard's impending marriage. When Ritchie says no, Richard is flummoxed as to how to handle the situation.
66	21	"The Old Maid Honor"	Andy Ackerman	Kari Lizer & Jeff Astrof	May 13, 2009	3T7869	6.50
It's the rehearsal dinner and Christine is excited for "her big day". She has what she thinks is an hilarious speech and gets New Christine all charged up to hear it. Richard is concerned that she'll be upset because he's moving on and she's alone, but Christine insists she's fine. She's invited Todd Watsky to be her date and the more Richard expresses concern the more she inflates their relationship. Todd Watsky turns out to be a jackass, and walks away when he realizes Christine was using him to make Richard jealous. Barb consoles Christine and ultimately Christine realizes she is upset about Richard moving on, but is genuinely happy for him and New Christine. Matthew meets New Christine's sister Amy (guest star Constance Zimmer) and they end up hooking up at the rehearsal dinner.
67	22	"Love: A Cautionary Tale" (Part 1)	Andy Ackerman	Jeff Astrof & Kari Lizer	May 20, 2009	3T7870	5.55
Christine is in a relatively good place about Richard and New Christine's wedding. At the church, she keeps referring to herself as a cautionary tale, as Matthew expresses his new-found love for New Christine's sister, Amy, and Barb seems to be connecting with another wedding guest (guest star James Lesure). However, when she sees Papa Jeff (New Christine's father), she realizes she still has feelings for him and decides to pursue it, making out with him in the rectory. There's a moment where Christine, Barb and Matthew are over-the-moon with excitement as they realize they're all "in love". Things quickly fall apart as Matthew learns Amy's just interested in a wedding hookup, Barb tells her story to her new beau only to learn he's an INS officer who arrests her and Christine learns that Papa Jeff is engaged to a very young woman (guest star Debra Azar). Richard steps in to make sure Christine is okay which makes New Christine extremely angry. As the wedding processional begins, Richard is left at the altar. Scott Bakula guest stars as Jeff, Old Christine's ex-boyfriend and New Christine's father.

== Ratings ==
No.	Title	Air Date	Rating/Share (18–49)	Viewers (millions)
1	A Decent Proposal	September 24, 2008	2.1/6	6.52
2	How I Hate Your Mother	October 1, 2008	2.0/6	6.80
3	White Like Me	October 8, 2008	2.2/7	7.53
4	Snakes on a Date	October 15, 2008	2.2/6	7.61
5	Everyone Says I Love You Except Ritchie	October 22, 2008	2.4/7	7.76
6	Tie Me Up, Don't Tie Me Down	October 29, 2008		7.61
7	So You Think You Can Date	November 5, 2008		6.50
8	Self-Esteem Tempura	November 12, 2008		6.82
9	Rage Against the Christine	November 19, 2008	2.4/7	7.85
10	Guess Who's Not Coming to Dinner	November 26, 2008		7.48
11	Unidentified Funk	December 10, 2008	2.2/7	7.94
12	Happy Endings	December 17, 2008	2.0/6	7.29
13	Notes on a 7th Grade Scandal	January 14, 2009	1.9/5	7.18
14	What Happens in Vegas is Disgusting in Vegas	January 21, 2009	2.1/6	7.29
15	Reckless Abandonment	February 11, 2009		6.67
16	Honey, I Ran Over the Kid	February 18, 2009	1.8/5	6.72
17	Too Close for Christine	March 11, 2009	2.1/6	7.46
18	A Change of Heart/Pants	March 18, 2009	2.1/7	7.21
19	Hair	April 8, 2009		7.17
20	He Ain't Heavy	May 6, 2009	1.9/6	6.45
21	The Old Maid of Honor	May 13, 2009	2.0/6	6.50
22	Love: A Cautionary Tale	May 20, 2009	1.6/5	5.55
