= The New Adventures of Old Christine season 3 =

The New Adventures of Old Christine
- Season 3
- DVD cover
- Starring: Julia Louis-Dreyfus; Clark Gregg; Hamish Linklater; Trevor Gagnon; Emily Rutherfurd; Tricia O'Kelley; Alex Kapp Horner; Wanda Sykes
- No. of episodes: 10

Release
- Original network: CBS
- Original release: February 4 – March 31, 2008

Season chronology
- ← Previous; Season 2 Next → Season 4

The third season of The New Adventures of Old Christine premiered on CBS on Monday nights from 9:30/8:30 pm from February 4, 2008 and concluded on March 31, 2008. It was the last season to air on Monday nights. It was originally intended to have 13 episodes, since CBS scheduled the series as a midseason replacement, but due to the Writer's Strike, it was shortened to 10 episodes. It is the shortest season of the series.

In this season, Christine and Mr. Harris have a smooth going relationship, until Christine's schedule becomes too hectic midway through the season causing Mr. Harris to leave her. Meanwhile, Richard and New Christine take their relationship up a notch and buy a house together, which coincidentally is Christine's dream house leaving her feeling jealous and confused. Barb leaves her husband and she has a short-lived fling with Matthew much to Christine's horror. On August 13, 2008, CBS announced that the series will be moving to Wednesday nights after Summer 2008, after Welcome to The Captain's cancellation.

This season marks the reunion between Julia Louis-Dreyfus and Jason Alexander, who previously worked together on Seinfeld.

Wanda Sykes, who plays the role of Barb, was upgraded to series regular status for this season.

== Cast and characters ==
=== Main ===
- Julia Louis-Dreyfus as "Old" Christine Campbell
- Clark Gregg as Richard Campbell
- Hamish Linklater as Matthew Kimble
- Trevor Gagnon as Ritchie Campbell
- Emily Rutherfurd as "New" Christine Hunter
- Tricia O'Kelley and Alex Kapp Horner as Marly and Lindsay (a.k.a. "The Meanie Moms")
- Wanda Sykes as Barbara 'Barb' Baran

=== Recurring ===
- Blair Underwood as Daniel Harris
- Lily Goff as Ashley Ehrhardt
- Marissa Blanchard as Kelsey

=== Guest stars ===
- Andy Richter as Stan
- Tom Papa as Mike Gay
- Mary Beth McDonough as Mrs. Wilhoite
- Stephanie Faracy as Dr. Jacobson
- Ben Feldman as Timmy
- Gigi Rice as Shelley
- Dave Foley as Tom
- Jason Alexander as Dr. Palmer

== Episodes ==
| No. overall | No. in season | Title | Directed by | Written by | Original release date | Prod. code | US viewers (millions) |
|---|---|---|---|---|---|---|---|
| 36 | 1 | "The Big Bang" | Andy Ackerman | Kari Lizer & Jeff Astrof | February 4, 2008 | 3T6701 | 9.43 |
After waiting to consummate her relationship with Mr. Harris, Christine is finally ready-until Barb gives her reason to worry, and Matthew rethinks med school after discovering that his assigned cadaver is a former neighbor.
| 37 | 2 | "Beauty is Only Spanx Deep" | Andy Ackerman | Kari Lizer | February 11, 2008 | 3T6702 | 9.90 |
After a pretty young waitress flirts with Mr. Harris Christine gets insecure and considers plastic surgery. Christine considers having plastic surgery, because she's afraid that she's dating out of her league.
| 38 | 3 | "Popular" | Andy Ackerman | Jennifer Crittenden | February 18, 2008 | 3T6703 | 9.40 |
After Christine finds out that she hasn't been invited to any of the Meanie Moms' school-related social events, she changes her ways to get in tighter with them.
| 39 | 4 | "Traffic" | Andy Ackerman | Jeff Astrof | February 25, 2008 | 3T6705 | 9.15 |
Christine's relationship with Mr. Harris is on the ropes because she is just too busy with her life to make time for him.
| 40 | 5 | "Between a Rock and a Hard Place" | Andy Ackerman | Aaron Shure | March 3, 2008 | 3T6704 | 8.35 |
Christine declares that she's over her breakup with Mr. Harris, but she has a relapse at one of Richie's parties. Meanwhile, a therapist tells Matthew that he is having an inappropriate relationship with Christine.
| 41 | 6 | "The New Adventures of Old Christine" | Andy Ackerman | Frank Pines | March 10, 2008 | 3T6706 | 7.38 |
Still trying to get over being sad about her recent return to single-hood, Christine reluctantly lets New Christine set her up on a blind date, but the date goes from bad to worse as Christine discovers he is not who he made himself out to be.
| 42 | 7 | "House" | Andy Ackerman | Katie Palmer | March 10, 2008 | 3T6707 | 9.62 |
When Christine learns that Richard and New Christine bought the house she had always dreamed of, she tries to contain her jealousy and attempts to feel genuinely happy for them.
| 43 | 8 | "Burning Down the House"(Part 1) | Andy Ackerman | Aaron Shure | March 17, 2008 | 3T6708 | 11.47 |
Christine considers taking a walk on the wild side in order to make Barb think she's not a square. Dave Foley (NewsRadio) returns to guest star as Richard's friend, Tom, with whom Christine once went on a date.
| 44 | 9 | "The Happy Couple"(Part 2) | Andy Ackerman | Jennifer Crittenden | March 24, 2008 | 3T6709 | 9.77 |
Matthew and Barb pretend to be inseparable after Christine learns they spent the night together and forbids them to see one another.
| 45 | 10 | "One and a Half Men" | Andy Ackerman | Story by : Allan Rice & Amy Iglow; Teleplay by : Lew Schneider | March 31, 2008 | 3T6710 | 12.57 |
When Christine's gynecologist suggests that her flu-like symptoms may be her experiencing perimenopause, Christine tries to take charge of her hormones. Note: Julia Louis-Dreyfus submitted this episode for consideration due to her nomination for the Primetime Emmy Award for Outstanding Lead Actress in a Comedy Series at the 60th Primetime Emmy Awards.

== Ratings ==
| No. | Title | Air Date | Rating/Share (18–49) | Viewers (millions) |
|---|---|---|---|---|
| 1 | The Big Bang | February 4, 2008 | 3.2/8 | 9.43 |
| 2 | Beauty is Only Spanx Deep | February 11, 2008 | 3.3/8 | 9.89 |
| 3 | Popular | February 18, 2008 | | 9.40 |
| 4 | Traffic | February 25, 2008 | | 9.15 |
| 5 | Between a Rock and a Hard Place | March 3, 2008 | | 8.35 |
| 6 | The New Adventures of Old Christine | March 10, 2008 | 2.7/7 | 7.38 |
| 7 | House | March 10, 2008 | 3.2/8 | 9.62 |
| 8 | Burning Down the House | March 17, 2008 | 4.3/11 | 11.47 |
| 9 | The Happy Couple | March 24, 2008 | 3.8/9 | 9.77 |
| 10 | One and a Half Men | March 31, 2008 | 4.5/11 | 12.57 |
