= The New Adventures of Old Christine season 2 =

The New Adventures of Old Christine
- Season 2
- DVD cover
- Starring: Julia Louis-Dreyfus; Clark Gregg; Hamish Linklater; Trevor Gagnon; Emily Rutherfurd; Tricia O'Kelley; Alex Kapp Horner
- No. of episodes: 22

Release
- Original network: CBS
- Original release: September 18, 2006 – May 7, 2007

Season chronology
- ← Previous; Season 1 Next → Season 3

The second season of The New Adventures of Old Christine premiered on CBS on Monday nights from 9:30/8:30/8:00 pm from September 18, 2006 and concluded on May 7, 2007. It consisted of 22 episodes.

In this season, due to Richard and Christine's brief kiss, Richie believes that his parents have gotten back together much to his parents' dismay. Christine starts dating an older man who she later discovers is New Christine's father, this situation causes Richard and New Christine to rekindle their romance once again. Barb decides to start working at the gym with Christine, while Christine falls hard for Richie's new teacher, Mr. Harris. The season finale included Richard sleeping with Christine after breaking up with New Christine yet again. This causes a pregnancy scare for Christine which is soon avoided. Eventually, New Christine takes Richard back and Mr. Harris takes a new teaching job at another school to be with Christine.

== Cast and characters ==
=== Main ===
- Julia Louis-Dreyfus as "Old" Christine Campbell
- Clark Gregg as Richard Campbell
- Hamish Linklater as Matthew Kimble
- Trevor Gagnon as Ritchie Campbell
- Emily Rutherfurd as "New" Christine Hunter
- Tricia O'Kelley and Alex Kapp Horner as Marly and Lindsay (a.k.a. "The Meanie Moms")

=== Recurring ===
- Wanda Sykes as Barbara 'Barb' Baran
- Blair Underwood as Daniel Harris
- Lily Goff as Ashley Ehrhardt
- Marissa Blanchard as Kelsey

=== Guest stars ===
- Scott Bakula as 'Papa' Jeff Hunter
- Nancy Lenehan as Mrs. Marcie Nunley
- Ed Begley, Jr. as Pastor Ed
- Mary Gross as Mrs. Orr
- Andy Richter as Stan
- Mary Beth McDonough as Mrs. Wilhoite
- Amy Farrington as Ali
- Don Lake as Carl
- Matt Letscher as Burton Shaffer
- Tim Bagley as Dr. Mike
- Charles Esten as Joe Campbell
- Sandra Bernhard as Audrey
- Patrick Breen as Edmund
- Jane Lynch as Coach Hammond
- Dave Foley as Tom
- Matthew Glave as Ben
- Rachael Harris as Claire

== Episodes ==
No. overall	No. in season	Title	Directed by	Written by	Original release date	Prod. code	US viewers (millions)
14	1	"The Passion Of Christine: Part 2" (Part 2)	Andy Ackerman	Kari Lizer	September 18, 2006	3T5551	12.01
Since New Christine broke up with Richard, he's been spending a lot of time at Old Christine's house, leading Ritchie to believe that his parents are back together. When Christine tells Richard that Ritchie told this to his new teacher, Mr. Harris (Blair Underwood), Richard suggests that they give their relationship another try.
15	2	"The Answer is Maybe: Part 1"	Andy Ackerman	Adam Barr	September 25, 2006	3T5552	12.19
Richard tells Christine that the reason he has good luck with women is that he "says yes to life." When Christine meets a good-looking man (special guest star Scott Bakula) after paying a surprise visit to New Christine, she decides to break out of her mold and says yes when he asks her out to dinner.
16	3	"Come to Papa Jeff: Part 2"	Andy Ackerman	Jeff Astrof	October 2, 2006	3T5553	13.59
Christine tries to determine whether it is ethical to date Jeff. Christine is later horrified when she's convinced to take New Christine's father as Ritchie's grandfather to 'Grandparents Day'.
17	4	"Oh God, Yes"	Andy Ackerman	Jennifer Crittenden	October 9, 2006	3T5554	12.88
Ritchie goes to church with Richard and new Christine without consulting his mother first, leaving old Christine to explain and explore her aversion to organized religion.
18	5	"Separation Anxiety"	Andy Ackerman	Danielle Evenson	October 16, 2006	3T5555	13.03
Barb moves in with Christine after deciding to divorce her husband. This forces Matthew into Ritchie's room, where he discovers his nephew has some odd habits.
19	6	"The Champ"	Andy Ackerman	Kari Lizer & Adam Barr	October 23, 2006	3T5556	12.10
Christine runs into Stan again and is unable to resist him, despite her best efforts. She asks Matthew to help keep Stan away from her, but her brother is having attraction issues of his own--his latest girlfriend refuses to leave.
20	7	"Playdate with Destiny"	Andy Ackerman	Jennifer Crittenden	November 6, 2006	3T5557	11.47
Christine's attraction to the handsome Mr. Harris causes a scene at a school fund-raiser--especially after she wins a playdate with him. Note: Julia Louis-Dreyfus submitted this episode for consideration due to her nomination for the Primetime Emmy Award for Outstanding Lead Actress in a Comedy Series at the 59th Primetime Emmy Awards.
21	8	"Women 'N Tuition"	Andy Ackerman	Jeff Astrof	November 13, 2006	3T5559	11.87
Christine has money problems and tries to get help from everyone except the person offering it freely: Barb. Meanwhile, Matthew gets a video message from his past and decides it's time to make something of himself.
22	9	"Mission: Impossible"	Andy Ackerman	Jonathan Goldstein	November 20, 2006	3T5558	11.48
Christine struggles over what to do when Ritchie does a bad job on an important homework assignment that will be put on display at his school.
23	10	"What About Barb?"	Andy Ackerman	Story by : Katie Palmer & Kari Lizer; Teleplay by : Steve Baldikoski & Bryan Behar	November 27, 2006	3T5560	12.01
Christine has trouble working with Barb at the gym and feels pressure at home to find a nanny for Ritchie when Richard is unavailable to care for him due to a trip with new Christine.
24	11	"Crash"	Andy Ackerman	Adam Barr	December 11, 2006	3T5561	11.96
Christine's Prius is damaged in an accident with Marly's Hummer and they argue over who is responsible, but Christine is more upset when the only rental car available is a large, luxury gas-guzzler.
25	12	"Ritchie Scores"	Andy Ackerman	Frank Pines	January 8, 2007	3T5563	12.08
Mr. Harris suggests that Ritchie join the soccer team to improve his social skills and make friends. Christine is against the idea, but Richard is all for it until Ritchie brings home his new friends: three girls. Meanwhile Christine and Richard compete for Mr. Harris' attention.
26	13	"Endless Shrimp, Endless Night"	Andy Ackerman	Katie Palmer	January 15, 2007	3T5562	9.40
Richard tries to make Ritchie take an interest in his work, while Christine attempts to take an interest in her brother's life. She attends a party with him, where she runs into one of Matthew's former girlfriends and tries to help get them back together, even though he asked her not to.
27	14	"Let Him Eat Cake"	Andy Ackerman	Jonathan Goldstein	January 22, 2007	3T5564	12.81
After helping New Christine to come up with an idea for Richard's birthday present, Christine takes credit for this idea herself. As payback New Christine bakes her own cake knowing that it was Christine's tradition to do so.
28	15	"Sleepless in Mar Vista"	Andy Ackerman	Story by : Allan Rice; Teleplay by : Danielle Evenson	March 12, 2007	3T5565	7.59
After taking some new sleeping pills, Christine wakes up to discover she made several embarrassing phone calls while knocked out.
29	16	"Undercover Brother"	Andy Ackerman	Katie Palmer	March 12, 2007	3T5566	8.34
After sleeping with Richard's wildly attractive brother, Christine learns an astonishing secret.
30	17	"Strange Bedfellows"	Andy Ackerman	Kari Lizer	March 19, 2007	3T5567	6.74
Richard is shocked to learn of Matt and Barb's short fling in the past, and must share an embarrassing secret with them. Christine becomes obsessed with becoming politically active to set a good example for Richie.
31	18	"The Real Thing"	Andy Ackerman	Story by : Charles Zucker; Teleplay by : Jeff Astrof & Danielle Evenson	April 9, 2007	3T5568	7.69
Christine almost gets Mr. Harris fired after unintentionally sending all the parents at Ritchie's school an email revealing that their parent/teacher relationship may be something more. While Christine and Mr. Harris are being reprimanded by the head of the school ethics committee, Christine gets some surprising news from Mr. Harris.
32	19	"Faith Off"	Andy Ackerman	Adam Barr	April 16, 2007	3T5569	6.99
When Christine learns that Richard has been hired to remodel "meanie mom" Lindsay's bathroom, she can't help but intervene and make sure he doesn't screw up the job and risk their reputation at Ritchie's school. Additionally, she and Richard are at odds over which of them gets to be the one to give Ritchie the sex talk.
33	20	"My Big Fat Sober Wedding"	Andy Ackerman	Jonathan Goldstein & Katie Palmer	April 23, 2007	3T5570	6.88
The stresses of going to a wedding with Richard and Barb are multiplied by Christine's agreeing to be designated driver, depriving her of some much-needed alcohol.
34	21	"Friends"	Andy Ackerman	Jennifer Crittenden & Kari Lizer	April 30, 2007	3T5571	7.32
On their way to Ritchie's desert camping trip, Christine, Richard, Matthew, and Barb stay at a seedy motel and get on each others' nerves.
35	22	"Frasier"	Andy Ackerman	Jeff Astrof & Adam Barr	May 7, 2007	3T5572	7.82
Christine realizes that one reckless evening may have jeopardized her chance to begin dating Mr. Harris.

== Ratings ==
No.	Title	Air Date	Rating/Share (18–49)	Viewers (millions)
1	The Passion Of Christine	September 18, 2006	4.2/10	12.01
2	The Answer is Maybe	October 2, 2006	3.8/9	12.19
3	Come to Papa Jeff	October 2, 2006	4.5/11	13.59
4	Oh God, Yes	October 9, 2006	4.1/10	12.88
5	Separation Anxiety	October 16, 2006	4.2/10	13.03
6	The Champ	October 23, 2006		12.10
7	Playdate with Destiny	November 6, 2006	3.7/9	11.47
8	Women 'N Tuition	November 13, 2006		11.87
9	Mission: Impossible	November 20, 2006		11.48
10	What About Barb?	November 27, 2006		12.01
11	Crash	December 11, 2006	4.1/10	11.96
12	Ritchie Scores	January 8, 2007		12.08
13	Endless Shrimp, Endless Night	January 15, 2007		9.40
14	Let Him Eat Cake	January 22, 2007	4.1/9	12.81
15	Sleepless in Mar Vista	March 12, 2007		7.59
16	Undercover Brother	March 12, 2007		8.34
17	Strange Bedfellows	March 19, 2007		6.74
18	The Real Thing	April 9, 2007		7.69
19	Faith Off	April 16, 2007		6.99
20	My Big Fat Sober Wedding	April 23, 2007		6.88
21	Friends	April 30, 2007		7.32
22	Frasier	May 7, 2007		7.82
