= The New Adventures of Old Christine season 5 =

The New Adventures of Old Christine
- Season 5
- DVD cover
- Starring: Julia Louis-Dreyfus; Clark Gregg; Hamish Linklater; Trevor Gagnon; Emily Rutherfurd; Tricia O'Kelley; Alex Kapp Horner; Wanda Sykes
- No. of episodes: 21

Release
- Original network: CBS
- Original release: September 23, 2009 – May 12, 2010

Season chronology
- ← Previous; Season 4

The fifth and final season of The New Adventures of Old Christine was renewed on April 22, 2009 and announcing in May to be the final season that premiered on CBS on Wednesday nights at 8:00 PM on September 23, 2009 and concluded on May 12, 2010. It consisted of 21 episodes.

In this season, following Barb's arrest she is rescued by Christine, Matthew and new boyfriend Dave. While Richard tries to win New Christine back, he temporarily moves into a new apartment with Matthew. Christine begins going to therapy, but she is attracted to her therapist, Max. They eventually abandon Christine's therapy and strike up a relationship instead. New Christine announces that she is pregnant, causing Richard to rekindle his relationship with her and New Christine eventually gives birth to a baby girl. Meanwhile, Barb becomes engaged to a reluctant Dave. At the conclusion of the season, Christine also becomes engaged to Max, but she feels intimidated by his very educated friends so she decides to return to college. On May 18, 2010, CBS announced that the series would not be brought back for a 6th season.

This season earned two Emmy Award nominations: one for Outstanding Lead Actress in a Comedy Series for Louis-Dreyfus, and one for Outstanding Art Direction for a Multi-Camera Series.

== Cancellation ==
The early ratings for the fifth season were lower than previous seasons, but the 14th episode of the season reached 8.3 million viewers, the highest viewership the show had received in the Wednesday night timeslot. While the future of the show was uncertain at CBS, ABC had shown interest in the series on several occasions, and on May 3, 2010, Deadline Hollywood reported that ABC was in negotiations with Warner Bros. to pick up Old Christine, should CBS cancel it. On May 18, 2010, CBS canceled Old Christine. There was speculation that ABC would pick up the show, but the negotiations between Warner Brothers and ABC were slow. In June 2010, Deadline Hollywood reported that ABC were no longer interested in picking up the show. Upon CBS cancelling the show, creator Kari Lizer slammed the network and suggested the decision to cancel the show was sexist.

== Cast and characters ==
=== Main ===
- Julia Louis-Dreyfus as "Old" Christine Campbell
- Clark Gregg as Richard Campbell
- Hamish Linklater as Matthew Kimble
- Trevor Gagnon as Ritchie Campbell
- Emily Rutherfurd as "New" Christine Hunter
- Tricia O'Kelley and Alex Kapp Horner as Marly Ehrhardt and Lindsay (a.k.a. "The Meanie Moms")
- Wanda Sykes as Barbara 'Barb' Baran

=== Recurring ===
- Eric McCormack as Dr. Max Kershaw
- Lily Goff as Ashley Ehrhardt
- Marissa Blanchard as Kelsey

=== Guest stars ===
- James Lesure as Dave
- Dave Florek as The Douch
- Jeanette O'Connor as Candy
- Wayne Nickel as Larry
- Christopher Gartin as Glenn
- Corbin Bernsen as Howard
- Marion Ross as Agnes
- Stefanie Scott as Britney Burke
- Mary Beth McDonough as Mrs. Wilhoite
- Rachel G. Fox as Gretchen
- Dave Foley as Tom
- Jennifer Grey as Tracy
- Michaela Watkins as Lucy
- Nancy Lenehan as Principal Marcie Nunley
- Amy Sedaris as Frances Stein
- Molly Shannon as Jeannie
- Katie Walder as Hannah
- Adrienne Barbeau as herself
- Blair Underwood as Daniel Harris
- Clea Lewis as Emily
- Tim Meadows as Dr. Volk
- Ed Begley, Jr. as Pastor Ed
- Ashley Williams as Amy
- Jim Meskimen as Bernie
- Scott Bakula as 'Papa' Jeff Hunter
- Joel McKinnon Miller as Officer Dutton
- Jeff Witzke as Frank
- Julia Lehman as Heidi
- Josh Randall as Officer Johnson
- Beth Littleford as Tony Kershaw

== Episodes ==
No. overall	No. in season	Title	Directed by	Written by	Original release date	Prod. code	US viewers (millions)
68	1	"Bahamian Rhapsody" (Part 2)	Andy Ackerman	Kari Lizer & Jeff Astrof	September 23, 2009	3X5601	7.17
Season 5 opens shortly after Richard was left at the altar. As Richard plans to win New Christine back, Christine and Matthew disparage their lost loves. However, when Christine finds out Barb is being detained and may be deported, she runs to her side. Barb thinks a guy named Bongo can help her, so Christine and Matthew fly to the Bahamas to find him. Unfortunately, Christine loses her passport and ends up being detained in the Bahamas; they return 24 hours later with no Bongo. Meanwhile, Richard finds out New Christine is over him and is moving on. And Barb's immigration officer flirts with her saying if she's in a sham marriage, he'll overlook it and reinstate her status. Barb and Richard announce their engagement.
69	2	"Burning Love"	Andy Ackerman	Sherry Bilsing-Graham & Ellen Kreamer	September 30, 2009	3X5602	6.65
Christine decides to plan a get together with all their old friends (guest stars Jeanette O'Connor, Wayne Nickel, Dave Florek) from college in order to cheer up Richard, who's still depressed about the breakup with New Christine. When they arrive, all their old friends are much older than expected and Christine is horrified by the thought they're old too. Meanwhile Barb and Matthew go to New Christine's to pick up some clothes for Richard. Matthew doesn't think New Christine's blasé attitude is healthy and pushes her to connect with her anger. She ends up burning Richard's clothes. When they tell Richard about New Christine's rage, he is delighted: her previous apathy upset him, but anger is a cousin of love and he knows there's still hope for them.
70	3	"The Mole"	Andy Ackerman	Jack Burditt	October 7, 2009	3X5603	6.86
Christine panics when she discovers a suspicious mole and can't find a doctor to treat her because she has no health insurance (it lapsed when they left The Bloom Corporation). She becomes vaguely political and decides to make a documentary blowing the lid off the health care crisis. Her newly found passion quickly diminishes when a friend of Matthew's from medical school examines her and it turns out the mole is a piece of brownie. Meanwhile Richard and New Christine fight over what to do about their house and finally decide they can live together amicably, but not romantically.
71	4	"For Love or Money"	Andy Ackerman	Allan Rice	October 14, 2009	3X5604	6.99
Christine gets a lawyer (guest star Corbin Bernsen) after she learns Barb got one to handle their divorce. Unfortunately, Christine's divorce lawyer is very aggressive and persuades Christine to ask for money. This leads to a breakdown in their friendship, but they end up reconciling in time for Christine to be the maid of honor at Barb and Richard's wedding. Also, the meanie moms offer Matthew a lot of money for therapy but it turns out they don't really want therapy, they just want Matthew to compliment them.
72	5	"Doctor Little Man"	Andy Ackerman	Frank Pines	October 21, 2009	3X5605	6.58
With the gym closed for repairs, Christine decides to be Matthew's secretary after his quits. Turns out she's a great secretary, except she starts convincing his patients they are okay and don't need to come in. They end up having a huge fight, and she turns to Matthew's suite-mate and mentor, Max Kershaw (special guest star Eric McCormack), for support. She thinks she's dating Max, but he thinks she's coming for therapy and they never quite get their signals straight. Richard and New Christine, now living together platonically, end up having sex (she's a very sexual person). Unfortunately Richard thinks they're back together and to New Christine, it was just sex. Richard decides he has to move out.
73	6	"The Curious Case of Britney B"	Andy Ackerman	Matt Goldman	November 4, 2009	3X5607	6.68
Christine is thrilled when Britney B (guest star Stefanie Scott), the most popular girl in school, asks Ritchie to the 7th grade dance. She thinks they've become popular and isn't shy about lording it over the meanie moms. But when Christine learns that she wants to break up with him at the dance, she pays Britney $100 to stay with him, a process that quickly diminishes her popularity. Also, Richard and Matthew must convince a woman (guest star Marion Ross) to leave her apartment in order for them to move into it, and eventually do so by moving her into Christine's place. Note: Lily Goff and Marissa Blanchard return as the daughters of Marly and Lindsay.
74	7	"Nuts"	Andy Ackerman	Amy Iglow	November 11, 2009	3X5606	7.20
When Christine learns that Barb had Matthew do a backup recommendation for her INS application, she seeks solace with her new therapist, Dr. Max Kershaw. Unfortunately, Max confronts her with the issue that she does bail on things when they get hard. He puts her through the ropes to encourage her to finish things and when she finally has a mini-breakthrough, the end up hugging, reinforcing, once again that they are attracted to each other. Also, Matthew and Richard have moved into their new apartment, but Richard doesn't love the new arrangement: Matthew has set all these boundaries because of his lack of boundaries in his former arrangement with Christine and is no fun to live with.
75	8	"Love Means Never Having to Say You're Crazy"	Andy Ackerman	Jeff Astrof	November 18, 2009	3X5608	7.27
Christine and Richard set each other up on blind dates: Richard is thrilled with Christine's choice and ends up having endless sex with her, however when he tries to break up with Tracey (special guest star Jennifer Grey) because he is still in love with New Christine, she gets stalker crazy on him; Christine is furious because Richard sets her up with Tom again, but even though she's not interested she decides to accept his offer to take care of her. New Christine arrives at Christine's place and drops a bombshell on Richard.
76	9	"I Love Woo, I Hate You"	Andy Ackerman	Jack Burditt	November 25, 2009	3X5609	6.86
Barb insists that Christine join her on a date with Dave, the INS officer she's been dating since she got detained for problems with her immigration status. Barb is afraid Dave (guest star James Lesure) is going to propose and she doesn't want to get married; she likes things the way they are and if he proposes, she's going to have to break up with him. When Dave and Christine are alone, he reveals that he wants to break up with her. Christine convinces him to let Barb down gently and that he should propose to her so she'll break up with him. When he proposes, she accepts, much to his chagrin. Christine tells him that Barb will eventually break-up with him. 10 years later, Dave tells his and Barb's kids how he met their mother. Richard learns that just because New Christine is pregnant, they're not automatically back together. Richard must woo New Christine in order to win her back.
77	10	"Old Christine Meets Young Frankenstein"	Andy Ackerman	Frank Pines	December 9, 2009	3X5611	7.49
In order to set a good example for Ritchie, who has been caught bullying at school, Christine locates and apologizes to Frances Stein (guest star Amy Sedaris), the girl she bullied when she was in 7th grade. Frances tells Christine that she was traumatized by the teasing and only years of therapy and plastic surgery have helped her recover. She refuses to accept Christine's apology. Upset that she wasn't able to right her past wrongs, Christine asks Barb to put in a good word for her. Unfortunately, Frances thinks Barb is threatening her and when Frances goes to the gym to let Christine know she accepts her apology, things go from bad to worse as Christine ends up tying her up to get her to calm down.
78	11	"It's Beginning to Stink a Lot Like Christmas"	Andy Ackerman	Sherry Bilsing-Graham & Ellen Kreamer	December 16, 2009	3X5610	7.64
Christine gets cajoled into going to the neighborhood Christmas block party by Lucy, Matthew's old girlfriend that he's started dating again. It's a great party and Christine fits in well, but when she sees her neighbor's husband kissing another woman, she's confused. She tells her new friend who gets mad at her for being so "judgy", turns out the neighborhood is filled with swingers. Richard and New Christine introduce Ritchie to New Christine's crazy family Christmas celebration called Kinderclausen. It has many weird traditions, like only new babies get store-bought presents. Ritchie doesn't like it, so to appease him, New Christine mentions another Kinderclausen tradition where the oldest child gets to name the new baby. Ritchie decides to name the new baby Xbox 360, because that's what he really wants. Also, Matthew and Lucy, only recently reunited, break up again because of Lucy's sense of reality: Matthew can't deal with the fact she truly believes in Santa Claus.
79	12	"Whale of a Tale"	Andy Ackerman	Sherry Bilsing-Graham & Ellen Kreamer	January 13, 2010	3X5612	5.97
Christine tells her therapist, Max, that she is in love with him, but his reaction is not what she was expecting. Richard encourages Matthew to go out with their neighbor, Hannah, but the date ends up uncomfortable for Matthew after she saw his "Mong", which is a male thong that Max's sister created. Christine also sees Max wearing the "mong" after he helps her with a flat tire, where he confesses that he actually loves her but they can't date since he's her psychiatrist. She fires him, and they make out in her car.
80	13	"Truth or Dare"	Andy Ackerman	Jack Burditt	January 20, 2010	3X5613	6.21
Christine and Max have been dating for three weeks when at dinner she lets out that she loves him. Max does not say it back and when she receives a text message from an old boyfriend, Mr. Harris (guest star Blair Underwood), he even dares her to go out with him saying they have not said they are exclusive yet. Christine takes the dare and sets up a date with Mr. Harris who everyone, especially Matthew, thinks is gorgeous. As soon as Christine leaves for the date, Max shows up at Christine's house and admits to Matthew that he really does love Christine but wanted to give her "space" since he has ruined many relationships before because he latched on too fast. Matthew, Richard and Barb take Max to find Christine. Meanwhile, Christine is on her date with the stunning Mr. Harris but all she can talk about is Max. Mr. Harris admits he only asked Christine on this date to make his ex-girlfriend jealous and both of them work to forget their significant others but realize they no longer have any spark between them, when Max suddenly shows up and confesses that he loves her.
81	14	"A Family Unfair"	Andy Ackerman	Jeff Astrof	February 10, 2010	3X5614	8.10
Christine asks Richard for his help in order for her to have a new baby when she finds out Richard and New Christine plan on having their own baby soon.
82	15	"Sweet Charity"	Andy Ackerman	Frank Pines	March 3, 2010	3X5615	5.56
When Christine and Barb find their business unexpectedly profitable, Christine undergoes a personal crisis - deciding whether to spend her share of the new-found money on herself. Matthew suspects something when Richard begins to lie to New Christine about where he is.
83	16	"Subway, Somehow"	Andy Ackerman	Amy Iglow & Allan Rice	March 10, 2010	3X5616	7.67
In an effort to teach Ritchie's class some street smarts, Christine encourages the school to let them take the subway on a field trip but ends up stranded at the station as the train leaves without her.
84	17	"Up In The Airport"	Andy Ackerman	Sherry Bilsing-Graham & Ellen Kreamer	April 7, 2010	3X5617	5.97
Christine decides Ritchie deserves to go on a family vacation like his friends, but her plans to take him to Florida don't turn out quite as she had intended.
85	18	"Revenge Makeover"	Andy Ackerman	Tricia O'Kelley & Alex Kapp Horner	April 14, 2010	3X5618	6.18
Old Christine takes a cranky, very pregnant New Christine to a fancy salon to prepare her for the impromptu wedding that Richard is secretly planning.
86	19	"I Love What You Do For Me"	Andy Ackerman	Jack Burditt	April 21, 2010	3X5619	5.20
Max offers to help Christine make a major life change after she realizes that her five-year car lease is up and her life hasn't evolved in all that time. Note: Julia Louis-Dreyfus submitted this episode for consideration due to her nomination for the Primetime Emmy Award for Outstanding Lead Actress in a Comedy Series at the 62nd Primetime Emmy Awards.
87	20	"Scream"	Andy Ackerman	Jeff Astrof & Matt Goldman	May 5, 2010	3X5620	6.29
After a good-looking cop, who Old Christine assumes is a stripper, alerts her that there is a prowler in the neighborhood, she convinces Matthew to stay over. Meanwhile, New Christine goes into labor - on Old Christine's birthday.
88	21	"Get Smarter"	Andy Ackerman	Kari Lizer	May 12, 2010	3X5621	6.89
When Christine has Matthew and Barb throw her a "surprise" engagement party so she can get to know Max's friends, she begins to feel intellectually inferior to one particular guest, driving her to make a "surprising" decision.
