= Endless Shrimp =

Endless Shrimp may refer to:

- Endless Shrimp, a promotion at the American casual dining restaurant chain Red Lobster
- "Endless Shrimp, Endless Night", a season two episode of The New Adventures of Old Christine
