= Pilot (The New Adventures of Old Christine) =

- The New Adventures of Old Christine episode
- Christine and her son Ritchie are talking during breakfast, not from episode 1 .
- Episode no.: Season 1 Episode 1
- Directed by: Andy Ackerman
- Written by: Kari Lizer
- Original air date: March 13, 2006

Guest appearances
- Jordan Baker as Mrs. Belt; Amy Farrington as Ali

Episode chronology
← Previous —	Next → "Supertramp"

"Pilot" is the pilot episode of the American sitcom series The New Adventures of Old Christine.

== International titles ==
The German episode title is "Die neue Christine", meaning "The New Christine".

== Reception ==
=== Ratings and viewership ===
This episode was broadcast along with the second episode, titled "Supertramp", and both episodes was watched by 15.09 million American viewers and received a 5.4 rating among adults 18-49, placing eleventh for the week. This is also the second most watched episode of the entire series, with the third episode of this season, "Open Water", being the most watched episode.

=== Critical reception ===
The pilot episode received generally favorable reviews, with Julia Louis-Dreyfus's acting being praised. The review website Metacritic.com, which tabulates critics' reviews, gave it a 64 — equating to their summary of "generally positive reviews", with 16 out of 26 critics reviews deemed as positive. A Los Angeles Times review notes that "Louis-Dreyfus makes Christine feel fresh and real" and the show has a "dry charm and a nice tone of affectionate irony." Brian Zoromski, from IGN TV, gave the episode a mixed review, where he says that the series "it's enjoyable and has some occasional very funny jokes", but "fails to completely utilize Louis-Dreyfus's comedic talents".
