= The Ellen Show =

American television sitcom (2001–2002)

- Genre: Sitcom
- Created by: Ellen DeGeneres; Mitchell Hurwitz (co-creator); Carol Leifer (co-creator)
- Starring: Ellen DeGeneres; Jim Gaffigan; Emily Rutherfurd; Martin Mull; Kerri Kenney; Cloris Leachman
- Theme music composer: Jude Christodal
- Composer: David Schwartz
- Country of origin: United States
- Original language: English
- No. of seasons: 1
- No. of episodes: 18 (13 aired)

Production
- Camera setup: Multi-camera
- Running time: 30 minutes
- Production companies: The Hurwitz Company; CBS Productions; Columbia TriStar Television (2001); Columbia TriStar Domestic Television (2001–2002)

Original release
- Network: CBS
- Release: September 24, 2001 – January 11, 2002

The Ellen Show is an American television sitcom created by and starring Ellen DeGeneres that was broadcast during the 2001–02 season on CBS, airing from September 24, 2001, to January 11, 2002. It also starred Cloris Leachman, Martin Mull, Kerri Kenney, Jim Gaffigan, and Emily Rutherfurd, with Diane Delano recurring.

It was DeGeneres' second attempt at a sitcom, following Ellen on ABC (1994–98), but it was unable to attract strong ratings and was cancelled after 13 episodes, leaving 5 unaired. Unlike many short-lived sitcoms, which often disappear and are hard to find, the series is still available on DVD and is also digitally distributed in some markets.

== Plot ==
After her internet company Homelearn.com goes bankrupt, Ellen Richmond decides to move back to her hometown to live with her eccentric mother, Dot, and scatter-brained sister, Catherine. At home, Ellen becomes reacquainted with her senior prom date, Rusty, who thinks they can pick up where they left off (which, since she is gay, seems unlikely), and her befuddled high school teacher, Mr. Munn. Though worlds apart from the people who love her, Ellen begins to adjust to a very different way of life and takes a job as a guidance counselor at her former high school.

== Cast ==
=== Main ===
- Ellen DeGeneres as Ellen Richmond
- Jim Gaffigan as Rusty Carnouk
- Emily Rutherfurd as Catherine Richmond
- Martin Mull as Ed Munn
- Kerri Kenney as Pam
- Cloris Leachman as Dot Richmond
- Diane Delano as Bunny Hoppstetter (recurring)

=== Notable guest stars ===
- Jennifer Irwin as Meg (episode: "Pilot" - the character became Pam played by Kerri Kenney instead)
- Regan Burns as Officer "B" Arthur (episodes: "Walden Pond", "Joe"")
- John Francis Daley as Erik (episode: "Walden Pond")
- Susan Yeagley as Waitress (episode: "Chain Reaction")
- James Patrick Stuart as Guy, the Vanity Fur pet groomer/stylist (episode: "Vanity Hair")
- Marissa Jaret Winokur as Tina (episode: "Vanity Hair")
- Tom Poston as Joe (episode: "Joe")
- Betty White as Mrs. Gibson (episode: "Missing the Bus")
- Dakota Fanning as Young Ellen (episode: "Missing the Bus")
- Mary Tyler Moore as Aunt Mary (episode: "Ellen's First Christmess")
- Ed Asner as Santa Claus (episode: "Ellen's First Christmess")
- John Ritter as Percy Moss (episode: "Gathering Moss")
- Maureen McCormick as Rita Carter (episode: "Shallow Gal")
- Seán Cullen as two different characters (episodes: Guitarist in "Just the Duck" and Christian Snee in "One for the Roadshow")
- Kaley Cuoco as Vanessa Carter (episode: "Shallow Gal")
- Ellen's real-life mother Betty DeGeneres and her brother Vance DeGeneres appeared in an episode (episode: "Just the Duck")

== Production ==
The show was created by Carol Leifer and Mitchell Hurwitz, who co-wrote the pilot episode. The original title was Ellen Again. DeGeneres came out as a lesbian in the later seasons of her sitcom Ellen. Her character on The Ellen Show, Ellen Richmond, was also a lesbian, although it was more of an aside, the show not focusing much on the character's sexuality.

Four cast members from The Mary Tyler Moore Show featured in the sitcom - regular Cloris Leachman, plus guest stars Betty White, Ed Asner, and Mary Tyler Moore herself, the latter two reuniting in the same episode alongside Leachman (White appeared in a separate episode). Moore had also appeared in two episodes of DeGeneres's previous sitcom, Ellen, and would also later appear as a guest on her talk show, The Ellen DeGeneres Show.

== Episodes ==
The Ellen Show produced 18 episodes, but was canceled 2/3 of the way through its season. The final 5 episodes were never broadcast, but are available on DVD.

No.	Title	Directed by	Written by	Original release date	Prod. code	Viewers (millions)
1	"Pilot"	Andy Ackerman	Carol Leifer & Mitchell Hurwitz	September 24, 2001	0105–1000	13.84
An Internet entrepreneur returns to live in her hometown after her new business venture suddenly collapses.
2	"Walden Pond"	Andrew D. Weyman	Carol Leifer	September 28, 2001	0105–1001	6.71
Ellen decides to make some decisions about her future, hoping to find inspiration by sitting by a pond and reading Walden by Henry David Thoreau.
3	"Chain Reaction"	Andrew D. Weyman	Carol Leifer & Chuck Martin	October 5, 2001	0105–1002	6.39
Ellen tries to rally the town against a new restaurant that features scantily clad waitresses.
4	"Vanity Hair"	Andrew D. Weyman	Ric Swartzlander	October 12, 2001	0105–1003	6.23
A profile in Vanity Fair gets Ellen thinking about a new hairdo.
5	"The Move"	Andrew D. Weyman	Rob LaZebnik & Mitchell Hurwitz	October 19, 2001	0105–1004	5.19
Ellen's moving home causes friction, leading to her sister Catherine moving out to live with a new boyfriend.
6	"Muskrat Love"	Andrew D. Weyman	Carol Leifer & Chuck Martin	October 26, 2001	0105–1005	5.74
As she looks to rid the yard of a pesky raccoon, Ellen is asked to help a lovesick high school student.
7	"Joe"	Andrew D. Weyman	Mitchell Hurwitz & Rob LaZebnik	November 2, 2001	0105–1006	5.86
Ellen's search for the perfect cup of coffee reveals some disturbing news about her mother Dot's new boyfriend.
8	"Cathy's Taffy"	Andrew D. Weyman	Story by : Sue Kolinsky; Teleplay by : Carol Leifer & Chuck Martin	November 9, 2001	0105–1007	6.87
Ellen launches a new business to sell her sister Catherine's delicious homemade taffy.
9	"Missing the Bus"	Andrew D. Weyman	Story by : Jim Gerkin & Ric Swartzlander; Teleplay by : Ric Swartzlander	November 16, 2001	0105–1010	6.24
Ellen's efforts to honor a longtime district employee ends up costing the aging school bus driver (special guest star Betty White) her job.
10	"Alive and Kicking"	Andrew D. Weyman	Carol Leifer & Chuck Martin	December 10, 2001	0105–1009	10.32
Ellen tries to counsel the school's troubled kicker on the eve of a championship football game.
11	"Ellen's First Christmess"	Andrew D. Weyman	Darin Henry	December 17, 2001	0105–1012	13.61
Ellen's plan for her Aunt Mary's (special guest star Mary Tyler Moore) surprise Christmas appearance exposes some ill will between Dot and her famous sister. (Also features a special appearance by Ed Asner in a nod to The Mary Tyler Moore Show, which starred Moore, The Ellen Show regular Cloris Leachman, and Asner.)
12	"A Bird in the Hand"	Andrew D. Weyman	Sue Kolinsky	January 4, 2002	0105–1008	6.45
When Dot gives Ellen an heirloom brooch, Catherine is jealous and Ellen is less than excited. Matters only get worse when she loses the brooch and has to fess up.
13	"Just the Duck"	Andrew D. Weyman	Jim Gerkin	January 11, 2002	0105–1013	5.93
Ellen discovers Catherine on a secret date with Rusty and is invited to join them; with an imminent breakup, a surprise rebound may be in the works.
14	"Shallow Gal"	Andrew D. Weyman	Harold Kimmel	Unaired	0105–1011	N/A
When Ellen realizes she was the unpopular geek in school, she gets desperate and befriends the ex-head cheerleader. Is Ellen now the snob? (Guest star Kaley Cuoco also played a young Ellen in her previous sitcom Ellen.)
15	"Gathering Moss"	Andrew D. Weyman	Bill Kelley	Unaired	0105–1015	N/A
Catherine and Ellen attend a self-actualization session where they learn to "see it, want it, take it." They instead discover they can't take each other! Special guest star: John Ritter.
16	"A Matter of Principal"	Andrew D. Weyman	Darin Henry	Unaired	0105–1016	N/A
After Ellen is left in charge of the school, her alternative approach leads to chaos. With a student body in complete anarchy, Ellen finds out a secret.
17	"Where the Sun Doesn't Shine"	Andrew D. Weyman	Chuck Martin	Unaired	0105–1017	N/A
When Ellen lobbies for her mother Dot to receive the annual town Sunshine Prize, Ellen discovers that she's also up for the prize, and is the favorite to win.
18	"One for the Roadshow"	Andrew D. Weyman	Story by : Mitchell Hurwitz & Rob LaZebnik; Teleplay by : Darin Henry & Bill Kelley	Unaired	0105–1014	N/A
Ellen discovers that the board game her Aunt Mary gave her years ago that has never been opened is worth thousands of dollars, enough for Ellen to move out.

== Home media and streaming ==
Sony Pictures Home Entertainment released the complete series on DVD in Region 1 in a 2-disc box set on July 11, 2006.

In 2014, Mill Creek Entertainment acquired the rights to the series and subsequently re-released the complete series on February 4, 2014.

Paramount Pictures Home Entertainment, in partnership with CBS Home Entertainment, owns the international rights. The complete series was released in Region 4 (Australia) as a 2 DVD set on February 1, 2017 by Umbrella Entertainment.

As of 2023, all episodes can be seen for free on Crackle and Fubo in the United States and on CTV in Canada. The show is also available for purchase on Apple TV and Amazon in the United States.
