= James Lesure =

American actor (born 1970)

- Born: September 21, 1970 (age 55); Los Angeles, California, U.S.
- Occupation: Actor
- Years active: 1992–present

James Lesure (born September 21, 1970) is an American film and television actor, best known for roles on the NBC/The WB sitcom For Your Love (1998–2002), and NBC comedy-drama Las Vegas (2003–2008), Girlfriends' Guide to Divorce (2017–2018) and Good Girls (2018–2020).

== Early life and education ==
Lesure was born in Los Angeles, California. He attended the US Air Force Academy before dropping out and attending the University of Southern California and the USC School of Dramatic Arts. During his student years, Lesure began appearing on stage, performing in Hair and The Island.

== Career ==
Lesure had guest starring roles in a number of television shows during the 1990s, including; Mad About You, Martin, Seinfeld, and NYPD Blue. His big break came in 1998, when he was cast as co-lead opposite Holly Robinson Peete in the NBC sitcom For Your Love. It was canceled after six episodes, but was picked up by The WB Network. It ran there for four years before its 2002 cancellation. From 2003 to 2008, he starred as Mike Cannon on the NBC comedy-drama Las Vegas.

Lesure had recurring roles on Alias, Half & Half, Studio 60 on the Sunset Strip, Lipstick Jungle, The New Adventures of Old Christine and Blue Bloods. He also starred as basketball star Alonzo Pope on the short-lived ABC comedy series Mr. Sunshine in 2011 alongside Matthew Perry and Allison Janney. From 2012 to 2014, he starred on the TBS sitcom Men at Work. In 2014 he guest starred on CSI: Crime Scene Investigation as Dr. Emmet in the episode "Bad Blood". In 2015 Lesure had a recurring role as Alex McBride on Blue Bloods. In 2016, he starred in the ABC comedy series Uncle Buck opposite Mike Epps and Nia Long. In 2017, he appeared on Girlfriends' Guide to Divorce as a baseball coach during seasons 3, 4 and 5. In 2018, he had a recurring role as an FBI agent on Good Girls. Later in 2018, he had a recurring role as Congressman Trey Thomason on Salvation. In 2019 he appeared as Henry, the boyfriend of Sarah Jessica Parker's lead character Frances on season 3 of the HBO series Divorce.

Lesure appeared in a main role in the 2021 television show Rebel.

== Filmography ==
=== Film ===
Year	Title	Role	Notes
1995	The O. J. Simpson Story	A.C.'s Cop	TV movie
1995	Crimson Tide	Guard #2	
1998	Show and Prove	P-Nut	Short
1999	Giving It Up	Kevin	
2002	What Wouldn't Jesus Do?	Jesus Christ	Short
2003	African-American Idol: The Search for the Next Black Leader	Shekar Orr	Short
2005	The Ring Two	Doctor	
2006	The Package	Bounce	Short
2007	Loveless in Los Angeles	Clint	
2010	Our Family Wedding	Officer Turman	
2010	Casting Call	Gary	Short
2012	The Turn	Chance	Short
2012	Fire with Fire	Craig Tucker	

=== Television ===
Year	Title	Role	Notes
1992	Martin	Guy	Episode: "Things I Do for Love"
1995	Hope & Gloria	Delivery Man	Episode: "No Degrees of Separation"
1995	Space: Above and Beyond	Lt. Stone	Episode: "Eyes"
1995	NYPD Blue	Lt. Willis	Episode: "Vishy-Vashy-Vinny"
1996	Mad About You	Maitre D'	Episode: "The Glue People"
1996	Pacific Blue	Ray	Episode: "Burnout"
1996	Martin	Kalvin Kani	Episode: "Working Girls"
1996	Seinfeld	Office Worker	Episode: "The Bizarro Jerry"
1996	Diagnosis: Murder	Skate Shop Clerk	Episode: "Murder on Thin Ice"
1996	Dangerous Minds	Carl Murray	Episode: "Moonstruck"
1997	The Burning Zone	-	Episode: "Critical Mass"
1997	The Drew Carey Show	Alan	Episode: "Drew Gets Married"
1997	Saved by the Bell: The New Class	Lieutenant Griffin	Episode: "Private Peterson"
1998	Getting Personal	Ralph Cooper	Episode: "Fix Me Up, Tie Me Down"
1998–02	For Your Love	Melvin "Mel" Ellis	Main cast
2000	Intimate Portrait	Himself	Episode: "Holly Robinson Peete"
2000	Suddenly Susan	David Gordon, M.D.	Episode: "The Dinner Party"
2002	NYPD Blue	Marcus Hodges	Episode: "Hand Job"
2002	George Lopez	Ben Adams	Episode: "Token of Unappreciation"
2002–03	Alias	Craig Blair	Recurring cast: season 2
2002–03	Half & Half	Brian LeFine	Recurring cast: season 1
2003	The Division	Johnny Sloan	Episode: "Radioactive Spider" & "Acts of Betrayal"
2003–08	Las Vegas	Mike Cannon	Main cast
2006	1 vs. 100	Himself	Episode: "Episode #1.6"
2007	Lost	Dr. Rob Hamill	Episode: "Through the Looking Glass: Part 1 & 2"
2007	Studio 60 on the Sunset Strip	Captain Boyle	Recurring cast
2008	Monk	Ray Regis	Episode: "Mr. Monk Takes a Punch"
2008–09	Lipstick Jungle	Griffin Bell	Recurring cast: season 2
2009	Sherri	Myles Marson	Episode: "Game Changer"
2009	The New Adventures of Old Christine	Dave	Recurring cast: seasons 4-5
2011	Let's Stay Together	Darryl	Episode: "The Fourth Wheel"
2011	Harry's Law	Sr. Taylor	Episode: "Bad to Worse"
2011	Mr. Sunshine	Alonzo Pope	Main cast
2012–14	Men at Work	Gibbs	Main cast
2013	Happy Endings	Elliot	Episode: "Brothas & Sisters"
2014	CSI: Crime Scene Investigation	Dr. Emmett	Episode: "Bad Blood"
2014–15	Blue Bloods	DA Investigator Alex McBride	Recurring cast (season 5), guest (season 6)
2016	Uncle Buck	Will Russell	Main cast
2017–18	Girlfriends' Guide to Divorce	Mike Brady	Recurring cast (seasons 3-5)
2018	Salvation	Trey Thomason	Recurring cast: season 2
2018–20	Good Girls	FBI Agent Jimmy Turner	Recurring cast (seasons 1-2), guest (season 3)
2019	Divorce	Henry	Recurring cast (season 3)
2020	Schooled	Leslie	Episode: "Principal for a Day"
2021	Rebel	Benji Ray	Main cast
2022	Winning Time: The Rise of the Lakers Dynasty	Julius Erving	Recurring cast (season 1)
2022–2023	The Rookie: Feds	Special Agent Carter Hope	Main cast
2023	Celebrity Family Feud	Himself/Contestant	Episode: "Episode #10.8"
2023	The Rookie	Special Agent Carter Hope	Episode: "The List"
2025	Matlock	Lester "The Wolf" Logan	Episode: "Tomorrow Is Still Tomorrow"
