= Maggie Winters (TV series) =

- Genre: Sitcom
- Created by: Kari Lizer
- Starring: Faith Ford; Alex Kapp Horner; Jenny Robertson; Brian Haley; Clea Lewis; Shirley Knight
- Composer: W.G. Snuffy Walden
- Country of origin: United States
- Original language: English
- No. of seasons: 1
- No. of episodes: 18 (2 unaired)

Production
- Executive producers: Bob Greenblatt; David Janollari; Kari Lizer; Faith Ford
- Producer: Suzy Friendly
- Cinematography: Steven V. Silver
- Running time: 30 minutes
- Production companies: The Greenblatt/Janollari Studio; CBS Productions; Fox Television Studios

Original release
- Network: CBS
- Release: September 30, 1998 – February 3, 1999

Maggie Winters is an American sitcom television series created by Kari Lizer starring Faith Ford as the title character. The series aired on CBS from September 30, 1998 to February 3, 1999.

== Plot ==
Recently divorced from her dentist husband, Maggie Winters moved in with her mother Estelle in her hometown of Shelbyville, Indiana and got a job at Hanley's, a local department store.

== Cast ==
=== Main cast ===
- Faith Ford as Maggie Winters
- Alex Kapp Horner as Lisa Harte
- Jenny Robertson as Robin Foster
- Brian Haley as Tom Vanderhulst
- Clea Lewis as Rachel Tomlinson
- Shirley Knight as Estelle Winters

=== Recurring cast ===
- Brianna & Brittany McConnell as Katie Foster
- Michael McKean as Lewis Stickley
- Patrick Warburton as Sonny Mayfield

=== Notable guest stars ===
- Edward Asner as Nathan Winters
- Shelley Duvall as Muriel
- Nathan Fillion as Ronald
- Steven Gilborn as Mr. Undercoffler
- Judy Greer as Tawny
- Ken Berry as Sheriff Riley
- David James Elliott as Jack
- Kevin Weisman as Harold
- Paul Sand as Brad
- Gregory Harrison as Mr. Wiehe
- Steve Franken as Mr. Addison

== Episodes ==
No.	Title	Directed by	Written by	Original release date	Prod. code	Viewers (millions)
1	"Total Eclipse"	Michael Lessac	Kari Lizer	September 30, 1998	03-98-179	12.91
Maggie leaves her cheating husband and returns to her hometown of Shelbyville, Indiana to move back in with her mother.
2	"Maggie's Master Plan"	Michael Lessac	Kari Lizer	October 7, 1998	03-98-101	10.70
Maggie works toward the plan written down in her diary long ago to get a fabulous job in fashion, move out of her mom's house, and live happily ever after with Bobby. Unfortunately, once again things don't go quite as planned.
3	"Likeable Maggie"	Michael Lessac	Leslie Caveny	October 14, 1998	03-98-104	9.36
Maggie meets the owner of Sonny's, the restaurant where she and the gang hang out, and doesn't like him much until she finds out that everyone loves him. Then she sets out to make him like her like she does everyone else.
4	"Mama's Got a Brand New Bag"	Michael Lessac	Eve Ahlert & Dennis Drake	October 21, 1998	03-98-102	7.94
Saturday night and Mom's got a date and Maggie doesn't. Later she finds out that her mom also has a sex life and must come to terms with that knowledge. Meanwhile, Lisa tries to avoid having sex and a guy she really likes.
5	"Suburban Myth"	Michael Lessac	Jeanette Collins & Mimi Friedman	October 28, 1998	03-98-105	8.59
Maggie babysits Robin and Jeff's children.
6	"Singles Night"	Michael Lessac	Susannah Hardaway	November 4, 1998	03-98-106	8.53
Maggie is introduced to the concept of singles night at the grocery store: you get a 10% discount and maybe a date. Of course, she still has to confront the task of signing her divorce papers.
7	"Friend or Faux"	Michael Lessac	Mark Amato	November 11, 1998	03-98-107	9.24
Maggie and Robin attempt to divert Lisa's attention from dating her new over-educated flame, but in the process Lisa and Maggie unfriend one another. Meanwhile, Estelle analyses one of Tom's dreams after taking a dream analysis course, but he doesn't like the outcome.
8	"And Those Who Can't"	Michael Lessac	Eve Ahlert & Dennis Drake	November 18, 1998	03-98-109	9.05
Maggie runs into the high school teacher that she, Lisa, and Robin had a crush on, and this leads to a date.
9	"Angstgiving Day"	Michael Lessac	Leslie Caveny	November 25, 1998	03-98-108	9.43
Maggie's attempts at having her parents under the same roof to celebrate Thanksgiving go awry.
10	"Dinner at Rachel's"	Michael Lessac	Bill Canterbury	December 9, 1998	03-98-103	6.71
Maggie receives the employee of the month award; she also endures a bizarre dinner at Rachel's with her and her family. Meanwhile, Robin, Lisa, Jeff, and Tom are left to be entertained by Estelle so the gang plays a game.
11	"When Sonny Gets Blue"	Michael Lessac	Lawrence Broch	December 16, 1998	03-98-110	6.81
Maggie's sex life has slowed down, but the opportunity presents itself for closure and (you know) after she agrees to accompany Sonny to a wedding - his ex-girlfriend's.
12	"You'll Never Walk Alone in This Town Again"	Lee Shallatt	Kari Lizer	January 4, 1999	03-98-112	11.11
After trying to assist Tom with his landlord problem instead of helping, Maggie's efforts gets him evicted. Meanwhile, Lisa finds herself attracted to Tom's different 'unkempt' look.
13	"Working Robin"	Lee Shallat-Chemel	Bill Canterbury	January 6, 1999	03-98-111	7.62
Maggie is promoted at work and the perk includes hiring an assistant so she hires Robin, but quickly regrets this decision after learning how difficult it is working with her.
14	"Sometimes You Feel Like a Nut"	Lee Shallat-Chemel	Susannah Hardaway	January 20, 1999	03-98-113	6.99
After falling victim to a home invasion upon learning her home was robbed, Maggie joins the neighborhood watch program.
15	"Suffering Estelle"	Lee Shallat-Chemel	Bill Canterbury	January 27, 1999	03-98-114	5.75
Upon injuring her back Estelle takes advantage of Maggie's kindness by having her wait on her hand and foot.
16	"Girls Night Out"	Lee Shallat-Chemel	Leslie Caveny	February 3, 1999	03-98-117	6.38
Girls night out doesn't go as planned: Maggie spends it reconciling her feelings for Jack; her mother winds up spending the evening with Tom after Estelle suggested he have a guys' night.
17	"Spare Me"	Lee Shallat-Chemel	Jeanette Collins & Mimi Friedman	Unaired	03-98-115	N/A
A friendly game of bowling goes wrong after Maggie returns to her old competitive ways, and Robin's confidence leads to gloating.
18	"Three for the Seesaw"	Lee Shallat-Chemel	Eve Ahlert & Dennis Drake	Unaired	03-98-116	N/A
Feeling like her space has been invaded, Maggie schemes in order to get Tom to move out of the garage by fixing him up with Rachel.
