= The New Adventures of Old Christine =

2006 American television sitcom

- Title card
- Genre: Sitcom
- Created by: Kari Lizer
- Directed by: Andy Ackerman
- Starring: Julia Louis-Dreyfus; Clark Gregg; Hamish Linklater; Trevor Gagnon; Emily Rutherfurd; Tricia O'Kelley; Alex Kapp Horner; Wanda Sykes
- Country of origin: United States
- Original language: English
- No. of seasons: 5
- No. of episodes: 88 (list of episodes)

Production
- Executive producers: Andy Ackerman; Ellen Kreamer; Jack Burditt; Jeff Astrof; Kari Lizer; Sherry Bilsing-Graham
- Producers: Lisa Helfrich Jackson; Julia Louis-Dreyfus (season 5)
- Camera setup: Multi-camera
- Running time: 22–24 minutes
- Production companies: Kari's Logo Here; Warner Bros. Television

Original release
- Network: CBS
- Release: March 13, 2006 – May 12, 2010

The New Adventures of Old Christine (often shortened to simply Old Christine) is an American sitcom created by Kari Lizer that aired on CBS from March 13, 2006, to May 12, 2010. The series stars Julia Louis-Dreyfus as Christine Campbell, a single mother balancing her work and personal life while maintaining a close relationship with her ex-husband, Richard, played by Clark Gregg. The show also features Hamish Linklater as Christine’s brother Matthew, Wanda Sykes as her best friend Barb, and Trevor Gagnon as her son Ritchie.

The sitcom revolves around Christine's humorous and often chaotic attempts to keep pace with the changing world around her, especially as she navigates life as a divorcée, while her ex-husband moves on with a younger girlfriend, also named Christine, referred to as "New Christine." Filming primarily took place in Los Angeles, California, with Andy Ackerman directing all 88 episodes.

The New Adventures of Old Christine received positive reviews from critics. Throughout its run, the series received 9 Primetime Emmy Award nominations, with Louis-Dreyfus winning Outstanding Lead Actress in a Comedy Series in 2006.

CBS canceled The New Adventures of Old Christine after five seasons on May 18, 2010.

== Background ==
Christine Campbell (portrayed by Julia Louis-Dreyfus) is a neurotic and often self-absorbed single mother. She owns a women’s gym and grapples with her insecurities, while striving to maintain some semblance of control over her chaotic life. She shares a complicated yet cordial relationship with her ex-husband, Richard (Clark Gregg), whose younger girlfriend—also named Christine—is referred to as "New Christine," much to her chagrin. This leads to Christine being called "Old Christine," a source of ongoing humor in the series.

Christine lives with her son, Ritchie (Trevor Gagnon), and her brother, Matthew (Hamish Linklater), a therapist who often provides sarcastic yet supportive advice. Christine's best friend and business partner, Barb (Wanda Sykes), frequently acts as her confidante, offering both comic relief and level-headed counsel amidst Christine's many personal dilemmas.

Throughout the series, Christine’s life is marked by her competitive, and often disastrous, attempts to keep up with the societal pressures around her. This includes her ongoing rivalry with the wealthy and condescending "meanie moms" at her son’s private school, Marly Ehrhardt (Tricia O'Kelley) and Lindsay (Alex Kapp Horner), who often exacerbate her feelings of inadequacy.

The series humorously explores Christine's journey through motherhood, friendship, and self-discovery, while highlighting her struggles with modern life and her efforts to rebuild post-divorce.

There are guest appearances from actors including Blair Underwood, Dave Foley, Eric McCormack, Jason Alexander, Jennifer Grey, Jeffrey Tambor, Megan Mullally, Scott Bakula, Ed Begley Jr., Kristen Johnston, Molly Shannon, Andy Richter, Amy Sedaris, Lee Tergesen, Jane Lynch, and Marion Ross.

== History ==
=== Synopsis ===
Trevor Gagnon and Julia Louis-Dreyfus in Season 1; Episode 3 "Open Water".

The first season consists of 13 episodes and premiered on March 13, 2006. In this season Christine has only just enrolled her son, Ritchie, at a new posh private school, where she is constantly being humiliated by Marly and Lindsay, some non-working mothers at the school. On top of all this, she has just discovered her ex-husband, Richard, has started dating a much younger woman who is also named Christine. Christine has a brief fling with Burton Schaefer, her on-and-off romantic interest, but they soon break up due to Christine not being able to commit to the relationship. In the season finale, Christine kisses Richard, causing him to tell New Christine, who promptly breaks up with him.

The second season consists of 22 episodes and premiered on September 18, 2006. Due to Richard and Christine spending more time together after his breakup with New Christine, Ritchie believes that his parents have gotten back together, much to his parents' dismay. Christine starts dating an older man, who she later discovers is New Christine's father. Richard and New Christine rekindle their romance once again. Barb decides to start working at the gym with Christine, while Christine falls hard for Ritchie's new teacher, Mr. Harris. The season finale included Richard sleeping with Christine after breaking up with New Christine yet again. This causes a pregnancy scare for Christine, which is soon avoided. Eventually, New Christine takes Richard back and Mr. Harris takes a new teaching job at another school, allowing him and Christine to start dating.

The third season was scheduled as a midseason replacement on CBS with 13 episodes scheduled. Due to the 2007 writer's strike, the third season consists of only 10 episodes. The third season premiered on February 4, 2008. Christine and Mr. Harris have a good relationship, until Christine's schedule becomes too hectic midway through the season; so they eventually break up. Meanwhile, Richard and New Christine buy a house together, which coincidentally is Christine's dream house, leaving her feeling jealous and confused. Barb leaves her husband and she has a short-lived fling with Matthew, much to Christine's horror.

The fourth season, consisting of 22 episodes, premiered on September 24, 2008. As she is Bahamian, Barb faces deportation from the U.S. after her divorce, so Christine decides to marry her in a sham lesbian marriage in order to keep her best friend in the country. Richard and New Christine become engaged while Matthew finds love with one of his clients. Christine has a brief relationship with a man named Patrick, while Christine and Barb decide to turn their gym into a spa which they later discover has turned into a brothel. On the day of Richard and New Christine's wedding, Christine briefly gets back together with New Christine's father, but is later left heartbroken when she discovers that he is engaged. This causes Richard to rush to Christine's side, provoking the jealous New Christine to leave him at the altar. Meanwhile, Barb and Christine's sham marriage is discovered by Dave, an INS officer, leaving Barb imprisoned.

The fifth and final season, consisting of 21 episodes, premiered on September 23, 2009. Barb is released from custody and marries Richard so that she can stay in the country. She also starts dating the immigration officer Dave. While Richard tries to win New Christine back, he temporarily moves into a new apartment with Matthew. Christine begins going to therapy, but she is attracted to her therapist, Max. They eventually abandon Christine's therapy and strike up a relationship instead. New Christine announces that she is pregnant, causing Richard to rekindle his relationship with her. New Christine eventually gives birth to a baby girl. Meanwhile, Barb becomes engaged to a reluctant Dave. At the conclusion of the season, Christine also becomes engaged to Max, but she feels intimidated by his very educated friends, and also in an effort to improve herself and reach her potential, she decides to return to college.

=== Cancellation ===
In May 2010, CBS canceled The New Adventures of Old Christine. Afterward, series creator Kari Lizer slammed the network, suggesting the decision to cancel the series was sexist. In an interview with TV Guide, Lizer stated: "As far as what happened at CBS, we've suffered from a serious lack of support from them since the beginning. I hate to say it, but I'm afraid they don't care much for the female-of-a-certain-age point of view over there. How else do you explain them squandering the talents of Julia [Louis-Dreyfus] and Wanda [Sykes]?" With support from Lizer, Warner Bros. Television began negotiations to continue the series on ABC, but a deal could not be made reportedly due to a high licensing fee.

== Cast and characters ==
=== Main cast ===
- "Old" Christine Kimble Campbell (Julia Louis-Dreyfus), the main character of the series, is a divorced mother who owns and operates a gym for women. She has a number of neuroses: although she suffers from feelings of inadequacy, she can also be very self-centered and thinks very highly of her looks. Christine's bad luck with relationships continues after her divorce. Her age is unknown (although at one point she mentions growing up in the 70s). An ongoing joke is her addiction to wine and trimming decades off her real age.
- Richard Campbell (Clark Gregg) is Christine's ex-husband, who maintains a frequent presence in her life. After divorcing Christine, he finds love with another woman also named Christine, who is nicknamed "New Christine". He suffers from commitment issues; taking months to tell New Christine that he loves her and four years to propose to New Christine. Richard's presence in his ex-wife's life causes a strain between himself and New Christine, which results in her walking out on their wedding. Richard accepts the fact she doesn't want him back, though he and New Christine reunite when she becomes pregnant.
- Matthew Kimble (Hamish Linklater) is Christine's long-suffering, live-in brother who often acts as a low-key straight man to his neurotic sister. Matthew has trouble finding a career path; he enters and then quits medical school before pursuing a career as a therapist. He suffers from an unhealthy attachment to his mother; whom he still kisses on the mouth and needs to speak to on a nightly basis in order to fall asleep. He constantly teases Christine's age, usually implying that she is "old". Matthew frequently dates women but is rarely interested in them beyond a one-night stand. He is also portrayed as a pot smoker, but in one episode, he claims that he has never done drugs.
- Richard "Richie" Campbell Jr. (Trevor Gagnon), Christine and Richard's son, who attends a posh private school. Often smothered by his mother, his lack of masculine traits begins to worry his father. He is not very bright and mediocre in all his after-school activities.
- "New" Christine Liesl Hunter (Emily Rutherfurd) is Richard's young, sweet and confused girlfriend, nicknamed New Christine. She is sometimes annoyed by Richard's continued closeness with Old Christine, who treats her with derision, leading to friction between the two women. She is also frustrated with Richard's lack of commitment to their relationship and walks out on their wedding due to his dedication to Old Christine. She also becomes furious when she learns that she is pregnant, even though Richard told her he had a vasectomy. They re-kindle their relationship and Christine gives birth to a daughter named Dakota Christine Hunter-Campbell in the season 5 episode "Scream".
- Marly Ehrhardt (Note: Last name established in the season two episode "Crash".) (Tricia O'Kelley) is a rich mother from Richie's private school who often puts Christine down for being divorced, having a low income and being a working mother. Christine often calls Marly and Lindsay the "meanie moms". Marly has a daughter, Ashley. She is said to have had much plastic surgery, and can evidently no longer turn her neck or wink. In the fourth season, Marly becomes pregnant again and forces her friend Lindsay to become pregnant with her, so that they can both "ruin their bodies together".
- Lindsay (Alex Kapp Horner), one of the "meanie moms" from Ritchie's school, who is best friends with Marly, although Marly is clearly dominant to the subservient Lindsay, who often does things against her will to earn Marly's approval. They frequently make Christine feel inferior and poor. Lindsay has a daughter, Kelsey, whom Marly believes is a lesbian. In the fourth season, Lindsay becomes pregnant along with Marly. She was previously a brunette and getting her master's in Women's Studies before she met Marly. On a few occasions, she has been shown to be kind to Old Christine, unbeknownst to Marly.
- Barbara "Barb" Baran (Wanda Sykes) (recurring seasons 1–2; starring seasons 3–5) is Christine's sarcastic best friend and colleague at the gym. Barb, who in one episode was referred to as "my black friend, Barb" by Old Christine, is divorced and in the fourth season is revealed to be from The Bahamas and not an American citizen. She has a dry, droll sense of humor and is rarely enthused by any of Christine's plans. Barb and Christine get married early in season four to save Barb from deportation, but their same-sex marriage results in them losing ownership of their gym. After they lose the gym, Barb sells her condo to build up a new business and marries Richard to stave off deportation.

=== Recurring cast ===
- Ashley Ehrhardt (Lily Goff), Marly's daughter. (Seasons 1–5)
- Kelsey (Marissa Blanchard), Lindsay's daughter. (Seasons 1–5)
- Ali (Amy Farrington), quiet, shy, but witty gym worker. (Seasons 1–2, 4)
- Mrs. Belt (Jordan Baker), Ritchie's third grade teacher. (Season 1)
- Stan aka "Sad Dad" (Andy Richter), divorced father who Christine finds herself unable not to sleep with due to a sexual skill that earns him the title "champ". (Seasons 1–3)
- Burton Schaefer (Matt Letscher), Old Christine's on-and-off romantic interest. (Seasons 1–2)
- Pete (Anthony Holiday), ex-husband of Barb. At one point Barb and Pete split up temporarily before Barb realizes she doesn't like being alone. However, their marriage gradually dissolves off screen which leads to a bitter divorce during the third season. (Seasons 1–2)
- Mrs. Wilhoite (Mary Beth McDonough), teacher and mean mom at the school. (Seasons 1–5)
- Daniel Harris (Blair Underwood), Ritchie's former 4th grade teacher who is known for being unbelievably handsome. He dates Old Christine after he accepts an offer to teach at another school. Christine has been in love with him for a long time and although dating goes well, the relationship eventually fails due to Christine's time constraints. (Seasons 2–3, 5)
- Jeff Hunter (Scott Bakula), also known as Papa Jeff, originally Christine's love interest, but she soon finds out he is New Christine's father and reluctantly dumps him. At New Christine and Richard's wedding, Jeff and Christine rekindle their relationship. Christine realizes shortly after this he is engaged. (Seasons 2, 4 and 5)
- Mrs. Marcie Nunley (Nancy Lenehan), peppy principal of Ritchie's school. Lenehan, before recurring as Mrs. Nunley, guest starred in season one as a completely different character named Kit. (Seasons 2 and 5)
- Tom (Dave Foley), Richard's work associate who has always had a crush on Old Christine. After he gets sick on their disastrous first date, they bond later in the series, though Christine is not attracted to him. Richard sets them up yet again, and this time Tom offers that Christine use him for his money and help, but Tom leaves her after he finds Christine's attempted seduction as "repulsive". (Seasons 2–3, 5)
- Mike Gay (Tom Papa), Christine's only friend at Westbridge, as he is similar to Christine in that he is not wealthy and is also divorced. (Season 3)
- Lucy (Michaela Watkins), a former patient of Matthew's who is attracted to authority figures. Matthew falls for her and after ending the therapist/patient relationship, the two begin to date. They fall in love and begin a much more serious relationship. They eventually move in together but Lucy's disturbing childlike quirks causes them to break up. (Seasons 4–5)
- Patrick Harris (Tim DeKay), Old Christine's new boyfriend, who she meets in a video store and starts dating. Patrick turns out to have some serious rage issues when he "loses" at something, and Christine breaks up with him. (Season 4)
- Principal Merrow (Stephen Tobolowsky), Westbridge Middle School's principal, who has very little tolerance for Old Christine's neurotic behavior. (Season 4)
- Dave (James Lesure), a man Barb meets at Richard and New Christine's wedding. Although he originally tries to deport her as he is an INS agent, he later finds a way to keep her in the country because of his feelings for her. He later ends up being afraid of her and hating her personality as their relationship progresses. He proposes to her, believing that she will break up with him, but she ends up saying yes. (Seasons 4–5)
- Max (Eric McCormack), Old Christine's therapist/crush and Matthew's mentor. Christine and Max share a mutual attraction, but Christine decides she needs a therapist more than she needs a boyfriend. Max has had his license suspended multiple times for getting too close to patients, but after he and Christine end their therapist sessions in order to date each other, he proves to be a calm and steady boyfriend. The two become engaged but Christine postpones their engagement so that she can go back to college. (Season 5)

== Episodes ==
Season	Episodes	Originally released	
Season	Episodes	First released	Last released
1	13	March 13, 2006	May 22, 2006
2	22	September 18, 2006	May 7, 2007
3	10	February 4, 2008	March 31, 2008
4	22	September 24, 2008	May 20, 2009
5	21	September 23, 2009	May 12, 2010

== Reception ==
=== Critical reception ===
"While it occasionally runs to the absurd – a blind date who won't eat food other people have touched and brings his own chicken to a restaurant – it stays for the most part within the realm of recognizable human relations, and lets you feel something for its characters. This was not a luxury Seinfeld ever afforded anyone, and it's nice to see the star getting to play something less cerebrally conceived, less obsessive-compulsive and more ordinarily well-rounded."

— The New Adventures of Old Christine crew about the series

The New Adventures of Old Christine received mixed-to-positive reviews from critics for its witty writing and performances, with high praise directed towards Julia Louis-Dreyfus's performance.

The series holds an 89% approval rating on Rotten Tomatoes, based on 36 reviews, with an average score of 7.4/10. The site's critics' consensus reads: "Louis-Dreyfus shines in this well-paced sitcom, making the awkwardness of Old Christine feel refreshingly genuine." Metacritic assigned the show a score of 64 out of 100, based on 26 critics, indicating "generally favorable" reviews.

A Los Angeles Times review notes that "Louis-Dreyfus makes Christine feel fresh and real" and the show has a "dry charm and a nice tone of affectionate irony."

=== Nielsen ratings and broadcast history ===
The show's initial ratings success was the first example of a show breaking the "Seinfeld curse" (after the failures of The Michael Richards Show, Bob Patterson, Listen Up, and Louis-Dreyfus' own Watching Ellie). The series premiere reached 15.1 million viewers. Old Christines time slot was changed mid-way through the second season, with a decline in ratings after losing its Two and a Half Men lead-in.

On May 16, 2007, it was announced that, despite the decline in ratings, CBS would renew the show for a third season 2007–2008 as a mid-season replacement. On November 6, 2007, CBS said that production of Old Christine had been halted because of a strike by the Writers Guild of America. On December 13, 2007 CBS announced that the series would return for its third season, which premiered on February 4, 2008, replacing Rules of Engagement. However, only 10 episodes of the original 13-episode order were produced and aired for the third season because of the WGA strike.

On May 14, 2008, CBS gave the sitcom a 22-episode order for the 2008–2009 season, where it aired on Wednesdays, opening up a second comedy night for the network. Only 6.7 million viewers tuned in to the premiere. The following week, despite not having to go up against ratings success Dancing with the Stars, ratings tip-toed up, as it added a few hundred thousand. By the third episode, the show was over 7.5 million and had added more than one million to the premiere audience. Since then, the fourth season Old Christine had ratings close to 8 million viewers, and came first in its time slot multiple times.

The early ratings for the fifth season had been lower than previous seasons, but the 14th episode of the season reached 8.3 million viewers, the highest viewership the show had received in the Wednesday night timeslot. CBS cancelled The New Adventures of Old Christine after five seasons in May 2010.

Season	Time slot (ET)	Premiered	Ended	TV season	Rank	Viewers (million)
1	Monday 9:30 (Episodes 2-4, 6-11, 13); Monday 8:30 (Episodes 1, 5, 12)	March 13, 2006	May 22, 2006	2005–2006	#29	12.57
2	Monday 9:30 (Episodes 1-14); Monday 8:00 (Episode 15); Monday 8:30 (Episodes 16-22)	September 18, 2006	May 7, 2007	2006–2007	#39	11.77
3	Monday 9:30 (Episodes 1-5, 7-10); Monday 8:30 (Episode 6)	February 4, 2008	March 31, 2008	2007–2008	#42	10.41
4	Wednesday 8:00	September 24, 2008	May 20, 2009	2008–2009	#77	7.25
5	Wednesday 8:00	September 23, 2009	May 12, 2010	2009–2010	#66	6.74

== Awards and nominations ==
Year	Award	Title	Recipient	Result
2006	Primetime Emmy Awards	Outstanding Lead Actress in a Comedy Series	Julia Louis-Dreyfus	Won
2006	Primetime Emmy Awards	Outstanding Cinematography for a Multi-Camera Series	Gregg Heschong	Nominated
2006	Satellite Awards	Best Actress – Television Series Musical or Comedy	Julia Louis-Dreyfus	Nominated
2007	Art Directors Guild Award	Best Production Design for a Multi-Camera Series	Cabot McMullen	Nominated
2007	Gold Derby Awards	Best Actress in a Comedy Series	Julia Louis-Dreyfus	Nominated
2007	Golden Globe Awards	Best Actress in a TV Series – Musical or Comedy	Julia Louis-Dreyfus	Nominated
2007	Humanitas Prize	30 Minute Category	Jennifer Crittenden	Won
2007	Primetime Emmy Awards	Outstanding Lead Actress in a Comedy Series	Julia Louis-Dreyfus	Nominated
2007	Satellite Awards	Best Actress – Television Series Musical or Comedy	Julia Louis-Dreyfus	Nominated
2007	Screen Actors Guild Awards	Outstanding Performance by a Female Actor in a Comedy Series	Julia Louis-Dreyfus	Nominated
2008	Gold Derby Awards	Best Actress in a Comedy Series	Julia Louis-Dreyfus	Nominated
2008	NAACP Image Awards	Outstanding Supporting Actor in a Comedy Series	Blair Underwood	Nominated
2008	Primetime Emmy Awards	Outstanding Lead Actress in a Comedy Series	Julia Louis-Dreyfus	Nominated
2008	Primetime Emmy Awards	Outstanding Art Direction for a Multi-Camera Series	Cabot McMullen, Amy Feldman	Nominated
2008	Satellite Awards	Best Actress – Television Series Musical or Comedy	Julia Louis-Dreyfus	Nominated
2008	Women's Image Network Awards	Outstanding Actress in a Comedy Series	Julia Louis-Dreyfus	Won
2008	Women's Image Network Awards	Outstanding Comedy Series	Kari Lizer	Won
2008	Young Artist Awards	Best Performance in a TV Series - Young Actor Age Ten or Younger	Trevor Gagnon	Nominated
2009	GLAAD Media Awards	Outstanding Individual Episode	Frank Pines	Won
2009	Gold Derby Awards	Best Actress in a Comedy Series	Julia Louis-Dreyfus	Nominated
2009	NAACP Image Awards	Outstanding Supporting Actor in a Comedy Series	Blair Underwood	Nominated
2009	NAACP Image Awards	Outstanding Supporting Actress in a Comedy Series	Wanda Sykes	Nominated
2009	Primetime Emmy Awards	Outstanding Lead Actress in a Comedy Series	Julia Louis-Dreyfus	Nominated
2009	Primetime Emmy Awards	Outstanding Art Direction for a Multi-Camera Series	Cabot McMullen, Amy Feldman	Nominated
2010	Primetime Emmy Awards	Outstanding Lead Actress in a Comedy Series	Julia Louis-Dreyfus	Nominated
2010	Primetime Emmy Awards	Outstanding Art Direction for a Multi-Camera Series	Cabot McMullen, Amy Feldman	Nominated
2010	Screen Actors Guild Awards	Outstanding Performance by a Female Actor in a Comedy Series	Julia Louis-Dreyfus	Nominated

=== Adaptation ===
The New Adventures of Old Christine was adapted in Germany in 2013. The series is named Christine. Perfekt war gestern! and was canceled after its first season.

== Home media ==
DVD Name	Episodes	Discs	Release dates		
DVD Name	Episodes	Discs	Region 1	Region 2	Region 4
The Complete First Season	13	2	January 15, 2008	July 23, 2008	March 13, 2018
The Complete Second Season	22	4	June 24, 2008	October 21, 2008	TBA
The Complete Third Season	10	2	July 27, 2010	September 15, 2010	TBA
The Complete Fourth Season	22	5	December 7, 2010	February 10, 2011	TBA
The Complete Fifth and Final Season	21	3	February 21, 2012	February 28, 2012	TBA
