= Christine Campbell (character) =

American sitcom character

- Christine Campbell
- First appearance: "Pilot" (episode 1.01)
- Last appearance: "Get Smarter" (episode 5.21)
- Portrayed by: Julia Louis-Dreyfus

In-universe information
- Nickname: Pooder (only mentioned in Season 1 episode 8 "Teach Your Children Well"), Old Christine, C-Cup Kimble (only mention in Season 4 episode 13 "Notes on a 7th Grade Scandal")
- Gender: Female
- Occupation: Gym owner
- Family: Angela Kimble (mother); Larry Kimble (father); Matthew Kimble (brother)
- Spouse: Richard Campbell (ex-husband); Barbara "Barb" Baran (ex-wife)
- Children: Ritchie Campbell

Christine "Old Christine" Campbell (née Kimble) is the title character of The New Adventures of Old Christine, portrayed by Julia Louis-Dreyfus in her Primetime Emmy Award winning role. The series surrounds her as she starts to live a more complicated daily life when her ex-husband dates a younger woman, also named Christine. Louis-Dreyfus received critical acclaim for her performance as Christine, winning the Primetime Emmy Award for Outstanding Lead Actress in a Comedy Series in 2006.

== Character history ==
Christine is a divorcee with a young son. Christine's competitive and aggressive nature are common factors that get in the way of her happiness, such as in the episode "Ritchie Has Two Mommies", where she refuses to let her son meet her ex-husband's new girlfriend, fearing he'll like her more. Christine is seen as very self-centered, as she often makes situations revolving around other people about her.

Christine likes to be seen as politically and socially progressive and liberal, but her oblivious attitude towards current events and politics frequently go back to her obsession with American Idol (in which she is so invested that she took to her bed for three days after the elimination of Melinda Doolittle). In "Strange Bedfellows", Christine attempts to get more involved with the world to be a good role model for her son, which goes horribly wrong when she supports a cause sponsored by the oil company. Christine often gets obsessions with celebrities, as her peers have brought up Jon Stewart, and she has brought up people including Jake Gyllenhaal and Taylor Hicks. It's hinted throughout the series that Christine had occasional sexual encounters with women in her college years.

== Character relationships ==
=== Family ===
Richard Campbell (Clark Gregg), Christine's ex-husband and current friend. Richard often criticizes Christine for being too controlling and being a bad role model for their son Ritchie. They remain friends and Christine often gets herself tangled up in his problems, resulting in them being worse.

Matthew Kimble (Hamish Linklater), Christine's brother and uncle of Ritchie. Matthew lives at the house and does as he pleases in exchange for caring for Ritchie when needed. Matthew often finds himself having to tend to Christine's strange problems, issues and ideas.

Ritchie Campbell (Richard Mortimer Campbell, Jr.) (Trevor Gagnon), Christine's son, whom she clearly loves. They have a good relationship but Ritchie prefers to hang out with his dad.

=== Friends ===
Christine "New Christine" Liezl Hunter (Emily Rutherfurd), Richard's girlfriend. Perceived as a dumb blonde, Christine fills herself with feelings of jealousy and hatred for unknown reasons, until made apparent when Christine ruins Richard's birthday when saying that she was better than New Christine. Since then, Christine has hated her for different reasons, such as setting her up with a high school student and moving in with Richard. Christine also slept with "New" Christine's father (Jeff Hunter), a problem circulating through the seasons. In episode 5.20, Christine gives birth to a daughter with Richard, Dakota Christine Hunter-Campbell, who shares a birthday with "Old Christine."

Barbara "Barb" Baran (Wanda Sykes), Christine's best friend and co-owner at the gym. Barb and Christine are seen frequently disagreeing despite their friendship. Barb often goes with people such as Matthew and Richard who make fun of her for various reasons. In the fourth season, when Barb risked deportation, Christine offered to marry her so Barb could stay in the country. Christine was much more enthusiastic about this than Barb was.

Lindsay and Marly (Alex Kapp Horner and Tricia O'Kelley), terrible and lazy moms at Ritchie's school. Continuously criticize Christine because of her fashion sense and the fact that she works. Recently, Christine attempted to befriend them, and although it went well, she later left because they were disrespecting Ritchie. Lindsay, the least cut-throat, defended Christine once when they crashed cars.

== Conception ==
Although Julia Louis-Dreyfus' run on Seinfeld ran for nine seasons, the actress struggled to find success after that sitcom ended. The NBC sitcom Watching Ellie did not last more than two shortened seasons but her role as Christine Campbell on The New Adventures of Old Christine lasted five full seasons on CBS until it was cancelled in May 2010. During the show's run, she received five consecutive Primetime Emmy Award nominations and one win.

As Christine Campbell, Louis-Dreyfus plays the part of a mother, a characteristic not present in her previous two roles on television. A mother of two boys herself, Louis-Dreyfus has said she enjoys playing Christine Campbell, who coincidentally enough has a young boy of about the same age as her real-life children. Also, both Louis-Dreyfus and her character are environmentalists, and both drive hybrid cars.

Lindsay Soll writes, "In addition to her emotional baggage, The New Adventures of Old Christine’s mom (Julia Louis-Dreyfus) totes Julie K's leather 'Rianne' purse."
