= Work with Me =

- Genre: Sitcom
- Created by: Stephen Engel
- Starring: Kevin Pollak; Nancy Travis; Ethan Embry; Emily Rutherford; Bray Poor
- Theme music composer: David Foster
- Composer: Jonathan Wolff
- Country of origin: United States
- Original language: English
- No. of seasons: 1
- No. of episodes: 9 (5 unaired)

Production
- Executive producers: Stephen Engel; Michael Curtis; Lucy Webb; Kevin Pollak; Nancy Travis; Pamela Fryman
- Producer: John Ziffren
- Running time: 30 minutes
- Production companies: Stephen Engel Productions; Calm Down Productions; Nat's Eye Productions; CBS Productions; Universal Studios Network Programming

Original release
- Network: CBS
- Release: September 29 – October 20, 1999

Work with Me is an American sitcom television series starring Kevin Pollak and Nancy Travis as two attorneys who are married and work together in Manhattan. The series premiered September 29, 1999, on CBS until October 20, 1999. Due to low ratings, the show was cancelled after four episodes.

== Characters ==
- Jordan Better (Kevin Pollak)
- Julie Better (Nancy Travis)
- Sebastian (Ethan Embry)
- Stacy (Emily Rutherfurd)
- A.J. (Bray Poor)
- Murray Epstein (Ted McGinley)
- Cashman (William Bogert)
- Sullivan (Harrison Young)

== Reception ==
Howard Rosenberg of the Los Angeles Times stated that the series is "forgettable, nothing really to like or dislike about mundane marrieds Julie and Jordan Better in a debut that offers no compelling reason to tune in again".

== Episodes ==
No.	Title	Directed by	Written by	Original release date	Prod. code
1	"Pilot"	Pamela Fryman	Stephen Engel	September 29, 1999	TBA
2	"The Best Policy"	Andrew D. Weyman	Sheila R. Lawrence	October 6, 1999	103
3	"Time Apart"	Andrew D. Weyman	Michael Curtis	October 13, 1999	105
4	"Crush"	Andrew D. Weyman	Bill Kunstler	October 20, 1999	104
5	"Til Death Do Us Part"	Andrew D. Weyman	Lucy Webb	Unaired	101
6	"The Reception"	Pamela Fryman	Stephen Engel	Unaired	102
7	"Better Legal Advice"	Andrew D. Weyman	Lucy Webb	Unaired	106
8	"Thanksgiving"	Bob Saget	Stephen Engel	Unaired	107
9	"Daddy's Little Lawyer"	Pamela Fryman	Stephen Engel	Unaired	108
