= Amy Farrington =

American actress and model

- Born: September 20, 1966 (age 59); Boston, Massachusetts, United States
- Occupations: Actress, model
- Years active: 1998–present

External image
- Farrington in 2019.

Amy Farrington (born September 20, 1966) is an American actress and model who is best known for her roles as Stacey Devers on The Michael Richards Show and Detective Lt. Piper Lynch in the CBS drama series S.W.A.T..

== Biography ==
Farrington was born in Boston, Massachusetts to Ann (née Settle; 1938–2009) and Phillip Farrington but was raised in Garland, a suburb of Dallas, Texas. She has one brother and one sister. After attending a musical theatre conservatory program she worked in local and regional theatres before moving to Chicago. In Chicago, she performed at several theaters including the Bailiwick Repertory Theatre,(Son of Fire, 1993) The Court Theatre and the Steppenwolf Theatre. Twenty plays later she moved to Los Angeles. Her first job was as a series regular in a pilot for NBC, followed by the series, The Michael Richards Show (2000), for the same network. She then went on to star in pilots for several networks and guest-starred and recurred on numerous sitcoms including Will & Grace (1998), Just Shoot Me! (1997), Malcolm in the Middle (2000), Two and a Half Men (2003), The King of Queens (1998), The New Adventures of Old Christine (2006) and Young Sheldon (2018).

On July 8, 2019, Farrington joined the cast of S.W.A.T. in the role of Detective Lt. Piper Lynch, who is a tactical consultant to S.W.A.T.

== Filmography ==
=== Film ===
Year	Title	Role	Notes
2000	Bored Silly	Ms. Brandt	
2001	Me & My Needs		TV movie
2001	Soul Survivors	ER Doctor - Midtown	
2002	Julie Lydecker		
2005	East of Normal, West of Weird		TV movie
2009	Exit 19	Katie	TV movie
2009	Hatching Pete	Doris Ivey	TV movie
2009	Ill-Advised	Karen Kessler	TV movie
2013	Ending Up	Terri	Short
2013	The Beating	ER Doctor	
2014	Cloud 9	Andrea Cloud	TV movie
2017	Special Unit	Principal Kate	

=== Television ===
Year	Title	Role	Notes
1997–1999	Early Edition	Harper / Doctor	Episodes: "Downsized" & "Blowing Up Is Hard to Do"
1998	ER	Sandy Mader	Episode: "Of Past Regret and Future Fear"
1998	Cupid	Stroller	Episode: "End of an Eros"
2000	The Michael Richards Show	Stacey Devers	7 episodes
2001	Providence	Liza Gruber	Episode: "Impulse Control"
2001–2002	Malcolm in the Middle	Karen	Episodes: "Book Club" & "Cynthia's Back"
2002	Becker	Judy	Episode: "It Had to Be Ew"
2002	The Drew Carey Show	Bonnie	Episode: "Hickory Dickory... Double Date"
2003	Happy Family	Susan	Episodes: "Tooth" & "Over and Out"
2003	Just Shoot Me!	Michelle	Episode: "Strange Bedfellows" & "Guess Who's Coming to Blush"
2003	Good Morning, Miami	Erika	Episode: "Looking for Love in All the Wrong Cages"
2004	Will & Grace	Phyllis	Episode: "Fred Astaire and Ginger Chicken"
2004	The King of Queens	Emily	Episode: "Tank Heaven"
2004	Two and a Half Men	Kathleen	Episode: "Just Like Buffalo"
2004	Still Standing	Emmy	Episode: "Still Winning"
2004	Center of the Universe	Marcia Weaver	Episode: "And the Silver Medal Goes To..."
2005	Yes, Dear	Pam	Episode: "A Little Breathing Room"
2005	Stacked	Marcy	Episode: "An Ex-Appeal"
2005	The War at Home	Arlene - Brenda's Mother	Episode: "Cheers"
2006	Twins	Patty	Episode: "Dancin' & Pantsin'"
2006–2008	The New Adventures of Old Christine	Ali	4 episodes
2007	Cavemen	Mrs. Collins	Episode: "The Mascot"
2007	Saving Grace	Faye	Episode: "This Is Way Too Normal for You"
2008	Back to You	Margaret	Episodes: "Date Night" & "The Wall of Fame"
2008	Bones	Kate McNutt	Episode: "The Passenger in the Oven"
2009	The Middle	Gail	Episode: "Pilot"
2009	Nip/Tuck	Abigail Sullivan	Episode: "Abigail Sullivan"
2009–2011	Hung	Mindy Saline	4 episodes
2010	Grey's Anatomy	Mary May	Episode: "Shiny Happy People"
2011	Private Practice	Lisa - Abe's daughter	Episode: "Heaven Can Wait"
2011	The Mentalist	Melinda Drew	Episode: "Red Gold"
2011	The Protector	Kathleen Monroe	Episodes: "Pilot" & "Beef"
2011	Harry's Law	Nurse Eileen O'Malley	Episode: "Purple Hearts"
2012	The Neighbors	Tracy	Episode: "Things Just Got Real"
2012	American Horror Story: Asylum	Mrs. Reynolds	Episode: "The Origins of Monstrosity"
2012–2013	Jessie	Ms. Devlin	Episodes: "Make New Friends, But Hide the Old" & "Diary of a Mad Newswoman"
2013	Marvin Marvin	Ms. Hinkle	Episode: Marvin & The Cool Kids
2013	Crash & Bernstein	Ms. Harris	Episode: "Crashus Maximus"
2013	Scandal	Tammy Blakely	Episode: "A Woman Scorned"
2013	The Millers	Phone Clerk	Episode: "The Phone Upgrade"
2014	The McCarthys	Aunt Jean	Episode: "Love, McCarthys Style"
2014–2016	Faking It	Molly Ashcroft	13 episodes
2015	The Librarians	Amy's Mom	Episode: "And the Rule of Three"
2016	2 Broke Girls	Leila	Episode: "And the Partnership Hits the Fan"
2016	Mike & Molly	Karen	Episode: "The Adoption Option"
2016	Vice Principals	Principal Cavanaugh	Episodes: "Run for the Money"
2017	Mom	June	Episode: "Wind Chimes and a Bottomless Pit of Sadness"
2017	NCIS: Los Angeles	Genevive Parks	Episode: "Getaway"
2017	Man with a Plan	Librarian	Episodes: "Dirty Money"
2017	GLOW	Mallory	Episodes: "Pilot" & "The Liberal Chokehold"
2017	The Mick	Miss Crandall	Episodes: "The Invention"
2018	Beyond	Special Agent Gale Borden	5 episodes
2018	Young Sheldon	Dr. Sandra Thorpe	Episode: "A Research Study and Czechoslovakian Wedding Pastries"
2019	American Princess	Dr. Bloom	Episode: "A Period Piece"
2019–2021	S.W.A.T.	Lieutenant Piper Lynch	Series regular (season 3), Recurring role (season 4)
2023	9-1-1: Lone Star	Chief Reynolds	Episode: "Sellouts"
2023	Upload	Cheyenne	2 episodes
2024	Bob Hearts Abishola	Dr. Bradford	Episode: "Tayo Time"
