= Kari Lizer =

American actress (born 1961)

- Born: August 26, 1961 (age 65); San Diego, California, U.S.
- Occupations: Actress; director; producer; writer
- Years active: 1968–2010; 2019–present
- Known for: Matlock; The New Adventures of Old Christine
- Spouse: Robert Romanus (m. 1994, divorced)
- Children: 3

Kari Lizer (born August 26, 1961) is an American actress, writer, and producer.

== Life and career ==
Lizer was born in San Diego, California.

She was the creator and executive producer of the CBS sitcom The New Adventures of Old Christine. In May 2010, CBS canceled Old Christine after five seasons. Upon its cancellation, Lizer slammed the network and suggested the decision to cancel the show was sexist. Previously, she had been co-executive producer of Will & Grace for three years, for which she was nominated for the Emmy Awards in the Outstanding Comedy Series category.

Lizer also created the comedy Maggie Winters.

As an actress, Lizer played Cassie Phillips on Matlock, Diana Benedict on Sunday Dinner, and Chris Burgess on The Van Dyke Show.

In April 2020, Lizer released her first book, Aren't You Forgetting Someone?: Essays from My Mid-Life Revenge.

== Selected filmography ==
=== Acting ===
- Smokey Bites the Dust (1981)
- Private School (1983)
- Gotcha! – Muffy (1985)
- Matlock – Episode: "The Angel" – Margaret Danello (AKA Angel) (1986)
- Growing Pains – Episode: "Born Free" – Stewardess (1987)
- Who's the Boss? – Episode: "There Goes the Bride" – Christy Robinson Everett (1987)
- Matlock – Cassie Phillips (1987–1988)
- The Van Dyke Show – Chris Burgess (1988)
- Quantum Leap – Episode 1.5: "How the Tess Was Won" – Tess McGill (1989)
- Father Dowling Mysteries – Episode: "The Substitute Sister Mystery" – Vickie (1991)
- Diagnosis Murder – Episode: "Death By Extermination" – Lena Prossor (1994)
- Weird Science (5 episodes 1994–1996)
- Breast Men (1997)
- Will & Grace (5 episodes 2001–2004)

=== Crew ===
Numbers in Producing and writing credits refer to number of episodes.

| Year | Title | Credited as | | | Network | Notes |
| Year | Title | Creator | Writer | Executive Producer | Network | Notes |
|---|---|---|---|---|---|---|
| 1994 | Benders | No | Yes (1) | No | N/A | |
| 1994 | Empty Nest | No | Yes (1) | No | CBS | |
| 1994–1997 | Weird Science | No | Yes (1) | No | USA Network | |
| 1996–1997 | Boston Common | No | Yes (3) | No | NBC | |
| 1997 | Honey, I Shrunk the Kids: The TV Show | No | Yes (1) | consulting | Syndication | |
| 1997 | For Your Love | No | Yes (1) | co-producer | NBC | |
| 1998–1999 | Maggie Winters | Yes | Yes (3) | Yes | CBS | |
| 1998–1999 | Work with Me | No | No | consulting | CBS | |
| 2000–2004 | Will & Grace | No | Yes (16) | co-executive | NBC | Also consulting |
| 2006–2010 | The New Adventures of Old Christine | Yes | Yes (15) | Yes | CBS | |
| 2019 | Man with a Plan | No | No | No | CBS | Director: "Adam's Ribs" |
| 2021 | Call Your Mother | Yes | Yes (2) | Yes | ABC | |
