= Alex Kapp Horner =

American actor and writer

Alex Kapp
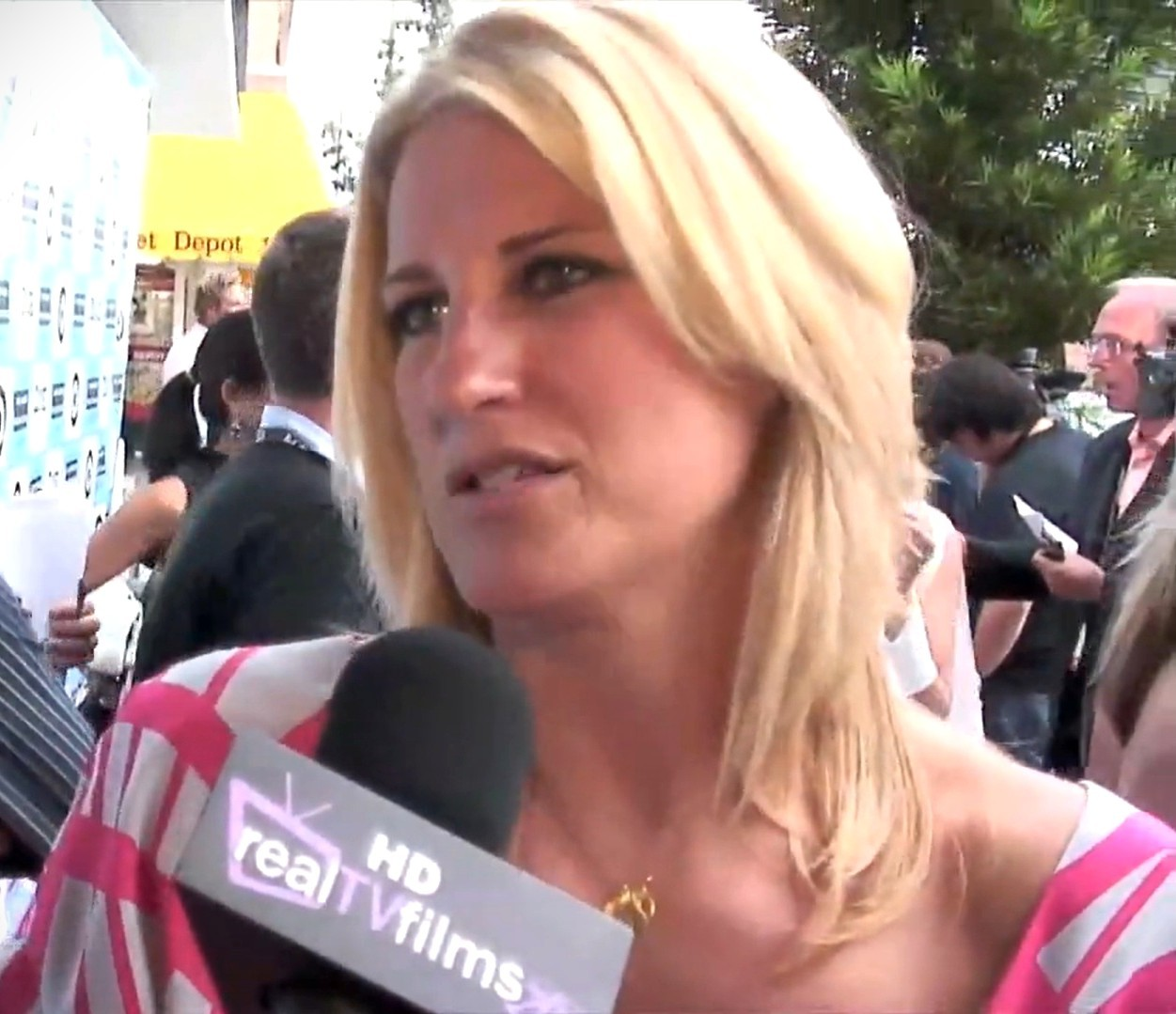
- Kapp in 2009
- Occupation: Actress
- Years active: 1994–present

Alex Kapp (formerly Alex Kapp Horner) is an American television actress and writer, best known for her role as Lindsay on the CBS sitcom The New Adventures of Old Christine (2006–10).

== Career ==
Kapp began her career in Los Angeles as a member of The Groundlings comedy troupe. In mid-1990s she began appearing on television shows, including Party of Five, JAG, Seinfeld, Friends, ER and Will & Grace. She also appeared in the television movie A Mother's Prayer (1995) with Linda Hamilton, and from 1998 to 1999 was regular cast member on the short-lived sitcom Maggie Winters.

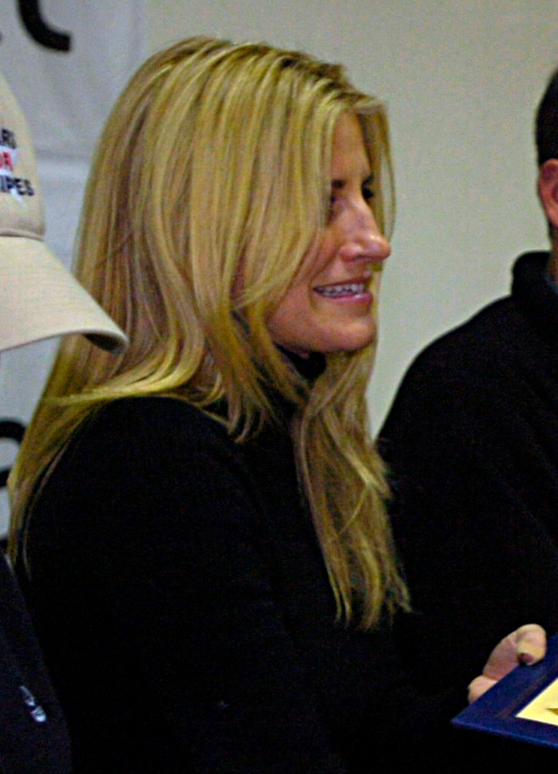
Kapp in Iraq in 2007

From 2006 to 2010, Kapp co-starred opposite Julia Louis-Dreyfus in her sitcom The New Adventures of Old Christine on CBS. She also had supporting role in the 2009 comedy film Weather Girl starring Tricia O'Kelley, her The New Adventures of Old Christine co-star. The following years, she guest-starred on Happy Endings, Drop Dead Diva, Two and a Half Men, I Didn't Do It, and Baby Daddy. In 2013, she was cast as female lead in the Fox comedy series Surviving Jack opposite Christopher Meloni, but was fired after one episode. Rachael Harris replaced her.

== Personal life ==
Kapp grew up in New York City, her father a conductor and her mother an opera singer. She graduated from Dartmouth College with a degree in history. Prior to her acting career, she gained notoriety as Robert Chambers' girlfriend at the time of the 1986 preppy murder scandal. Kapp appears in the documentary The Preppy Murder: Death in Central Park.

== Filmography ==
=== Film ===
Year	Title	Role	Notes
1995	Professional Affair	Janine	Direct-to-video
2005	Lucky 13	Woman Home Buyer	
2009	Weather Girl	Emily	

=== Television ===
Year	Title	Role	Notes
1994	Deconstructing Sarah	Receptionist	Television film
1995	A Mother's Prayer	Martha	Television film
1996	Party of Five	Maureen	Episode: "Short Cuts"
1997	Lost on Earth	Girl in Bar	Episode #1.3
1997	JAG	Radar Operator	Episode: "Vanished"
1998	Seinfeld	Maura	Episode: "The Strongbox"
1998–1999	Maggie Winters	Lisa Harte	16 episodes
1999	Friends	Stephanie	Episode: "The One Where Ross Hugs Rachel"
1999	It's Like, You Know...	Wendy	Episode: "Hollywood Shuffle"
2001	ER	Brenda	Episode: "April Showers"
2001	Spin City	Karen	Episode: "You've Got Male"
2001	Will & Grace	Alice Robinson	Episode: "Alice Doesn't Lisp Here Anymore"
2002	Presidio Med	Fertility Doctor	Episode: "Good Question"
2003	Rock Me Baby	Lorraine	Episode: "Pretty in Pink Eye"
2003	These Guys	Marisa	Television film
2006–2010	The New Adventures of Old Christine	Lindsay	45 episodes; also writer (1 episode)
2011	Happy Endings	Kelly	Episode: "Baby Steps"
2012	Drop Dead Diva	Megan Walsh	Episode: "Lady Parts"
2014	Two and a Half Men	Donna	Episode: "Lotta Delis in Little Armenia"
2014	I Didn't Do It	Nora Watson	3 episodes
2015, 2016	Baby Daddy	Jennifer Perrin	2 episodes
2016	Sweet/Vicious	Bobbi Mayer	Episode: "Tragic Kingdom"
2017	Tight	Candice Martin	Episode: "Pilot"
2018	The Mick	Troy's Mom	Episode: "The Accident"
2019	The Preppy Murder: Death in Central Park	Herself	3 episodes; documentary miniseries
2023	Star Trek: Strange New Worlds	Voice of Enterprise computer	Multiple episodes
