= Emily Rutherfurd =

American actress

- Born: Emily Kernan Rutherfurd; 1974 or 1975 (age 51–52); New York City, U.S.
- Education: Convent of the Sacred Heart; St. Mark's School
- Alma mater: University of Southern California
- Occupation: Actress
- Years active: 1999–present
- Spouse: Loch Gallagher (m. 2003)
- Relatives: Lewis Polk Rutherfurd (uncle); Janet Auchincloss Rutherfurd (aunt); Levi P. Morton (paternal grandfather's maternal grandfather)

Emily Kernan Rutherfurd (born 1974 or 1975) is an American actress. She played Christine "New Christine" Hunter in the CBS sitcom The New Adventures of Old Christine (2006–2010).

== Early life ==
Rutherfurd is the daughter of Mary Spratt (née Kernan) Rutherfurd and Winthrop Rutherfurd Jr., himself the grandson of New York socialite Winthrop Rutherfurd (1862–1944). Her paternal uncle is Lewis Polk Rutherfurd (b. 1944) who was married to Janet Jennings Auchincloss (1945–1985), the half-sister of former First Lady Jacqueline Kennedy Onassis. A maternal aunt is Emily Rafferty.

She attended Sacred Heart school on the Upper East Side. She also attended St. Mark's School in Southborough, Massachusetts. She then attended the University of Southern California in Los Angeles.

== Career ==
Rutherfurd made her television debut in 1999 as a series regular on the short-lived CBS sitcom Work with Me opposite Nancy Travis and Kevin Pollak. Later, she was a regular cast member on The Ellen Show and Married to the Kellys. She played Christine "New Christine" Hunter on the CBS sitcom The New Adventures of Old Christine which aired from 2006 to 2010 and also starred Julia Louis-Dreyfus. She had the lead role in Work Mom.

Rutherfurd starred in several television pilots, including The Assistants opposite Heather Locklear and an untitled comedy written by Ben Falcone. She had a recurring role on Will & Grace as a student in Jack McFarland's acting class, and also guest-starred on Last Man Standing, Drop Dead Diva and Hot in Cleveland. Her feature film credits include Elizabethtown, Van Wilder, and Pain & Gain.

== Personal life ==
Rutherfurd lives with her husband, Rollin McCulloch "Loch" Gallagher IV, whom she married in 2003. They have two daughters.

== Filmography ==
=== Film ===
Year	Title	Role	Notes
1999	Loves Me Loves Me Not	Sandy Erickson	Short film
2002	Van Wilder	Jeannie	
2005	Elizabethtown	Cindy Hasboro	
2006	The Pity Card		Short film
2006	Derek & Simon: A Bee and a Cigarette	Sandy	Short film
2013	Pain & Gain	Carolyn "Cissy" DuBois	

=== Television ===
Year	Title	Role	Notes
1999–2000	Work with Me	Stacy	Series regular, 9 episodes
2000	Live Girls	Kathryn	TV pilot
2001–2002	The Ellen Show	Catherine Richmond	Series regular, 18 episodes
2003	Coupling	Sally	TV pilot
2003–2004	Married to the Kellys	Mary Kelly	Series regular, 21 episodes
2002–2005	Will & Grace	Joanne	Recurring role, 4 episodes
2006–2010	The New Adventures of Old Christine	Christine "New Christine" Hunter	Series regular, 52 episodes
2011	The Assistants	Liddy Gribble	TV pilot
2011	Love Bites	Julia Clark	Episode: "Stand and Deliver"
2011	Last Man Standing	Rebecca	Episode: "Guess Who's Coming to Dinner"
2012	Up All Night	Laura	Episode: "Rivals"
2012	Drop Dead Diva	Olivia French	Episode: "Freak Show"
2013	Raising Hope	Kelly	Episode: "Yo Zappa Do: Part 2"
2013	Work Mom	Eden	TV pilot
2014	Hot in Cleveland	Jodie / Melanie	Episode: "Playmates"
2015	Impastor	Marla Simmons	Episode: "Genesis"
2016–2017	The Middle	Dierdre Peterson	3 episodes
2017	Veep	Sally Newfeld	Episode: "Groundbreaking"
2018	Grey's Anatomy	Helen Karev	Episode: "Old Scars, Future Hearts"
