= Tricia O'Kelley =

American actress (born 1968)

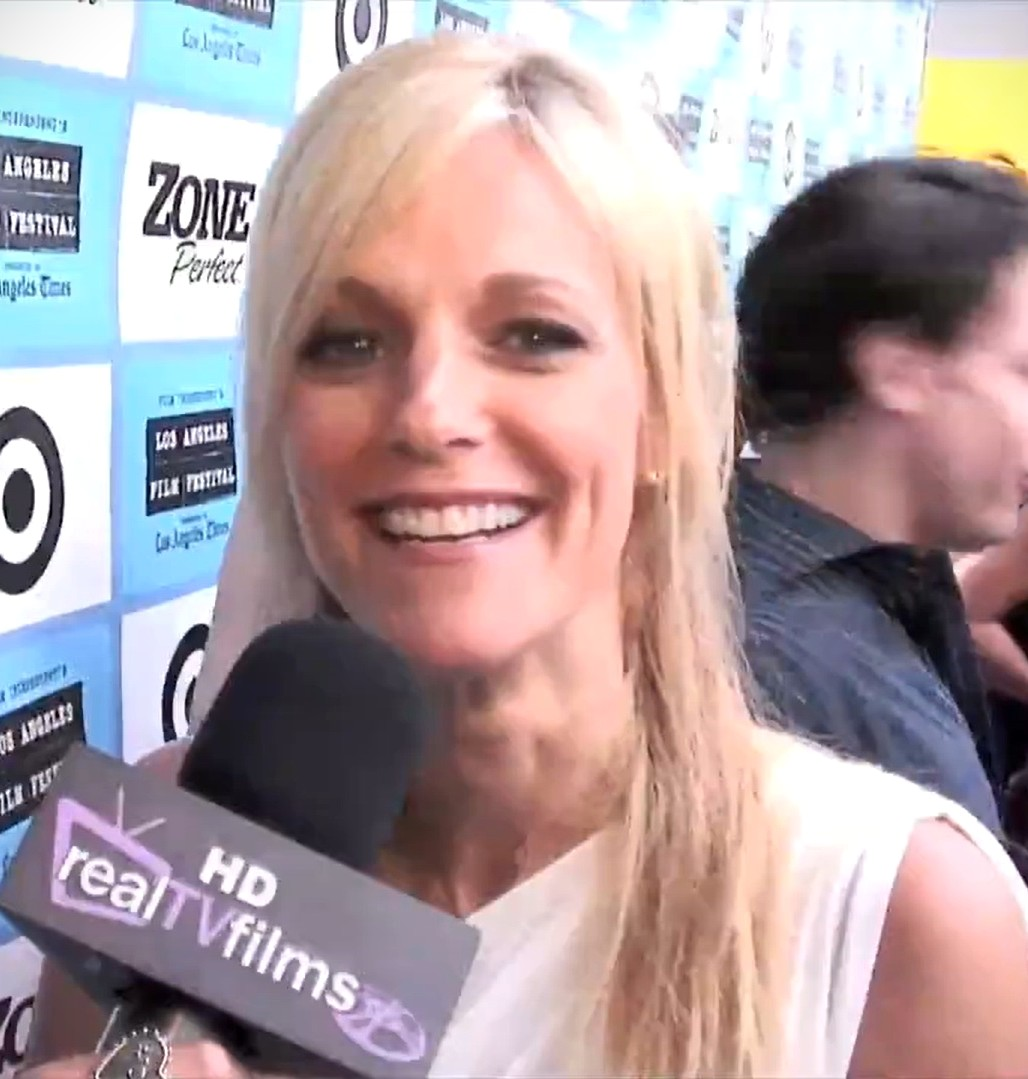
- O'Kelley in 2009
- Born: Patricia Beth O'Kelley; September 26, 1968 (age 58); Melrose, Massachusetts, U.S.
- Occupations: Actress, producer
- Years active: 1998–present
- Children: 2

Patricia Beth O'Kelley (born September 26, 1968) is an American actress and producer, best recognized as Marly Ehrhardt on the CBS sitcom The New Adventures of Old Christine (2006–10). She may also be known for her recurring role as Nicole Leahy on The WB television series Gilmore Girls (2003–04) as well as the lead role in the independent comedy film Weather Girl (2009).

== Career ==
O'Kelley began her acting career in commercials. In the 1990s, she founded a resource center for aspiring actors in Chicago that provided workshops, career consultations and seminars. As of the late 1990s, she began her career on television, including guest-starring roles on Frasier, Suddenly Susan, Everybody Loves Raymond, Two and a Half Men, CSI: Crime Scene Investigation, Back to You, Malcolm in the Middle, and starring roles in the short-lived series Emeril and That Was Then. She also had a recurring role in The WB family drama series Gilmore Girls, portraying Luke's girlfriend and "short-term wife", Nicole Leahy, from 2003 to 2004.

O'Kelley is best known for her portrayal of Marly Ehrhardt on the CBS sitcom The New Adventures of Old Christine, opposite Julia Louis-Dreyfus, from 2006 to 2010. In 2009, she also starred and executive produced the independent film Weather Girl. She later starred in two television pilots, and from 2011 to 2013 had a recurring role as Camille Boykewich in the ABC Family teen drama series, The Secret Life of the American Teenager. In 2013, O'Kelley starred in the Lifetime movie Missing at 17, and in next year was cast for second season of the Lifetime comedy-drama series Devious Maids, as Tanya Taseltof.

== Personal life ==
O'Kelley was born in Melrose, Massachusetts, and grew up in La Grange, Illinois. She graduated from the University of Wisconsin, Madison. She lived in Los Angeles with her husband, Adam, and their two children; as of October 17, 2020, however, Kelley describes herself as "a single mom of two girls." In addition to acting, O'Kelley designs a line of greetings cards called Heartsongs.

== Filmography ==
=== Film ===
Year	Title	Role	Notes
2002	The Gatekeeper	Jennifer McGregory	
2005	Beautiful Things	Leslie	Short film
2006	Outside Sales	Dagny Green	
2007	Table Manners	Tessa	Short film
2007	The Pink Conspiracy	Angela	
2009	Weather Girl	Sylvia	

=== Television ===
Year	Title	Role	Notes
1998	George & Leo	Mary	Episode: "The Bongos"
1998	The Closer (1998 TV series)	Julie	2 episodes
1998	The Love Boat: The Next Wave	Tawny Williams	Episode: "Captains Courageous"
1998	Frasier	Colette	Episode: "Roz, a Loan"
1998	The 900 Lives of Jackie Frye	Susan	TV film
1999	Suddenly Susan	Polly	Episode: "On a Clear Day You Can Hear Forever"
1999	The Hughleys	Debbie	Episode: "Why Can't We Be Friends?"
1999	The Pretender	Carrie Osborne	Episode: "Donoterase: Part 1"
1999	Rude Awakening	Joan	Episode: "Trude Awakening"
1999	Once and Again	Lindsay	Episode: "Let's Spend the Night Together"
1999	Get Real	Amber	Episode: "Big Numbers"
2000	Jack & Jill	Dan	Episode: "Starstruck"
2000	The Trouble with Normal	Nancy	Episode: "Not the Pilot"
2000	The Young and the Restless	Jennifer Crawford	5 episode
2001	Everybody Loves Raymond	Carol Marshall	Episode: "Humm Vac"
2001	FreakyLinks	Jennifer Lowe	2 episodes
2001	Emeril	Trish O'Connell	Recurring role
2002	That Was Fun	Sophie Frisch	3 episodes
2003	Las Vegas	Janet Warner	Episode: "Semper Spy"
2003	CSI: Crime Scene Investigation	Debbie Dunbar	Episode: "Grissom Versus the Volcano"
2003	Two and a Half Men	Brooke	Episode: "The Last Thing You Want Is to Wind Up with a Hump"
2003–2004	Gilmore Girls	Nicole Leahy	Recurring role
2004	Malcolm in the Middle	Mrs. Welsh	2 episodes
2006–2010	The New Adventures of Old Christine	Marly Ehrhardt	Main Cast; 45 episodes
2007	Eyes	Cynthia Garret	Episode: "Whistleblower"
2008	Back to You	Colette	Episode: "Hug & Tell", "House of Tomorrow"
2011	Untitled Jeff and Jackie Filgo Project	Liz	Unsold TV pilot
2011–2013	The Secret Life of the American Teenager	Camille Boykewich	Recurring role
2012	Downwardly Mobile	Mrs. Denby	TV film
2012	Two and a Half Men	Shari	Episode: "Something My Gynecologist Said"
2013	Missing at 17	Shannon	TV film
2014	Melissa & Joey	Sienna	Episode: "The New Deal"
2014	Red Band Society	Daniella	Episode: "Sole Searching"
2014	Devious Maids	Tanya Taseltof	3 episodes
2014	Selfie	Maisy	Episode: "Follow Through"
2015	Truth Be Told	Gloria	Episode: "Psychic Chicken"
2015	Mom	Mrs. Lippert	Episode: "A Pirate, Three Frogs and a Prince"
2016	2 Broke Girls	Marissa	Episode: "And the Partnership Hits the Fan"
2017	Baby Daddy	Dr. Joanne Dobbs	Episode: "A Mother of a Day"
2017	The Mick	Poodle Pemberton	6 episodes, (2 voice-only)
2018	A.P. Bio	Sadie	Episode: "Rosemary's Boyfriend"
2018	It's Always Sunny in Philadelphia	Brenda	Episode: "The Gang Gets New Wheels"
2018	Speechless	Candy Kensington	Episode: "J-I-- JINGLE T-H-- THON"
2019	Good Girls	Lauren	2 episodes
2025–2026	High Potential	Linda Foster	2 episodes
