= Men at Work season 2 =

Men at Work
- Season 2
- No. of episodes: 10

Release
- Original network: TBS
- Original release: April 4 – June 6, 2013

Season chronology
- ← Previous; Season 1 Next → Season 3

The second season of the TBS sitcom Men at Work premiered on April 4, 2013 and concluded on June 6, 2013. A total of ten episodes aired. Season two regular cast members include Danny Masterson, Michael Cassidy, Adam Busch, Meredith Hagner and James Lesure.

== Cast ==
- Danny Masterson as Milo Foster
- Michael Cassidy as Tyler Mitchell
- Adam Busch as Neal Bradford
- James Lesure as Gibbs
- Meredith Hagner as Amy Jordan

=== Recurring ===
- J. K. Simmons as P.J. Jordan
- Peri Gilpin as Alex
- Sarah Wright as Molly
- Stephanie Lemelin as Rachel
- Joel David Moore as Doug

== Production ==
TBS has renewed Men at Work for a 10 episode second season, which premiered on April 4, 2013. Upcoming guest stars for season two include, Peri Gilpin as Alex, the new boss at Full Steam magazine; Sarah Wright as Molly, a girl Milo meets through Missed Connections; Stephanie Lemelin as Rachel; Marsha Thomason as a beautiful British chef; Mark-Paul Gosselaar as Tim, Amy's successful ex-boyfriend; Jessica Szohr as Jenny, Amy's beautiful friend; Seth Green as homeless man; Bethany Joy Lenz as Meg, a single mother who Tyler takes an interest in; Benjamin McKenzie as Meg's ex-husband; Maz Jobrani as the owner of a Lebanese chicken restaurant who befriends Gibbs; Kevin Corrigan as Darryl, a hard rock-loving, chicken wing-eating moonshiner who ends up sitting next to Milo at a wedding reception, and Jason Lee as Donny, an annoying co-worker dubbed a "story troller" by the guys. J. K. Simmons and Joel David Moore return as P.J. Jordan and Doug respectively, whilst John Michael Higgins guests as Lindsey Tucker, P.J's magazine nemesis.

== Episodes ==
No. overall	No. in season	Title	Directed by	Written by	Original release date	Prod. code	U.S. viewers (millions)
11	1	"Missed Connections"	David Trainer	Breckin Meyer	April 4, 2013	201	1.68
Tyler comes up with an ingenious plan to "create" the perfect woman (Sarah Wright) for Milo and help him find an offline love... online. Gibbs experiences a different side of Neal while driving to a family engagement and tries to unleash the beast.
12	2	"Will Work for Milo"	David Trainer	Story by : Morgan Beck; Teleplay by : Breckin Meyer	April 11, 2013	202	1.71
A homeless man (Seth Green) decides to bully Milo to the point of no return. Neal is convinced that he needs to make a relationship power grab, and Amy isn't having any of it. Gibbs takes on a new, more respected position after finding an old pair of glasses. Tyler fakes a job in order to pick up a new customer.
13	3	"The New Boss"	Leonard R. Garner Jr.	Breckin Meyer	April 18, 2013	203	1.82
A new editor (Peri Gilpin) is picked up at Full Steam Magazine, and the boys all do their best to impress. Gibbs' game gets shaky, Neal experiences a colossal confidence boost and Milo tries to get noticed. Meanwhile, Tyler tries to change up his dating style, and it doesn't go quite as well as he'd like to think.
14	4	"Downshift"	Leonard R. Garner Jr.	Kirk Rudell	April 25, 2013	204	1.50
Amy gives Gibbs a puppy to look after and he reluctantly falls into puppy love. Milo gets caught up in a relationship that is moving too fast for everyone to handle. And Neal teaches Tyler a lesson about the perfect hamburger.
15	5	"The Good, the Bad & the Milo"	Steve Zuckerman	Mike Lisbe & Nate Reger	May 2, 2013	205	1.46
Milo decides it is time to break it off with Molly (Sarah Wright), but he doesn't want to leave on bad terms. Tyler and Gibbs don't see eye to eye with the owner (Maz Jobrani) of their favorite restaurant. And Neal is asked to fire an employee, but he doesn't have the guts to do it.
16	6	"Tyler the Pioneer"	Linda Mendoza	Breckin Meyer	May 9, 2013	206	1.75
Tyler decides to be adventurous and date a woman with kids (Bethany Joy Lenz). Meanwhile, Neal, Gibbs and Milo fight over an office that has just been vacated at work.
17	7	"Uncle Gibbs"	Linda Mendoza	Jared Miller	May 16, 2013	207	1.34
Gibbs' nephew Donald (Arjay Smith) comes in town for a medical school interview, but a long night of partying throws off his plans. And Milo opts for a fashion change that really amps up his mojo.
18	8	"The Gibbs-orcism"	Linda Mendoza	Kirk J. Rudell	May 23, 2013	208	1.55
Tyler's new girlfriend (Stephanie Lemelin) is all too familiar to Milo and Gibbs, so they do their best to hide the truth from him. Neal and Amy do their best to avoid the "anniversary curse," but they can't seem to escape their fate.
19	9	"Long Distance Tyler"	Barnet Kellman	Jessica Kaminsky	May 30, 2013	209	1.41
Milo and Gibbs have a date-off with a beautiful woman (Jessica Szohr). Tyler and Rachel try to stick together through the hassles of a long-distance relationship. Neal and Amy suffer the consequences of allowing Tyler to use their apartment as a rendezvous location.
20	10	"Weekend at PJ's"	Barnet Kellman	Breckin Meyer	June 6, 2013	210	1.73
Tyler and Milo get into a roommate fight after Tyler oversteps his bounds. Amy's father does his best to replace Neal with a more accomplished individual named Tim (Mark-Paul Gosselaar). Gibbs searches for a woman who caught his eye at a wedding. And a little bit of moonshine leads to another marriage, much to everyone's surprise.
