= Men at Work season 1 =

Men at Work
- Season 1
- No. of episodes: 10

Release
- Original network: TBS
- Original release: May 24 – July 12, 2012

Season chronology
- Next → Season 2

The first season of the TBS sitcom Men at Work premiered on May 24, 2012, and ended July 12, 2012. A total of ten episodes were produced. Season one regular cast members include Danny Masterson, Michael Cassidy, Adam Busch, Meredith Hagner and James Lesure.

== Cast ==
- Danny Masterson as Milo Foster (10 episodes)
- Michael Cassidy as Tyler Mitchell (10 episodes)
- Adam Busch as Neal Bradford (10 episodes)
- James Lesure as Gibbs (10 episodes)
- Meredith Hagner as Amy Jordan (6 episodes)

=== Recurring ===
- Amy Smart as Lisa (2 episodes)
- J. K. Simmons as P.J. Jordan (1 episode)
- Stephanie Lemelin as Rachel (1 episode)
- Joel David Moore as Doug (1 episode)

== Production ==
On January 6, 2012, TBS picked up Men at Work for a first season of 10 episodes set to premiere on May 24, 2012, at 10 pm. Production on the first season began in April 2012.

Guest stars for season one of Men at Work include, Amy Smart as Lisa, Milo's ex-girlfriend; Julian Morris as Damien; J. K. Simmons as P.J. Jordan, Amy's father and owner of the magazine; Melissa Claire Egan as Jessica, Milo's date; Ethan Suplee as Dan; Stacy Keibler as Keri; Kathy Najimy as Sasha Ryan, a well-known sex blogger; Josh Hopkins as Ryan, a friend of Amy's who is blind; Kevin Pollak as Pavel; Christopher Masterson as a hotel employee; Wilmer Valderrama as Eri Ricaldo; Alexandra Breckenridge as Katelyn, a young woman who keeps blowing off her dates with Tyler; Joel David Moore as Doug, a Full Steam Magazine editor; Laura Prepon as Hannah, Neal's friend who is set up with Milo; William Baldwin as Shepard Peters, a famous, free-spirited, sexually driven photographer, and Richard Riehle as Gus, a man who mistakes Milo for his long-lost war hero family member.

== Episodes ==
| No. overall | No. in season | Title | Directed by | Written by | Original release date | Prod. code | U.S. viewers (millions) |
|---|---|---|---|---|---|---|---|
| 1 | 1 | "Pilot" | Mark Cendrowski | Breckin Meyer | May 24, 2012 | 100 | 2.64 |
When Milo gets dumped, his three best friends try to help him get back into the dating game. Neal tries to talk dirty with Amy. Gibbs has sex with Tyler's maid.
| 2 | 2 | "Milo Full of Grace" | David Trainer | Breckin Meyer | May 24, 2012 | 101 | 2.27 |
Milo, Gibbs and Tyler are on edge when Neal starts cutting costs in the office. Milo goes to jail when he attempts to go the extra mile with his article on drug trafficking. Tyler accidentally runs into his ex-girlfriend.
| 3 | 3 | "Devil's Threesome" | James Widdoes | Lon Zimmet & Dan Rubin | May 31, 2012 | 102 | 2.04 |
Milo and Gibbs participate in a "devil’s threesome" with a woman they meet in the bar. Tyler's feminine side comes out after spending time with Amy. Neal becomes jealous when Tyler's time with Amy starts eclipsing his own.
| 4 | 4 | "Heterotextual Male" | James Widdoes | Breckin Meyer | June 7, 2012 | 103 | 1.87 |
Milo gets advice from the guys and attempts to play it cool. Gibbs and Tyler are surprised when an interview with a sex therapist doesn't go the way they expected. Amy buys Neal a new hat, which causes the whole office to tease him.
| 5 | 5 | "Toilet of Eden" | Mark Cendrowski | Kirk J. Rudell | June 14, 2012 | 104 | 1.73 |
While his apartment is being worked on, Milo stays with Tyler. Gibbs and Neal start jumping to conclusions when they see a photo of Amy with another man.
| 6 | 6 | "Crazy for Milo" | Mark Cendrowski | Eric Weinberg | June 21, 2012 | 105 | 2.11 |
Some tough truth for Gibbs and Tyler are revealed through a lie detection app. Amy and Neal decide to experiment with role-playing. Milo begins dating a girl who turns out to be a bit more kooky than he first thought. Errors: milos still has his own apartment and isn't living with tyler.
| 7 | 7 | "Plan B" | Mark Cendrowski | Jared Miller | June 28, 2012 | 106 | 2.21 |
Gibbs and Tyler attempt to get a membership discount at the gym by pretending to be a couple. Neal sets Milo up with an old friend (guest star Laura Prepon), who ends up having feelings for Neal instead.
| 8 | 8 | "Wake and Bake" | Mark Cendrowski | Joel Church-Cooper & Rene Gube | July 5, 2012 | 107 | 2.06 |
In search of adventure, Tyler and Milo accidentally crash a wake. Gibbs is surprised to find himself attracted to Neal's gamer friends, but he quickly learns the rules of Drogar the hard way when he gets too close to the wrong character.
| 9 | 9 | "Inventing Milo" | Mark Cendrowski | Lon Zimmet & Dan Rubin | July 12, 2012 | 108 | 1.76 |
Giibs finally lands a photo shoot featuring his childhood idol, but when Tyler starts to get buddy-buddy with Gibb's icon, things don't go according to plan. Meanwhile, Neal serves as Milo's guinea pig for an invention that goes terribly awry.
| 10 | 10 | "Super Milo" | Mark Cendrowski | Kirk J. Rudell | July 12, 2012 | 109 | 1.40 |
Determined to get over Lisa once and for all, Milo revives an intense competition that once almost destroyed the guys' friendship. But he is soon forced to make a big decision when Lisa comes back into his life. Neal struggles to prove that he's on a par with the rest of the guys.

== DVD release ==
Men at Work: The Complete First Season
| Set Details | | Special Features |
| 10 episodes; 2-disc set (Region 1); Technical specifications: Anamorphic Widescreen (1.78:1) | | Deleted Scenes; Outtakes |
Release Dates
| Region 1 | Region 2 | Region 4 |
| March 26, 2013 | TBA | TBA |
