= Strange but true =

Strange but true may refer to:

== Literature ==
- "Strange but True", an 1856 poem by Hugh Miller
- Strange but True: From the Files of Fate Magazine, a 2002 book edited by Corrine Kenner and Craig Miller
- Strange but true, a 2005 novel by John Searles

== Music ==
- Strange but True (album), a 1998 album by Jad Fair & Yo La Tengo
- "Strange but True", a 1988 song by Times Two
- "Strange but true", a song by Prince from Rave Un2 the Joy Fantastic

== Television and film ==
- Strange but True?, 1993–97 documentary television series hosted by Michael Aspel
- "Strange but True", the 2004 pilot episode of the Weird U.S. reality television series
- Strange but True (film), a 2019 American noir-thriller
