= Anonymous Rex =

Anonymous Rex may refer to:

- Anonymous Rex (novel), a 2000 novel by Eric Garcia
- Anonymous Rex (film), a 2004 film starring Daniel Baldwin and Sam Trammell
