= Rabideau =

Rabideau may refer to:

- Rabideau CCC Camp, a Civilian Conservation Corps (CCC) camp in Minnesota, United States
- Shawn Rabideau (born 1975), American lifestyle and event planner
