= Teamo Supremo =

American animated television series

- Also known as: Disney's Teamo Supremo
- Genre: Animated series; Superhero; Comedy; Science fiction
- Created by: Phil Walsh
- Written by: Phil Walsh; Ford Riley
- Directed by: Joe Horne
- Voices of: Spencer Breslin; Alanna Ubach; Martin Mull; Fred Willard; Brian Doyle-Murray; Julia Sweeney; Rachel Crane
- Composer: Ian Dye
- Country of origin: United States
- Original language: English
- No. of seasons: 3
- No. of episodes: 39 (76 segments)

Production
- Executive producer: Phil Walsh
- Running time: 11 minutes (regular episodes only); 22 minutes ("Play It Again Songstress!" and "The Mark of Comrade Z")
- Production company: Walt Disney Television Animation

Original release
- Network: ABC (Note: The series stopped airing new episodes by late May, but reruns continued until September 13, 2003.)
- Release: January 19, 2002 – May 31, 2003
- Network: Toon Disney
- Release: August 25, 2002 – August 17, 2004

Teamo Supremo is an American animated television series created by Phil Walsh. Animated in the limited animation style pioneered by Jay Ward and his predecessors who inspired his style, it tells of three superhero children: Captain Crandall, Skate Lad, and Rope Girl.

The series made its broadcast premiere for ABC's Disney's One Saturday Morning block on January 19, 2002, where most of its first season aired. However, it started regularly airing on Toon Disney in September of that same year, where most of its second season premiered. During Spring 2003, about half of its second season premiered on what had been by then rebranded as ABC Kids. On September 13, 2003, it was taken off ABC Kids, leaving the rest of the episodes to premiere on Disney Channel's all-animated, digital cable spinoff Toon Disney (now Disney XD), ending its run by 2004. 39 episodes were made, with 76 total stories (all but two episodes had two 11-minute-long stories slotted in their 22-minute time slot). In Canada, it aired on Family Channel and in Europe, it also aired different non-cable networks along Disney-branded networks.

== Plot ==
Three gradeschool-aged superhero children Captain Crandall, Skate Lad, and Rope Girl (dubbed "Teamo Supremo") protect their state from several villainous, bad people when called in by Governor Kevin. They take on bad people such as Baron Blitz, Madame Snake, Laser Pirate, Helius Inflato, Dehydro, Mr. Large, and other bad people while also occasionally interacting with the other local superheroes.

== Characters ==
=== Teamo Supremo ===
These are the three main characters of the show. None of them are an only child.

- Crandall / Captain Crandall (voiced by Spencer Breslin) is the founder and bespectacled leader of Teamo Supremo, who believes that he is an alien superhero from another planet. He is often addressed as "Cap" by his teammates, and his battle catchphrase is "Buh-Za!" In later episodes, Crandall's seemingly imaginary superpowers and backstory seem to actually become canon. In the last episode of the show, he experiences a sudden burst of superhuman strength and defense. Also, his skin turns purple when he gets very angry. His gadgets include a special Level 7 belt, as well as a yo-yo, marbles, a boomerang, and a shield.
- Hector Felipé Corrio / Skate Lad (voiced by Alanna Ubach) is the Latino member of Teamo Supremo, and the state's skateboarding champion. His main gadget is a patriotic-themed jet-propelled skateboard and his catchphrase is "Chi-Ka!"
- Brenda / Rope Girl (voiced by Alanna Ubach) is the only female member of Teamo Supremo, she has purple pixie cut and a bucktooth and speaks with a Western drawl. Her catchphrase is "Wuh-Pa!", and her gadget is a jump rope, which she uses as a lasso when battling villains, but can also be used to transform herself, Crandall, and Hector into their heroic alter-egos when all three jump rope together.

=== Allies ===
- Governor G. Kevin (voiced by Martin Mull) is the hip, vibrant governor of the unnamed state. He always calls for the title team when necessary and he sometimes has to lend excuse notes if the crime makes Teamo Supremo late for class (or if it means they miss class for the rest of the day).
- Chief Epsilon (voiced by Brian Doyle-Murray) is the chief of police who does not take kindly to Teamo Supremo taking police matters into their own hands, but in time starts working along with them regardless of the title team being kids. He once tried to operate as a costumed superhero himself, using the codename 'Lawman', but made a mix of it since his 'gadgets' consisted of an umbrella and an egg whisk. When arresting villains, the Chief would use some witty remarks about them being taken to prison. The Chief also suffers from Beat Deafness.
- Mrs. Crandall (voiced by Julia Sweeney) is Crandall's human mother. He refers to her as "Earth Mom" since he thinks he is an alien. She is fully oblivious to the fact that Crandall and his friends are superheroes (or so it may seem).
- Jean Crandall (voiced by Rachel Crane) is Crandall's older human sister who is aware of his superhero career. She often gives the team advice, claiming it is necessary if she "wants to be a [career] some day".
- Mr. Paulson (voiced by Fred Willard) is the eccentric director of Level 7, a top-secret facility that makes the title team's gadgets.
- Samantha (voiced by Kim Gillingham) is Paulson's lab assistant.
- Mrs. Woolingantz (voiced by Sydney Walsh) is the Teamo Supremo's teacher who often excuses them if Governor Kevin needs them. She does not assign much homework, but gets angry when it is undone.
- Action (vocal effects provided by Frank Welker) is Crandall's pet dog. He is sometimes called to help the title team in certain missions like Krypto and Ace the Bat-Hound.
- Mrs. Corrio is Hector's mother.
- The Twins are Hector's unnamed twin sisters, who often speak gibberish in unison.
- Brenda's Mother is Brenda's mother, from whom she seems to get her Southern accent.
- Barclae / Diaper Dude is Brenda's infant brother, who once helped Teamo Supremo in one of their adventures. His first spoken word was "Brenda".
- Teamo Supremo's Fathers are the title team's respective fathers, but is unknown much about them as they've only been seen in one episode. Crandall's father seems to read the newspaper a lot and Hector's father runs a skateboard shop.
- Patience (voiced by Vene L. Arcoraci) is the Chief's daughter. She has her mother's figure and her father's spoken accent.
- Mauricio (voiced by Phil Morris) is a Black comedian. He has at least twice been the target of villains seeking revenge on him.
- Tiffany Javelins / Songstress / Sally Smith (voiced by Lisa Loeb) is a teen pop music singer whom Brenda idolizes. Originally worked for the Mischievous Manager, but turned good after serving time causing the Mischievous Manager and Dr. Droid to hold her captive and make android duplicates of her. She was rescued by Teamo Supremo. Ironically, Toon Disney's official site for the show still labelled her as a villain. She is the spoof of real-world popstars such as Mandy Moore and others.
- B. Barry Berylium (voiced by Jack Larson) is the editor-in-chief of the state's newspaper, The Stately Planet. He prefers being addressed as "Chief" over "Sir".
- Ollie Jimson (voiced by Jason Marsden) is a rookie news journalist who works for Mr. Berylium, who finds it annoying that Ollie never calls him "Chief". His name is a nod to Jimmy Olsen.
- Viva Voom is Governor Kevin's Dutch exchange girlfriend from high school. She is now a famous actress, but still has her relationship with Kevin.
- A fellow member of the school faculty is usually the one to tell Mrs. Woolingantz that Governor Kevin needs the title team's help. Her name was never revealed in the series, nor did she ever actually have dialogue (she always whispers to the teacher).
- Newscaster (voiced by Jeff Bennett) is the state's unnamed newsman who always pops up on TV to deliver news. His name was never revealed.

==== Superheroes ====
There are other superheroes that help keep the state safe from crime:

- Mr. Gruff (voiced by Clancy Brown impersonating Mr. T) is an action hero who Teamo Supremo idolizes.
- The Silver Shield / Gordon (voiced by Robert Stack) is Crandall's grandfather who has had a Captain America-like superhero identity and fought crime during World War II. His battle cry is "Let freedom ring". His known rogues' gallery has included Purple Menace, Tommy Traitor, and Comrade Z.
- The Dark Talon / Nick (voiced by Gary Owens) is Crandall's other grandfather who has had a Batman-like superhero identity and fought crime during World War II.
- Captain Excellent (voiced by John O'Hurley) is an old superhero whom Crandall idolizes.
- AARSP is a superhero organization that stands for American Association for Retired Super Persons that is made up of elderly superheroes. Silver Shield and Dark Talon are associated with this group.
  - Ginormous Knight is a large knight-themed superhero and a member of AARSP.
  - Commander Tiny is the smallest superhero and a member of AARSP.
  - Mr. Sometimes (voiced by Maurice LaMarche) is a superhero and a member of AARSP who lives up to his name.
  - Not So Lazy Susan is a namesake superhero and a female member of AARSP who is an expert at hand-to-hand combat.

=== Villains ===
==== Recurring ====
- Baron Blitz (voiced by Maurice LaMarche) is a short, blue-skinned, German-accented man, possibly from an alien universe himself. He is known for taking control of wax figures and later on bronze statues and animatronics. Baron Blitz is from Blitzlevania.
- Technor the Mechanized Man (voiced by Jeff Bennett) is first invented by Paulson to be a robot psychologist, he became power-hungry. Technor often travels in his power-sucking Magna Body. The character is a spoof of Marvel Comics villain MODOK.
  - Techno-Creeps are the henchmen of Technor. Their outfits are similar to the A.I.M. Agents.
- Chopper Daddy (voiced by Jess Harnell) is a motorcycle-themed villain.
  - Scooter Lad, also known as Snake, also known as Justin, (voiced by Pamela Adlon), is Chopper Daddy's son who rides a scooter. He has tricked Teamo twice into believing they could trust him and his battle catchphrase is "Hoo-Ka!"
- Madame Snake (voiced by Sydney Walsh) is a femme fatale with snake-like features the ability to change her appearance, as well as an outrageously bad fashion sense.
  - Toy Boys are Madame Snake's henchmen.
- B.B. the Clown / The Birthday Bandit (voiced by Mark Hamill) is a birthday clown gone bad who often robs birthday parties and other special occasions. Due to love themes, he briefly changed his name to the Valentine Bandit when he kidnapped Viva Voom.
  - The Party Favors are similarly-dressed henchmen of Birthday Bandit. One Party Favor is named Evelyn.
- Lary / Laser Pirate (voiced by Tim Curry in most appearances, Jeff Bennett in "In the Beginning...") is a former colleague of Paulson. He is the only pirate that does not like water due to a college incident that ruined his invention. His hideout is a skyscraper that flies around (a possible homage to Monty Python's The Meaning of Life).
  - Mauve-Beard is one of Laser Pirate's henchmen.
  - Chartruese-Beard is one of Laser Pirate's henchmen.
  - Indigo-Beard is one of Laser Pirate's henchmen.
- Helius Inflato (voiced by Joel Murray) is a man who can inflate himself and fly, hence his name. He wants to build a casino in the state, but is not allowed to.
- Dehydro (voiced by Diedrich Bader) is a ex-cruise director/diving instructor who gave up his gig and became a water-themed villain and speaks with a London accent. Dehydro claims that humanity's true destiny lies beneath the waves. Dehydro often talks in a redundant manner and overemphasizes nearly everything he says.
  - Amphibious Army are the minions of Dehydro.
- Mr. Large (voiced by Edward Asner) is a crime boss who liked all of the large items.
  - Ernie the Hat (voiced by Maurice LaMarche) is one of Mr. Large's henchmen who wears a fedora.
  - Mickey the Shirt (voiced by Jeff Bennett) is one of Mr. Large's henchmen who wears a tropical shirt.
  - Rosie the Purse (voiced by Sydney Walsh) is one of Mr. Large's henchmen who is always carrying a purse.
- Mr. Vague (voiced by Gary Cole) is a rather dull villainous man with grey skin. He is not specific with what he wants to steal.
- Crawford / The Gauntlet (voiced by Wallace Shawn) is formerly one of Paulson's co-workers infatuated with power. He continually wreaks havoc with a pair of powerful Gauntlets he is always able to steal.
- Hypnotheria (voiced by April Winchell) is a hypnosis-themed villain who thinks of herself as regality and speaks of herself in the second person.
- Polly Pixel / Electronica (voiced by Kerri Kenney) is an ex-video game designer who was furious over the fact that players constantly beat her games using cheat codes.
- Dr. Droid (voiced by S. Scott Bullock) is an evil scientist who plans to replace all of the State's citizens with robot look-alikes (which also attempted to replace 'Droid himself with a robot version of him).
- Le Poodle (voiced by Jeff Bennett) is a disreputable cat burglar from France.
- The Mischievous Manager appeared as the manager of Songstress where she used her to control all the girls in the state with Songstress' songs. Teamo Supremo managed to defeat the Mischievous Manager who is then arrested by the Chief. She later collaborated with Dr. Droid in a plot that involves a robot version of Songstress.
- Big Skull (voiced by John Kassir) is an alien supervillain/real estate baron who was the mastermind behind the Cloaked Skull. His real name is pronounced by clicking one's teeth together three times. He once captured every adult superhero, except for Captain Excellent, who was attending an all-star golf tournament at the time.
  - Cloaked Skull (voiced by Joe Flaherty) is a masked villain who jinxed different places and was actually just irregular people controlled by Big Skull using alien technology in the masks.

==== One-shot ====
- Coco Caliente / Sinister Stylist (voiced by Sydney Walsh) is an ex-soap opera actress who had a bad hair day and ended up humiliated by TV comedian Maurico, due to the almost constant laughter of the audience attending this year's state awards show. She has since then sworn to give bad hair to several people and show it everywhere.
- Fabrica (voiced by Nicole Sullivan) is a stuffed toy maker who used them to commit crimes. She once brought to life all the stuffed toys in the state including the Teamo Supremo's stuffed toys.
- Dr. Pogo (voiced by John Kassir) is a mad scientist-like villain who travels everywhere on a pogo stick (as do his three henchmen).
- Cheapskate (voiced by John Kassir) is a skateboarding villain who tried to frame Skate Lad for all his crimes.
- The Put Down Artist (voiced by Barry Diamond) is a stand-up comedian who use his comedic talents to insult people and commit crimes. He appears to be a parody of the Batman villain Joker.
  - The Hecklers (voiced by Rob Paulsen) are three unnamed hecklers who serve as the henchmen of the Put Down Artist.
- Frenchy Stakes / The Tourist (voiced by Tress MacNeille) is a tour guide who became disgruntled when the tour party do not respect the monuments so she decided to steal them all.
  - The Dousens are the Tourorist's henchmen.
- Mirrorstar (voiced by Rob Paulsen) is a vain supervillain.
  - Vanity, Hubris, and Narcissism are Mirrorstar's henchmen.
- The Phony Dentist (voiced by Tim Curry) is an evil dentist who used a mind-control ray on his patients to try and take over the state.
  - Helga is the Phony Dentist's assistant.
- Car-Go is a criminal racer.
  - The Pit Crew are Car-Go's henchmen. They consist of Piston, Camshaft and the other guy.
- Lord Druid (voiced by Diedrich Bader) is a descendant of the family that once ruled the state and speaks with a Cheshire accent. He tried to change history so his family was still in control.
- Angler (voiced by Stephen Root) is a fisherman-themed villain. Billy Jim Dixon is a former host of the TV show "Fishin' with Billy Jim Dixon" until the show was cancelled and his fishing license revoked due to his henchmen being secretly behind his expert fishing skills that also involved hooking store-bought fish to his line. This led to him planning revenge on the state by using special lures called Smart Baits to hypnotize the state's fish to his fishing nets while plotting to corner the fishstick market.
  - The Fishmongers (voiced by Stephen Root and Eythann Scadron) are the henchmen of the Angler. Two of them are named Jeb and Zeke while the third one was unnamed and had no dialogue.
- Vladimir Trettiak (voiced by Joe Flaherty) is an old enemy from the Chief's younger years. He uses technology from Level 8 which happens to be a step up from Level 7.
- Sinister Shillelagh is a British villain with good luck who along with his henchmen love the color green. After stealing the banks' dollar money, he plots to rename St. Patrick's Day after him by stealing everything green-colored.
  - The Shenanigan Brothers are the henchmen of the Sinister Shillelagh. One of the brothers disagreed that stealing everything that is green-colored before St. Patrick's Day was a bad idea, knowing that it is the honest truth.
- Sloppy Joe (voiced by Stuart Pankin) is a grubby supervillain.
- Zomnambulist (voiced by Jonathan Freeman) is a dream-manipulating supervillain. He was once the States' leading dream researcher until he was denied a grant for some new dream research. This caused him to plan revenge on the State by tampering with the dreams of the children by using an Alpha Wave Dream Projector.
  - The Sleepwalkers (voiced by Jeff Bennett) the henchmen of Zomnambulist.
- Will 2 Wynn (voiced by David Leisure) is Governor Kevin's opponent in his re-election. His real name is William Aloysius Wynn, but when Governor Kevin beat him in the election for the high school's class president (which according to Kevin, was the only time Wynn lost at anything), Wynn changed his name to Will 2 Wynn. Will seemed certain to win the election due to his massive campaign fund, which came from a group known as "Will's Friends". After doing some investigating in the archives following a talk with B. Barry Berylium, the title team discovered that the "Will's Friends" group consisted of Baron Blitz, Madame Snake, Laser Pirate, Dehydro, Birthday Bandit, Electronica, Mr. Large, and Helius Inflato, which caused Will to reveal his true motive. Will planned to get back at Governor Kevin for beating him by helping every villain in the state get back at Teamo Supremo. However, Will was beaten and his criminal dealings were revealed, causing him to lose the election as it is illegal to accept campaign donations from criminals and state law prohibits the election of anyone in jail.
  - The Pollsters are Will 2 Wynn's henchmen.
- Mr. Alchemy (voiced by Xander Berkeley) is an alchemy-themed supervillain who wields an alchemy wand. He once stole Mr. Gruff's voice in order to ruin everyone's holiday season since he thought that Christmas was for people getting new things and not giving to other people. Teamo Supremo and Mr. Gruff set him straight and he did not finish the damages, restored Mr. Gruff's voice, and turned the ornaments on the Christmas tree to gold.
  - The Acolytes are the henchmen of Mr. Alchemy.
- The Sons of the Flange Brothers (voiced by Jeff Bennett and Phil Morris) are the self-explanatory sons of the acrobatic villains the Flange Brothers with some of them being cousins to each other. They can come together to form a whirlwind attack.
- DJ Despicable (voiced by Casey Kasem) is a supervillain who used to be a popular radio DJ who created a song for the title team called "Doin' the Supremo", but he unwittingly signed a record contract that did not allow him to collect all of lawsuits and money for his song being used on the radio. Enraged by this, he changed his name to DJ Despicable and he and his henchmen, The Mikes, used a special music to brainwash people into doing an unstoppable dance while he is on his crime spree. He was defeated by the Chief as the latter's Beat Deafness rendered him immune to DJ's hypnotic music.
- Barney the Bungler (voiced by Billy West) is a clumsy low-level villain who cannot keep a job or steal anything right.
- Comrade Z (voiced by Maurice LaMarche) is a villain with a "Z" ink over his left eye who is an old enemy of the Silver Shield. After being paroled from prison last week for good behavior, Comrade Z began his invasion of the State in order to get Silver Shield to surrender.
  - Comrade B (voiced by Sydney Walsh) is the henchwoman of Comrade Z with B-shaped barrettes in her hair who is an expert whip-wielder.
  - Comrade V (voiced by Corey Burton) is the henchman of Comrade Z who wears a V on his hat.
  - Comrade Y (voiced by Maurice LaMarche) is the henchman of Comrade Z.
  - The Z Soldiers are the foot soldiers of Comrade Z.
- General Incompetence (voiced by Craig Shoemaker) is an inept ex-militarist whose helmet shoots rays that makes people forget what they are doing.
  - Major Delays (voiced by Lorenzo Lamas) is an inept ex-militarist and General Incompetence's partner whose helmet shoots rays that makes people move very slowly.
  - The Stuper Troopers are the henchmen of General Incompetence.
- Libro Shushman is a librarian who turned to a life of crime.
- Dr. Minutia -
- Lo Fi (voiced by Michael McKean) is a famous musician who turned to a life of crime after the public rejected his experimental use of low-frequency music, which he now uses in his crimes. His real name is Daniel Patrick.
- Lavalizer is a minor villain with control of fire.
- Mean Thumb is a villain with very large thumbs.

== Episodes ==
Most of the episodes in the final two seasons did not air in production code order.

Season	Episodes		Segments	Originally released		
Season	Episodes		Segments	First released	Last released	Network
1	13		26	January 19, 2002	May 25, 2002	ABC
2	19 (Note: 37 segments total)	8	15	September 14, 2002	May 31, 2003	ABC
2	19	11	22	August 25, 2002	November 15, 2002	Toon Disney
3	7		13	December 5, 2003	August 17, 2004	Toon Disney

=== Season 1 (2002) ===
No. overall	No. in season	Title	Timing directed by	Written by	Storyboarded by	Original release date	Prod. code
1	1	"In the Beginning..."	Karen Peterson, Eddy Houchins & Gordon Kent	Phil Walsh	Rebecca Shen	January 19, 2002	101
1	1	"Duly Deputized Super Agents!"	Tim Walker	Phil Walsh	Sean Bishop	January 19, 2002	101
Crandall gets together a team of superheroes (Himself, Brenda, and Hector). When they audition for the governor, he does not believe kids can do it, but they prove themselves by defeating Baron Blitz and his team of wax president/zombies. When Governor Kevin accepts them, they become Captain Crandall, Rope Girl, and Skate Lad: TEAMO SUPREMO. Teamo Supremo has a hard time defeating Technor. When they meet Paulsen, a scientist, he gives them all-new-and-improved weapons, from "Level 7".
2	2	"And Then There Were Two..."	Gordon Kent	Story by : Phil Walsh; Teleplay by : Ford Riley	Dave Schwartz	January 26, 2002	102
2	2	"Who Invited the Birthday Bandit?"	Woody Yocum	Story by : Phil Walsh; Teleplay by : Barry Friedman & Phil Walsh	Gavin Dell	January 26, 2002	102
Skate Lad becomes jealous when a new kid called Scooter Lad impresses Captain Crandall and Rope Girl, but things soon takes a serious turn when he learns that Scooter Lad is actually the son of Chopper Daddy, the leader of a vicious motorcycle gang. Teamo Supremo must stop an evil clown called the Birthday Bandit from ruining parties.
3	3	"My Sister the Spy!"	Woody Yocum	Story by : Phil Walsh; Teleplay by : Ford Riley & Scott Sooneborn	Troy Adomitis	February 2, 2002	103
3	3	"Sinister Substitute!"	Gordon Kent	Story by : Phil Walsh; Teleplay by : Ford Riley	Dave Filoni	February 2, 2002	103
Crandall's sister Jean got a locket as a present from a French boy. Meanwhile, Teamo Supremo keeps trying to defeat a group of French thugs led by Le Poodle but the thugs are always one step ahead of them. Captain Crandall finds out that the locket Jean has is a walkie-talkie for the thugs which lets them know what Teamo Supremo is planning. An evil fashion stylist named Madame Snake disguises herself as Teamo Supremo's teacher and gives them lots of homework so they will have no time to fight crime.
4	4	"Grounded!"	Tim Walker	Story by : Phil Walsh; Teleplay by : Henry Gilroy	Chuck Klein	February 9, 2002	104
4	4	"The Baron and the Baby Brother!"	Kevin Petrilak	Story by : Phil Walsh; Teleplay by : Barry Friedman & Phil Walsh	David Schwartz	February 9, 2002	104
Teamo is grounded much to the dismay of Governor Kevin, which lures the latest villain, Mr. Large in town to Crandall's house where they ambush him. Baron Blitz returns but Skate Lad and Crandall must fight him alone as Rope Girl is taking care of her brother.
5	5	"The Chief's New Groove"	Woody Yocum	Story by : Phil Walsh; Teleplay by : Jack Monaco	Rebecca Shen	February 16, 2002	105
5	5	"Capitol Offense!"	Gordon Kent	Story by : Phil Walsh; Teleplay by : Henry Gilroy	Sean Bishop	February 16, 2002	105
Tired of Teamo Supremo always being the heroes and feeling useless, the Chief goes out to become a superhero himself, but he causes more problems than he solves, and things quickly get worse when Lo-Fi shows up and attempts to ruin the festival. While the class learns about pirates, a real pirate called Laser Pirate begins to raid Level 7.
6	6	"Danger: Dirigibles!"	Kevin Petrilak	Story by : Phil Walsh; Teleplay by : Kevin Campbell & Ford Riley	Dave Schwartz	February 22, 2002	106
6	6	"Enter the Cheapskate!"	Tim Walker	Story by : Phil Walsh; Teleplay by : Sara Sluke & Hilary Cherniss	Mike Diederich	February 22, 2002	106
After Governor Kevin convinces the state legislature to veto a bill that would have allowed for a casino to be built, Helius Inflato swears revenge and sends hordes of mechanical blimps to block out the sun, and he refuses to move them until the state government changes their mind. As always, it is Teamo to the rescue. Skate Lad is accused of stealing people's possessions, causing Governor Kevin to suspend him until further notice. It is soon discovered by Skate Lad that a similar villain named Cheapskate and his henchmen are responsible.
7	7	"Appetite For... Dessert!"	Gordon Kent	Story by : Phil Walsh; Teleplay by : Libby Bideau	Gavin Dell	February 23, 2002	107
7	7	"It's Crandall's Birthday – Bandit!"	Woody Yocum	Story by : Ford Riley; Teleplay by : Jack Monaco	Dave Filoni	February 23, 2002	107
When Hypnotheria, with the ability to hypnotize people, hypnotizes them, Teamo Supremo begins eating junk food instead of their normal healthy regime. Crandall's new toolbelt was stolen by the Birthday Bandit, and now he is using the gadgets against Teamo Supremo.
8	8	"The Sinister Stylist!"	Jang Kim	Story by : Phil Walsh; Teleplay by : Krista Tucker	Rebecca Shen	March 2, 2002	108
8	8	"Running the Gauntlet!"	Kevin Petrilak & Gordon Kent	Story by : Phil Walsh; Teleplay by : Henry Gilroy	Chong Lee	March 2, 2002	108
A former soap actress turns to crime. Paulson's assistant Mr. Crawford steals some very powerful gloves.
9	9	"Attack of the Stuffed Stuff!"	Woody Yocum	Story by : Phil Walsh; Teleplay by : Eric Friedman and Ford Riley	Dave Schwartz	April 13, 2002	109
9	9	"Reservoir Frogs!"	Kevin Petrilak	Story by : Phil Walsh; Teleplay by : Kent Redeker	Mike Diederich & Dave Filoni	April 13, 2002	109
Fabrica uses stuffed animals to steal all the kids' stuffed animals in order to bring them to life and start a stuffed animal army. Teamo Supremo must stop Dehydro and his henchmen from flooding the city.
10	10	"Sounds of the Songstress!"	John Kimball	Story by : Phil Walsh; Teleplay by : Krista Tucker	Chong Lee	May 4, 2002	110
10	10	"Calling Captain Excellent!"	Gordon Kent	Story by : Phil Walsh; Teleplay by : Carrie Evans	Mike Kazaleh	May 4, 2002	110
A new teen idol is in town, and her name is Tiffany Javelins (AKA Sally Smith). With her influence, fashion sense, and style, she singlehandedly gets every girl in the state, including Rope Girl, at her command. Everything Tiffany does is "Tifftastic" according to her followers. Captain Crandall and Skate Lad see through the charade and put an end to the fandom mob mentality and defeat her controller the Mischievous Manager. Governor Kevin states that, in order to gain rights to be called a real superhero, a superhero has to be evaluated by a real superhero sent by the Planetary Superhero Council. The team's favorite superhero Captain Excellent has been sent to evaluate them, but the arrival of Baron Blitz interferes, and Teamo Supremo has a chance to prove their worth.
11	11	"Pogo Panic!"	Tim Walker	Story by : Phil Walsh; Teleplay by : Laura McCreary & Mark Myers	Dave Filoni	May 11, 2002	111
11	11	"Enter Dr. 'Droid!"	Gordon Kent	Story by : Phil Walsh; Teleplay by : Henry Gilroy	Gavin Dell	May 11, 2002	111
Teamo faces off against Dr. Pogo, who commits his crimes using pogo sticks to gain revenge for the world's lack of spring appreciation. Teamo combats the robot-loving Dr. Droid, who aims to make the world "a nicer place" by replacing everyone with robots.
12	12	"Mr. Vague Does Something..."	Gordon Kent	Story by : Phil Walsh; Teleplay by : Jack Monaco	Rebecca Shen	May 18, 2002	112
12	12	"The Big Put-Down!"	Woody Yocum	Story by : Phil Walsh; Teleplay by : Krista Tucker	Gavin Dell	May 18, 2002	112
Odd robberies start happening and no one, not even Teamo can figure out the method behind them or if there even is one. A new villain called the Put-Down Artist comes and badly insults everyone making them feel low.
13	13	"The Return of Technor!"	Woody Yocum	Story by : Jack Monaco; Teleplay by : Phil Walsh & Ford Riley	Dave Filoni	May 25, 2002	113
13	13	"A Monumental Crisis!"	Mitch Rochon	Story by : Brian Sintay; Teleplay by : Ford Riley	Gavin Dell	May 25, 2002	113
The Techno-Creeps have escaped from jail and have plotted to revive their leader Technor by finding and empowering the Magnabody. The Magnabody, once fully charged, has the ability to find Technor on its own. Once the Magna has enough energy and finds Technor back in Level 7, Technor is now off to fully charge himself, which will cut off the entire state's power supply, which is to the dismay of Skate Lad because he is afraid of the dark. Can Teamo Supremo must stop Technor in time before the entire state blacks out. After a long field trip around the state for its monuments, the children of Teamo Supremo's class find it uninteresting. The tour guide, Frenchy Stakas, who's obsessed with and dedicated to the history of the monuments, threatens that she will make the people take the monuments and their history seriously – especially the children. Assuming the identity of the Tourorist, she and her Docents steal all of the monuments from the state to a place where she can really appreciate them. Teamo Supremo must find the monuments and return them to their rightful places, and capture the Tourorist and her Docents.

=== Season 2 (2002–03) ===
The second season consisted of nineteen episodes, which makes the longest season to air. Eight episodes were aired on ABC. Eleven episodes were aired on Toon Disney.

No. overall	No. in season	Title	Timing directed by	Written by	Storyboard by	Original release date	Prod. code
27	1	"Thog the Caveman Returns!"	Barbara Dourmashkin-Case	Rico Gagliano and Jason Berlin; Story by : Phil Walsh	Rebecca Shen	August 25, 2002^{b}	205a
An actor who once portrayed Thog, the caveman mascot for the discontinued Breakfast Clubs Cereal, suffers a bump on the head. Afterwards, he thinks he really is Thog the Caveman.
28	2	"Mr. Large's Slippery Scheme"	Woody Yocum	Nick Garey; Story by : Ford Riley	Dave Filoni	August 25, 2002^{b}	205b
When he starts acting weird, Teamo discovers that Governor Kevin was kidnapped and that Madame Snake is impersonating him and partnered up with Mr. Large.
29	3	"The Big Image Problem!"	Woody Yocum	Krista Tucker; Story by : Phil Walsh	Gavin Dell	September 14, 2002^{a}	209a
Teamo faces off against Mirrorstar – a very vain villain who attempts to melt down all the state's mirrors into a single gigantic one with which to admire himself.
30	4	"Not on My Cinco De Mayo!"	Mitch Rochon	Ford Riley	Rebecca Shen	September 14, 2002^{a}	209b
It is Cinco De Mayo and everyone is celebrating – except for Le Poodle, who is angry because this day marks France's wartime defeat. Le Poodle has set out to steal all the Mexican stuff that he can find.
31	5	"You Better Start Calling Me Chief!"	John Kimball and Mitch Rochon	Rico Gagliano and Jason Berlin; Story by : Phil Walsh	Rebecca Shen	September 6, 2002^{b}	201a
Teamo Supremo is being interviewed for the state newspaper by a cub reporter named Ollie Jimson. Meanwhile, his boss keeps fuming over those who don't address him as "Chief" instead of "sir". Things take a really bad turn when the Trapster arrives.
32	6	"When Elements Unite!"	Gordon Kent	Kent Redeker; Story by : Phil Walsh and Ford Riley	Gavin Dell	September 6, 2002^{b}	201b
Laser Pirate, Helius Inflato, and Dehydro have united as the Elements of Unpleasantness.
33	7	"The Haunted House on Horror Hill!"	Gordon Kent and Kevin Petrilak	Ford Riley; Story by : Phil Walsh	Dave Filoni	October 25, 2002^{b}	202a
Teamo Supremo visit a haunted house on Halloween where the Cloaked Skull is lurking.
34	8	"An Appointment With the Dentist!"	Jang Kim	Thom Hart; Story by : Phil Walsh	Gavin Dell	October 25, 2002^{b}	202b
An evil dentist starts controlling people's minds.
35	9	"Getaway Car-Go!"	Woody Yocum	Mark Archuleta; Story by : Ford Riley	Chong Lee	September 27, 2002^{b}	203a
After losing his pink slips, a racer wreaks havoc in the state by stealing various muscle and sports cars. That racer is Car-Go along with his pit crew. Stealing all of the best cars they can find focuses on the fastest production car ever built: the Penketh QRS. It is about to be displayed at a car show the state is holding. Teamo Supremo must stop Car-Go and his pit crew from stealing the Penketh QRS and apprehend this rogue racer.
36	10	"Enter Lord Druid!"	Mitch Rochon	Jack Monaco; Story by : Ford Riley	Gavin Dell	September 27, 2002^{b}	203b
The entire state is currently encountering a massive Deja Vu and is seem to be repeating themselves thanks to Lord Druid.
37	11	"Electronica's Game!"	Jungja Kim-Wolf and Woody Yocum	Libby Bideau; Story by : Libby Bideau and Ford Riley	Dave Filoni	October 4, 2002^{b}	204a
Electronica tries to ruin all video games when people start beating her games by using cheat codes.
38	12	"The Angler's Angle!"	Jang Kim	Clay Wilcox; Story by : Phil Walsh	Mike Kim	October 4, 2002^{b}	204b
The Angler is stealing all the fish in the world.
39	13	"Out of the Past"	John Kimball	Milton Chassman; Story by : Phil Walsh	Rebecca Shen	October 11, 2002^{b}	206a
The Chief faces off against an old nemesis from his younger days: Vladimir Trettiak, who has come equipped with technology from Level 8 that surpasses that of the team.
40	14	"The Sinister Shillelagh!"	Gordon Kent	John Boni; Story by : Ford Riley	Scott Shaw	October 11, 2002^{b}	206b
Teamo faces a villain with uncanny good luck for him and bad luck for them.
41	15	"The Parents From Another Planet!"	Mitch Rochon	Ford Riley (also story)	Gavin Dell	October 18, 2002^{b}	207a
Pretending to be Crandall's real parents, two people named Lisa and Robert try to steal the state's many things.
42	16	"The Birthday Bash!"	Woody Yocum	Jack Monaco; Story by : Ford Riley	Troy Adomitis	October 18, 2002^{b}	207b
The Birthday Bandit returns, and he invites Teamo, Governor Kevin, The Chief, Paulson, and Samantha to a party.
43	17	"The Sinister Sloppy Joe!"	John Kimball	Jim Peronto; Story by : Phil Walsh	Chong Lee	September 20, 2002^{b}	208a
Teamo combats the messy and mean Sloppy Joe, who schemes to turn the state into his disorderly domain.
44	18	"Surf, Sand, Sun and... Skull?"	Gordon Kent	Brian Sintay; Story by : Ford Riley	Dave Filoni	September 20, 2002^{b}	208b
The Cloaked Skull returns on the state beach and has somehow cursed Teamo's tools.
45	19	"Things That Go Bump in the Night!"	Gordon Kent	Jack Monaco; Story by : Phil Walsh	Kevin Altieri	November 1, 2002^{b}	210a
Teamo battles the Zomnambulist, a villain who stalks sleepers in their dreams.
46	20	"The Will of the People!"	John Kimball	Barry Friedman and Ford Riley; Story by : Phil Walsh and Ford Riley	Troy Adomitis	November 1, 2002^{b}	210b
A man named Will 2 Wynn is running against Governor Kevin for governor; if Will wins, everyone loses. Teamo Supremo does not know it yet, but Will 2 Wynn has gained the support of villains like Baron Blitz, Madame Snake, Laser Pirate, Dehydro, Birthday Bandit, Electronica, Mr. Large, and Helius Inflato.
47	21	"Happy Holidays Mr. Gruff"	Tim Walker	Phil Walsh and Ford Riley; Story by : Phil Walsh	Dave Schwartz and Dave Filoni	December 7, 2002^{a}	211a
During the holiday season, Teamo's favorite action hero Mr. Gruff helps them combat the evil Mr. Alchemy who thinks that people are more into getting new things on Christmas.
48	22	"The Grandfather Show"	Kevin Petrilak	Ford Riley; Story by : Phil Walsh and Ford Riley	Dave Filoni	December 7, 2002^{a}	211b
Crandall's grandpa, superheroes called Silver Shield and Dark Talon, help Teamo combat a bunch of second generation villains called the Sons of the Flange who are planning to disrupt the New Year's Eve plans.
49	23	"Going It Alone!"	Gordon Kent	Jack Monaco; Story by : Phil Walsh	David Filoni	March 1, 2003^{a}	214a
Madame Snake tricks Crandall into thinking he'd be better off without Skate Land and Rope Girl, which is seemingly confirmed when the latter two are injured fighting her.
50	24	"Out to Dry!"	John Kimball	Kent Redeker; Story by : Phil Walsh and Ford Riley	Rebecca Shen	March 1, 2003^{a}	214b
Dehydro escapes from prison and begins stealing all the water in the state.
51	25	"Play It Again Songstress!"	Mitch Rochon and Trell Yocum	Story by : Phil Walsh & Ford Riley; Written by : Krista Tucker	Carlos Baeza and Chong Lee	March 8, 2003^{a}	215
Teamo Supremo is informed by the governor that Tiffany Javelins is planning a comeback tour. After Captain Crandall and Skate Lad get trapped, Rope Girl is invited by Tiffany to go on tour with her. What Rope Girl does not know yet is that the Manager and Dr. Droid return and trick Rope Girl into singing with a robotic Tiffany while having the real Tiffany as their prisoner. Note: This is the first half-hour special.
52	26	"Welcome to the Magna Mall!"	Mitch Rochon	Francis Gagliano; Story by : Phil Walsh and Ford Riley	David Filoni	April 12, 2003^{a}	217a
Hector thinks the state's new mall is actually Technor's Magnabody.
53	27	"The Baron's Blitz!"	Trell Yocum	Kent Redeker; Story by : Phil Walsh	Rebecca Shen	April 12, 2003^{a}	217b
Baron Blitz returns and his henchmen are now unmeltable metal football players.
54	28	"Pyrite and Pirate!"	Gordon Kent	Brian Sintay and Nicholas Garey; Story by : Phil Walsh and Ford Riley	Scott Shaw	April 19, 2003^{a}	218a
Laser Pirate offers Sam a new job.
55	29	"The Chief of Cheer!"	John Kimball	Libby Bideau; Story by : Phil Walsh and Ford Riley	Chong Lee	April 19, 2003^{a}	218b
Hypnotheria returns to hypnotize the Chief.
56	30	"Cloaked Paulson, Mr. Skull"	Jang Kim	Ford Riley; Story by : Phil Walsh and Ford Riley	Shellie Kvilvang	April 26, 2003^{a}	219a
The Cloaked Skull is back, and menacing the state capital, but this time the skull is, apparently, Mr. Paulson.
57	31	"3, 2, 1... Teamo!"	John Kimball and Gordon Kent	Mark Drop; Story by : Phil Walsh and Ford Riley	Gary Terry	April 26, 2003^{a}	219b
A threat by an intergalactic villain called the Big Skull has Teamo and Captain Excellent uniting to save the world from Big Skull and his army of Cloaked Skulls. This episode continues from where the last one left off.
58	32	"Brenda's Birthday Bandit!"	Gordon Kent	Gordon Kent; Story by : Phil Walsh	Shellie Kvilvang	May 31, 2003^{a}	216a
Brenda/Rope Girl celebrates her birthday at Girlie World where the Birthday Bandit's helper is waiting for the arrival of the Birthday Bandit who has plans for Rope Girl.
59	33	"Raising The State!"	John Kimball	Jack Monaco; Story by : Phil Walsh and Ford Riley	Ben Jones, Gabe Swarr, and Gary Terry	May 31, 2003^{a}	216b
Helius Inflato gets ownership of the sky and he raises the state up there so he can be governor.
60	34	"Electronica's Game 2!"	John Kimball	Kent Redeker; Story by : Ford Riley	Dave Filoni	November 8, 2002^{b}	212a
Paulson has just met up with a new pen pal. Paulson is spending more time contacting her and less time improving Teamo's tools. Jean figures out the pen pal is really Electronica, who has broken out of prison and now seeks to challenge the Teamo with a whole new game of revenge.
61	35	"Tossing the Gauntlet!"	Mitch Rochon	Jim Peronto; Story by : Phil Walsh	Chong Lee	November 8, 2002^{b}	212b
The Gauntlet tricks his way out of prison and steals the gauntlets once again. Paulson and Teamo easily stop him by tricking him into pulling off the gauntlets.
62	36	"Doin' the Supremo!"	Woody Yocum	Ford Riley; Story by : Phil Walsh	Gavin Dell	November 15, 2002^{b}	213a
DJ Despicable is hypnotizing people with his music during his crime spree.
63	37	"Beware of the Bungler!"	Gordon Kent	Mike Kramer; Story by : Phil Walsh and Ford Riley	Troy Adomitis	November 15, 2002^{b}	213b
Teamo Supremo is forced to stop Barney the Bungler from causing disaster when he tries to rob places like banks, pet shops, and other places.

- ^a Aired on ABC.
- ^b Aired on Toon Disney.

=== Season 3 (2003–04) ===
The third and final season consisted of thirteen episodes, which makes it the shortest season to air, and aired on Toon Disney.

No. overall	No. in season	Title	Timing directed by	Written by	Storyboard by	Original release date	Prod. code
64	1	"Something Cheesy This Way Comes!"	Mitch Rochon	Krista Tucker; Story by : Phil Walsh	David Filoni and Deborah Cone	December 5, 2003	301a
State scientists find out that the homemade cheese of a cheese cook named Elizabeth Cheddar was artificially aged. All of her products are then taken off the market and her TV show is sold. Elizabeth Cheddar is so angry that she decides to take revenge on her critics.
65	2	"Cartoons of Doom!"	Trell Yocum	Julie Marsh	Rebecca Shen	December 5, 2003	301b
A talented cartoonist has come up with a new cartoon series, but has been rejected by the large drawing studios in the state.
66	3	"State of Chaos"	Gordon Kent	Jack Monaco; Story by : Phil Walsh	Michael Kazaleh and Deborah Cone	December 12, 2003	302a
General Incompetence and Major Delays, two inept ex-militarists, unleash a ray which makes everybody who is hit by it incompetent and late.
67	4	"Science Friction!"	John Kimball	Jim Peronto; Story by : Phil Walsh & Ford Riley	Chong Lee	December 12, 2003	302b
Crandall loses his temper when the animatronic aliens at the Out of This World Cafe and Amusement Park seemingly rebel against humanity, which is actually the work of Baron Blitz.
68	5	"The Mark of Comrade Z"	John Kimball and Gordon Kent	Gordon Kent; Story by : Phil Walsh and Ford Riley	David Filoni and Gary Terry	December 19, 2003	304
The entire state is under attack by a villain named Comrade Z who was paroled from prison last week due to good behaviour. During his invasion involving an iron shower curtain around the state and a forcefield, he demands only one thing – the surrender of his arch nemesis the Silver Shield. As Comrade Z's attacks intensifies, Teamo Supremo, Silver Shield, and Dark Talon must work together to defeat Comrade Z and his forces that also involves training Teamo Supremo at AARSP (short for American Association of Retired Super Persons). NOTE: This is the second and final half-hour special.
69	6	"Teamo Rocks!"	Mitch Rochon	Clay Wilcox; Story by : Phil Walsh	Chong Lee	December 26, 2003	305a
Two former songwriters have been stealing the musical talents of various performers, and with assistance from Tiffany Javelyns, Teamo goes undercover as a rock band to stop them.
70	7	"The Wrath of Scooter Lad!"	Woody Yocum	Nick Garey; Story by : Phil Walsh & Ford Riley	Scott Shaw	December 26, 2003	305b
Skate Lad competes in the Y-Not games, and meets up with a "supposedly" reformed Scooter Lad.
71	8	"Will You Be My Valentine Bandit?"	Woody Yocum	Eric Garcia; Story by : Phil Walsh	Rebecca Shen & Gary Terry	March 14, 2004	303a
The Birthday Bandit (now called the Valentine Bandit) kidnaps Governor Kevin's girlfriend, movie starlet Viva Voom. NOTE: The episode, along with the below one ("Uncontrollable Goopy Substance!"), were aired only once on Toon Disney at 6:00 AM (hence why no copies were available online until October 2026).
72	9	"Uncontrollable Goopy Substance!"	Mitch Rochon	Ford Riley; Story by : Phil Walsh	Shellie Kvilvang	March 14, 2004	303b
Mr. Vague unleashes a monstrous green goopy substance on the state.
73	10	"Word Search"	Gordon Kent	Krista Tucker; Story by : Phil Walsh	Shellie Kvilvang	August 16, 2004	306a
Teamo Supremo faces off against loony librarian Libro Shushman, who is tired of people paying no attention to late book notices, and is stealing all the words in the state with her "Dictionary of Doom".
74	11	"Micro Supremo"	John Kimball	Julie Marsh; Story by : Ford Riley	Rebecca Shen	August 16, 2004	306b
Teamo Supremo accidentally get shrunken down size while facing of against Captain Excellent's arch foe Dr. Minutia, and must now get to Level 7 to reverse it and capture the bad guys, while standing only five inches tall.
75	12	"The Governor's Analyst"	Mitch Rochon	Phil Walsh; Story by : Mark Drop	Gary Terry	August 17, 2004	307a
Helius Inflato kidnaps Governor Kevin's new color analyst, Dr. Cedric Flint.
76	13	"The Gauntlet's New Gloves!"	Woody Yocum	Phil Walsh; Story by : Ford Riley	Dave Filoni	August 17, 2004	307b
In the series finale, the Gauntlet, now in an activated super-powered suit, abducts Paulson and Samantha, then Governor Kevin and the Chief, in hopes of leading Teamo into a dangerous trap.
