= Matchstick Men =

2003 film by Ridley Scott

- Theatrical release poster
- Directed by: Ridley Scott
- Screenplay by: Ted Griffin; Nicholas Griffin
- Based on: Matchstick Men by Eric Garcia
- Produced by: Ridley Scott; Steve Starkey; Sean Bailey; Jack Rapke; Ted Griffin
- Starring: Nicolas Cage; Sam Rockwell; Alison Lohman; Bruce McGill
- Cinematography: John Mathieson
- Edited by: Dody Dorn
- Music by: Hans Zimmer
- Production companies: ImageMovers; Scott Free Productions; Rickshaw Productions; LivePlanet
- Distributed by: Warner Bros. Pictures
- Release dates: September 2, 2003 (Venice Film Festival); September 12, 2003 (United States)
- Running time: 116 minutes
- Countries: United States; United Kingdom
- Language: English
- Budget: $62 million
- Box office: $65.6 million

Matchstick Men is a 2003 American black comedy crime film directed by Ridley Scott and based on Eric Garcia's 2002 novel of the same name. The film stars Nicolas Cage, Sam Rockwell, and Alison Lohman. The film premiered on September 2, 2003, at the 60th Venice International Film Festival and was released by Warner Bros. Pictures in the United States on September 12. It received generally positive reviews and grossed $65.6 million against its $62 million budget.

== Plot ==
Roy Waller is a con artist from Los Angeles with severe Tourette syndrome and obsessive–compulsive disorder (OCD). Alongside his partner and protégé Frank Mercer, Roy runs short cons, selling overpriced water filtration systems to unsuspecting customers. One day, Roy accidentally spills his medication down the sink; he then discovers that his doctor has skipped town and begins a cleaning spree in his house that lasts until the following day. Roy subsequently experiences a violent panic attack when Frank visits him. Frank suggests that he see a psychiatrist, Dr. Harris Klein.

Klein provides Roy with medication. In therapy, Roy recalls his past relationship with Heather, his ex-wife who was pregnant during their divorce. At Roy's behest, Klein informs Roy that he called Heather, finding out Roy has a 14-year-old daughter, Angela. Roy and Angela meet. Jubilant, he later agrees to work with Frank on a long con; their target is businessman Chuck Frechette, whom they plan to con using the pigeon drop.

One night, Angela shows up at Roy's house, saying that she has had a fight with Heather, deciding to stay for the weekend before returning to school. Angela returns home late one night, leading to an argument between them. During dinner, Roy admits that he is a con artist and reluctantly agrees to teach Angela a con. They go to a laundromat and con an older woman into believing that she has won the lottery, so she shares half of her expected winnings with Angela; however, Roy then forces Angela to return the money.

Roy goes bowling with Angela but is interrupted when Frank reveals that Chuck's flight to the Caymans has been updated to that day instead of Friday as planned. With little time, Roy reluctantly lets Angela distract Chuck midway through the con; however, after the con is finished, Chuck realizes what happened and chases them into a parking garage before they escape. Roy then discovers that Angela was arrested a year earlier and asks her to stop calling him.

Without Angela, Roy's myriad phobias resurface, and during another panic attack, he learns that the medication given to him by Klein is a placebo. To Frank's disappointment, Roy proclaims that he needs Angela but would have to change his lifestyle. Roy reaches out to Angela, and they reconcile. After returning from dinner one night, they find Chuck waiting for them with a gun alongside a badly beaten Frank. Angela shoots Chuck, and Roy sends her off with Frank into hiding until the matter can be resolved. As Roy prepares to take care of Chuck's body, Chuck springs to life and knocks Roy unconscious.

Roy awakens in a hospital, where the police reveal that Chuck died from the gunshot and Frank and Angela have disappeared. Klein appears, and Roy gives him the password to his large safety deposit box, ordering him to provide the money to Angela when she is found. Later, Roy awakens to find that the "police" have disappeared, his "hospital room" is a freight container on the roof of a parking garage, "Dr. Klein's" office is vacant, and Roy's substantial cash savings have been taken. Frank reveals in a letter that he pulled a long con. Roy drives over to Heather's (whom he has not seen in years), looking for Angela. Roy learns the truth: Heather miscarried their child. The young woman he thought was their child was Frank's accomplice.

One year later, Roy is a salesman at a carpet store, where one day Angela and her boyfriend wander in. Roy confronts Angela, but ultimately forgives her, realizing that he is happier as an honest man. Angela reveals that she did not receive her fair share of the cut from Frank and that it was the only con she ever pulled. She then asks Roy if he would like to know her real name, to which he replies "I know your name." In turn, Angela says "I'll see you, Dad." before departing with her boyfriend. Roy returns home to his new wife, Kathy, who is pregnant with his child.

== Cast ==
- Nicolas Cage as Roy Waller
- Sam Rockwell as Frank Mercer
- Alison Lohman as Angela
- Bruce Altman as Dr. Harris Klein
- Bruce McGill as Chuck Frechette
- Sheila Kelley as Kathy
- Beth Grant as Laundry Lady
- Melora Walters as Heather, Roy's Former Wife (uncredited)
- Jenny O'Hara as Mrs. Schaffer
- Steve Eastin as Mr. Schaffer
- Fran Kranz as Slacker Boyfriend
- Tim Kelleher as Bishop
- Tim Maculan as Pharmacist #2
- Giannina Facio as Bank Teller
- Sonya Eddy as Parking Garage Cashier
- Jim Zulevic as Bartender

== Release ==
=== Box office ===
Opening in 2,711 theaters in the United States and Canada, the film's opening weekend gross stood at second place with $13.0 million for a per-theater-average of $4,827; it ultimately lost the number-one position to Once Upon a Time in Mexico. The film eventually grossed $36.9 million domestically, and $65.5 million worldwide.

=== Critical reception ===
On the review aggregator website Rotten Tomatoes, 83% of 183 critics' reviews are positive, with an average rating of 7.1/10. The website's consensus reads: "Breezy and well-acted, Matchstick Men focuses more on the characters than on the con." Metacritic, which uses a weighted average, assigned the film a score of 61 out of 100, based on 38 critics, indicating "generally favorable" reviews. Audiences polled by CinemaScore gave the film an average grade of "B" on an A+ to F scale.

Roger Ebert gave the film 4 stars out of 4, describing it as "so absorbing that whenever it cuts away from the plot, there is another, better plot to cut to." He also recommended the film for several Oscar nominations, most notably Nicolas Cage's performance and the film's screenplay. James Berardinelli awarded the film 3½ stars out of 4, praising the film for its "sly, biting sense of humor" and "emotionally satisfying" elements. He also praised the film's acting, and ultimately noted that the film was "worth every cent" of the ticket price and was "the first winner of the fall movie season." Carrie Rickey of The Philadelphia Inquirer praised Lohman's "naturalistic acting" and "unaffected air". She also liked Scott's "mannerist direction", yet had mixed feelings about the film's final "O. Henry surprise", calling it "a twist deserving of Chubby Checker." Stephen Hunter of The Washington Post wrote the film was best enjoyed when "you don't fight it and try not to put too much thought into certain anomalies that crop up along the way. Let it swindle you; it's part of the fun."
