= Brendan Francis Newnam =

Brendan Francis Newnam is a writer and radio host best known as the co-host of The Dinner Party Download with Rico Gagliano, produced by American Public Media.

== Radio career ==
A native of Philadelphia, Pennsylvania, Brendan studied to be a lawyer at Temple University, where he was a Knight Media Fellow. He got his start in radio as a producer for a local arts program at WRTI, and as a staff researcher for Fresh Air with Terry Gross. Later he became a regular contributor to Marketplace and Weekend America. He co-created and co-hosted the radio show and podcast The Dinner Party Download. The podcast was consistently ranked among the top 100 iTunes Podcast downloads. The show was structured in several acts, mimicking the segments of a dinner party.

In addition to his radio work, Brendan writes a travel column for CNN.

He has been named one of Food & Wine magazine's "Big Thinkers Under 40". He has been a judge on Top Chef Masters Season 3 and a guest on Rocco's Dinner Party.
