= Repo Men =

2010 film by Miguel Sapochnik

- Theatrical release poster
- Directed by: Miguel Sapochnik
- Written by: Eric Garcia; Garrett Lerner
- Based on: The Repossession Mambo by Eric Garcia
- Produced by: Scott Stuber
- Starring: Jude Law; Forest Whitaker; Liev Schreiber; Alice Braga; Carice van Houten
- Cinematography: Enrique Chediak
- Edited by: Richard Francis-Bruce
- Music by: Marco Beltrami
- Production companies: Relativity Media; Stuber Pictures
- Distributed by: Universal Pictures
- Release date: March 19, 2010
- Running time: 111 minutes 119 minutes (Unrated)
- Countries: United States; Canada
- Languages: English; Spanish
- Budget: $32 million
- Box office: $18.4 million

Repo Men is a 2010 science fiction action film directed by Miguel Sapochnik, starring Jude Law, Forest Whitaker, Liev Schreiber, Alice Braga, and Carice van Houten. An American-Canadian production, it is based on the novel The Repossession Mambo by Eric Garcia and follows a repo man who goes on the run after he becomes the recipient of an artificial heart and finds himself suffering the same fate as his victims. The film was theatrically released by Universal Pictures on March 19, 2010 to negative reviews from critics while grossing $18.4 million against a $32 million budget, making it a box office bomb.

== Plot ==
By 2025, advancements in medical technology have perfected bio-mechanical organs. The Union corporation sells these expensive "artiforgs" on credit, and when customers fail to pay on time, the company sends "repo men" to forcibly repossess the organ—in which the customer is tased and offered the request of an ambulance, sometimes resulting in the customer's death.

Remy and his lifelong friend Jake are the Union's best repo men, but Remy's wife Carol believes his work is a bad influence on their son, Peter. When Remy allows Jake to perform a repossession outside their family barbecue, an angry Carol leaves with Peter. Raiding a "nest" of Union debtors fleeing the country, Remy and Jake impress their boss, Frank, but Remy's mind is made up to transfer to the sales department. Jake arranges one last job—repossessing the heart from a musician Remy admires—but a malfunctioning defibrillator injures Remy, requiring the replacement of his own heart with an artiforg.

Carol divorces Remy and he moves in with Jake, but his newfound sympathy for customers leaves him unable to lie as a salesman and unable to dissect deadbeat customers as a repo man. With Remy behind on his heart payments, Jake takes him to another nest with enough artiforgs to clear his debt, but Remy cannot do the job. Jake leaves, and a debtor knocks Remy unconscious. Waking up, Remy rescues Beth, a lounge singer he recognizes, who is suffering from drug use and her numerous unpaid artiforgs.

Breaking into the Union office, Remy attempts to clear his and Beth's accounts but is interrupted by Jake, who lets him leave. On the run, Beth and Remy lay low in the city's abandoned outskirts, and Beth reveals that she was forced to buy black market artiforgs after running up severe debts. They begin a relationship, and Remy decides to document his life as a repo man with an old typewriter.

Tracked down by Ray, a rival repo man, Remy lures him into falling through a hole in the floor. Beth falls as well, damaging her prosthetic knee, but Remy kills Ray. Remy sneaks into his former workplace, stealing jammers to evade other repo men's organ scanners. He demands that Frank clear his account, only to discover this can now only happen at the Union's central office due to his earlier attempt.

Remy and Beth attempt to flee the country at the airport, but security is alerted by bleeding from Beth's knee. A fight ensues, and Jake arrives in time to watch them escape. With help from Beth's associate Asbury, they have Beth's knee replaced by a black-market surgeon. Asbury is killed by Jake, who admits that he rigged the defibrillator to force Remy to stay a repo man by forcing him to get an artificial heart and pay off the debt. Jake then knocks Remy unconscious.

Beth awakens Remy and they narrowly escape a Union raid. Briefly subdued by an anti-Union freedom fighter, Remy decides to free all Union customers from debt. He meets Carol and Peter to say goodbye, giving his manuscript to Peter. Remy and Beth kidnap Frank, using him to break into Union headquarters and fight their way to the server room. The server's only interface is an organ scanner, requiring Remy and Beth to cut themselves open to use the scanner internally on each of their artiforgs, clearing their accounts.

Frank and Jake access the room, finding Beth near death as Remy attempts to scan her heart. Ordered to kill Remy, Jake kills Frank instead, helps revive Beth, and deposits grenades into the server, destroying the mainframe and wiping the records of every Union customer. Sometime later, Remy enjoys his freedom on a tropical beach with Beth and Jake, and Peter has published his father's manuscript, The Repossession Mambo.

However, it is revealed that Remy is actually in a coma, having sustained severe brain damage when Jake knocked him unconscious. Jake has paid off Remy's debt and linked his brain to a neural network, allowing Remy to live out his life peacefully in a computer-generated dream world; their victory over the Union was merely part of this dream. Preparing to deal with an unconscious Beth, Jake says goodbye to Remy, while Frank delivers a sales pitch for the neural network.

== Cast ==
- Jude Law as Remy, a repo man.
- Forest Whitaker as Jake Freivald, Remy's partner.
- Liev Schreiber as Frank Mercer, Remy's boss.
- Alice Braga as Beth, a singer who has multiple artificial organs.
- Carice van Houten as Carol, Remy's wife.
- Chandler Canterbury as Peter, Remy's son.
- RZA as T-Bone, a soul musician in debt.
- Yvette Nicole Brown as Rhodesia, the leader of an underground residence.
- John Leguizamo as Asbury, a black-market organ dealer.
- Liza Lapira as Alva, a black-market surgeon's assistant.
- Joe Pingue as Raymond Pearl, Remy's co-worker sent out to repo his heart.
- Tiffany Espensen as Young Alva.

== Production ==
In 2007, screenwriters Eric Garcia and Garrett Lerner began working with Miguel Sapochnik on a screenplay based on a novel written by Garcia. The novel, Repossession Mambo, was published March 31, 2009.

In June 2007, Universal Studios cast Jude Law and Forest Whitaker. Production began in September 2007. Casting for this film was done by Mindy Marin, production design by David Sandefur, art direction by Dan Yarhi, set decoration by Clive Thomasson, and costume design by Caroline Harris. Filming took place in Toronto, and the Greater Toronto Area in Ontario.

The fight choreography was done by Hiro Koda and Jeff Imada. Forest Whitaker has been a longtime student of Filipino Martial Arts under Dan Inosanto and it is featured heavily in the vicious blade and blunt-weapon fight scenes in the film.

The score was composed by Marco Beltrami, who recorded his score with the Hollywood Studio Symphony at the Newman Scoring Stage at 20th Century Fox.

== Release ==
Repo Men was released theatrically in the United States and Canada on March 19, 2010, having been moved up from an original release date of April 2, 2010. The film was promoted with a seven-minute comic released on Apple.com on March 15, 2010.

The unrated DVD and Blu-ray Disc was released on July 27, 2010.

== Reception ==
=== Critical response ===
Reviews were generally negative. Review aggregation website Rotten Tomatoes gives a score of 22% based on 153 reviews, with an average rating of 4.40/10. The site's consensus is that "Repo Men has an intriguing premise as well as a likable pair of leads, but they're wasted on a rote screenplay, indifferent direction, and mind-numbing gore." Metacritic, which assigns a weighted average score out of 1–100 reviews from film critics, has a rating score of 32% based on 31 reviews. Audiences polled by CinemaScore gave the film an average grade of "B" on an A+ to F scale.

=== Box office ===
Repo Men opened at #4 in its debut weekend in North America with US$6,126,170 in 2,521 theaters, averaging US$2,430 per theater. The film eventually grossed US$17,805,837 worldwide—US$13,794,835 in North America and US$4,011,002 in other territories. In July 2010, Parade Magazine listed the film as the #7 on its list of "Biggest Box Office Flops of 2010 (So Far)."

In the United States and Canada, Repo Men was released alongside The Bounty Hunter and Diary of a Wimpy Kid.

== See also ==
- Elysium (film)
- Repo! The Genetic Opera, a film involving a similar plotline regarding the repossession of transplanted organs
