= Jes Gordon =

- Born: November 7, 1969 (age 56); Poughkeepsie, New York, U.S.
- Occupations: Designer, event producer
- Years active: 1989–present

Jes Gordon (born November 7, 1969) is an American event producer and designer, author, and star of Rocco's Dinner Party on Bravo (US TV network). She is the former host of Fine Living Network's "The Perfect Party", and the resident Event Planning expert on Style Network and MyStyle.com. She is the CEO and Creative Director for her design firm jesGordon/properFUN, and the author of Party Like a Rock Star: A Celebrity Planner's Tips and Tricks for Throwing an Unforgettable Bash.

== Biography ==
Jes Gordon was born on November 7, 1969, in Poughkeepsie, New York. At the age of 13, Gordon got an after school job as a florist's assistant. She's also worked as a set designer for films such as Interview with the Vampire and Dead Man Walking, before becoming Design Director at New York's Tavern on the Green. Her work there led to private commissions, and at the age of 20, she left to start her own firm.

Based in New York, jesGORDON/properFUN consists of two divisions: Event Management and Design.

In Summer 2009, Gordon designed the centerpieces seen on NBC's "TODAY Throws a Wedding," and appeared on E! News and Brides (magazine)'s twelve-part series, "Countdown to the Altar" as the expert wedding planner helping a real couple on a real budget through 12 weeks of wedding preparations. "CUBICLE CHAT: BRIDES is on E! Tonight". Brides Magazine. June 23, 2009.

== Awards ==
Gordon and her team were named as one of BiZBash’s 10 Event Designers to Watch in 2005. Other awards include a 2006 BizBash EventStyle Award and most recently, two 2009 Big Apple Awards, presented by the International Special Events Society.

The International Special Events NY Metro inducted Gordon into the Hall of Legends.

== Appearances ==
- The Perfect Party - Fine Living Network
- Whose Wedding Is It Anyway?
- Style Network - My Style
- E! News - "Countdown to the Altar"
- The Knot LIVE!
- Rocco's Dinner Party
