= Anonymous Rex (novel) =

2000 novel by Eric Garcia

- Genre: Comedy, hardboiled, mystery, science fiction
- ISBN: 0425178218
- Preceded by: Casual Rex
- Followed by: Hot and Sweaty Rex

Anonymous Rex is a novel by Eric Garcia. Released in 2000, the novel is told from the perspective of Vincent Rubio, a Velociraptor private investigator in a world of dinosaurs who integrate themselves into modern society by wearing latex costumes to appear humanoid.

The novel was followed by a prequel, Casual Rex, released in 2002, and a sequel, Hot and Sweaty Rex, released in 2004. Casual Rex served as the basis for a television pilot, Anonymous Rex, released as a TV movie in 2004.

== Reception ==
January magazine called Anonymous Rex a "fast-paced, often very funny fantasy-cum-detective story". The A.V. Club writer Keith Phipps wrote, "ridiculous it is, though still a pleasurable read. Anyone waiting for dino-noir to finally hit bookshelves need wait no longer." Entertainment Weekly gave the novel an A, writing, "Witty, fast-paced detective work makes for a good mystery, but the story's sly, seamlessly conceived dinosaur underworld contains all the elements of a cult classic." BookPage called the novel "stylish, witty, and fast-paced."
