= Vanessa Cantave =

American chef (born 1977)

- Born: October 7, 1977 (age 49); Washington, D.C.
- Education: James Madison University; French Culinary Institute
- Years active: 2005–present
- Culinary career
- Cooking style: New American, French
- Current restaurants
- Yum Yum Catering and Events
- Website: www.yumyumchefs.com

Vanessa Cantave (born October 7, 1977) is an American chef. She is the co-founder and executive chef of the catering company Yum Yum Catering and Events in Dumbo, Brooklyn.

== Early life and education ==
Vanessa Cantave was born in Washington, D.C., in 1977. She is of Haitian descent. Her father served in the United States Army, which resulted in Cantave's moving around a lot as a child. She lived in Mons, Belgium, until the age of six. Her family then returned to the U.S. and lived in various places including Arizona, suburban Chicago, and northern Virginia.

Cantave graduated from James Madison University in Harrisonburg, Virginia, in 1999. She earned her B.A. in political science with a minor in French.

== Career ==
After completing her degree, Cantave worked in several positions in banking, marketing and advertising. She worked at the Federal Deposit Insurance Corporation in Washington, D.C., and later the Federal Reserve in Atlanta, Georgia. She then moved to New York City and accepted a position at the Ogilvy & Mather agency. In 2005, Cantave attended an open house for the French Culinary Institute, where she says she “fell in love.” She decided to quit her job and pursue her passion for food.

Cantave began attending the French Culinary Institute (FCI) in 2005. While attending FCI, she interned at the Daniel restaurant in Manhattan's upper east side, where she studied under renowned French chef Daniel Boulud. After graduating as the valedictorian of her class, she began working as a private chef in New York City and shortly thereafter co-founded her own catering company, Yum Yum Chefs, Inc. (later changed to Yum Yum Catering and Events). Based in DUMBO, Brooklyn, Yum Yum offers catering services for private clients and corporations and themed cooking classes.

== Television and press ==
In 2011, Cantave won the Bravo reality cooking competition Rocco’s Dinner Party. She has appeared on a number of other television programs, including NBC’s The Today Show.
