= Whose Wedding Is It Anyway? =

- Genre: Reality television

Original release
- Network: Style Network

Whose Wedding Is It Anyway? is an American reality TV show on the Style Network. Season 1 began in 2003, Tuesdays, 10 p.m. Each episode runs 60 minutes and follows two different couples who plan their weddings in different states and sometimes a destination wedding in a foreign country.

Each episode begins with the bride and groom meeting the wedding planner to discuss theme and what plans might already have been made. The episode then chronicles the wedding planner at work, coordinating the details of the pre-wedding festivities, including rehearsal, the actual wedding, and the reception. Each affianced couple have unique requests, from flowers, invitations, placecards, the cake, the wedding venue, and the reception. Some of the wedding planners also specialize in cultural weddings.

While the brides are followed to bridal boutiques to pick out the perfect wedding dress, some select two dresses, one for the wedding and one for the reception, to honor special cultural wedding traditions and customs, or simply for a different reception look. The wedding planners help couples, including same-sex couples, explore and celebrate their individuality and personal style, as well as addressing difficult family circumstances.

Voice-over narrators have included Shari Albert and Masasa Moyo.

Those couples featured on the show usually receive a few nights paid accommodation at a resort or hotel as a wedding gift from the Style Network. Couples can apply on-line for consideration. The Web site also provides a list of wedding planners and budget tips.

The show travels to a variety of vendor meetings: dressmakers, florists, reception sites especially. In Season 4 Episode 3 "Pop Stars and Dictators" the show goes to the Hoboken cake shop. This vendor, Buddy, winds up having his own show, Cake Boss, 2 years later. He appears semi-regularly after that: he saves the day (and pranks the bride a little) in S5:E4 "Born to Be a Bride and Last Minute Loss", helps a gay couple with a dream cake on "Lofty Expectations" (S6:E9), and reins in a control-freak bride in "Alter Images" (S6:E10).

== Notable people ==
=== Wedding planners ===
- Ana Cruz
- Jung Lee
- Donnie Brown
- Kevin Covey
- Gina Sole
- James Tramondo
- Jenny Orsini
- Jes Gordon
- Julie Conley
- Kim Bradford
- Linnyette Richardson-Hall
- Michelle Lynn Buckley
- Samantha Goldberg
- Stella Inserra
- Tracy French
- Sasha Souza
- Vicky Johnson
- Shawn Rabideau
- Susan Southerland
- Mark Kingsdorf

Mary Dann also appeared on Whose Wedding Is It Anyway
