= Rico Gagliano =

American journalist, podcaster and radio host

Rico Gagliano is an American journalist, podcaster and radio host. He is best known as the co-host, with Brendan Francis Newnam, of American Public Media’s arts-and-culture radio show and podcast "The Dinner Party Download," and as a reporter for the public radio business show "Marketplace". He has also written for television and for print media, including the New York Times. He is currently Head of Audio at the arthouse film studio, distributor and streaming service MUBI.

== Early life ==
A native of Pittsburgh, he attended and graduated from Mt. Lebanon High School.

== Biography ==
Rico is the son of Frank Gagliano, a playwright and theater educator, and Sandra Gagliano, an opera singer and voice instructor.

He received his B.A. in Film Studies from the University of Pittsburgh, where he was a DJ at college station WPTS-FM. He earned an MFA in Screenwriting from The American Film Institute in Los Angeles.

== Career ==
=== Early career ===
Gagliano contributed arts features and criticism to In Pittsburgh newsweekly (now Pittsburgh City Paper). He briefly served as the paper's music editor. His arts profiles, reviews and previews also appeared regularly in the daily Pittsburgh Post-Gazette.

Upon moving to Los Angeles in 1995, Gagliano freelanced for LA Weekly before turning to public radio and filing features for Marketplace, All Things Considered, Weekend America, and the Savvy Traveler.

Gagliano was a full-time reporter for Marketplace from 2006 to 2010. In addition to domestic and foreign business & economy reporting, he wrote and produced the show's “Marketplace Players” satirical sketches.

=== Dinner Party Download ===
In 2008, Gagliano co-created the podcast “The Dinner Party Download” with Brendan Francis Newnam. The two also co-hosted and co-produced, with Gagliano as primary editor. Begun as an independent bi-weekly, 15-minute show, it was eventually produced and distributed by American Public Media, and expanded to an hour-long weekly radio show in 2011. It ran for 400 episodes and aired on 183 public radio stations.

The show was nominated for multiple podcasting honors, including “Best Arts And Culture Show” at the 2018 Webby Awards. It was named “Best Food and Drink Podcast” by the Academy of Podcasters at the 2016 Podcast Movement conference and was a finalist the following year. Gagliano's interviews garnered two National Arts & Entertainment Journalism awards and a Southern California Journalism Award from the Los Angeles Press Club.

A companion book written by Gagliano and Newnam, “Brunch Is Hell: How to Save the World by Throwing a Dinner Party” was published by Little Brown Inc. in December 2017. The show aired its final all-new episode the same week.

=== Post Dinner Party Download ===
In 2019 and 2020, Gagliano was a recurring guest host for Southern California NPR affiliate KCRW's daily news and culture shows "Press Play" and "Greater L.A.". He earned another Southern California Journalism Award for his "Press Play" profile of Tommy Peltier, an early collaborator of musician Judee Sill.

Gagliano co-hosted two shows for the podcasting network Wondery: "Safe for Work" and "One Plus One." Both ended production in 2020.

Later that year he served as Senior Story Editor for the Crooked Media podcast "Missing America", and as co-writer and co-producer of Wondery's "Jacked: Rise of the New Jack Sound", hosted by Taraji P. Henson. Both were nominated for Webby awards, with "Missing America" winning a "People's Voice" award for "Best Individual Episode - Documentary".

=== MUBI Podcast ===
In 2021, MUBI announced Gagliano would host, write and executive produce its first flagship podcast — a documentary-style show exploring movies and cinema culture. It completed its first season in July 2021. In March 2022, MUBI announced Gagliano had been named Head of Audio for the company, and would continue to host the MUBI Podcast. The twelfth and latest season began airing in April of 2026.

Since its launch, the show has been nominated for three Webby Awards (including "Best Arts/Culture Podcast"), three Ambie awards (including twice for "Best Entertainment Podcast"), and two British Podcast Awards ("Best New Show" and "Best Arts & Culture Show").

=== Television ===
Gagliano was a writer's assistant on the sixth season of the TV sitcom Mad About You. He spent several years thereafter writing for comedy, animation and reality TV, including Disney's Teamo Supremo and Cartoon Network's Hero: 108. He was on the writing staff of MTV's Undressed along with Lost co-creator Damon Lindelof and director Steven S. DeKnight.

=== Print ===
Gagliano contributes music, food, and travel features to the New York Times and the Wall Street Journal.
