= Rocco's Dinner Party =

American reality television series

- Genre: Reality competition
- Created by: Cleve Keller; Dave Noll
- Starring: Rocco DiSpirito; Jes Gordon
- Country of origin: United States
- Original language: English

Production
- Running time: 42 minutes

Original release
- Network: Bravo
- Release: June 15 – August 17, 2011

Rocco's Dinner Party is an American reality competition series which premiered on June 15, 2011, on the Bravo cable network. Each week, three chefs are challenged to craft the perfect dinner party for celebrity chef Rocco DiSpirito and his guests. The contestants are judged on their cooking, service, and décor. The winner of each episode wins $20,000.

== Show format ==
In each episode, three chefs are chosen to compete against each other to create a dinner party for host Rocco DiSpirito and his celebrity guests. The competition consists of two rounds. During the first round, the chefs have one shot at impressing Rocco by creating their signature dish. Sometimes, Rocco gives the contestants only 30 minutes to prepare their signature dish. A Time Timer shows the 30 minutes quickly elapsing as contestants race to finish the assignment. Rocco then selects two chefs to advance to the final round, wherein they must plan and execute the perfect dinner party. Each episode has a theme around which the contestants must base their cuisine and dining experience; this theme guides each contestant to develop his own menu and create a unique party concept. At the end of party, Rocco declares the winner and the winning chef takes home the prize of $20,000.

== Episodes ==
=== Episode 1: Speakeasy ===
On the premiere episode of Rocco's Dinner Party, Executive Chef of Copper Fish on Broadway Geoffrey Johnson, Harlem-based Executive Sous Chef Joseph “J.J.” Johnson and caterer Britt Kurent compete to throw a speakeasy-inspired dinner party. The chefs must create a prohibition-era supper club complete with reminiscent food and décor to impress special guest, chef, and restaurateur Marcus Samuelsson. Other guests include actor and interior designer Bryan Batt (Mad Men), actress Christine Ebersole, television host Kelly Choi, actor Michael Kenneth Williams (Boardwalk Empire, The Wire), and media critic Bill McCuddy.

- WINNER: J.J.
  - RUNNER-UP: Geoffrey
    - ELIMINATED: Britt
- First Aired: June 15, 2011

=== Episode 2: The Mystery Guest ===
Chef and New York restaurant owner King Phojanakang, high school culinary teacher Joel Gargano, and private chef Michelle Karam compete to create the perfect dinner party for Rocco's mystery guest. Armed with a dossier of details on their guest of honor, and with $20,000 at stake, the chefs must design their meal around the secret guest's particular passions –- a star in the culinary community with a taste for travel, a love of spices and a preference for the unfussy. Guests include comedian D.L. Hughley, style and beauty expert Mary Alice Stephenson, Brazilian singer Bebel Gilberto, fashion designer Gilles Mendel, and Glamour magazine Editor-In-Chief Cindi Leive.

- WINNER: Joel
  - RUNNER-UP: King
    - ELIMINATED: Michelle
- First Aired: June 22, 2011

=== Episode 3: Mangia! Mangia! ===
The stakes are high as identical Italian twin brothers Fabrizio and Nicola Carro, along with New Jersey caterer/executive chef Ninamarie Bojekian compete to impress an assembly of Italian elite, including Italian food icon Silvano Marchetto. The chefs face the challenge of turning friends into family with a traditional Italian family style dinner. Guests include The Real Housewives of New Jersey's Caroline and Albert Manzo, television host Sara Gore, comedian Tammy Pescatelli, and singer Joey Fatone.

- WINNER: Fabrizio
  - RUNNER-UP: Ninamarie
    - ELIMINATED: Nicola
- First Aired: June 29, 2011

=== Episode 4: Summer in the City ===
Executive Chef Ryan Poli, Private Chef Jennifer De Palma, and city houses Executive Chef Fabio Capparelli set out to create the most delicious dinner party, with a healthy spin. To take home the $20,000, Rocco's chefs must cook their version of recipes from Rocco's bestseller, Now Eat This! Diet, yet with all the flavor of the higher calorie fare. Guests include editor in chief of Fitness magazine Betty Wong, Olympic trainer and author Joe Downdell, Oscar-nominated actor Chazz Palminteri, comedian Jeffrey Ross, event producer Jung Lee, and Sports Illustrated model Damaris Lewis.

- WINNER: Jennifer
  - RUNNER-UP: Ryan
    - ELIMINATED: Fabio
- First Aired: July 6, 2011

=== Episode 5: Town and Country ===
Connecticut housewife and cooking school owner Nicole Strait, Australian airline chef Corey Roberts, and New York-based vegan chef Ayinde Howell compete to capture the sophisticated taste and glamour of “Town” coupled with the rustic farm-to-table simplicity of “Country.” The chefs must transform Rocco's dining rooms and create a phenomenal menu worthy of the $20,000 prize. Guests include acclaimed chef of Picholine and Artisanal Terrance Brennan, actor Christian Campbell (Big Love), New York City Ballet principal ballerina Tiler Peck, actress Melissa Joan Hart, singer Deborah Cox, and food(ography) host Mo Rocca.

- WINNER: Corey
  - RUNNER-UP: Nicole
    - ELIMINATED: Ayinde
- First Aired: July 13, 2011

=== Episode 6: French Cuisine ===
Chef Daniel Vater, caterer Vanessa Cantave, and biscotti baker Natalie Stone have to whip up a French-themed dinner party using recipes from Julia Child's Mastering the Art of French Cooking as inspiration.

- WINNER: Vanessa
  - RUNNER-UP: Natalie
    - ELIMINATED: Daniel
- First Aired: July 20, 2011

=== Episode 7: Bangers 'N Cash ===
Veteran Executive Chef Kevin Gaudreau, modernist Chef de Partie Janet Kim (from Gordon Ramsey's The London), and upstart Executive Chef Chris Calcagno throw a dinner party. In attempts to capture this culinary trend, Rocco's chefs must elevate British pub food without the stuffy air of fine dining. Even more challenging will be to convince British television host Cat Deeley that she's not far from home. Guests include actress Raven-Symoné, actor Christopher McDonald, founder and creative director of Desiron, Frank Carfaro, New York Times food writer Amanda Hesser. and restaurateur Ken Oringer.

- WINNER: Kevin
  - RUNNER-UP: Janet
    - ELIMINATED: Chris
- First Aired: July 27, 2011

=== Episode 8: Runway Ready ===
Brooklyn caterer Sharon Robustelli, executive private chef Frank Otte, and athlete turned sous chef Bill Haley compete to create a line of dishes inspired by both handmade, high-end fashion, and mass-produced, ready-to-wear clothing. Rocco challenges the chefs, while fashion designer Nicole Miller shows up to surprise the chefs with an twist. Guests include Hairspray star Nikki Blonsky, American Public Media's Dinner Party Download co-hosts Rico Gagliano and Brendan Newnam, Project Runway's Kara Janx, TV Host and Early Show contributor Katrina Szish.

- WINNER: Frank
  - RUNNER-UP: Sharon
    - ELIMINATED: Bill
- First Aired: August 3, 2011

=== Episode 9: Perfect Pairings ===
Achieving the perfect intimate and romantic dinner party is never easy. On this episode of Rocco's Dinner Party, NY caterer Vicki Ferentinos, Minneapolis food truck chef Chris Thompson, and cooking hobbyist (with a Wall Street day job!) Yuki Tsutsui vie for $20,000 as Rocco honors The Daily Show's real life couple Jason Jones and Samantha Bee with a 10th anniversary celebration. The food and decor have to work together to inspire an atmosphere of festive romance while honoring the spirit of this comedic couple.

- WINNER: Vicki
  - RUNNER-UP: Chris
    - ELIMINATED: Yuki
- First Aired: August 10, 2011

=== Episode 10: Liza with a 'B! ===
On this episode of Rocco's Dinner Party, healthy caterer Frank Picchione, opera singer Lucia Palmieri and restaurant owner/chef Antonio Bettencourt vie to throw the best bash ever for Liza Minnelli's 65th Birthday. There's $20,000 at stake; as well as some serious bragging rights- as the chefs compete to throw a fete worthy of the incomparable Liza with a Z!

- WINNER: Frank
  - RUNNER-UP: Lucia
    - ELIMINATED: Antonio
- First Aired: August 17, 2011
