= List of Men at Work episodes =

Men at Work is a TBS sitcom created by Breckin Meyer, which premiered on May 24, 2012. The series follows four guys; Milo, Gibbs, Tyler, and Neal, as they help each other navigate through relationships, friendship and working together at the same magazine.

== Series overview ==
Season	Episodes	Originally released	
Season	Episodes	First released	Last released
1	10	May 24, 2012	July 12, 2012
2	10	April 4, 2013	June 6, 2013
3	10	January 15, 2014	March 12, 2014

== Episodes ==
=== Season 1 (2012) ===
No. overall	No. in season	Title	Directed by	Written by	Original release date	Prod. code	U.S. viewers (millions)
1	1	"Pilot"	Mark Cendrowski	Breckin Meyer	May 24, 2012	100	2.64
2	2	"Milo Full of Grace"	David Trainer	Breckin Meyer	May 24, 2012	101	2.27
3	3	"Devil's Threesome"	James Widdoes	Lon Zimmet & Dan Rubin	May 31, 2012	102	2.04
4	4	"Heterotextual Male"	James Widdoes	Breckin Meyer	June 7, 2012	103	1.87
5	5	"Toilet of Eden"	Mark Cendrowski	Kirk J. Rudell	June 14, 2012	104	1.73
6	6	"Crazy for Milo"	Mark Cendrowski	Eric Weinberg	June 21, 2012	105	2.11
7	7	"Plan B"	Mark Cendrowski	Jared Miller	June 28, 2012	106	2.21
8	8	"Wake and Bake"	Mark Cendrowski	Joel Church-Cooper & Rene Gube	July 5, 2012	107	2.06
9	9	"Inventing Milo"	Mark Cendrowski	Lon Zimmet & Dan Rubin	July 12, 2012	108	1.76
10	10	"Super Milo"	Mark Cendrowski	Kirk J. Rudell	July 12, 2012	109	1.40

=== Season 2 (2013) ===
No. overall	No. in season	Title	Directed by	Written by	Original release date	Prod. code	U.S. viewers (millions)
11	1	"Missed Connections"	David Trainer	Breckin Meyer	April 4, 2013	201	1.68
12	2	"Will Work for Milo"	David Trainer	Story by : Morgan Beck; Teleplay by : Breckin Meyer	April 11, 2013	202	1.71
13	3	"The New Boss"	Leonard R. Garner Jr.	Breckin Meyer	April 18, 2013	203	1.82
14	4	"Downshift"	Leonard R. Garner Jr.	Kirk Rudell	April 25, 2013	204	1.50
15	5	"The Good, the Bad & the Milo"	Steve Zuckerman	Mike Lisbe & Nate Reger	May 2, 2013	205	1.46
16	6	"Tyler the Pioneer"	Linda Mendoza	Breckin Meyer	May 9, 2013	206	1.75
17	7	"Uncle Gibbs"	Linda Mendoza	Jared Miller	May 16, 2013	207	1.34
18	8	"The Gibbs-orcism"	Linda Mendoza	Kirk J. Rudell	May 23, 2013	208	1.55
19	9	"Long Distance Tyler"	Barnet Kellman	Jessica Kaminsky	May 30, 2013	209	N/A
20	10	"Weekend at PJ's"	Barnet Kellman	Breckin Meyer	June 6, 2013	210	N/A

=== Season 3 (2014) ===
No. overall	No. in season	Title	Directed by	Written by	Original release date	Prod. code	U.S. viewers (millions)
21	1	"Pre-Posal"	Andrew D. Weyman	Breckin Meyer	January 15, 2014	301	1.33
Neal tries to work up the courage of asking P.J.'s permission in marrying Amy. As Tyler worries about getting old, Milo asks Gibbs to be his mentor, to be the ultimate mental "Samurai".
22	2	"Post-Posal"	Arlene Sanford	Eric Siegel & Eric Wasserman	January 22, 2014	302	1.52
Neal proposes to Amy, but does not get the answer he expected. Tyler gets accused of "Straight-Baiting" his new billionaire friend (Steven Brand), while Milo fears he was the reason of Amy's decision. Lance Bass makes a cameo appearance in this episode.
23	3	"Holy New Boss!"	Betsy Thomas	Breckin Meyer	January 29, 2014	303	1.38
A new Editor-In-Chief (David Krumholtz) is hired, and he promises to fire one employee at the end of the day. Neal comes to work drunk due to Amy's actions; thus, the guys try to sober him up in order to save his job.
24	4	"I Take Thee, Gibbs"	David Trainer	Erika Kaestle & Patrick McCarthy	February 5, 2014	304	1.55
Selena (Marsha Thomason) returns looking for a Green-Card marriage from Gibbs; while Milo's jealousy is shown when his girlfriend Sasha (Emmanuelle Chriqui) has a same-sex ex. At the office, Neal helps Tyler get on Myron's good side. Ryan Phillippe makes a cameo appearance in this episode.
25	5	"Gigo-Milo"	Andrew D. Weyman	Marsh McCall	February 12, 2014	305	1.63
Milo meets a publisher, Bridgette (Jane Seymour) in order for his idea to get published, but she has ulterior motives. Neal hires an intern, Bob (Ed Asner); while Tyler and Gibbs try to make Myron cool on social media.
26	6	"Hi, Jude"	Linda Mendoza	Nick Adams	February 19, 2014	306	1.45
As Milo works on his novel, Myron replaces his job with a new employee - Jude (Kelen Coleman). Myron attempts to figure out if Jude's single or not, while Tyler tries to get her respect. Neal looks for a new apartment, whereas Gibbs thinks his apartment is haunted. Apolo Ohno makes a cameo appearance in this episode.
27	7	"Molly"	Michael Shea	Breckin Meyer	February 26, 2014	307	1.76
The guys follow a girl that Neal had a brief connection with. Splitting up, and arriving at two different parties, the guys get more than they bargained for, when they realize that they both are at drug-influenced parties. Alanna Masterson makes a cameo appearance in this episode.
28	8	"Suburban Gibbs"	Betsy Thomas	Matt Lawton	March 5, 2014	308	1.69
When Gibbs starts dating a girl (Molly Sims) from the suburbs, Jude warns him that it is very dangerous. Tyler and Milo's friendship is challenged when Tyler offers to pay Milo's half of the rent.
29	9	"Jude Awakening"	Michael McDonald	Neel Shah	March 12, 2014	309	1.31
Tyler attempts in asking Jude out on a date, but her complicated past gets in the way; while Milo tries to get Gibbs to cry fearing that he has been holding his emotions in for too long.
30	10	"Odd Milo Out"	David Trainer	Story by : Lacey Friedman; Teleplay by : Breckin Meyer	March 12, 2014	310	1.12
PJ returns to make big changes in the office, while Tyler and Jude try to keep their relationship a secret. Milo, feeling left out, finds himself alone again on the boys' traditional movie night. Neal finds a new apartment, only to figure out that he is hurting Gibbs' feelings.
