= Strange but True (film) =

American noir-thriller film

- Theatrical release poster
- Directed by: Rowan Athale
- Screenplay by: Eric Garcia
- Based on: Strange but True by John Searles
- Produced by: Fred Berger; Brian Kavanaugh-Jones; Christina Piovesan; Deepak Nayar
- Starring: Amy Ryan; Nick Robinson; Margaret Qualley; Connor Jessup; Blythe Danner; Brian Cox; Greg Kinnear
- Cinematography: Stuart Bentley
- Edited by: Kim Gaster
- Music by: Neil Athale
- Production companies: CBS Films; Motion Picture Capital; Bankside Films; Head Gear Films; Automatik; First Generation Films
- Distributed by: Lionsgate
- Release dates: June 22, 2019 (EIFF); September 6, 2019 (United States)
- Running time: 96 minutes
- Country: United States
- Language: English

Strange but True is a 2019 American thriller film directed by Rowan Athale from a screenplay by Eric Garcia. The film is an adaptation of the 2004 novel of the same name by John Searles and stars Amy Ryan, Nick Robinson, Margaret Qualley, Blythe Danner, Brian Cox, Greg Kinnear and Connor Jessup.

It had its world premiere at the Edinburgh International Film Festival on June 22, 2019. It was released on September 6, 2019, by CBS Films.

== Plot ==
Ronnie Chase died on prom night. Five years later, Melissa Moody, Ronnie's past girlfriend, shows up at his mother’s house and tells both Phillip, Ronnie’s brother, and Charlene, the mother of the two, that she is pregnant with Ronnie's baby. Melissa states that the only man she has ever had sex with was Ronnie and she plays a recording of a psychic reading she received to Charlene and Philip. Charlene angrily asks her to leave.

Melissa is shown at the home of Bill and Gail Erwin, who take her in because her parents don't like her foray into mysticism and obsession with Ronnie's death. Due to their close relationship, Melissa asks the pair to be her guardians for the baby’s sake. Melissa's blackouts are mentioned, as is Bill's penchant for smoking in secret. Bill has a cough and Gail wants him to see a doctor, but he blows it off.

After a tense breakfast between Charlene and Philip, Philip puts forth the idea that Ronnie's frozen sperm could have been used to impregnate Melissa. Charlene goes to the library, where she used to work, to research the idea and then calls her ex-husband, Richard, a physician. She asks him whether or not frozen sperm can be used to impregnate someone. Richard hangs up and later calls Philip and then Bill's Hardware. Meanwhile, Philip visits the same psychic Melissa saw, who tells him he needs to move on from Ronnie's death.

Charlene goes to Erwin's home to speak to Melissa. However, Gail answers the door and mentions that she is thankful that Richard pays rent on behalf of Melissa while she stays in their lodge. Charlene calls Richard again, angry about what Gail has told her. Holly, Richard's new wife, answers the phone and states that Richard is heading to New York to see Charlene. Charlene intercepts Richard at the airport and confronts him about paying Melissa's rent. On the way home, they argue about Melissa and the aftermath of Ronnie's death.

Philip has gone to see Melissa at her cottage. They talk about Philip's broken leg, which broke when he allowed a car to run into him while he worked as a bike messenger. He had moved to New York City because of a plan he made with Ronnie before he died and then was looking for an excuse to leave. Melissa discusses her blackouts and her dreams of Ronnie. In the main cottage, Gail is doing laundry and finds Bill's cigarette stash, as well as a half-used blister pack of pills. She heads to the pharmacy to ask about them. After Bill returns home to an empty house, he checks the laundry room for Gail to no avail, but instead finds his cigarette stash open. Gail meanwhile returns home from the pharmacy and angrily confronts Bill in the basement of their home. He only apologizes for lying about the smoking, but Gail throws the cigarette box with the pills at him. She discovered the pills Rohypnol that he has been secretly giving to Melissa and raping her, thus causing her blackouts and her pregnancy. Gail and Bill end up in a struggle on the stairway; she falls down the stairs and dies on the floor. At the cabin, Melissa's labor begins and Philip takes her to his car to drive her to the hospital. However, she wants him to find Gail and Bill so they can go together. Philip searches the property, and looks through the basement window to find Bill sitting by Gail's body. Philip's phone rings, which causes Bill to notice him, and Bill goes outside with a shotgun to find him. Philip abruptly drops a call to his mother so his parents know to head over to Erwin's home, sensing that Philip is distraught. Bill chases Philip through the woods, eventually catching him and knocking him out with the butt of the shotgun. Melissa drives herself to the hospital.

Bill digs a shallow grave in his barn to bury Philip. Charlene and Richard show up at the house and Bill is able to convince them nothing is amiss. However, Charlene sees one of Philip's crutches on the ground outside. Charlene and Richard go into the house after hearing Phil's phone ring in the yard, only to find Gail's dead body. Bill attempts to bury Philip alive, but Philip wakes up and begins to struggle, calling out so Richard and Charlene hear. Bill starts to choke Philip, but right before he loses consciousness, Philip is able to knock over the shotgun and pull the trigger, alerting his parents. Richard charges in and stands with Philip. Bill raises the shotgun towards Richard and Philip but then Charlene stands between them. Bill says he didn't mean to hurt her and then kills himself.

Melissa gives birth to her baby and a flashback shows the night Ronnie died in an accident while being chauffeured in a limousine. He was standing out the sunroof shouting that he loved Melissa, at her behest, and the limo driver, distracted, crashes. During the flashback is a montage of each family member finding out about Ronnie’s death. In the present, Melissa is seen hugging Charlene, who is seen holding Melissa's baby while Philip and Richard look on.

== Cast ==
- Margaret Qualley as Melissa Moody
- Amy Ryan as Charlene Chase
- Greg Kinnear as Richard Chase
- Nick Robinson as Philip Chase
- Connor Jessup as Ronald “Ronnie” Chase
- Blythe Danner as Gail Erwin
- Mena Massoud as Chaz
- Brian Cox as William “Bill” Erwin
- Janaya Stephens as Pilia
- Sarah Allen as Holly
- Allegra Fulton as Chantrel
- Dipal Patel as Intern
- Darryl Fulton as Vaughn
- Noah Denver as Friend
- Christy Bruce as Nurse
- Tennille Read as ER Nurse
- Joey Parro as Limo Driver
- Vanessa Burns as Doctor

== Production ==
In May 2017, it was announced Amy Ryan, Greg Kinnear, Nick Robinson, Margaret Qualley, Connor Jessup, and Blythe Danner had joined the cast of the film, with Rowan Athale directing from a screenplay by Eric Garcia. In June 2017, Mena Massoud joined the cast of the film. Filming took place in Toronto.

== Release ==
In February 2018, CBS Films acquired distribution rights to the film. It had its world premiere at the Edinburgh International Film Festival on June 22, 2019. It was released on September 6, 2019.

== Reception ==
On the review aggregator website Rotten Tomatoes, 54% of 28 critics' reviews are positive. Metacritic, which uses a weighted average, assigned the film a score of 55 out of 100, based on 7 critics, indicating "mixed or average" reviews.
