= Shawn Rabideau =

Shawn Rabideau (born February 9, 1975) is an American born lifestyle expert and event planner whose work has been featured in numerous television series including "Best Night In" on TVLand, Seasons 8 and 9 of "Whose Wedding Is It Anyway?" on the Style Network.

Rabideau was also cast to star in the pilot episode of "In Full Bloom" on the Halogen Network. In 2010 he was the Wedding Planner for the hit series "Bethenny Getting Married?" on Bravo, and in 2011 he was cast in the second season of "Bethenny Getting Married?", retitled "Bethenny Ever After..." on Bravo.

Rabideau is widely recognized for his eye for design and has worked with numerous celebrities including Barbara Walters, Jennifer Lopez, Star Jones, and Bethenny Frankel. He has served as the lifestyle expert for ABC 13 and has been a featured wedding expert on ABC's "Good Morning America,". Recently Rabideau has been a featured lifestyle and entertaining expert on VH1's "Big Morning Buzz", TV Land's "Best Night In", Better TV, CBS WLNY's "Live from the Couch" and Fox News Live where he is known for his entertaining "Rabidos" and "Rabidon'ts". He has developed a design sense that has been portrayed in magazines and newspapers including The New York Times, The New York Post, Women's World and OK! Magazine.
