= Eric Garcia (writer) =

American writer

- Born: 1972 (age 53–54); Miami, Florida, U.S.
- Education: Cornell University; University of Southern California
- Occupations: Writer, novelist

Eric Garcia (born 1972) is an American writer, the author of several novels including Matchstick Men which was made into a movie directed by Ridley Scott and starring Nicolas Cage, and the Anonymous Rex series, which was adapted in 2004 for the SciFi Channel. He is also a screenwriter, with Garrett Lerner, of the 2010 film Repo Men, based on Garcia's novel The Repossession Mambo. He is the creator and showrunner of the non-linear Netflix heist series Kaleidoscope.

== Career ==
Garcia attended Cornell University to study English and film, then transferred to the University of Southern California during his junior year. His first novel, Anonymous Rex was published in 1999.

The second novel in the Rex series, Casual Rex, was published in 2001, and was a prequel to Anonymous Rex, a fact which was not on the book flap. The inclusion of characters in Casual Rex who were dead in Anonymous Rex confused many fans, who assumed that the book was a sequel.

In 2002, Random House published Matchstick Men, a novel completely different from Garcia's prior work. Warner Brothers had already purchased the film rights and signed Ridley Scott as the director, with Nicolas Cage, Sam Rockwell and Alison Lohman as the film's stars. The film version, released in September 2003, received good reviews but was an average performer at the box office.

2004 was a busy year for Garcia. His third book in the Rex series, Hot And Sweaty Rex, was published early in the year, and in June, HarperCollins/ReganBooks published Cassandra French's Finishing School For Boys, a hard-core satire of the chick-lit genre.

Also in 2004, the SciFi Channel showed the two-hour TV-movie pilot for Anonymous Rex, which was based on Casual Rex but kept the name of the original book. The show received negative reviews from both critics and fans and was never made into a series.

In June 2009, it was announced that Jude Law and Forest Whitaker would star in Repo Men, a movie co-written by Garcia with Garrett Lerner, a writer for Fox Broadcasting's House. The movie is based on Garcia's 2009 original paperback novel for HarperCollins, The Repossession Mambo.

As of 2010, Garcia has also written an adaptation of John Searles book Strange but True, a thriller to be directed by Alex and David Pastor.

In 2012, Garcia wrote and executive-produced to produce a pilot for a TV series adapted from his novel Cassandra French's Finishing School For Boys for MTV, along with actress Krysten Ritter as a fellow exec. producer. It did not go forward as a series.

In 2015, Garcia produced the horror film The Autopsy of Jane Doe.

In 2016, Garcia wrote and executive-produced "Cassandra French's Finishing School," an 8-episode series based on his own novel, and released by DirecTV and Fullscreen.

His adaptation of John Searles' novel "Strange But True" was produced in 2018, and was released in 2019 by CBS Films, starring Amy Ryan, Greg Kinnear, Nick Robinson, Margaret Qualley, Blythe Danner, and Brian Cox.

On January 1, 2023, Netflix released Kaleidoscope, a non-linear heist thriller on which Garcia was showrunner and creator. This is his second project with Ridley Scott, who is an executive producer on the show. Within its first 6 months on air, Kaleidoscope had over 252,000,000 hours viewed, and was the #12 most watched program on Netflix.

== Personal life ==
Eric Garcia married his wife, Sabrina, in 1995, and lives in Southern California with his wife, his children Bailey and Teddy, and their dogs.

== Bibliography ==
=== Standalone Novels ===
- Matchstick Men (2002)
- Cassandra French's Finishing School For Boys (2004)
- The Repossession Mambo (2009), renamed Repo Men after film of same name was made from it

==== Anonymous Rex series ====
- Anonymous Rex (1999)
- Casual Rex (2001)
- Hot and Sweaty Rex (2004)

== Filmography ==
=== Films ===
Year	Title	Writer	Producer	Notes
2003	Matchstick Men	No	No	Based on the novel by Garcia
2004	Anonymous Rex	No	Co-executive	Co-executive producer, based on a novel by Garcia
2010	Repo Men	Yes	No	Co-wrote with Garrett Lerner, based on a novel by Garcia
2012	Cassandra French's Finishing School For Boys	Yes	Executive	Pilot only
2016	The Autopsy of Jane Doe	No	Yes	
2017	Cassandra French's Finishing School	Yes	Executive	Based on the novel by Garcia
2019	Strange but True	Yes	No	

=== Television ===
Year	Title	Writer	Creator	Executive Producer
2023	Kaleidoscope	Yes	Yes	Yes
