= Stephanie Lemelin =

American actress and screenwriter

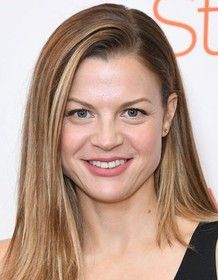
- Citizenship: United States
- Education: University of Pennsylvania
- Occupations: Actress; screenwriter; animal rights activist
- Years active: 2001–present
- Father: Réjean Lemelin

Stephanie Lemelin is an American actress and screenwriter. She is known for voicing Artemis Crock in Young Justice, Eep in Dawn of the Croods and Audrey in Harvey Girls Forever!.

== Early years ==
Lemelin's father is former NHL goalie Réjean Lemelin. She graduated in 2001 from the University of Pennsylvania.

== Career ==
In 2007, she joined In-Motion Pictures as a writer and producer of independent films. She co-wrote screenplays for Absolute Fear (formerly known as Project Fear) and Special Ops (formerly titled Disarmed).

In 2008, Lemelin began voice-over work, playing an animated character in Kung Fu Panda franchise, as well as voicing several commercials. In 2010, she began voicing Artemis Crock in Young Justice. In November 2016, production began for the third season of Young Justice, titled Young Justice: Outsiders, with Lemelin as a key cast member.

Lemelin also has recurring characters in other animated series such Fanboy & Chum Chum (as Nurse Lady Pam) and the Skechers-produced film Twinkle Toes (playing Sporty Shorty).

As of 2011, in addition to acting in several studio and independent films (Playdate, WER, Get the Gringo, Absolute Fear, and The Republic of Two), Lemelin has been cast in 12 consecutive TV pilots (several of which went to series), including Men at Work (TNT), $#*! My Dad Says (CBS), The Whole Truth (ABC), Bunker Hill (TNT), Canned (ABC), Good Behavior (ABC), Cavemen (ABC), The Funkhousers (ABC), as well as FOX's Worst Week of My Life, Dirtbags, and Titletown, and had a lead in the SciFi Channel's original TV movie/back door pilot Anonymous Rex based on the books by Eric Garcia. Lemelin has also guest-starred in many network shows, with comedic and dramatic roles on Bones (FOX), The Mentalist (CBS), Brothers and Sisters (ABC), The League (FX), The Closer (TNT), Melissa & Joey (ABC Family), CSI: Las Vegas (CBS), Malcolm in the Middle (Fox), Rules of Engagement (CBS), Run of the House (WB), Out of Practice (CBS) and The Mullets (UPN). Her network television debut was on the Fox series Undeclared, in which she was cast one month after moving to Los Angeles.

== Volunteerism ==
In 2010, Lemelin joined the board of the nonprofit Angel City Pit Bulls. Since 2002, she has regularly volunteered with Los Angeles-based Free Arts for Abused Children, and she is a regular volunteer for Best Friends Animal Society, including for its Pup My Ride program, which transports small dogs from high-kill animal shelters to other parts of the United States where there is a greater demand for small dogs. Lemelin had a pit bull named Brucely, who served as inspiration for Artemis' dog of the same name in Young Justice.

== Filmography ==
=== Film ===
Year	Title	Role	Notes
2005	The 40-Year-Old Virgin	Woman #2	Uncredited
2006	Raising Flagg	Jenny Purdy	
2008	Secrets of the Furious Five	Mei Ling (voice)	Short film
2009	Operation Midnight Climax	June	Short film
2011	Twinkle Toes	Sporty Shorty (voice)	
2012	Get the Gringo	Secretary	
2013	Wer	Claire Porter	
2016	The Boy	Sandy (voice)	
2018	Charming	Additional voices	Netflix film

=== Television ===
Year	Title	Role	Notes
2002	Undeclared	Tara	Episode: "The Day After"
2003	The Mullets	Stephanie	Episode: "Love Freakin' Story"
2003	Run of the House	Michelle	Episode: "Chris's College Friend"
2004	Malcolm in the Middle	Christie	Episode: "Malcolm Visits College"
2004	Anonymous Rex	Gabrielle Watson	Television film
2006	CSI: Crime Scene Investigation	Ally Sullivan	Episode: "Killer"
2006	Out of Practice	Danielle	Episode: "The Lady Doth Protest Too Much"
2007–08	Cavemen	Thorne	13 episodes
2008	Rules of Engagement	Kerry	Episode: "Buyer's Remorse"
2010	90210	Amy	Episode: "What's Past Is Prologue"
2010	Ghost Whisperer	Gale Anderson	Episode: "Dead Ringer"
2010	$h*! My Dad Says	Sam	Uncredited; Episode: "Pilot"
2010	Shake It Up	Karen Thomas	Episode: "Age It Up"
2010–11	The Whole Truth	Rhonda	13 episodes
2010–22	Young Justice	Artemis Crock, Catherine Cobert, Olga Ilyich / Red Rocket, Justice League Computer (voice)	63 episodes
2011	Brothers & Sisters	Berklee Makowska	Episode: "Olivia's Choice"
2011	Melissa & Joey	Isabel Ryan	Episode: "Joe Versus the Reunion"
2011	The League	Waitress	Episode: "The Au Pair"
2011	The Closer	Claudia Shipley	Episode: "Relative Matters"
2011–12	Fanboy & Chum Chum	Nurse Pam (voice)	2 episodes
2012	The Mentalist	Vicki Lang	Episode: "Son Long, and Thanks for All the Red Snapper"
2012	Bones	Alexa Eaton	Episode: "The But in the Joke"
2012–13	Men at Work	Rachel	3 episodes
2013	Satisfaction	Claire	Episode: "The Internship, Relationship, Friendship"
2014	Being Human	Wendy	2 episodes
2014	NCIS	Melody Hanson	Episode: "Page Not Found"
2014	The Young and the Restless	Jenna Rayburn	4 episodes
2015–17	Dawn of the Croods	Eep (voice)	51 episodes
2016	Girl Meets World	Anastasia Boulangerie	Episode: "Girl Meets Hollyworld"
2018	Code Black	Keri Berlinger	Episode: "As Night Comes and I'm Breathing"
2018–20	Harvey Girls Forever!	Audrey, additional voices	52 episodes
2019	iZombie	Melissa Schultz	Episode: "Dot Zom"
2019	Cousins for Life	Charlotte	3 episodes
2019	Curious George	Kieren (voice)	Episode: "Orange Crush/Monkey Market"
2019	9-1-1	Stella	Episode: "Monsters"
2019–21	Lego City Adventures	Rooky Partnur (voice)	11 episodes
2020	Chicago Med	Elaine Beck	Episode: "I Will Do No Harm"
2020	The Rocketeer	Xena Treme, Svetlana, Purse Lady (voices)	3 episodes
2020	DC Super Hero Girls	Shiera Sanders (voice)	Episode: "#BirdAndTheBee"
2022	NCIS: Los Angeles	Mary Smith	Episode: "MWD"
2022–present	Spidey and His Amazing Friends	Electro (voice)	Recurring role
2023–25	Transformers: EarthSpark	Hashtag (voice)	10 episodes

=== Video games ===
Year	Title	Role	Notes
2012	Call of Duty: Black Ops II	Abigail "Misty" Briarton	
2012	Hitman: Absolution	Nun #4	
2013	Aliens: Colonial Marines	Lisbeth Hutchins	
2013	The Croods: Prehistoric Party!	Eep	
2013	The Wonderful 101	Immorta	
2013	Grand Theft Auto V	The Local Population	
2013	Young Justice: Legacy	Artemis Crock	
2014	Lightning Returns: Final Fantasy XIII	Additional Voices	
2014	Sunset Overdrive	Female Player	
2015	Metal Gear Solid V: The Phantom Pain	Soldiers	
2015	Skylanders: SuperChargers	Stormblade	
2015	Fallout 4	The Mechanist	Automatron DLC
2016	Fire Emblem Fates	Corrin (Female)	
2016	Lego Star Wars: The Force Awakens	First Order Pilot	
2018	Metal Gear Survive	Player	
2018	Marvel's Spider-Man	Screwball	
2018	Call of Duty: Black Ops 4	Specialist Zero / Abigail "Misty" Briarton	
2018	Red Dead Redemption II	Additional voices	
2018	Fallout 76	Robobrain	
2019	Days Gone	Additional Voices	
2022	Saints Row	Idols Characters	
