= Anonymous Rex (film) =

- Genre: Mystery; Science fiction
- Based on: Casual Rex by Eric Garcia
- Written by: Joe Menosky
- Directed by: Julian Jarrold
- Starring: Sam Trammell; Daniel Baldwin; Stephanie Lemelin; Tamara Gorski; Faye Dunaway; Isaac Hayes
- Theme music composer: David Bergeaud
- Country of origin: United States
- Original language: English

Production
- Producers: Eric Garcia; Daniel J. Heffner; Joe Menosky
- Cinematography: Albert J. Dunk; Kit Whitmore
- Editors: Mark Conte; Kevin D. Ross
- Running time: 90 minutes

Original release
- Network: Sci Fi Channel
- Release: 2004

Anonymous Rex is a 2004 science fiction film directed by Julian Jarrold and starring Sam Trammell and Daniel Baldwin. The film was produced as a "backdoor pilot" for an unproduced television series of the same name. It is based on the novel Casual Rex by Eric Garcia. It was aired on Sci Fi Channel.

== Plot ==
In an alternate timeline, dinosaurs have managed to survive the KT Extinction Event, having since evolved into humanoid forms and now live amongst humans using hard light holographic disguises (formerly rubber suits, paper masks, etc). Vincent Rubio is a Velociraptor private investigator along with his partner, Ernie Watson, a Triceratops.

When Ernie's ex-girlfriend's brother is found dead, the incident is dismissed as suicide. However she doesn't believe her brother would kill himself and asks Ernie to investigate ("for free," Vincent observes). When the pair investigate the crime scene, Vincent notices the scent of another dinosaur on the windowsill, concluding it was not a suicide.

At the funeral Vincent talks to a man dressed in a strange suit who belongs to the cult that the deceased had previously joined, "The Voice of Progress." He pretends to be interested in their ideals and gets himself and Ernie invited to a gathering. During the funeral, Vincent detects the same scent from the victim's bedroom, indicating the killer is nearby.

Vincent and Ernie go to the cult meeting where they are told the Voice of Progress' ideals and history: The Voice of Progress is revealed to be both the title of their leader and a collection of dinosaurs who believe that the prolonged use of disguises has robbed the dinosaur community of its unique identity. The cult also believes that humans have caused dinosaurs to see themselves as monsters and humans as normal. While Ernie appears indifferent to the cult's ideals, Vincent is profoundly impacted by the cult's beliefs.

As their investigation continues, Vincent and Ernie come to realize what one man in the cult is planning: a dinosaurian revolution by turning cult members into violent, feral dinosaurs and releasing them on the humans. The resulting conflict will force both sides to face each other, and allow dinosaurs to reveal themselves. Though Vincent is somewhat sympathetic to the cult, he disagrees with the idea of a violent revolution (knowing it could end in disaster for both sides), leaving him unsure which side he's on.

== Cast ==
- Sam Trammell as Vincent Rubio
- Daniel Baldwin as Ernie Watson
- Stephanie Lemelin as Gabrielle Watson
- Tamara Gorski as Circe
- Alan van Sprang as Raal
- Isaac Hayes as Elegant Man
- Faye Dunaway as Shin

== Dinosaurs featured ==
- Velociraptor
- Triceratops
- Carnotaurus
- Brontosaurus
- Stegosaurus
- Tyrannosaurus
- Allosaurus

== Production ==
The pilot was originally produced for the Fox network, but was picked up by the Sci-Fi Channel instead.

== See also ==
- List of American films of 2004
- List of films featuring dinosaurs
- Eric Garcia
