= John Searles =

American writer

John Searles is an American writer and book critic. He is the author of five novels: Single Girls inspired by his years as an editor at Cosmopolitan and his friendship with the controversial feminist editor and writer Helen Gurley Brown as well as Her Last Affair (ISBN 0-06-077965-9), Help For The Haunted (ISBN 978-0-06-077963-4), Strange But True (ISBN 0-06-072179-0) and Boy Still Missing (ISBN 0-06-082243-0). His essays have appeared in national magazines and newspapers, such as The New York Times and Washington Post and he contributes frequently to morning television shows as a book critic. He is based in New York City.

== Life ==
Born and raised in New England, Searles is the son of a truck driver and stay-at-home mother. After high school, Searles worked at the DuPont factory close to his hometown of Monroe, Connecticut. He went on to pursue an undergraduate degree from Southern Connecticut State University, becoming the first member of his family to attend college, before entering a graduate program at New York University on a writing scholarship, where he won a number of fiction awards and received a Master of Fine Arts degree in creative writing. He is married to theatre director Thomas Caruso.

After completing his master's degree, Searles took a job at Redbook magazine reading fiction submissions. He soon moved on to a part-time job in the books department at Cosmopolitan, where he went on to hold many positions including Books Editor, Executive Editor, Editorial Brand Director and Editor-at-Large.

Upon the 2001 publication of Searles' first novel, Boy Still Missing, Time named him a "Person to Watch" and the New York Daily News named him a "New Yorker to Watch." His second novel, Strange But True, was named the best novel of 2004 by Salon.com. Searles' novel Help for the Haunted, published by William Morrow/HarperCollins in September 2013, won the American Library Association Alex Award, was named as an Amazon Top 10 Mystery and Suspense Novel of 2013, a Boston Globe Top 10 Crime Novel of 2013, and an Entertainment Weekly Top Ten Must Read, and was hailed by author Gillian Flynn as "dazzling… a novel both frightening and beautiful."

His essays have appeared in The Washington Post, the New York Times, and other national magazines and newspapers. He has featured frequently as a book critic on morning television shows including NBC's Today Show, CBS's The Early Show, Live! With Regis and Kelly, Charlie Rose, and CNN to discuss his favorite book selections.

In 2019, a film adaptation of Strange But True was released by Lionsgate and CBS Films..Directed by Rowan Athale, the film starred Amy Ryan, Nick Robinson, Margaret Qualley, Blythe Danner, Brian Cox, Greg Kinnear and Connor Jessup. It premiered at the Edinburgh International Film Festival on June 22. 2019 and received wide release on September 6, 2019.
