= Men at Work (TV series) =

- Genre: Sitcom
- Created by: Breckin Meyer
- Starring: Danny Masterson; Michael Cassidy; Adam Busch; Meredith Hagner; James Lesure
- Composer: John Swihart
- Country of origin: United States
- Original language: English
- No. of seasons: 3
- No. of episodes: 30 (list of episodes)

Production
- Executive producers: Breckin Meyer; Jamie Tarses; Julia Franz
- Camera setup: Multi-camera
- Running time: 22 minutes
- Production companies: Monkey Shoe Productions; FanFare Productions; Sony Pictures Television

Original release
- Network: TBS
- Release: May 24, 2012 – March 12, 2014

Men at Work is an American sitcom that aired on TBS. The series was created by Breckin Meyer and stars Danny Masterson, Michael Cassidy, Adam Busch, James Lesure, and Meredith Hagner. The series premiered on May 24, 2012.

On May 11, 2014, TBS canceled Men at Work after three seasons.

== Synopsis ==
The series follows Milo (Danny Masterson), a man who recently ended his relationship with his girlfriend, Lisa, and tries to re-enter the dating scene with the help of his three best friends/co-workers, Tyler, Gibbs, and Neal (Michael Cassidy, James Lesure, Adam Busch). Neal is the only one who has a girlfriend, Amy (Meredith Hagner). Together, the four friends help each other navigate through relationships, friendship and working together in New York City at the same magazine, Full Steam. The gang mainly hangs out at the diner or at the workplace.

== Cast and characters ==
=== Main cast ===
- Danny Masterson as Milo Foster
- James Lesure as Gibbs
- Michael Cassidy as Tyler Mitchell
- Adam Busch as Neal Bradford
- Meredith Hagner as Amy Jordan (seasons 1–2; recurring, season 3)

=== Recurring cast ===
- J. K. Simmons as P.J. Jordan, Owner of Full Steam Magazine and Amy's father
- Joel David Moore as Doug, the season one chief editor of Full Steam Magazine
- Stephanie Lemelin as Rachel, Tyler's ex-girlfriend that once had a threesome with Gibbs
- Amy Smart as Lisa, Milo's ex-girlfriend
- Peri Gilpin as Alex, the season two chief editor of Full Steam Magazine
- Sarah Wright as Molly, Milo's ex-girlfriend
- David Krumholtz as Myron, the season three (current) editor Full Steam magazine
- Marsha Thomason as Selena
- Kelen Coleman as Jude

== Episodes ==
Season	Episodes	Originally released	
Season	Episodes	First released	Last released
1	10	May 24, 2012	July 12, 2012
2	10	April 4, 2013	June 6, 2013
3	10	January 15, 2014	March 12, 2014

== Development and production ==
The pilot appeared on TBS's development slate in May 2011. The series was created by Breckin Meyer, who also serves as executive producer alongside Jamie Tarses and Julia Franz, and the production companies, Sony Pictures Television and FanFare Productions. On August 26, 2011, TBS placed a pilot order for Men at Work.

In September 2011, Danny Masterson, James Lesure, Adam Busch, and Michael Cassidy were cast as the four leads, with Masterson playing the role of Milo, the recently dumped guy whose friends try to help him get back in the dating scene; Lesure playing the role of Gibbs, a ladies' man and photographer at the magazine; Busch playing the role of Neal, a reporter at the magazine and the only one in the group with a girlfriend; and Cassidy playing the role of Tyler, a stylish feature writer. Meredith Hagner was the final addition to the cast as Amy, Neal's girlfriend whose father owns the magazine.

On January 6, 2012, TBS picked up Men at Work for a first season of 10 episodes that premiered on May 24, 2012. Production on the first season began in April 2012.

On August 20, 2013, TBS picked up Men at Work for a third season of 10 episodes. Season 3 premiered on January 15, 2014.

On May 11, 2014, TBS canceled Men at Work after three seasons.
