= The Comeback Trail =

The Comeback Trail may refer to:

- The Comeback Trail (1982 film), American comedy film
- The Comeback Trail (2020 film), remake of the 1982 film
