= That's Adequate =

- Theatrical release poster
- Directed by: Harry Hurwitz
- Written by: Harry Hurwitz
- Produced by: Harry Hurwitz; Irving Schwartz; John Manocherian
- Starring: Tony Randall; James Coco; Robert Downey Jr. Jerry Stiller; Bruce Willis; Ben Stiller; Anne Meara
- Narrated by: Tony Randall
- Cinematography: João Fernandes
- Distributed by: Southgate Entertainment
- Release dates: January 1989 (United States Film Festival); January 1, 1990 (United States)
- Running time: 82 minutes
- Country: United States
- Language: English

That's Adequate is a 1990 mockumentary documenting a fictional Hollywood studio, Adequate Film Studios. Narrated and hosted by Tony Randall, the film features an all-star cast including James Coco (in his final film role), Robert Downey Jr., Anne Meara, Jerry Stiller, Bruce Willis and Ben Stiller.

It was also the last movie for actress Ina Balin, who had appeared in Hurwitz's previous films such as The Projectionist and The Comeback Trail.

== Premise ==
That's Adequate is a documentary about a fictional Hollywood film studio.

== Cast ==
- Tony Randall as Host
- James Coco as Max Roebling
- Jerry Stiller as Sid Lane
- Anne Meara as Charlene Lane
- Ina Balin as Sister Mary Enquirer
- Irwin Corey as D.W. Godilla
- Chuck McCann as Lowell
- Susan Dey as Southern Belle
- Maureen McCormick as Space Princess
- Rita Rudner as Frieda
- Robert Vaughn as Hitler
- Richard Lewis as Pimples
- Peter Riegert as Adult Baby Elroy
- Ben Stiller as Chip Lane
- Robert Downey Jr. as Einstein
- Bruce Willis as himself
