= The Property (artists colony) =

Art colony located in Malibu

The Property was the name of an artists colony located in Malibu that lasted from 1962 to 1993. It was home to artists and actors such as Lita Albuquerque, Elyn Zimmerman, Arthur Malet, Patrick Villiers Farrow, Mia Farrow and Michael Greene.

== History ==
The Property was located on the 132-acre land that had housed Malibu's Coffee House Positano, on a hill overlooking California's highway 1. The coffee house became a focal point for southern California artists of the 1960s and 1970s to congregate and collaborate. It housed live avant-garde theater, political debates, lectures and art displays including the premiere of a play by Pablo Picasso.

Soon after Positano closed in 1962, John Wilder, an actor and budding scriptwriter, and Jerry Ziegman, also an aspiring screenwriter, established an artists community on the location simply called "The Property." Initially, Ziegman's intention was to use the place as a weekend retreat to relax and have parties. This evolved into an attempt to invent a new kind of artists colony. Ziegman believed that creativity was insufficiently rewarded in America, and wanted to rent spaces to artists he thought could benefit from having an inexpensive place to work and live. In his uncompleted memoir, Malibu Book 1962-1982, he characterized his creation as a “Commune of Autocrats.”

For the next 31 years over 50 people lived at The Property. Among the residents were scriptwriters such as David Seidler, John Wilder and Jacqueline Feather; Rosa Jordan, a writer; Lita Albuquerque and Elyn Zimmerman, environmental artists; Jim Fiorito, a painter; Bond Johnson, a musician/poet; Susan Farrow, a weaver; actors such as Arthur Malet, Patrick Villiers Farrow, Mia Farrow and Michael Greene; Steve Kahn, a photographer; Aino Paasonen, a poet; Pamela Burton, a landscape architect; Richard Hertz, an art historian; Bruce Dath, a Buddhist truck driver/contractor; Rabbi Don Singer, a Zen rabbi; and Karla Conway, a Playmate of the Month.

The Property was unique among other artists colonies in that it was not funded through private means or foundations. Artists were allowed to stay indefinitely, and families with children were welcome.

== Destruction and legacy ==
The colony was destroyed in the 1993 Malibu fire.

Many of the residents reported that living at The Property had a profound impact on their lives. They returned annually to the ruins to remember their lives at this place and to renew old friendships.
