= FleshTones =

May refer to:

- Albums
  - Flesh Tone, 2010 album by American recording artist Kelis
  Bands
  - The Fleshtones, American garage rock band.
  Films
  - Fleshtone, 1994 film.
