= Ina Rosenberg =

Ina Rosenberg is the name of:

- Ina Rosenberg Garten, American chef and TV presenter
- Ina Rosenberg Balin, American actress
