= Irwin Corey =

American comedian and actor (1914–2017)

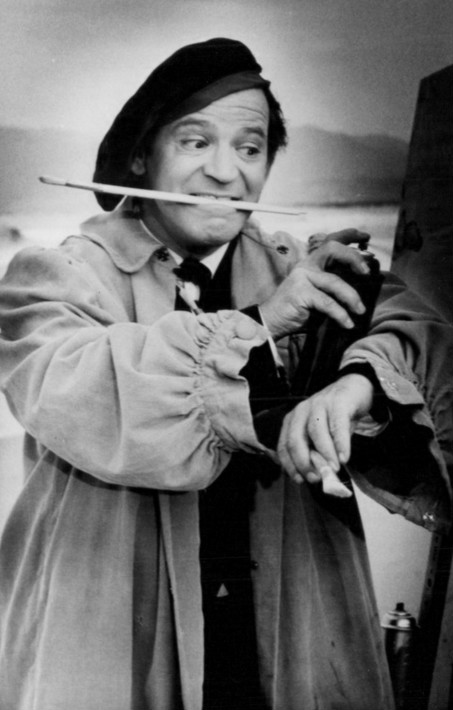
- Corey in a 1963 television appearance
- Born: July 29, 1914; New York City, U.S.
- Died: February 6, 2017 (aged 102); New York City, U.S.
- Spouse: Fran Corey (m. 1941; died 2011)
- Children: 2

Comedy career
- Years active: 1938–2013
- Medium: Actor; stand-up comedian; activist
- Genres: Wit; word play; improvisational comedy; character comedy; satire

Irwin Corey (July 29, 1914 – February 6, 2017) was an American stand-up comic, film actor and activist, often billed as "The World's Foremost Authority". He introduced his unscripted, improvisational style of stand-up comedy at the San Francisco club the hungry i. Lenny Bruce described Corey as "one of the most brilliant comedians of all time."

== Background ==
Corey was born Irwin Eli Cohen to a Jewish family on July 29, 1914, in Brooklyn, New York. Poverty-stricken after his father deserted the family, his mother was forced to place him and his five siblings in the Hebrew Orphan Asylum of New York, where Corey remained until his early teens. He then rode in boxcars out to California, and enrolled himself at Belmont High School in Los Angeles. During the Great Depression he worked for the Civilian Conservation Corps and, while working his way back East, became a featherweight Golden Gloves boxing champion.

Corey supported Communist/Socialist left-wing politics. He appeared in support of Cuban children, Mumia Abu-Jamal, and the American Communist Party, and was blacklisted in the 1950s, the effects of which he stated lingered throughout his life. (Corey never returned to Late Night with David Letterman after his first appearance in 1982, which he claimed was a result of the blacklist still being in effect.) During the 1960 election, Corey campaigned for president on Hugh Hefner's Playboy ticket. During the 2016 Democratic Party presidential primaries, Corey endorsed Vermont United States Senator Bernie Sanders for the nomination and presidency. Corey was a frequent guest on The Tonight Show hosted by Johnny Carson during the late 1960s and early 1970s.

When the publicity-shy Thomas Pynchon won the National Book Award Fiction Citation for Gravity's Rainbow in 1974, he asked Corey to accept it on his behalf. The New York Times described the resulting speech as "... a series of bad jokes and mangled syntax which left some people roaring with laughter and others perplexed."

In Robert A. Heinlein's science fiction novel Friday, the eponymous heroine says

At one time there really was a man known as "the World's Greatest Authority." I ran across him in trying to nail down one of the many silly questions that kept coming at me from odd sources. Like this: Set your terminal to "Research." Punch parameters in succession "North American culture," "English-speaking," "mid-twentieth century," "comedians," "the World's Greatest Authority." The answer you can expect is "Professor Irwin Corey." You'll find his routines timeless humor.

== Career ==
=== Comedy ===
In 1938 Corey returned to New York, where he got a job writing and performing in Pins and Needles, a musical comedy revue about a union organizer in the "garment district". He claimed that he was fired from this job for his union organizing activities. Five years later, he was working in New Faces of 1943 and appearing at the Village Vanguard, doing his stand-up comedy routine. He was drafted during World War II, but was discharged after six months, after he claimed he convinced an Army psychiatrist that he was a homosexual.

From the late 1940s Corey cultivated his "Professor" character. Dressed in seedy formal wear and sneakers, with his bushy hair sprouting in all directions, Corey would amble on stage in a preoccupied manner, then begin his monologue with "However …" He created a new style of double-talk comedy; instead of making up nonsense words like "krelman" and "trilloweg", like double-talker Al Kelly, the Professor would season his speech with many long and florid, but authentic, words. The professor would then launch into observations about anything under the sun, but seldom actually making sense.

However … we all know that protocol takes precedence over procedure.

This parliamentary point of order based on the state of inertia of developing a centrifugal force issued as a catalyst rather than as a catalytic agent, and hastens a change reaction and remains an indigenous brier to its inception.

This is a focal point used as a tangent so the bile is excreted through the pancreas.

Changing topics suddenly, Corey would wander around the stage, pontificating all the while. His quick wit allowed him to hold his own against the most stubborn straight man, heckler or interviewer. One fan of Corey's comedy, despite their radically different politics, was Ayn Rand. Theatre critic Kenneth Tynan wrote of the Professor in The New Yorker, "Corey is a cultural clown, a parody of literacy, a travesty of all that our civilization holds dear, and one of the funniest grotesques in America. He is Chaplin's tramp with a college education". Corey frequently appeared at the hungry i nightclub in the 1950s and '60s, and remained the favorite comedian of club owner Enrico Banducci. In 1980, Corey appeared with Banducci, Mort Sahl, Jonathan Winters, Bill Cosby, Jackie Vernon, and Maya Angelou in a tribute to the hungry i entitled hungry i Reunion, televised in 1981 on PBS.

In 1975, Corey gave a typically long-winded, nonsensical performance in New York City for journalists waiting for The Rolling Stones to announce the band's 1975 tour of the Americas. The press was still listening to Corey ramble on when they finally noticed that the Stones were playing "Brown Sugar" on a flatbed truck driving down Fifth Avenue.

=== Broadway ===
In 1951, Corey appeared as "Abou Ben Atom", the Genie, in the cult flop Broadway musical Flahooley along with Yma Sumac, the Bil and Cora Baird Marionettes, and Barbara Cook (in her Broadway debut). Corey's performance of "Springtime Cometh" can be heard on the show's original cast album. He also appeared in the Broadway play, "Mrs. McThing," in 1952, with Helen Hayes, Jules Munshin and Brandon deWilde.

=== Film and television ===
Corey appeared occasionally in 1950s television as a character actor. He appeared in an episode of The Phil Silvers Show titled "Bilko's Grand Hotel", in which Corey plays an unkempt Bowery bum being passed off as a hotelier by Sgt. Bilko. The Professor was a frequent guest comic on variety shows and a guest panelist on game shows during the 1960s and 1970s.

Corey became so synonymous with comic erudition that in June 1977, when a Providence, Rhode Island television station, WJAR, wanted a spokesman to explain changes in network affiliations, Corey got the job. Lecturing with pointer in hand, Corey manipulated magnetic signs to demonstrate how television schedules would be disrupted. By the end of the commercial, the professor had wandered from his original point, and the magnetic field holding the visual aids in place was turned off, causing the set to collapse around Corey. He would do the same promos for WTMJ-TV in Milwaukee that same year, when rival stations WITI and WISN-TV switched affiliations.

Corey often appeared on The Steve Allen Show (1962–1964), whereupon he would end his rambling stand-up routine with Allen and stagehands literally chasing Corey with a giant butterfly net. He later guest starred on The Donald O'Connor Show in 1968. Corey appeared in various Broadway productions, including as a gravedigger in a production of Hamlet.

In 2009 filmmaker Jordan Stone began filming what was to become an award-winning documentary film called Irwin & Fran. Political activist and fellow stand-up comedian Dick Gregory shared some in-depth and provocative memories and Academy Award-winning actress Susan Sarandon narrated in a very personal tone. The film won The People's Film Festival Best Film Award in 2013.

== Personal life and death ==
Corey was married for 70 years to Frances Berman Corey, who died in May 2011. The couple had two children, Margaret Davis, née Corey, an actress, and Richard Corey, a painter. Their two grandsons are Amadeo Corey and Corey Meister. Irwin Corey turned 100 in July 2014.

For an interview in October 2011, the 97-year-old Corey invited a New York Times reporter to visit his 1840 carriage house on East 36th Street. Corey estimated its resale value at $3.5 million. He said that, when not performing, he panhandled for change from motorists exiting the Queens–Midtown Tunnel, in exchange for cleaning their windshields with a squeegee. Every few months, he told the interviewer, he donated the money to a group that purchased medical supplies for Cuban children. He said of the drivers who supplied the cash, "I don't tell them where the money's going, and I'm sure they don't care." Irvin Arthur, Corey's agent for half a century, assured the reporter that Corey did not need the money for himself. "This is not about money," Arthur said. "For Irwin, this is an extension of his performing." In his memoir, Phoning Home, Jacob M. Appel cites a personal encounter with Corey on a street in New York City as the basis for his novel, The Man Who Wouldn't Stand Up.

Corey died at the age of 102 on February 6, 2017, at his apartment in Manhattan with his son, Richard, at his side.

== Filmography ==
- How to Commit Marriage (1969) – The Baba Ziba
- Fore Play (1975) – Professor Irwin Corey
- Car Wash (1976) – The Mad Bomber
- Thieves (1977) – Joe Kaminsky (reprising his stage role)
- Chatterbox! (1977) – Himself
- Fairy Tales (1979) – Dr. Eyes
- The Comeback Trail (1982) – Himself
- Stuck on You! (1982) – Judge Gabriel
- Crackers (1984) – Lazzarelli
- That's Adequate (1989) – D.W. Godilla
- Jack (1996) – Poppy
- I'm Not Rappaport (1996) – Sol
- The Curse of the Jade Scorpion (2001) – Charlie
- Irwin & Fran (2013) – Himself
