= The Young Doctors (film) =

1961 film by Phil Karlson

- Theatrical release poster
- Directed by: Phil Karlson
- Written by: Joseph Hayes
- Based on: novel "The Final Diagnosis" by Arthur Hailey
- Produced by: Stuart Millar; Lawrence Turman
- Starring: Fredric March; Ben Gazzara; Dick Clark; Ina Balin; Eddie Albert
- Cinematography: Arthur J. Ornitz
- Edited by: Robert Swink
- Music by: Elmer Bernstein
- Production companies: Drexel Films; Millar/Turman Productions
- Distributed by: United Artists
- Release date: August 23, 1961
- Running time: 103 minutes
- Country: United States
- Language: English
- Budget: just over $1 million
- Box office: $1.5 million

The Young Doctors is a 1961 American drama film directed by Phil Karlson and starring Ben Gazzara, Fredric March, Dick Clark, Ina Balin, Eddie Albert, Phyllis Love, Aline MacMahon, George Segal, and Dolph Sweet.

The film is based on the 1959 novel The Final Diagnosis by Arthur Hailey. Ronald Reagan was the narrator in the film.

== Plot ==
David Coleman is a young doctor hired by a hospital's pathology department. The head of the department, Dr. Joseph Pearson, sees Coleman as a rival, and they fight over many medical issues. Coleman falls in love with Cathy Hunt, a student nurse at the hospital, who develops a tumor in her knee. Pearson believes that the tumor is malignant and that the leg should be amputated, but Coleman disagrees. Coleman orders three blood tests on Mrs. Alexander, an expectant mother whose baby may have hemolytic disease, but Pearson believes that the tests are excessive and cancels the third test. Mrs. Alexander is married to a young intern at the hospital, who, along with Coleman, tried to push for the third test. When the baby is born seriously ill, Dr. Charles Dornberger, Mrs. Alexander's OB/GYN, berates Pearson and conducts a blood transfusion to save the baby's life. Pearson's future at the hospital becomes uncertain, and he resigns. Coleman has changed his mind about Cathy's tumor and agrees with Pearson's decision, while Pearson says that Coleman reminds him of himself when he was young and urges him not to let hospital bureaucracy wear him down.

== Cast ==
- Fredric March as Dr. Joseph Pearson
- Ben Gazzara as Dr. David Coleman
- Dick Clark as Dr. Alexander
- Ina Balin as Cathy Hunt
- Eddie Albert as Dr. Charles Dornberger
- Phyllis Love as Mrs. Elizabeth Alexander
- Edward Andrews as Jim Bannister
- Aline MacMahon as Dr. Lucy Grainger
- Arthur Hill as Tomaselli
- Rosemary Murphy as Miss Graves
- Barnard Hughes as Dr. O'Donnell
- George Segal as Dr. Howard
- Dolph Sweet as Police Car Driver

== No Deadly Medicine and The Final Diagnosis ==
Arthur Hailey wrote a two part television play for Studio One called "No Deadly Medicine". It was broadcast in 1957 starring Lee J. Cobb, William Shatner and James Broderick.

Doubleday commissioned Hailey to adapt the script into a novel, The Final Diagnosis, published in 1959. "The quality remains high", wrote The New York Times.

== Production ==
Film rights were bought by Dick Clark, then best known for American Bandstand who took the project to the producing team of Laurence Turman and Steve Tillman (it was their first film together). Finance was obtained from United Artists.

Jeffrey Hunter was sought for the lead. Phil Karlson who had just been fired off The Secret Ways agreed to direct.

Filming started on January 9, 1961. Filming took two months, with studio work at the Production Centre, location work at Poughkeepsie, New York, and exteriors shot at Vassar Brothers Hospital. Many of the cast were taken from the New York stage.

The movie was made with the cooperation and approval of the American Medical Association.
