= Auditions (film) =

1978 film

- Theatrical release poster
- Directed by: Harry Hurwitz
- Written by: Albert Band; Charles Band
- Produced by: Charles Band
- Starring: Bonnie Werchan; Rick Cassidy; Linnea Quigley
- Narrated by: Tony Popson
- Cinematography: R. Michae Stringer
- Edited by: Emil Haviv
- Music by: Richard Band; Joel Goldsmith
- Production company: Charles Band Productions
- Distributed by: Wizard Distributors
- Release date: 1978
- Running time: 82 minutes
- Country: United States
- Language: English

Auditions is a 1978 American erotic mockumentary black comedy film directed by Harry Hurwitz (credited as Harry Tampa). It was written by Albert Band and Charles Band, and stars Bonnie Werchan, Rick Cassidy and Linnea Quigley. Hurwitz also appears in the film as the director, although he is not credited. The film follows the process of casting actors and actresses for a pornographic film. Although several actual porn stars are in the film, it does not depict any actual sexual acts. It was remade in 1999 as Auditions from Beyond.

== Plot ==
During the week of March 15, 1978, an ad appeared in the Hollywood Variety that the producers of films Cinderella (1977) and Fairy Tales (1978) were on the talent search for their new motion picture Fairytales Part II. They were looking for "the world's sexiest woman" for the role of Sleeping Beauty, "the world's sexiest man for the co-starring role of Prince Charming and "the world's most unusual act or personality". Two sets were constructed in a Hollywood studio: a medieval dungeon and a French boudoir. Across from these sets was a mirrored wall behind which cameras and sound equipment was concealed. Hundreds of people responded to the advertisement and on March 25 the two days of auditions began.

== Cast ==
- Bonnie Werchan as Tracy Matthews
- Rick Cassidy as Charlie White
- Linnea Quigley as Sally Webster
- Jennifer West as Melinda Sale
- William Margold as Larry Krantz
- Rhonda Jo Petty as Patty Rhodes
- Cory Brandon as Van Scott
- Greg Travis as Billy Bob Jr.
- Adore O'Hara as Adore O'Hara
- Maria Lutra as Jenny Marino
- Ric Lutze as Ron Wilaon
- Joey Camen as Joey
- Michael Hardin as Vinnie Maluccio
- Harry Hurwitz as Director (uncredited)

== Release ==
=== Home media ===
Auditions were first released on VHS tape in 1978. Full Moon re-released the film on DVD on December 6, 2011, as a part of its "Full Moon's Grindhouse" series of exploitation films.
