= Bertrand Castelli =

French producer, director, painter and writer (1929-2008)

Bertrand Castelli (December 3, 1929, Salon-de-Provence – August 1, 2008) was a French producer, director, lighting designer, choreographer, painter and writer best known as the executive producer of many productions of the rock musical Hair in partnership with the show's main producers Michael Butler and Annie Fargue. Castelli was instrumental in helping the show reach Broadway and would later lead the effort to introduce Hair to a worldwide theatre audience.

Beginning as an innovative lighting designer for ballet and opera, Castelli tried screenwriting, playwriting, choreographing and directing before becoming a producer of Hair in New York and then masterminding its many international productions. In later years, he became the artist in residence of a Mexican resort Belmond Maroma, where he created paintings for every room in the resort.

== Biography ==
Castelli was born in Salon-de-Provence, Bouches-du-Rhône, France, of Corsican heritage. During World War II, he got a job operating the projector at a cinema. Castelli and his friends began to paint and to write and perform plays, operas and ballets to cast aside the gloom of Nazi-occupied Paris. At the age of 17, after the war, he toured Germany operating the lights for a small circus, learning theatre arts and developing innovative lighting techniques.

=== Early career ===
Castelli began his professional artistic career in France working for ballet and opera companies in Paris, starting with lighting design. To finance his ambitions to create a serious ballet, at the age of 21 he first created a short ballet called 'Le colleur d'affiches' in which he costumed dancers as large advertising posters, which came to life advertising each product through a three-minute solo. He boldly pitched the unique concept to large companies such as Perrier, Cartier, Christian Dior and Cointreau. The companies were intrigued and provided financing. He then was able to stage a first-class production of his ballet Les Algues, composed by Guy Bernard, and hired the ballerina Janine Charrat to choreograph and dance the lead role. The ballet earned him considerable success and gave him an "entrée to the society of artists" that, at the time, included Louis-Ferdinand Céline and Jean-Paul Sartre. He traveled in Paris art circles and rubbed elbows with Pablo Picasso, Marcel Marceau and Jean Cocteau. According to his daughter, he once worked as Picasso's assistant, and he was an occasional lover of Françoise Gilot, the mother of two of Picasso's children. For the next few years, he created, produced and directed works for Les Ballets Africaines, Champs Elysees Theatre and the Marquis de Cuevas Ballet Company. Other ballets that he worked on were Face To Face and Green Light, Red Light.

At the age of 24, he moved to New York and then on to Hollywood, where MGM offered him a contract. He wrote numerous plays, including The Umbrella which was produced both on Broadway and in London, The Men's Room and A Frenchman in New York, the last of which was turned into a film. He also wrote screenplays, episodes of television shows including The Millionaire, and a musical comedy together with Ogden Nash and Vernon Duke. He also choreographed striptease vignettes for The Body Shop, the famous club on Sunset Boulevard. In Hollywood, he befriended people like Gene Kelly, Igor Stravinsky, Aldous Huxley, Dorothy Parker and Ray Bradbury. Among other things, he had a role in the 1959 film Thunder in the Sun, a western starring Susan Hayward. In addition to Pandora, who lives in Manhattan, he is survived by another daughter, Josephine, also of Manhattan; a granddaughter; and two stepsons, Michael and Winston Dutton.

=== Hair and later career ===
At the time Hair opened off-Broadway in 1967, Castelli was the director of the Harkness Ballet Company, where he incorporated experimental ideas from Andy Warhol and eventual Hair director Tom O'Horgan. When the Hair team was unable to find a Broadway theater owner that would accept the controversial show, Castelli met with Michael Butler's father Paul and convinced him to use his considerable political clout to make the Biltmore Theater available. Shortly after Hair opened on Broadway in 1968, Butler gave Castelli the job of leading the many foreign language productions of the show. Castelli made the decision to translate Hair into the local language of each country at a time when Broadway shows were always done in English. He produced and sometimes directed companies in France, Germany, Mexico and several other countries, unearthing local and international talent such as Donna Summer and the French singer Julien Clerc.

After Hair, Castelli returned to producing ballet, opera and musical comedy for a decade. In 1972, he wrote and produced Richard, a pre-Watergate lampoon of President Richard M. Nixon, starring John Carradine, Vivian Blaine and Mickey Rooney. He also invented a game similar to table-tennis called Plaff, for which he invented a paddle with two parallel surfaces connected by a hand grip. He and Lorees Yerby, who was a co-director of Richard, were married for 15 years. They had four daughters: Delphina, Aurora, Pandora and Josephine.

During the last 15 years of his life, Castelli lived mostly in the Yucatán, Mexico, where he was artist in residence at the Maroma Resort and Spa in Riviera Maya, not far from Cancún. He spent his retirement writing and painting abstract, Spanish-influenced, colorful artworks whose subject was often dancers and human movement, surrounded in retirement by his artistic young friends. He created a painting for every room in the resort. The New York Times described him as "a friend of the famous and not-so-famous, a cultivator of people, an avid pot smoker and devoted sensualist". His friend Michael Butler described him as a "crazy showman... the guy with the business suit and beads".

Castelli died at the age of 78 in a hospital near the resort after being hit by a speedboat during his daily swim.
