= Chuck McCann =

American actor (1934–2018)

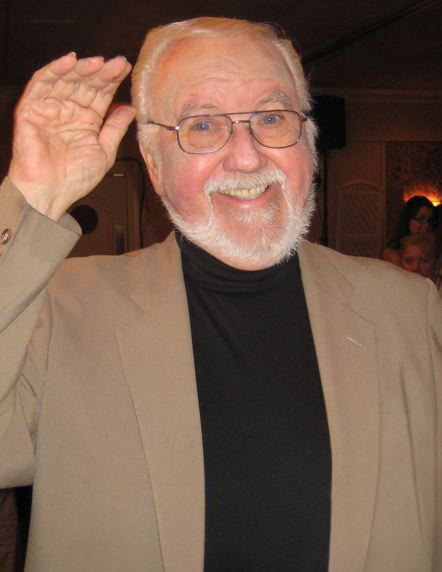
- Born: Charles John Thomas McCann; September 2, 1934; Brooklyn, New York, U.S.
- Died: April 8, 2018 (aged 83); Los Angeles, California, U.S.
- Resting place: Forest Lawn Memorial Park
- Occupations: Actor; comedian; puppeteer; commercial presenter; television host
- Years active: 1944–2017
- Spouse: Betty Fanning (m. 1977)
- Children: 3

Charles John Thomas McCann (September 2, 1934 – April 8, 2018) was an American actor, comedian, puppeteer, commercial presenter and television host. His career spanned over 70 years. He was best known for his work in presenting children's television programming and animation, as well as his own program, The Chuck McCann Show, and he also recorded comedy parody-style albums.

== Career ==
=== Early life and career ===
McCann was born in Brooklyn, New York, to Valentine J. McCann (whose father had performed in Buffalo Bill’s Wild West) and the former Viola Hennessy. McCann started doing radio voiceovers at the age of six. By the time he was 12 years old, he founded a fan club for Laurel and Hardy and did impressions of Oliver Hardy. He worked his way up to regional star status by apprenticing on a number of children's shows, such as Captain Kangaroo. McCann got his big break performing on The Sandy Becker Show on WABD after the original host vacationed to South America. The best-selling The First Family, an early 1960s LP record album which lampooned the newly elected United States President John F. Kennedy and his family, included McCann among its voices.

=== Variety shows and voice work ===
Until 1975, McCann hosted comedy/variety TV puppet shows in the New York area with Paul Ashley, featuring the Paul Ashley Puppets. Together, they did The Puppet Hotel for WNTA-TV, Channel 13; then Laurel & Hardy & Chuck, Let's Have Fun, and The Chuck McCann Show for WPIX, Channel 11; and finally, The Chuck McCann Show, The Great Bombo's Magic Cartoon Circus Lunchtime Show, and Chuck McCann's Laurel and Hardy Show for WNEW-TV, Channel 5. In addition, Chuck was the comedy sidekick on WPIX's long-running rock music showcase, The Clay Cole Show. During this time, McCann appeared at many New York area venues, including Palisades Amusement Park and Freedomland U.S.A., to meet and entertain children. At Freedomland, McCann hosted a yo-yo contest, filmed several Halloween specials, filmed a WPIX Freedomland special with other children's show hosts and appeared with Clay Cole at the park's Moon Bowl entertainment venue that featured celebrity singers and other performers. McCann's ties to Freedomland are featured in the book Freedomland U.S.A.: The Definitive History (Theme Park Press, 2019).

By the end of the 1960s, he had appeared in the 1968 film The Heart Is a Lonely Hunter and performed regularly on CBS's The Garry Moore Show.

He began an animation acting career, doing everything from Bob Kane's Cool McCool to Sonny the Cuckoo Bird in commercials for General Mills. He had even been one of the stars of Turn-On, producer George Schlatter's offshoot of Laugh-In.

=== 1970s television ===
In the 1970s, McCann's life and career shifted west, and he relocated to Los Angeles. He made frequent guest appearances on network television shows including Little House on the Prairie, Bonanza, Columbo, The Rockford Files and The Bob Newhart Show. He appeared in the 1973 television film The Girl Most Likely to... and was a regular on Norman Lear's All That Glitters.

In addition, he co-starred with Bob Denver in CBS's Saturday-morning sitcom Far Out Space Nuts, which he co-created. The 1970s also brought him fame in a long-running series of commercials for Right Guard antiperspirant: he was the enthusiastic neighbor with the catch phrase "Hi, guy!" who appeared on the other side of a shared medicine cabinet, opposite actor Bill Fiore.

McCann appeared as Wally Stone in the Starsky & Hutch season 2 episode "Murder on Stage 17", in which he played an ex-comedian turned murderer. In this episode, McCann's talent as an actor was spotlighted, and he was able to portray various characters throughout the episode.

McCann impersonated Oliver Hardy in commercials for various products (teaming with Jim MacGeorge as Stan Laurel), and for a few years, he played the holiday-season recurring role of Kris Kringle on the NBC soap opera Santa Barbara. In 1965, he and John McCabe were two of the five founding members of the now worldwide society of The Sons of the Desert, an appreciation club for the works of Laurel and Hardy. He had a role in Kojak in 1974.

=== Film ===
After The Heart Is a Lonely Hunter, McCann's motion picture career took a turn back into comedy with many supporting roles and a co-starring turn (with Tim Conway) in They Went That-A-Way & That-A-Way (1978).

His most notable post-Hunter films were The Projectionist (1971), Jennifer on My Mind (1971), Linda Lovelace for President (1975), Foul Play (1978), C.H.O.M.P.S. (1979), The Comeback Trail (1982), Hamburger: The Motion Picture (1986), Thrashin' (1986) and Herbie Rides Again (1974), where he played Loostgarten, president of Loostgarten Wrecking Company.

McCann had a supporting role in the 1988 horror film Cameron's Closet as well as minor roles in the Mel Brooks films Robin Hood: Men in Tights (1993) and Dracula: Dead and Loving It (1995).

=== Return to roots ===
In 1980, McCann and Paul Ashley were reunited for a pair of TV show pilots: Tiny TV, a satirical/variety puppet series aimed at adults for the cable market, and LBS Children's Theater, a children's film anthology show where McCann and the Paul Ashley Puppets were to introduce reruns of primetime animated TV specials and theatrical cartoons from Europe. However, Paul Ashley was forced to leave the projects when he proved to be suffering from Alzheimer's disease. Tiny TV never reached fruition, but LBS Children's Theater was picked up for national syndication in 1983. McCann emceed the series alone because Ashley did not live long enough to see the show, having died on September 3, 1984.

In the 1980s, McCann reprised a number of his best sketches from his New York television days as interstitial material for a two-hour presentation of cartoons on KCOP-TV, Channel 13 in Los Angeles, assisted by Bob Ridgely. McCann also voiced characters for various projects by The Walt Disney Company, such as Dreamfinder in the theme park attraction Journey Into Imagination, and several characters including Duckworth, Burger Beagle and Bouncer Beagle in the 1987 animated series DuckTales.

In 1989, McCann returned to daily children's television one more time with Chuck McCann's Funstuff, produced by fellow New York kid show legend Sonny Fox. Chuck McCann's Funstuff was seen weekday mornings on KHJ-TV from Monday, September 18, 1989, until Friday, October 13, 1989.

=== 1990s ===
In the 1990s, McCann co-founded and participated in Yarmy's Army, a group of comedians and character actors of his generation who gathered regularly to cheer up Don Adams' brother Dick Yarmy, who was dying of cancer. A group with a massive array of comic talent, its members included Harvey Korman, Shelley Berman, Tim Conway, and many others.

After Yarmy's death, the group stayed together to cheer themselves up since increasing age and health problems made it increasingly more difficult for them to get steady work. In addition to having monthly dinners, they performed in various group-directed shows in select venues around the country.

McCann continued voice work for cartoons, playing Jollo, Bookworm, Bump-On-A-Log, and Woof in 1992's King's Quest VI: Heir Today, Gone Tomorrow. One of his best-known voiceover roles was The Thing in the Fantastic Four and Hulk animated series, as well as the villain Blizzard in Iron Man.

He also played Heff Heffalump in Disney's The New Adventures of Winnie The Pooh. He was also the voice of Leatherneck on the second season of G.I. Joe. Throughout the 1990s and into the new millennium, he has been in commercials at Christmas time, he has played Santa Claus for one product or another—and TV/film gigs (Sabrina, the Teenage Witch).

=== 2000s–2010s ===
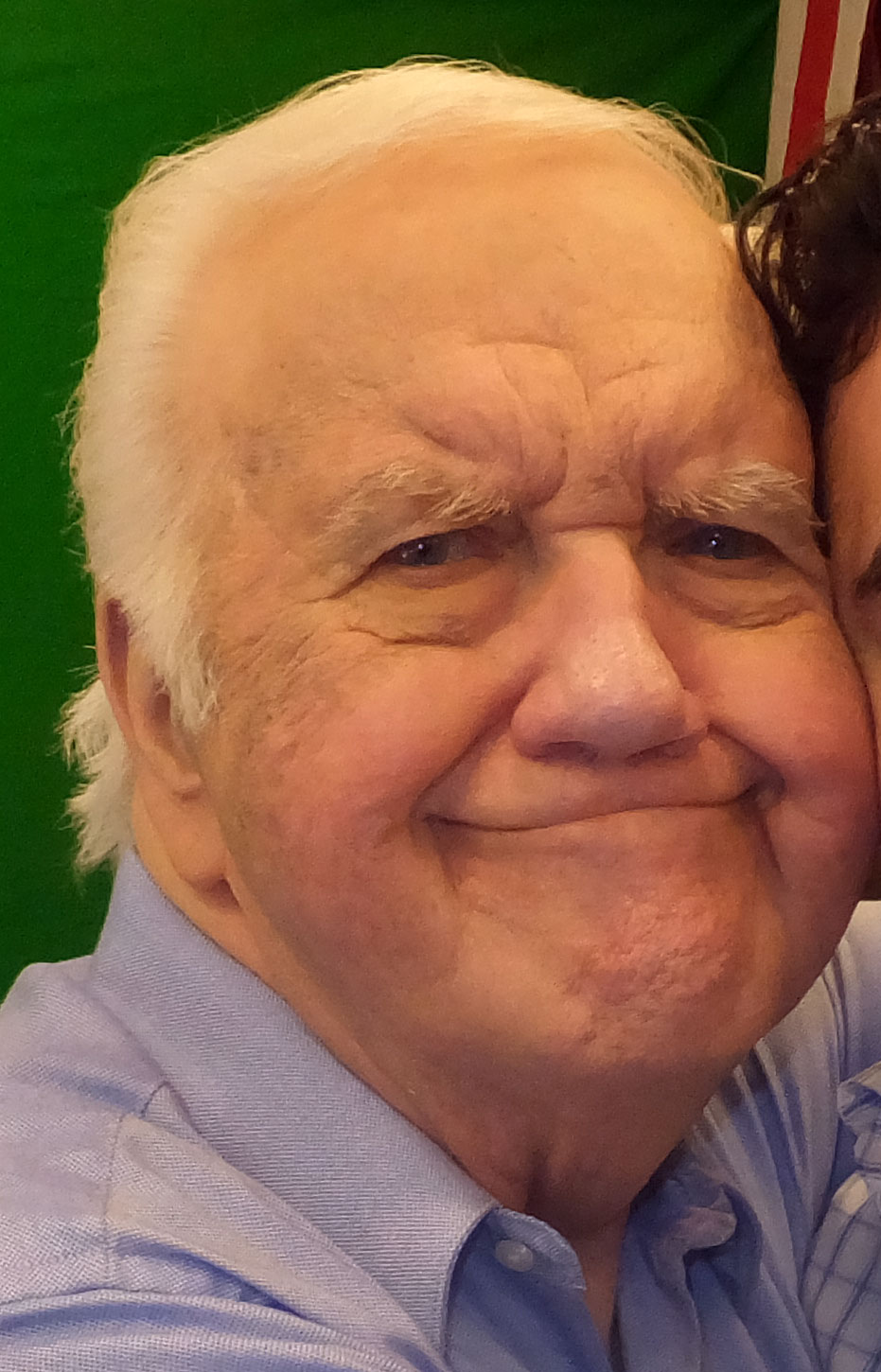
McCann in October 2013

In the 2000s, McCann appeared in They Call Him Sasquatch (2003) and Dorf da Bingo King (with his old pal, Tim Conway). He supplied voices for The Powerpuff Girls and Mickey's Twice Upon a Christmas. He moved into the field of video games, providing voices for True Crime: New York City. He made an appearance in The Aristocrats (2005), with an animated rendition of a "clean" version of the "dirty" joke that serves as the film's subject.

In 2006–07 he made appearances on The Radio Adventures of Dr. Floyd as Benjamin Franklin and Dr. Floyd's father. He has also made multiple appearances as a judge on Boston Legal, including the two-hour series finale in December 2008. In 2007, McCann played the villain Dalton Kern on the radio drama Adventures in Odyssey and also Navarro and Buck in Random! Cartoons.

In 2013, McCann voiced Moseph "Moe" Mastro Giovanni on an episode of Adventure Time, Mayor Grafton on The Garfield Show, and reprised Duckworth, Bouncer Beagle and Burger Beagle in DuckTales Remastered. In 2016, he reprised the role of the Amoeba Boys in the 2016 reboot of The Powerpuff Girls. In 2017, McCann recorded a comedy podcast program, "Trump: The Last Family" with Kevin Sean Michaels, a modern send-up to the best-selling The First Family LP of the 1960s.

== Personal life ==
McCann married Suzanne Conner in 1958 and had a son. They divorced in 1966 and he later married model Eileen Somerstrad and had 2 daughters. They divorced in 1977 and he married his agent Betty Fanning, whom he remained married to until his death. He was a close friend of Hugh Hefner and a regular at the Playboy Mansion.

== Death ==
McCann died on April 8, 2018, of congestive heart failure, at Cedars-Sinai Medical Center in Los Angeles. He was cremated and his remains are in Forest Lawn Memorial Park.

He is survived by his third wife, Betty; and by two daughters from his second marriage. His son from his first marriage, Sean, died in 2009.

== Selected filmography ==
=== Film ===
List of live-action performances in film
Year	Title	Role	Note
1968	The Heart Is a Lonely Hunter	Spiros Antonapoulos	
1970	The Projectionist	Chuck McCann, the projectionist, Captain Flash	
1972	Play It as It Lays	Abortionist's Assistant	
1973	The Girl Most Likely To...	Coach	
1974	Herbie Rides Again	Loostgarten	
1975	Linda Lovelace for President	The Assassinator	Credited as Alfredo Fetchuttini
1976	Silent Movie	Studio Gate Guard	
1976	How to Break Up a Happy Divorce	Man with hangover	
1978	Foul Play	Nuart Theatre manager	
1978	They Went That-A-Way & That-A-Way	Wallace	
1983	Likely Stories, Vol. 3	Ralph Warner	
1986	Hamburger: The Motion Picture	Dr. Mole	
1986	Thrashin'	Sam Flood	
1988	Cameron's Closet	Ben Majors	
1989	That's Adequate	Lowell Westbrook	Mockumentary
1990	Guns	Abe	
1992	Ladybugs	Bartender	
1992	Storyville	Pudge Herman	
1993	Robin Hood: Men in Tights	Villager	
1995	Dracula: Dead and Loving It	Innkeeper	
2003	They Call Him Sasquatch	Bob Mabely	Direct-to-video
2009	Citizen Jane	Judge Thomas	Television film
2011	Night Club	Manny Melowitz	
2013	I Know That Voice	Himself	Documentary film

List of voice performances in film
Year	Title	Role	Notes
1968	The World of Hans Christian Andersen	Uncle Oley	
1986	G.I. Joe: Arise, Serpentor, Arise!	Leatherneck	Television film
1987	G.I. Joe: The Movie	Leatherneck	Direct-to-video
1990	DuckTales the Movie: Treasure of the Lost Lamp	Duckworth	
2004	Mickey's Twice Upon a Christmas	Santa Claus	Direct-to-video

=== Television ===
List of live-action performances in television
Year	Title	Role	Notes
1969	Turn-On	Regular Performer	
1972	Bonanza	Lonnie Younger	Episode "The Younger Brothers' Younger Brother"
1973	Columbo	Roger White	Episode "Double Exposure"
1973	The Bob Newhart Show	Hal Miller	Episode "Let's Get Away From It Almost"
1974	Kojak	Lloyd Tatum	Episode "Eighteen Hours of Fear"
1974	Little House on the Prairie	Tinker Jones	Episode "The Voice of Tinker Jones"
1974–1976	Police Woman	Harold Miller, Marty Madison	Episode "Seven Eleven" (Credited as Chuck Mc Cann); Episode "Broken Angels"
1975	Far Out Space Nuts	Barney	15 episodes
1976–1977	Starsky and Hutch	Larry Hovath; Wally Stone	Episode "Silence"; Episode "Murder at Stage 17"
1977	All That Glitters	Bert Stockwood	21 episodes
1977	The Rockford Files	Kenny Bell	Episode "Requiem for a Funny Box"
1977	Switch	Pendergast	Episode "Legend of the Macunas Parts 1&2"
1981–1982	One Day at a Time	Beerbelly	3 episodes
1981	CHiPs	Gillis	Episode "Fast Money"
1982	The Greatest American Hero	Captain Bellybuster	Episode "Captain Bellybuster and the Speed Factory"
1983–1985	Matt Houston	Oliver Hardy, Adam Booth	Episode "Here's Another Fine Mess"; Episode "Final Vows"
1985	Knight Rider	Bombo The Clown	Episode "Circus Knights"
1985	Tales from the Darkside	Spiffy Remo	Episode "The Impressionist"
1987–1988	Santa Barbara	Kris Kringle	7 episodes
1992	On the Air	Wally Walters/Mr. Peanuts	Episode 5
1997	Invasion	Chairman of Health Committee	2 episodes
1997	Sabrina the Teenage Witch	The Repairman	Episode "Jenny's Non-Dream"
2007–2008	Boston Legal	Judge Byron Fudd	6 episodes

List of voice performances in television
Year	Title	Role	Notes
1966	Cool McCool	Number One, The Owl, Tom McCool	3 episodes
1977	CB Bears	Boogie, Blubber	13 episodes
1979	Fred and Barney Meet the Shmoo	Billy Joe	
1979	Scooby-Doo and Scrappy-Doo	Additional voices	16 episodes
1979	The Plastic Man Comedy/Adventure Show	Badladdin	
1980	Captain Caveman and the Teen Angels	Additional voices	Episode "Cavey and the Volcanic Villain"
1980	Drak Pack	Mummy Man	7 episodes
1981	Super Friends	Colossus	Episode "Colossus"
1981	Thundarr the Barbarian	Artemus, Mutants	Episode "Trial by Terror"
1981	Space Stars	Additional voices	11 episodes
1982	Richie Rich	Additional voices	Episode "Dollar's Exercise, Richie's Cube, The Maltese Monkey, Everybody's Doing It"
1982–1983	Pac-Man	Blinky and Pinky	19 episodes
1984	The Get Along Gang	Sammy Skunk, Bus Driver, Mule Warehouse Worker, Fruit Vendor, Diner Cook	5 episodes
1985	Snorks	Additional voices	Episode "Snorkitis Is Nothing to Sneeze At, The Whole Toot and Nothing But..."
1985	The Jetsons	Additional voices	Episode "Elroy in Wonderland"
1985–1986	Galtar and the Golden Lance	Orloc	21 episodes
1986	G.I. Joe: A Real American Hero	Leatherneck	16 episodes
1986	Pound Puppies	Biff Barker	Episode "Ghost Hounders"
1987–1990	DuckTales	Duckworth, Burger Beagle, Bouncer Beagle, Additional voices	57 episodes
1987–1991	Disney's Adventures of the Gummi Bears	Sir Gaya, Knight, Chef, Tadpole	3 episodes
1988	A Pup Named Scooby-Doo	Cashmore, Additional voices	Episode "The Schnook Who Took My Comic Book"
1988–1989	Fantastic Max	Additional voices	3 episodes
1988–1990	The New Adventures of Winnie the Pooh	Heff Heffalump	2 episodes
1988–1991	Garfield and Friends	Uncle Ed, Dog	2 episodes
1989	The Smurfs	Additional voices	Episode "Smurfs That Time Forgot: Part 1, Smurfs That Time Forgot: Part 2"
1989	Ring Raiders	Baron Von Clawdeitz	5 episodes
1990	Chip 'n Dale: Rescue Rangers	Sugar Ray Lizard	2 episodes
1990–1991	TaleSpin	Dumptruck, Gibber, Sadie, Rhino Goon	16 episodes
1991	Attack of the Killer Tomatoes	Beefsteak	5 episodes
1991	Where's Wally?: The Animated Series	Additional voices	13 episodes
1991	Toxic Crusaders	Mayor Grody	13 episodes
1991–1992	Tom & Jerry Kids	Fido, Cheezy	3 episodes
1993	Droopy, Master Detective	King of the Sea, Baby Bandit's Henchman	2 episodes
1993	All-New Dennis the Menace	Additional voices	13 episodes
1993	Bonkers	Ape	Episode "Frame That Toon"
1993	Animaniacs	Codger Eggbert	Episode: "Critical Condition"
1993	ABC Weekend Special	Santa Claus	Episode "P.J.'s Unfunnybunny Christmas"
1994–1995	Fantastic Four	Thing	26 episodes
1994–1996	Iron Man	Blizzard	10 episodes
1995	The Twisted Tales of Felix the Cat	Voices, Worm 2, Talents of Trial	2 episodes
1996	What a Cartoon!	Amoeba Boys	Episode "The Powerpuff Girls: Crime 101"
1996	Duckman	Additional voices	Episode "Pig Amok"
1996	The Tick	Filth #2	Episode "The Tick vs. Filth"
1996	The Incredible Hulk	Thing	Episode "Fantastic Fortitude"
1998	Bug City	Bugsy Seagull	13 episodes
1998–2003	The Powerpuff Girls	Amoeba Boys	5 episodes
1999	The New Woody Woodpecker Show	Santa Claus	Episode "A Very Woody Christmas, It's a Chilly Christmas After All, Yule Get Yours"
2008–2013	The Garfield Show	Additional voices	5 episodes
2009	Random! Cartoons	Navarro, Buck	2 episodes
2013–2015	Adventure Time	Moe	3 episodes
2016	The Powerpuff Girls	Amoeba Boys	Episode "Viral Spiral"

=== Video games ===
Year	Title	Role	Notes
1992	King's Quest VI	Jollo, Bookworm, Bump-on-a-Log, Woof	
2005	True Crime: New York City		
2006	Heroes of Might and Magic V	Tribes of the East DLC	
2006	Gothic 3	Additional voices	English dub
2007	Spider-Man 3	Additional voices	
2013	DuckTales: Remastered	Duckworth, Burger Beagle, Bouncer Beagle	
