= Chaplinesque, My Life and Hard Times =

1972 documentary film

- Directed by: Harry Hurwitz
- Written by: Harry Hurwitz
- Produced by: Harry Hurwitz
- Starring: Charlie Chaplin
- Narrated by: Gloria Swanson
- Music by: Stuart Oderman
- Distributed by: Xanadu Productions Inc.
- Release date: April 12, 1972
- Running time: 56 minutes
- Country: United States
- Language: English

Chaplinesque, My Life and Hard Times, a.k.a. The Eternal Tramp (video title), is a 1972 documentary film directed by Harry Hurwitz.

== Plot ==
The documentary examines the early life and career of Charlie Chaplin, with narration by Gloria Swanson.
