= Double-talk =

Adding invented words into normal speech

Double-talk is a form of speech in which inappropriate, invented, or nonsense words are interpolated into normal speech to give the appearance of knowledge, and thus confuse or amuse the audience.

== Examples ==
Comedians who have used this as part of their act include Al Kelly, Danny Kaye, Gary Owens, Irwin Corey, Jackie Gleason, Jerry Lewis, Sid Caesar, Stanley Unwin, Reggie Watts, and Vanessa Bayer. For example, in his talk on music, "Populode of the Musicolly", Stanley Unwin says:

They do in fact go back to Ethelrebbers Unready, King Albert's burnt capers where, you know, the toast fell in and the dear lady did get a very cross knit and smote him across the eardrome excallybold. The great sword which riseyhuff and Merlin forevermore was the beginning of the Great Constitution of the Englishspeaking peeploders of these islone, oh yes.

It has also been used in films, for example Charlie Chaplin's character in The Great Dictator, many of Danny Kaye's patter songs, and Willie Solar's screeching singing in Diamond Horseshoe (1945).

== See also ==
- Bloviation
- Gibberish and gobbledygook
- Jabberwocky
- Doublethink
- Doublespeak
- Prisencolinensinainciusol
- Supercalifragilisticexpialidocious
- Technobabble
