= Paul Ford =

American character actor (1901–1976)

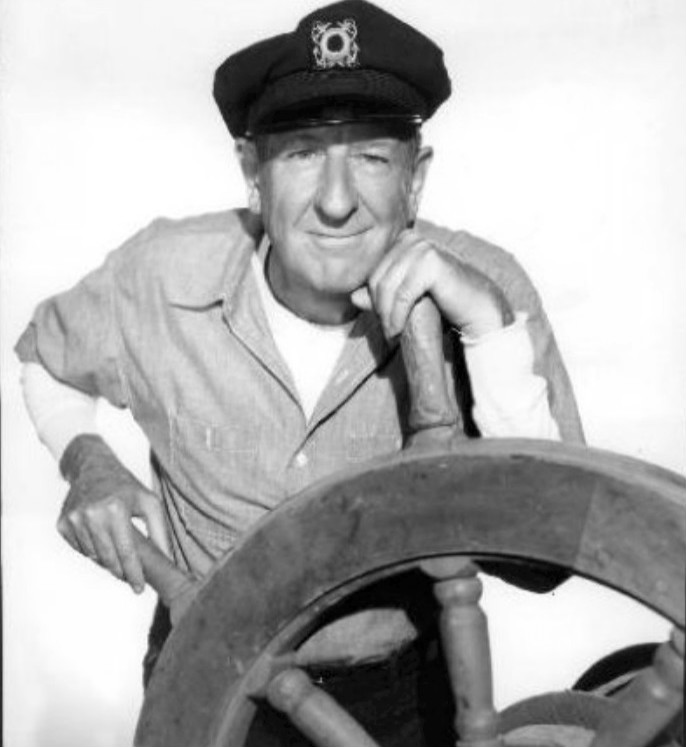
- Ford as Sam Bailey in The Baileys of Balboa (1964)
- Born: Paul Ford Weaver; November 2, 1901; Baltimore, Maryland, U.S.
- Died: April 12, 1976 (aged 74); Mineola, New York, U.S.
- Occupation: Actor
- Years active: 1945–1972
- Spouse: Nell Weaver
- Children: 4

Paul Ford Weaver (November 2, 1901 – April 12, 1976) was an American character actor and comedic actor who came to specialize in portraying authority figures whose ineptitude and pompous demeanor were played for comic effect, notably as Mayor George Shinn in the 1957 Broadway musical comedy The Music Man, followed five years later by repeating the role in The Music Man, (starring Robert Preston and Shirley Jones), and on television as U.S. Army Colonel John T. Hall on several seasons of the military comedy The Phil Silvers Show (1955–1959).

== Early years ==
Ford was born Paul Ford Weaver in Baltimore, Maryland. His father was described as "a well-to-do businessman" who lost his fortune when his investment in a soft-drink company failed.

At an early age, he showed an adept talent for performance, but was discouraged when directors thought he was tone-deaf.

After attending Dartmouth College for one year, Ford was a salesman before he became an entertainer.

He took his middle birth name, which was his mother's maiden name, as his stage last name. The change occurred after he failed an audition as Paul Weaver, but was successful when he auditioned again as Paul Ford.

== Career ==
In later years, Ford made his distinctive voice one of the most recognized on films and television of his era. His later success, however, was long in the making, and he did little acting in his early adult years but instead raised his family during the Great Depression of the 1930s.

32nd President Franklin Delano Roosevelt's New Deal programs during the Great Depression of the 1930s, including the Public Works Administration (PWA) and Works Progress Administration (WPA) programs, provided Ford, then in his early 30s, with work and experience plus his first contact with acting and entertainment. Because of this, to the day he died, Ford was a political / social Liberal and Progressive, becoming a "FDR Democrat" for the rest of his life.

He first ventured into entertainment in a puppet theater project sponsored by the New Deal program in the Works Progress Administration (WPA) to combat the Great Depression providing employment in the Federal Theatre Project for authors, academics, actors and musicians during Roosevelt's administration. Years later in 1958 after he became nationally known on TV, he said of that opportunity: "I got on the puppet project of the WPA and helped write and put on shows for the Federal Theater. We did puppet shows at the New York World's Fair in 1939 to 1940, and I served as narrator, a kind of 'Hoosier' cornball in beard."

Following his experience with puppets, Ford briefly worked as an attendant at a gas station before turning to acting for a better career. His first professional acting job was in an Off-Broadway production in New York City in 1939.

In 1955, Ford played the bank president in the National Broadcasting Company ( NBC) television comedy series Norby. He became an "overnight" success a year later at age 54 when he played "Colonel John T. Hall", U.S. Army incompetent commanding officer opposite comedian Phil Silvers on Silvers' military comedic The Phil Silvers Show TV show (often known as "Sergeant Bilko" or just "Bilko" for its main character and longtime film and now TV star).

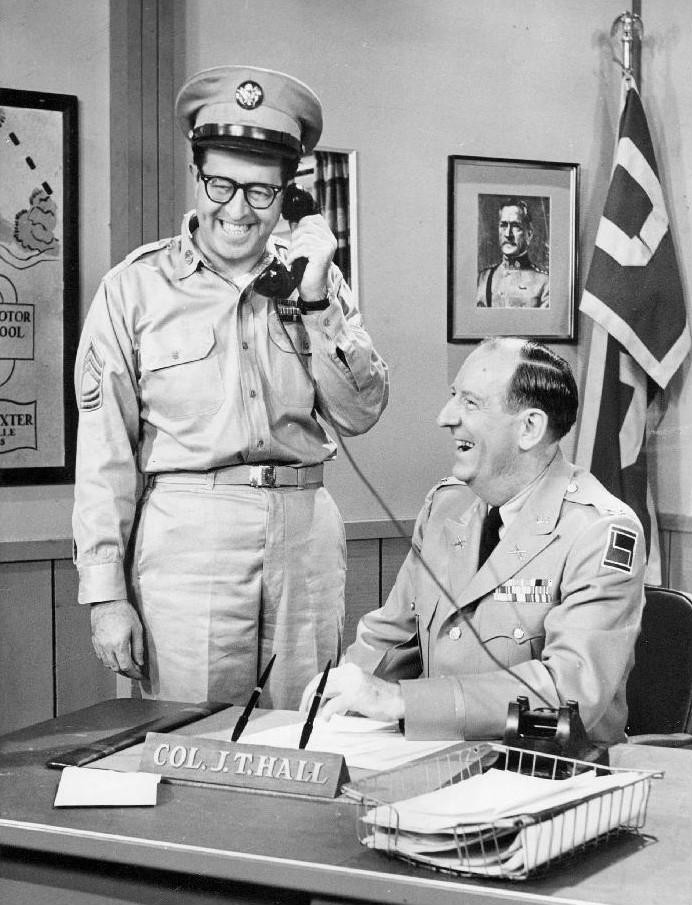
"Sgt. Bilko" (Phil Silvers) standing at left with "Col. John T. Hall" (Paul Ford, at age 54) at desk on 'The Phil Silvers Show' on CBS-TV network, 1955–1959.

His signature role may well be the part of "Mayor George Shinn" of River City, Iowa (a fictional small rural town in the 1910s era), as a befuddled politico in the 1962 film musical comedy adaptation of the earlier 1957 Broadway / New York City stage show The Music Man. Ford played the role straight but still comedic and received glowing reviews. The other role he is most identified with is that of "Horace Vandergelder" opposite Shirley Booth in the 1958 screen version of The Matchmaker, plus as "Kendall Hawkins", in the Cold War-era comedy The Russians Are Coming! The Russians Are Coming! (1966), as an old Army officer with delusions of grandeur (who still carries his sword) leading his New England Gloucester island rural militia and a mob of panicked villagers against a possible Russian invasion when a Soviet Red Navy submarine accidentally runs aground offshore. The film also starred Brian Keith, Carl Reiner, Eva Marie Saint, Jonathan Winters, Alan Arkin, and Theodore Bikel.

Ford had an active career on stage, then films and television, until his retirement in the early 1970s. Despite being a respected earlier Broadway theatre stage character actor in the 1940s and early 1950s, Ford was notorious for being unable to remember his lines. This would cause occasional difficulty forcing him and those around him to improvise, often with hilarious effects. This became especially notable on The Phil Silvers Show in the late 1950s.

He appeared in the 1962–1963 season in the Columbia Broadcasting System (CBS) television anthology The Lloyd Bridges Show. A year later, he also starred in The Baileys of Balboa also on CBS-TV network which lasted only one season (1964–1965).

His earlier stage credits include Another Part of the Forest (1946), Command Decision (1947), The Teahouse of the August Moon (1953), Whoop-Up (1958), replacing David Burns as Mayor George Shinn of River City, Iowa in The Music Man (1957) and repeated the role five years later in the 1962 musical film, A Thurber Carnival (1960), Never Too Late (1962), 3 Bags Full (1966), and What Did We Do Wrong? (1967).

Most actors who worked with Ford claimed he was a kindly and very funny man. He was known for his descriptive quotes about life in the Great Depression in later years, including, "My kids used to think everyone lived on peanut butter sandwiches!!"

His final role was three and half years prior to his death as a Washington, D.C. doctor in the film Richard in 1972.

== Death ==
On April 12, 1976, Ford died of a heart attack at Nassau Hospital in Mineola, on Long Island, New York. He was age 74. He was buried in Holy Cross Cemetery, Culver City, Los Angeles, California. He was survived by his wife Nell Weaver, and four children – two daughters, and two sons.

== Recognition ==
Ford was nominated for three Primetime Emmy Awards: Best Supporting Performance by an Actor (1957), Best Continuing Supporting Performance by an Actor in a Dramatic or Comedy Series (1958) and Outstanding Performance in a Supporting Role by an Actor (1963). The first two were for his work on The Phil Silvers Show; the third was for a role on the Hallmark Hall of Fame.

Ford was nominated in 1963 for a "Tony" Award for Best Performance by a Leading Actor in a Play for Never Too Late.

Ford's April 1976's detailed obituary in The New York Times noted: "In 1967 Mr. Ford was cited by the National Board of Review of Motion Pictures as the best supporting actor for his role in The Comedians."

== Partial filmography ==
- The House on 92nd Street (1945) as Police Sergeant (uncredited)
- The Front Page (TV Movie 1945)
- The Naked City (1948) as Henry Fowler (uncredited)
- Lust for Gold (1949) as Sheriff Lynn Early
- All the King's Men (1949) as Leader of the Opposition in the State Senate (uncredited)
- The Kid from Texas (1950) as Sheriff Copeland
- Perfect Strangers (1950) as Judge James Byron
- The Teahouse of the August Moon (1956) as Colonel Wainwright Purdy III
- The Missouri Traveler (1958) as Finas Daugherty
- The Matchmaker (1958) as Horace Vandergelder
- Keep in Step (TV Movie 1959) as Colonel John T. Hall
- The Right Man (TV Movie 1960) as Perfect Candidate
- Alfred Hitchcock Presents (1961) (Season 7 Episode 1: "The Hatbox") as Professor Jarvis
- Advise and Consent (1962) as Senator Stanley Danta
- The Teahouse of the August Moon (TV Movie 1962) as Colonel Wainwright Purdy III
- The Music Man (1962) as Mayor George Shinn
- Who's Got the Action? (1962) as Judge Boatwright
- It's a Mad, Mad, Mad, Mad World (1963) as Colonel Wilberforce
- Never Too Late (1965) as Harry M. Lambert
- The Russians Are Coming, the Russians Are Coming (1966) as Fendall Hawkins
- A Big Hand for the Little Lady (1966) as C.P. Ballinger
- The Spy with a Cold Nose (1966) as American General
- The Comedians (1967) as Smith
- In Name Only (1969) as Elwy Pertwhistle
- Twinky aka Lola (1969) as Mr. Wardman, Scott's Father
- Fair Play (1972) as F. O. McGill
- Richard (1972) (political spoof humorous film about 37th President Richard M. Nixon before Watergate scandal) as a Washington, D.C. Doctor
- Journey Back to Oz (1974) as Uncle Henry (voice) (voice recorded in 1962)
