= The Lonely Profession =

1969 American crime drama television film

- Written by: Douglas Heyes
- Directed by: Douglas Heyes
- Starring: Harry Guardino
- Music by: Pete Rugolo
- Country of origin: United States
- Original language: English

Production
- Producer: Jo Swerling Jr.
- Cinematography: Ralph Woolsey
- Editor: Robert Watts
- Running time: 100 minutes
- Production company: Universal Television

Original release
- Release: October 21, 1969

The Lonely Profession, also known as The Savarona Syndrome, is a 1969 American television film directed and written by Douglas Heyes, based on his 1963 novel The Twelfth of Never. It stars Harry Guardino as Lee Gordon, a private investigator who seeks the killer of a tycoon's mistress and becomes a suspect.

== Plot ==
Private investigator Leo Gordon is hired to trail Karen Mendaros, the mistress of a reclusive billionaire. When they meet, Gordon and Mendaros hit it off and check in at a motel. Gordon wakes up the next morning and discovers that Mendaros had been murdered during the night. Gordon opens his own investigation of Mendaros' past in an attempt to determine who killed Mendaros and why he has been set up as the fall guy.

== Main cast ==
Actor	Role
Harry Guardino	Lee Gordon
Dean Jagger	Charles Van Cleve
Barbara McNair	Donna Travers
Fernando Lamas	Dominic Savarona
Joseph Cotten	Martin Bannister
Jack Carter	Freddie Farber
Ina Balin	Karen Menardos
Dina Merrill	Beatrice Savarona
Troy Donahue	Julian Thatcher
