= The Baileys of Balboa =

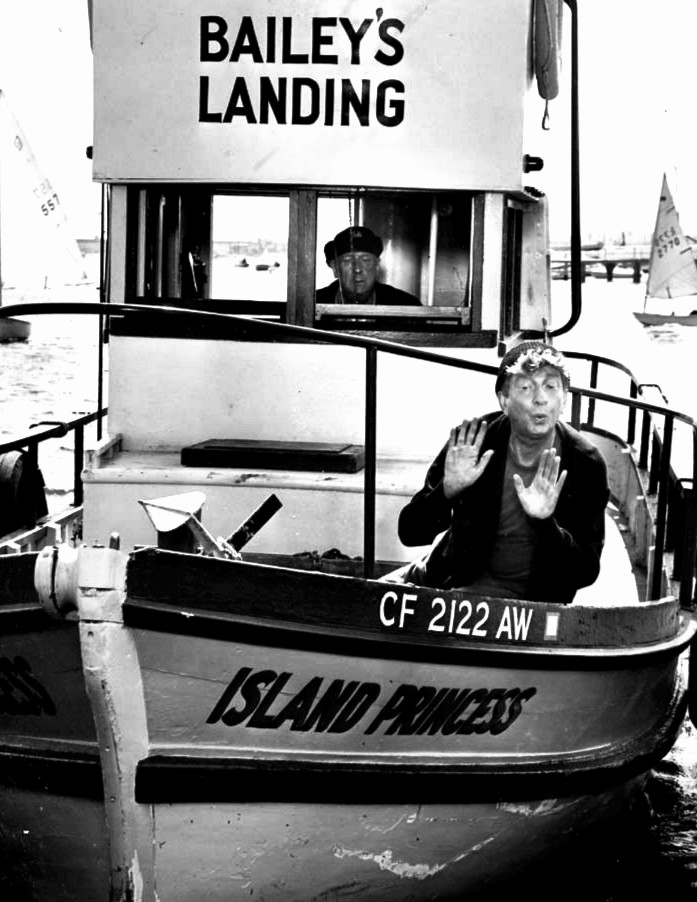
- Paul Ford (background) and Sterling Holloway (foreground), 1964
- Genre: Sitcom
- Directed by: Gary Nelson; Bob Sweeney
- Starring: Paul Ford; Sterling Holloway; Judy Carne; John Dehner; Howard Freeman; Dorothy Green; Clint Howard; Les Brown, Jr.
- Theme music composer: Harry Geller
- Composer: Harry Geller (all episodes)
- Country of origin: United States
- Original language: English
- No. of seasons: 1
- No. of episodes: 26

Production
- Executive producer: Keefe Brasselle
- Producer: Bob Sweeney
- Running time: 30 mins.
- Production companies: Richelieu Productions; Antelo Productions; Grandandy Productions; CBS Television Network

Original release
- Network: CBS
- Release: September 24, 1964 – April 1, 1965

The Baileys of Balboa is an American sitcom that appeared on CBS in the 1964–1965 season on Thursdays at 9:30pm ET. Many episodes were directed by Gary Nelson and Bob Sweeney. The series was broadcast from September 24, 1964, to April 1, 1965.

The series was developed due to network president, James T. Aubrey, believing that Gilligan's Island, which premiered the same season, should be about a charter boat captain operating in a marina. The Baileys of Balboa was produced by Richelieu Productions, owned by Keefe Brasselle, a friend of Aubrey.

== Overview ==
Sam Bailey is a laid-back widower who operates a charter boat, The Island Princess. Sam lives with his son, Jim, on a tiny island he owns, which happens to be in the middle of Balboa, a California yachting community. Jim Bailey is in love with Barbara, the daughter of Commodore Wyntoon, and the romance is the only reason Sam and the Commodore are somewhat civil to each other. Buck Singleton is first-mate (and entire crew) of The Island Princess, and Stanley is an annoying boy who lives nearby.

== Cast ==
- Paul Ford as Sam Bailey
- Sterling Holloway as Buck Singleton
- Les Brown, Jr. as Jim Bailey
- Clint Howard as Stanley
- John Dehner as Commodore Cecil Wyntoon
- Judy Carne as Barbara Wyntoon

== Episodes ==
No.	Title	Directed by	Written by	Original release date
1	"Love is a White Sea Bass"	Bob Sweeney	Richard Powell	September 24, 1964
Sam's relentless efforts to learn the secret formula which five-year-old Stanley uses as bait to capture enormous white sea bass lead him to the parlor of an attractive widow.
2	"The Great Yacht Club Robbery"	Unknown	Unknown	October 1, 1964
Sam unwittingly charters his fishing boat to a band of armed robbers fleeing a crime.
3	"The Return of Barbara Wyntoon"	Unknown	Unknown	October 8, 1964
Sam and Commodore Wyntoon worry over a mysterious trip by their respective offspring to Tijuana, Mexico, known for its "quickie" weddings.
4	"To Sam, He's a Swimmer"	Unknown	Unknown	October 15, 1964
Commodore Wyntoon schemes for the defeat of Jim Bailey and the return of the around-the-stand swimming race trophy to the yacht club.
5	"Mutiny"	Unknown	Unknown	November 5, 1964
Sam faces a mutiny from passengers of the Island Princess after he refuses to take its passengers back to shore, where a process server awaits him.
6	"My Son, the Dreamer"	Unknown	Unknown	November 12, 1964
Fearful that Commodore Wyntoon will make another attempt to squeeze him off his property, Sam signs his estate over to his son.
7	"Wanna Buy a Hot Turkey?"	Unknown	Unknown	November 19, 1964
Commodore Wyntoon makes an attempt to frame the Baileys for stealing a turkey after Buck unknowingly buys a stolen bird.
8	"Buck Ships Out"	Unknown	Unknown	November 26, 1964
The call of the four winds and seven seas, coupled with petty quarrels with Sam, stir Buck Singleton to ship out from Bailey's Landing.
9	"Captain Stanley"	Unknown	Unknown	December 3, 1964
The Bailey's neighbor, five-year-old Stanley, takes charge of Sam's harbor tours when Sam falls victim to illness.
10	"Las Vegas By the Sea"	Unknown	Unknown	December 10, 1964
A floating dice game is started on the Island Princess after Buck's unemployed gambler friend, Shorty McAllister, is hired.
11	"Look Who's a Sailor"	Charles Barton	Sid Morse & Arthur Julian	December 17, 1964
Following an argument with his father, Jim Bailey defects to the side of the yachting set, forcing Sam to seek a replacement for Jim's chores.
12	"Won't You Come Home, Sam Bailey?"	Unknown	Unknown	December 24, 1964
When Sam meets an attractive actress, he decides to court her while at the same time continuing his wooing of widow Emily Sheldon.
13	"Happiness is a Seal Called Lester"	Unknown	Unknown	December 31, 1964
An affectionate seal named Lester moves into the Bailey household and improves Sam's business in the process.
14	"Bailey's Band"	Charles Barton	Sid Morse	January 7, 1965
Sam finds a way to express his anger after the park closes before his band has an opportunity to perform.
15	"Sam's Dream"	Unknown	Unknown	January 14, 1965
Sam dreams he is commodore of the yacht club and devises a plan to force Commodore Wyntoon to sell property to him.
16	"Sam and the Surfers"	Unknown	Unknown	January 21, 1965
A secret formula for treating surfboards leads to the kidnapping of a teenage chemistry wizard.
17	"To Hawaii with Love"	Unknown	Unknown	January 28, 1965
Commodore Wyntoon and his superior in yacht club affairs, Walter Langley, conspire to remove Jim Bailey from both the Balboa scene and Barbara Wyntoon's life.
18	"The Education of Sam Bailey"	Unknown	Unknown	February 4, 1965
While caring for Stanley for one week, Sam gets in trouble when he takes the child out of nursery school in a dispute over educational methods.
19	"Sam and the Invisible Man"	Bruce Bilson	Sid Morse	February 11, 1965
Sam's nephew turns "invisible" in an attempt to escape deportation from Balboa and the end of a romance.
20	"The Antique Car Race"	Unknown	Unknown	February 18, 1965
Commodore Wyntoon challenges Sam and Buck to match his "achievement" of getting a speeding ticket in a vintage car.
21	"The Haunted Van"	Unknown	Unknown	February 25, 1965
Commodore Wyntoon devises with Jim Bailey to spook Buck out of his moving van and back into the household.
22	"Stanley the Runaway"	Unknown	Unknown	March 4, 1965
Stanley becomes a nursery school dropout to join the crew of the Island Princess, and seems immune to Sam's attempts at child psychology.
23	"Sam's Economy Kick"	Unknown	Unknown	March 11, 1965
Sam causes an uproar when he slashes the family budget to the breaking point.
24	"Sam's Treasure Hunt"	Unknown	Unknown	March 18, 1965
A fortune in gold and precious stones lures Sam and Buck, not knowing that the "treasure map" is a fraud perpetrated by Commodore Wyntoon.
25	"Sam Sells Out"	Bruce Bilson	Arthur Julian	March 25, 1965
Sam at last submits to adversity and puts his property up for sale when expenses mount and business declines.
26	"Sam and the Sea Monster"	Unknown	Unknown	April 1, 1965
A "sea monster" throws fear into Sam and Buck when it slithers through waters and stalks sands at Bailey's Landing.
