= The Comeback Trail (2020 film) =

Film directed by George Gallo

- Release poster
- Directed by: George Gallo
- Screenplay by: George Gallo; Josh Posner
- Based on: The Comeback Trail by Harry Hurwitz
- Produced by: Philip Kim; Patrick Hibler; Joy Sirott Hurwitz; Julie Lott Gallo; Richard Salvatore; David E. Ornston
- Starring: Robert De Niro; Tommy Lee Jones; Morgan Freeman; Zach Braff; Emile Hirsch
- Cinematography: Lukasz Bielan
- Edited by: John M. Vitale
- Music by: Aldo Shllaku
- Production companies: March On Productions; Alla Prima; Bay Point Media; Capstone Global; Sprockefeller Pictures
- Distributed by: Cloudburst Entertainment; Decal Releasing
- Release dates: October 9, 2020 (Monte Carlo); February 25, 2025 (United States)
- Running time: 104 minutes
- Country: United States
- Language: English
- Box office: $2.4 million

The Comeback Trail is a 2020 American crime comedy film directed by George Gallo and written by Gallo and Josh Posner, based on the 1982 film of the same name by Harry Hurwitz. It stars Robert De Niro, Tommy Lee Jones, Morgan Freeman, Zach Braff, and Emile Hirsch.

The film premiered at the 2020 Monte-Carlo Comedy Film Festival. It was released in theatres and on video on demand in the United States on February 25, 2025, by Cloudburst Entertainment and Decal Releasing.

== Plot ==
In spring 1974 after his latest movie tanks at the box office, producer Max Barber is in deep debt to mobster Reggie Fontaine. Rival producer James Moore offers to settle his debt, even offering $1 million for a script to a movie called “Paradise“, which Max owns the rights to. Max reluctantly agrees, but changes his mind when he by chance witnesses the death of movie star Frank Pierce, after which Moore receives $5 million insurance money.

Realizing he can pay off his debt and go to Paradise, Max creates a new movie to kill off his lead and collect the money. Stumbling upon suicidal Western Star Duke Montana in a nursing home, Max and his nephew Walter Creason convince him to star in their next project. However, Max's initial plan to set Duke on fire on the first day of shooting fails.

Max's subsequent attempts on Duke's life by collapsing a bridge and having him attacked by a bull also fail. Upon seeing raw footage, Max realizes that they are shooting a good movie; however, he is knocked out by his latest scheme to kill Duke. When he wakes up, Walter chastises him, having figured out he has tried to kill Duke all along. When Max reveals that he has not used his own money but borrowed another $1 million from Reggie, both realize they have to stop him from killing Duke himself.

Reggie and his thugs promptly arrive during a shootout scene and attempt to kill Duke. Max pleads with Reggie, who decides to let them finish the movie after Walter shows them the raw footage. However, Duke finds out the truth and briefly returns to being suicidal; nevertheless, he finishes the movie, which is released to great success.

== Cast ==
- Robert De Niro as Max Barber, Walter's uncle
- Tommy Lee Jones as Duke Montana
- Morgan Freeman as Reggie Fontaine
  - Kyron Bonner as Young Reggie Fontaine
- Zach Braff as Walter Creason, Max's nephew
- Eddie Griffin as Devin Wilton
- Emile Hirsch as James Moore
- Kate Katzman as Megan Albert, Film Director
- Blerim Destani as Boris
- Sheryl Lee Ralph as Bess Jones
- Leslie Stratton as Sister Mary Lilith
- Nick Vallelonga as Mobster Boss
- Vito Di Donato as Mobster #4
- Joel Michaely as Andre
- Patrick Muldoon as Frank Pierce

== Production ==
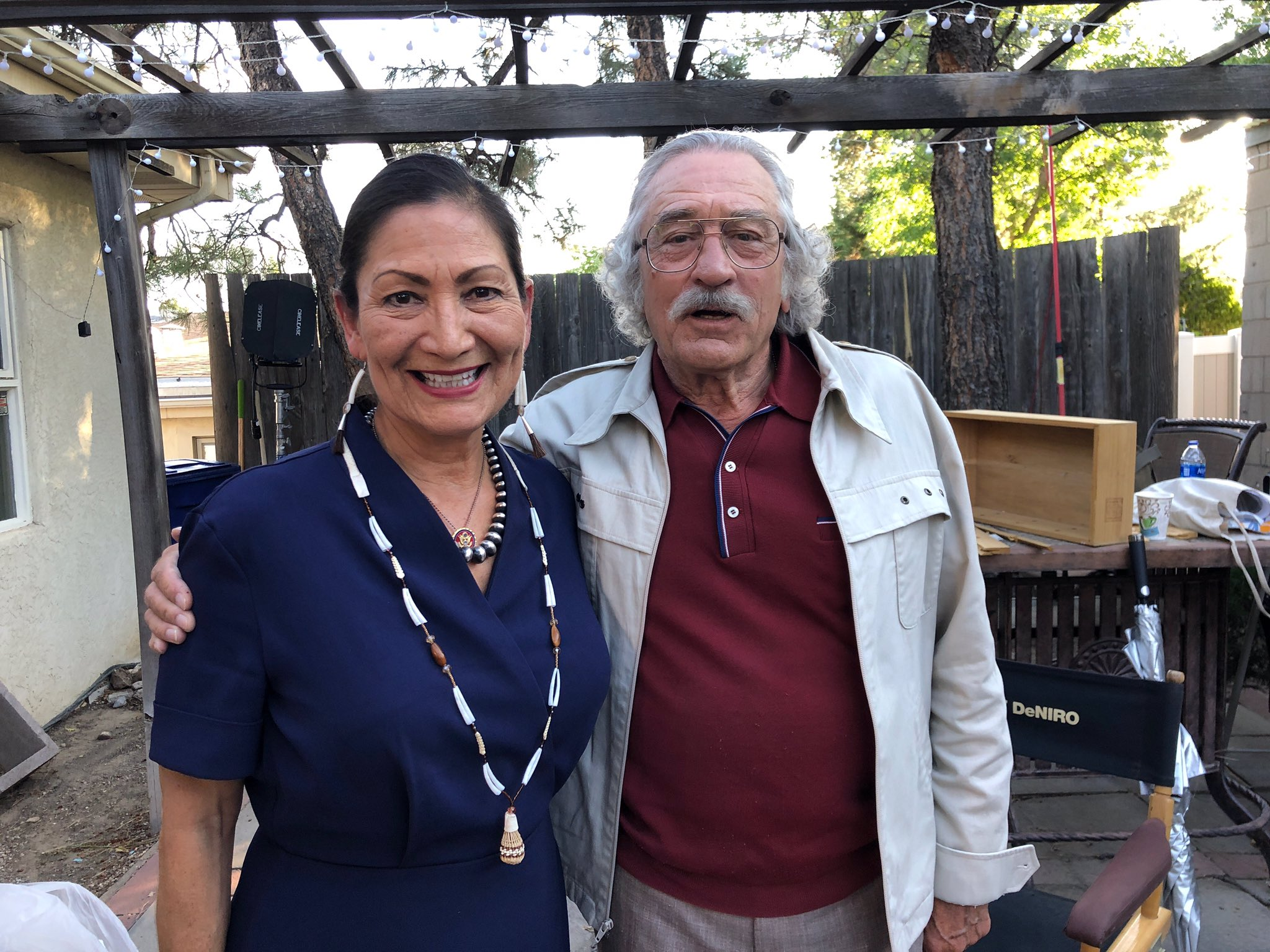
Congressmember Deb Haaland, shown here with Robert De Niro, visited the film set in 2019.

The project was announced in May 2019, with Robert De Niro, Tommy Lee Jones and Morgan Freeman cast in the film, written and directed by George Gallo. Zach Braff and Eddie Griffin were added later that month. Emile Hirsch joined the next month.

Filming began in early June 2019 and continued to July throughout New Mexico including the Bonanza Creek Ranch.

Ghalib Datta served as one of the executive producers on the film.

== Release ==
The Comeback Trail premiered at the 17th Monte-Carlo Comedy Film Festival on October 9, 2020. It was initially scheduled to be theatrically released in the United States on November 13, 2020, but was delayed to July 23, 2021, and then to November 18, 2022, before being pulled from the schedule entirely. Eventually, the film was released in the U.S. theatrically and on video on demand on February 25, 2025.

The film was first released theatrically in Australia on November 12, 2020. On June 19, 2021, it was released through Sky Cinema on the Sky TV and Now TV platforms in the United Kingdom.

== Reception ==
On Rotten Tomatoes, the film holds an approval rating of 33% based on 24 reviews, with an average rating of 5.2/10.
