= Richard (film) =

- Directed by: Harry Hurwitz; Lorees Yerby
- Written by: Bertrand Castelli; Harry Hurwitz; Lorees Yerby
- Produced by: Bertrand Castelli; Lorees Yerby
- Starring: John Carradine; Vivian Blaine; Mickey Rooney
- Cinematography: Victor Petrashevic
- Edited by: Emil Haviv
- Production company: Aurora City Group
- Distributed by: Billings
- Release date: July 31, 1972
- Running time: 83 minutes
- Country: United States
- Language: English

Richard is a 1972 film co-directed by Harry Hurwitz and Lorees Yerby. The film was notable as it was a lampoon of President Richard Nixon before the Watergate scandal.

== Plot ==
In order to earn his wings, a Guardian Angel (Rooney) comes down from heaven to train Richard (Dixon) to be President of the United States. He wins the 1968 presidential election, which was, in reality, sponsored by a group of Irishmen on a bet.

== Cast ==
- Mickey Rooney as Guardian Angel
- Imogene Bliss as Mother
- Marvin Braverman as Hardhat
- John Carradine as Plastic Surgeon
- Richard M. Dixon as Richard (spoof of 37th President Richard M. Nixon
- Paul Ford as Washington, D.C. Doctor
- Kevin McCarthy as another Washington, D.C. Doctor
- Vivian Blaine
