= Mack & Myer for Hire =

- Genre: Sitcom
- Created by: Mickey Deems
- Written by: Mickey Deems
- Directed by: Ted Devlet
- Starring: Mickey Deems; Joey Faye
- Opening theme: "Round & Round" by Albert Marlowe
- Ending theme: "Round & Round" by Albert Marlowe
- Country of origin: United States
- Original language: English
- No. of seasons: 1
- No. of episodes: 202

Production
- Executive producer: Sandy Howard
- Production locations: Hempstead Film Studios, Long Island, New York
- Running time: 12 min. (approx.)
- Production company: Trans-Lux Television

Original release
- Network: Syndication
- Release: 1963

Mack and Myer for Hire is an American sitcom that aired in first-run syndication in 1963 and 1964, and remained popular for years in reruns. The show starred Broadway comic Mickey Deems and burlesque comedian Joey Faye, and was produced by Trans-Lux Television in New York. Each episode, designed for a five-days-a-week, 15-minute time slot, was approximately 12 minutes long, and the show was filmed using a two-camera setup. Two-hundred-and-two episodes were produced during its one year in production, and these were re-run well into the 1970s. The series was produced by Sandy Howard and directed by Ted Devlet.

== Premise ==
Mack (Mickey Deems) and Myer (Joey Faye), traveling by motorcycle with sidecar, hire themselves out as general help. Their occupations vary in each episode (carpentry, plumbing, bricklaying, etc.) and they tackle each job earnestly but clumsily. Many of the comedy routines were based on old burlesque sketches: Abbott and Costello's "Higher and Lower" had Myer auditioning a song on stage while Mack was raising or lowering some scenery, resulting in Myer singing higher or lower as directed by the stage manager. Other episodes were based on bygone slapstick movie comedies. One was inspired by Laurel and Hardy's famous silent comedy Big Business, with salesmen Mack and Myer tangling with a belligerent customer, and both sides taking turns destroying each other's property. Co-star Mickey Deems fondly recalled, "Stan Laurel, whom I was blessed to know, gave me hundreds of physical gags over the telephone." Still other episodes went back to the Robert Benchley and Pete Smith comedies of the 1930s and '40s, with Mack and Myer in a common, everyday situation (e.g., going to the dentist, having insomnia, encountering salespeople).

== Production ==
Mack and Myer for Hire was filmed at a breakneck pace, with cast and crew filming each episode in a single day. "Sandy Howard was a good guy but a lousy producer," said Mickey Deems. "He wanted to do two episodes a day, which would have been impossible!" The actors needed time to stage the gags, and the technical crew needed time to shift the cameras, lights, and microphones after each take. New York-based character comedians Danny Dayton, Hank Garrett, and Alan Oppenheimer appeared in multiple episodes, playing various comic foils for Deems and Faye. Some episodes had guest stars: doubletalk specialist Al Kelly, character comedians Al Lewis and Dom DeLuise, character actress Margaret Hamilton, and cartoon voice performers Sid Raymond and Kenny Delmar.

Alan Oppenheimer described a typical working day: "They picked me up on Fifth Avenue and 50-something Street, standing in front of a building, at about six in the morning, and we'd drive down to Long Island to the studio there [in Hempstead, New York]. We spent the morning doing a table read and rewriting. Mickey [Deems] and Sandy [Howard] rewrote every script. And then we'd film a 15-minute script in the afternoon. We did one a day, that's it."

Since each Mack & Myer episode was approximately 12 minutes long, it was usually shown as part of a longer program. This was common at the time, as many stations across the United States would have weekday children's shows, often hosted by local TV personalities, which included short films such as Mack & Myer, Clutch Cargo and The Three Stooges combined with station-produced host segments. Like many sitcoms of the 1960s, Mack & Myer for Hire had a laugh track, although some surviving prints did not.

Much of the action was scripted and staged by Mickey Deems, who verified that the budgets were extremely low. The soundstage was very small and cramped, the breakaway walls were sometimes made of paper, and large-scale staging was out of the question (a theater crowd, for example, consisted of only nine people). "Some of my favorites are episodes we shot during one week when our budget was so low, they couldn't hire guest actors. So Joey and I, with the help of a great makeup artist and wardrobe guy, had to play all the parts!" One of these was "Mack the Miser", with Deems playing Ebenezer Scrooge and the ghostly visitors from Charles Dickens's A Christmas Carol.

Mack & Myer for Hire proved popular with children, which kept the show in circulation well into the 1970s. The basic visual comedy allowed the show to be exported around the world, to such countries as West Germany, Japan, and Australia.

== DVD release and availability ==
Six episodes of the show were released on DVD by Alpha Video on August 22, 2006. These six episodes, believed to be in the public domain, can also be seen at the Internet Archive.
