= Phyllis Love =

American actress (1925–2011)

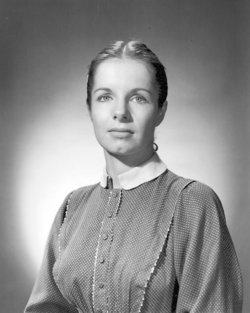
- Still from Friendly Persuasion (1956)
- Born: Phyllis Ann Love; December 21, 1925; Des Moines, Iowa, U.S.
- Died: October 30, 2011 (aged 85); Menifee, California, U.S.
- Occupations: Stage, television actress
- Years active: 1948–1975
- Spouse(s): James Vincent McGee (m.1948–1978; divorced); Alan Paul Gooding (m.1983–2011; her death)
- Parent(s): Jack Love; Lois Love

Phyllis Ann Love (December 21, 1925 – October 30, 2011) was an American theater and television actress.

== Early years ==
Love was born in Des Moines, Iowa. Her parents were Jack Love, who owned a food market, and Lois Love, who owned a cafe prior to marriage. Her schooling came at Perkins Elementary School, Callanan Junior High School, and Theodore Roosevelt High School in Des Moines. Beginning in 1948, she attended the Carnegie Institute of Technology in Pittsburgh for an unknown length of time.

== Career ==
After moving to New York, Love joined the recently formed Actors Studio. Her debut on television came in the studio's Actors Studio series; her Broadway and big screen bows, the year after that, as, respectively, Julie Harris's understudy in the stage adaptation of The Member of the Wedding, and, an uncredited performer in the film So Young So Bad.

Throughout the 1950s she acted in Broadway productions and the occasional film. Her Broadway credits include A Distant Bell (1959), Flowering Cherry (1959), The Egghead (1957), The Rose Tattoo (1950), and The Country Girl (1950). She won the Clarence Derwent Award in 1951 for her role in The Rose Tattoo. That role also brought her a Donaldson Award for Best Supporting Performance (Actress) for 1950–1951.

She played Mattie Birdwell in the film Friendly Persuasion (1956), and Dick Clark's pregnant wife in The Young Doctors (1961). On television, she appeared principally in guest roles from 1950 until her retirement in the early 1970s. Among her roles were two guest appearances on Perry Mason, both times as the defendant, as Ellen Carter in the 1962 episode "The Case of the Bogus Books", and the part of Minerva Doubleday in the 1964 episode "The Case of the Wooden Nickels". In 1961 she played Dot the waitress in season 4 episode 17 and 18 of Have Gun - Will Travel, and in 1962 she played Mrs. Lucas in the 3rd-season episode "Four O'Clock" in The Twilight Zone. In 1964 she played Jennifer May in the episode "Doctor's Wife" in the TV series Gunsmoke. In 1965 she played Lieutenant Jenkins in Season 1, Episode 19 "Faith, Hope and Sergeant Aronson" in the TV series 12 O'Clock High.

For 15 years, Love was on the faculty at Morningside High School in Inglewood, California, teaching drama and English.

== Personal life ==
Love and James Vincent McGee were married for 30 years, from 1948 until they divorced in 1978. On January 22, 1983, Love married Alan Paul Gooding. They remained married until her death in 2011.

== Death ==
On October 30, 2011, Love died at her home in Menifee, California, at age 85.

== Filmography ==
| Year | Title | Role | Notes |
|---|---|---|---|
| 1956 | So Young So Bad | Delinquent Girl | Uncredited |
| 1956 | Friendly Persuasion | Mattie Birdwell | |
| 1960 | Alfred Hitchcock Presents | Sue | Season 5 Episode 18: "Backward, Turn Backward" |
| 1961 | Have Gun, Will Travel | Dot | "A Quiet Night in Town" |
| 1961 | Gunsmoke | Beth | "Bless Me Till I Die" |
| 1961 | The Young Doctors | Mrs. Elizabeth Alexander | |
| 1962 | Going My Way | Sister Mary Matthews | two episodes |
| 1962 | Perry Mason | Ellen Carter | "The Case of the Bogus Books" |
| 1962 | The Untouchables | Ginnie Littlesmith | "The Ginnie Littlesmith Story" |
| 1964 | The Outer Limits | Andrea Holm | "A Feasibility Study" |
| 1964 | Gunsmoke | Jennifer May | "Doctor's Wife" |
| 1964 | Perry Mason | Minerva Doubleday | "The Case of the Wooden Nickels" |
| 1967 | The FBI | two characters | three episodes |
