= Lorees Yerby =

American playwright and filmmaker (1930–1996)

- Born: January 9, 1930; San Francisco, California, U.S.
- Died: 1996 (aged 65–66); Santa Monica, California, U.S.
- Occupations: Playwright; filmmaker; businesswoman
- Notable work: Richard (1972)
- Spouse: David Walker (divorced) Mike Dutton (m. 1954, divorced) Bertrand Castelli (divorced)
- Children: 2
- Awards: Guggenheim Fellow (1976)

Lorees Yerby (January 9, 1930 - 1996) was an American playwright and filmmaker. She originally worked as a collaborator with her second husband, television producer Mike Dutton, and they ran Coffee House Positano from 1957 until 1963. She wrote several plays and was a 1976 Guggenheim Fellow, and she co-wrote, co-directed, and (alongside her third husband Bertrand Castelli) co-produced a feature film, Richard (1972).

== Biography ==
Yerby was born on January 9, 1930, in San Francisco, daughter of Loretta Murphy and Rees Owen Yerby. During her youth, she worked several jobs as radio station traffic manager, San Francisco Examiner copy girl, and United Nations page. She dropped out of University of California, Berkeley after staying for one semester. Her first husband was David Walker until they divorced.

Arriving in New York City, Yerby worked at CBS' New York office as a receptionist, as well as a model. In 1954, she married Mike Dutton, whom she met during her Bohemian trip to the Italian town of Positano; she had been a contestant for Your Big Moment, a television show Dutton was producing. The duo subsequently worked on two television pilots, while she competed on The Kathy Godfrey Show, a game show her husband also produced. She and Dutton ran Coffee House Positano, a coffee house in Malibu, from 1957 until its dissolution in 1963. She also appeared in You Bet Your Life but lost after failing to say the secret word.

After divorcing Dutton following their coffee house's closure, Yerby married French stage producer Bertrand Castelli. Her one-act plays Save Me A Place at Forest Lawn and The Last Minstrel were performed at the Pocket Theatre in New York City in 1963, and Dramatists Play Service published the former in 1964. Another play she wrote, Golden Bull of Boredom, aired on CBC Television in 1965.

Yerby co-wrote, co-directed, and (alongside her husband) co-produced Richard, a 1972 comedy film satirizing then-president Richard Nixon. The film was a box-office failure and the couple were financially devastated by the loss, eventually divorcing. In 1976, she was awarded a Guggenheim Fellowship for a play trilogy titled Our Fathers; while writing for all three parts was completed, the play itself never reached production stage.

Yerby had two sons with her second husband, Michael and Winston.

Yerby died in 1996 in Ocean Park, a neighborhood in Santa Monica, where she had lived during the last part of her life.

== Filmography ==
Year	Title	Notes	Ref.
1972	Richard	As co-director, co-writer, and co-producer	
