= Al Kelly =

Double-talk comedian and stooge

- Born: Abraham Kalish; December 18, 1896; Kreva, Russian Empire (now Belarus)
- Died: September 7, 1966 (aged 69); New York City, U.S.
- Occupation: Comedian
- Known for: Double-talk routines

Al Kelly (December 18, 1896, (Note: Kelly's birthdate was eventually found to be in 1896; before that, he was believed to be born in 1899 (it is common in the show-biz to bill oneself younger), hence the "1899" found in older reference books, and titles such as "Dies in N.Y. at 67" in newspapers (he actually died at 69).) – September 7, 1966) was an American vaudeville comedian specializing in double-talk. From the 1930s he was working as a stooge (comic foil) for Broadway headliner Willie Howard.

When raconteur Joey Adams broke Willie Howard's record as the longest-running entertainer at Lou Walters's Latin Quarter nightclub, Howard's old friend Al Kelly congratulated Adams in double-talk: "I want to thank Joey Adams for the many plyds he grand since the days of Willie Howard and to Lou Walters for the cravinating many tribnitz like Flo Ziegfeld all of which have been draimen, and I mean it."

== Biography ==
Kelly was born Abraham Kalish in Kreva, Russian Empire (now Belarus), the eldest of six children of Max and Gelle (Mary) Kalish. The family immigrated to the United States in 1906. His younger siblings were Benjamin, Isidore, Israel, Fannie, and Annie. His parents both worked in the garment industry.

Kelly began his show-business career in 1914, in an act called Nine Crazy Kids, then started performing comic monologues. Early in his career, he performed largely in the Borscht Belt. When he was performing this stand-up comedy in the 1930s, he fluffed a joke so that it came out as nonsense: this scrambled dialogue got a good laugh so he made it the focus of his act.

When Willie Howard was signed by Educational Pictures to film a series of two-reel comedies, Al Kelly appeared in one of them (Playboy Number One, 1937). In 1941 Howard was filming comedy routines for the Soundies movie jukeboxes, and Kelly worked opposite Howard there as well (Comes the Revolution, 1941).

Kelly was well known among show-business professionals as a double-talk artist, and they employed Kelly to do his fractured-English specialty on their TV programs, including Milton Berle's Texaco Star Theater, The Ed Sullivan Show, The Steve Allen Show, The Ernie Kovacs Show, The Jackie Gleason Show, The Dinah Shore Chevy Show, The Eddie Fisher Show, The Jack Paar Program, Candid Camera, The Tonight Show starring Johnny Carson, and The Soupy Sales Show. He was also an actor in supporting roles, as in the children's TV series Mack & Myer for Hire.

Kelly died at age 69 in the early hours of September 7, 1966, of a heart attack while sitting in the audience in the dining room at one of his favorite venues, The Friars' Club, in New York City, during a roast. On September 8, 1966, a crowded memorial service was conducted at Riverside Memorial Chapel (Amsterdam Avenue and 76th Street), New York City.

== Legacy ==
- Al Kelly was referenced by Ben Katchor in a Julius Knipl, Real Estate Photographer strip as "Noel Kapish, the famous double-talk artist of the 1950s and 1960s" (a play on both "Kalish" and "capeesh?").
- Al Kelly was featured by Drew Friedman in his book Old Jewish Comedians (2006), "a collection of portraits of famous and forgotten Jewish comics of film and TV in their old age".
- Al Kelly was described by Marx Brothers screenwriter Irving Brecher in 2006: "Al did double talk. That was his style. He spoke gibberish in vaudeville sketches [...] most comedians couldn't do it like Al Kelly could. He was unique."
