= Harry Hurwitz =

American film director and painter

Harry L. Hurwitz
- Born: January 27, 1938; New York City, United States
- Died: September 21, 1995 (aged 57); Los Angeles, California, United States
- Occupations: Film director; screenwriter; producer; artist
- Years active: 1971–1994
- Spouse: Joy Hurwitz

Harry Hurwitz (January 27, 1938 – September 21, 1995) was an American film director, screenwriter, actor and producer.

== Biography ==
Hurwitz attended The High School of Music & Art and New York University, where he received a B.S. in 1960 and an M.A. in 1962. Before becoming a director, Hurwitz worked intermittently as a drawing, painting and filmmaking instructor at various institutions, including New York University, the State University of New York at New Paltz, Cooper Union, Parsons School of Design, Queens College, Purchase College, the New York Institute of Technology and the Pratt Institute. His directorial debut film The Projectionist included the first acting role for actor/comedian Rodney Dangerfield. He used the pseudonym Harry Tampa for what he called his "disco vampire movies."

In the early 1970s, Hurwitz was an artist-in-residence at the University of South Florida in Tampa. It was at that time that he produced the black-and-white serigraphic self-portrait that briefly (and inexplicably, as the film is set in Los Angeles) appears on the walls of the main character May's (Susan Dey) apartment in the 1986 film Echo Park.

== Painting ==
As a painter, Hurwitz has work in the permanent collections of the Metropolitan Museum of Art, the National Gallery of Art, the Corcoran Gallery of Art (now defunct) and the Philadelphia Museum of Art.

== Filmography ==
Title	Year	Director	Writer	Producer	Role	Notes
The Projectionist	1970	Yes	Yes	Yes	Friendly Usher	directorial debut, also editor
Chaplinesque, My Life and Hard Times	1972	Yes	Yes	Yes		documentary film
Richard	1972	Yes	Yes	No		
Fairy Tales	1978	Yes	No	No		as Harry Tampa
Auditions	1978	Yes	No	No	The Director (uncredited)	as Harry Tampa
Nocturna: Granddaughter of Dracula	1979	Yes	Yes	No		as Harry Tampa
Safari 3000	1980	Yes	No	No		
Under the Rainbow	1981	No	Yes	No		
The Comeback Trail	1982	Yes	Yes	Yes		also editor
The Big Score	1983	No	No	Executive		
The Rosebud Beach Hotel	1984	Yes	Uncredited	Yes		
Once a Hero	1987	Yes	No	No		unknown episodes
That's Adequate	1989	Yes	Yes	Yes		
Fleshtone	1994	Yes	Yes	No		
