= Ina Balin =

American actress (1937–1990)

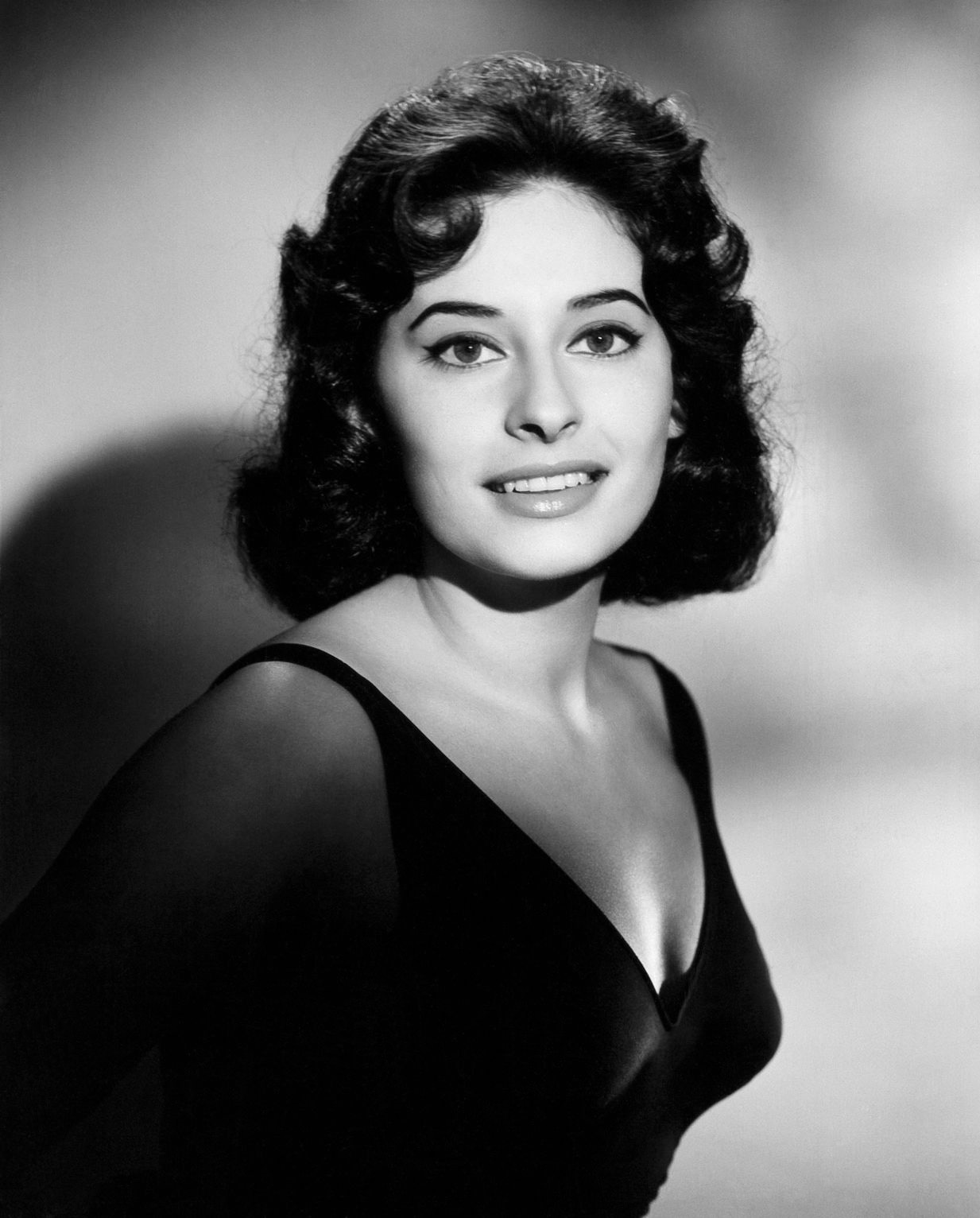
- Balin in 1960
- Born: Ina Rosenberg; November 12, 1937; Brooklyn, New York, U.S.
- Died: June 20, 1990 (aged 52); New Haven, Connecticut, U.S.
- Education: New York University
- Occupation: Actress
- Years active: 1957–1990
- Children: 3 (adopted)

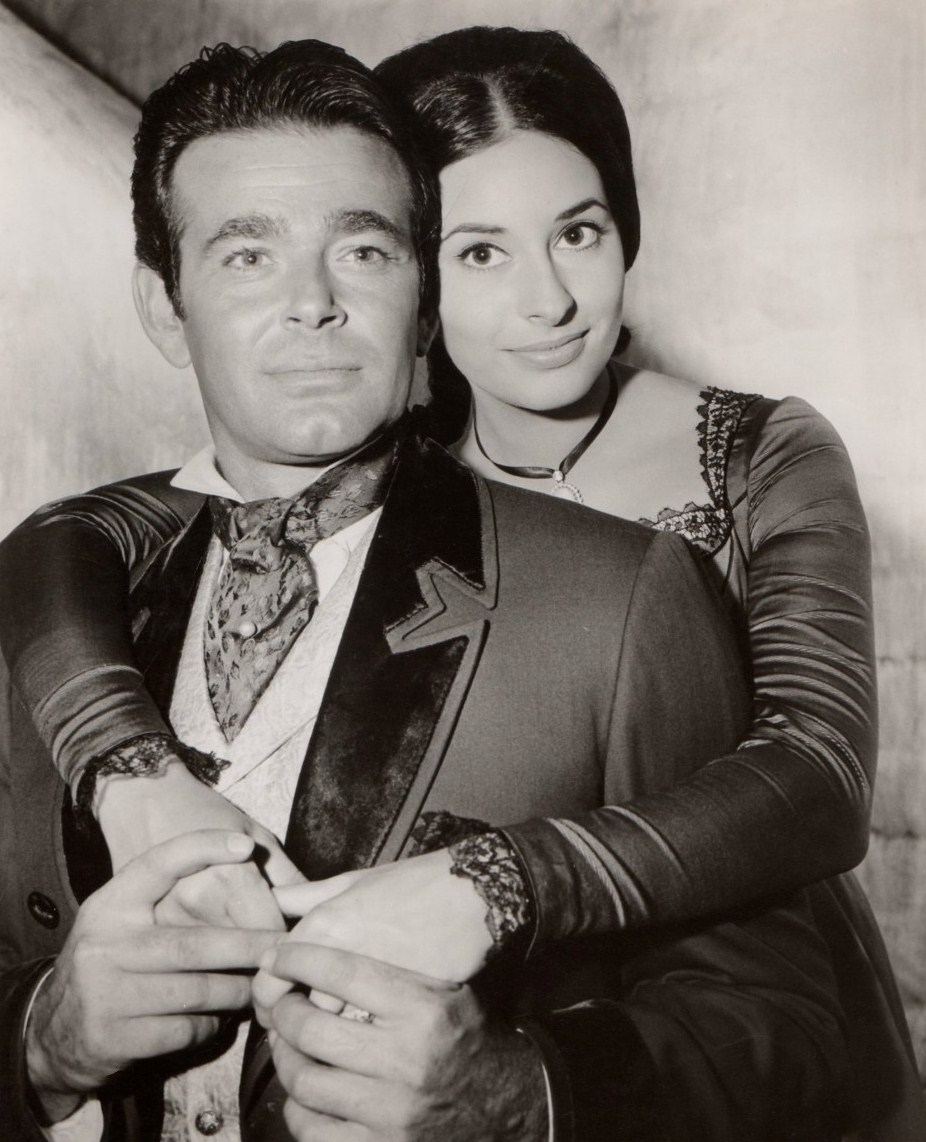
Stuart Whitman and Balin in The Comancheros (1961)

Ina Balin (née Rosenberg; November 12, 1937 – June 20, 1990) was an American stage, film, and television actress. She is best known for her role in the film From the Terrace (1960), for which she received two Golden Globe Award nominations and won one for Most Promising Newcomer – Female.

== Early years ==
Balin was born in Brooklyn, New York, to Jewish parents. Her father, Sam Rosenberg, was a dancer, singer, and comedian who worked the Borscht Belt. He later quit show business to join his family's furrier business. Her mother was a Hungarian-born professional dancer who escaped a troubled family life by marrying at age 15. Sam Rosenberg was her third husband by age 21. They, too, divorced when Ina and her brother, Richard Balin, were still quite young. The siblings were placed in boarding schools until their mother married a fourth time, then to shoe magnate Harold Balin, who later adopted Ina and Richard.

Balin graduated from high school at age 15 after having spent five years at a boarding school in Pennsylvania.

== Career ==
=== Television ===
Balin first appeared on television on The Perry Como Show. She guest-starred on dozens of television shows, including Wonder Woman; Adventures in Paradise; Bonanza; The Lieutenant; The Dick Van Dyke Show; The Six Million Dollar Man; Voyage to the Bottom of the Sea; Battlestar Galactica; Get Smart; Hart to Hart; It Takes a Thief; Ironside; Twelve O'Clock High; The Loner; Harry O.; Quincy, M.E.; The Streets of San Francisco; Magnum, P.I.; and Mannix.

She appeared with Joseph Cotten, Fernando Lamas, and Dean Jagger in the 1969 television movie The Lonely Profession.

=== Stage ===
Balin did summer stock, which led to roles on Broadway. She first starred on Broadway in Compulsion, portraying Ruth. In 1959, she had the role of Alice Black in the comedy A Majority of One.

=== Film ===
In 1959, Balin landed her first film role in The Black Orchid. She was Paul Newman's love interest in the 1960 screen adaptation of From the Terrace. In 1961, she appeared as Pilar Graile in The Comancheros with John Wayne and Stuart Whitman. Co-starring with Jerry Lewis in the 1964 hit comedy The Patsy, Balin also had a secondary part in 1965's The Greatest Story Ever Told. She also co-starred with Elvis Presley in his 1969 film Charro! She co-starred in the 1971 film The Projectionist. She also co-starred in the 1982 comedy The Comeback Trail, and she appeared in The Young Doctors, the 1961 hospital drama with Ben Gazzara and Fredric March.

== Awards ==
In 1959, Balin won the Theatre World Award for her performance in the Broadway comedy A Majority of One. In 1961, in recognition of her critically acclaimed performance in From the Terrace, she won the New Star of the Year-Actress Golden Globe Award and was nominated for the Golden Globe Award for Best Supporting Actress — Motion Picture.

== Vietnam ==
In 1966, Balin made her first of several trips to Vietnam with the USO. In 1975, she aided in the evacuation of orphans during the fall of Saigon. She later adopted three Vietnamese children: Nguyet Baty, Ba-Nhi Mai, and Kim Thuy. Ba-Nhi Mai and Kim Thuy were raised by Hollywood talent agent Ted Ashley and his wife. In 1980, she played herself in The Children of An Lac, a television movie based on her experiences.

== Death ==
Balin died on June 20, 1990, at Yale–New Haven Hospital in New Haven, Connecticut. Her death resulted from complications from chronic lung disease, including pulmonary hypertension. She had been at the hospital seeking a lung transplant.

== Filmography ==
- The Black Orchid (1958) – Mary Valente
- From the Terrace (1960) – Natalie Benzinger
- The Young Doctors (1961) – Cathy Hunt
- The Comancheros (1961) – Pilar Graile
- The Patsy (1964) – Ellen Betz
- Act of Reprisal (1964) – Eleni
- The Greatest Story Ever Told (1965) – Martha of Bethany
- Bonanza - "Evil on Her Shoulder" (1965) - Sarah
- Run Like a Thief (1967) – Mona Shannon
- Charro! (1969) – Tracey Winters
- The Lonely Profession (1969, TV movie) – Karen Menardos
- The Desperate Mission (1969) – Otilia Ruiz
- The Projectionist (1971) – The Girl
- Call to Danger (1973, TV movie) – Marla Hayes
- The Don Is Dead (1973) – Nella
- Panic on the 5:22 (1974, ABC Movie of the Week) – Countess Hedy Maria Tovarese
- The Immigrants (1978, TV movie) – Maria Cassala
- Galyon (1980) – Janet Davis
- The Children of An Lac (1980, TV movie) – Ina Balin
- The Comeback Trail (1982) – Julie Thomas
- Vasectomy: A Delicate Matter (1986) – Regine
- That's Adequate (1989) – Sister Mary Enquirer
