= Coffee House Positano =

Cafe in Malibu, California, United States (1957–1962)

Coordinates: 34.039°N 118.600°W

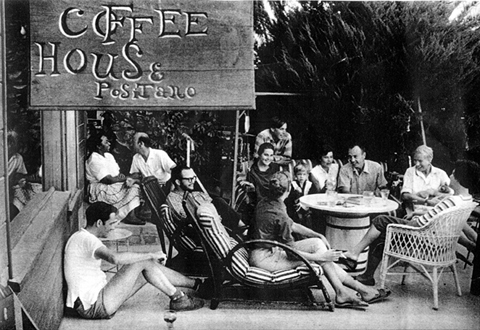
- The veranda of Coffee House Positano
- Industry: coffee house
- Founded: 1957
- Founder: Mike Dutton and Lorees Yerby
- Defunct: 1962
- Headquarters: Malibu

The Coffee House Positano was a cafe on the southern border of Malibu, California. It was opened in 1957 by Mike Dutton, a radio pioneer, and his wife, Lorees Yerby, an aspiring writer. Located on the cliff side of the Pacific Coast Highway on a 140-acre, undeveloped piece of land, (19543 Pacific Coast Highway). Positano quickly became a success even though there was no sign on the highway to indicate where it was located and the Duttons never advertised its existence. People learned of it strictly by word of mouth. Positano was fundamentally different from the some forty other coffee houses that could be found in the greater Los Angeles area. These places tended to appeal to a young crowd and were generally focused on folk music – particularly folk rock. While Positano offered some of the same things as other coffee houses – exotic coffees, deserts, sandwiches, chess games, a bookstore, poetry readings, and a place to hang out, the Duttons offered an amazing array of other activities – from avant-garde theater performances like Picasso’s one-act play, Desire Trapped by the Tail, to regularly scheduled evenings of political debate with speakers who ranged from communists to John Birchers. Writers, university professors and politicians often spoke about a vast array of topics—like anthropologist Count Taylor on the rise of black identity in the US. Authors such as John Howard Lawson, Lawrence Lipton and Anaïs Nin would read from their new works. Paintings were always on display and for sale. On the days when Positano was closed, various classes like life drawing were taught by artists such as Keith Finch. The jazz, flamenco and folk music at Positano was spontaneous and free. People would simply appear, play their music and leave. For two seasons, Playhouse Positano operated as an open-air theater.

The almost immediate popularity of Positano caused the Duttons to create a membership. People could visit only three times before joining. When Positano closed in 1962, the membership totaled over 2500 people. People in the entertainment business particularly those living in the Malibu area frequented the place – David and Gloria Stone Martin, John Howard Larson, and John Houseman to name a few. Some people from the European exile community like Aldous Huxley and Christopher Isherwood also visited. Many of the so-called beat poets, like Allen Ginsberg and Gregory Corso, came down from San Francisco to visit. The policy of the Duttons was to “ignore” any celebrity who showed up so that they could enjoy themselves without being hassled by their admirers.

Soon after Positano closed, Jerry Ziegman, a scriptwriter for the television series Peyton Place, became the resident manager of the property, representing Manocherian Brothers, and established an art community which lasted until 1993 when the buildings were burned down.

Anthropologist Jay Ruby has published an enhanced book, Coffee House Positano: Bohemian Oasis in Malibu - 1957-1962.

Special Collections at UCLA are in the process of archiving Yerby's and Jerry Ziegman's papers.
