= Fleshtone =

- UK DVD Cover
- Directed by: Harry Hurwitz
- Written by: Screenplay: Harry Hurwitz; Idea: Harry Hurwitz; Mark Stock
- Produced by: David Charles Sheldon
- Starring: Martin Kemp; Tim Thomerson
- Cinematography: Victor Petrashevic
- Edited by: Emily Paine
- Music by: Zane Cronje
- Release date: 1994
- Running time: 91 minutes
- Country: United States
- Language: English

Fleshtone is a 1994 film written and directed by Harry Hurwitz.

== Plot ==
A painter plays erotic games over the telephone with a woman. Her body is found mutilated but it may not be hers after all.

== Principal cast ==
Actor	Role
Martin Kemp	Matthew Greco
Tim Thomerson	Buddy Fields
Lise Cutter	Jennifer Womak
Graham Armitage	Dr. Sydney Frye
Suanne Braun	Wendy Pollin
