= The Projectionist (1970 film) =

- Theatrical release poster
- Directed by: Harry Hurwitz
- Written by: Harry Hurwitz
- Produced by: Harry Hurwitz
- Starring: Chuck McCann; Ina Balin; Rodney Dangerfield; Jara Kohout
- Cinematography: Victor Petrashevic
- Edited by: Harry Hurwitz
- Music by: Igo Kantor; Irma E. Levin
- Production company: Maglan Films
- Distributed by: Maron Films
- Release dates: October 17, 1970 (Rochester Film Festival); January 17, 1971 (New York City); March 24, 1971 (San Francisco)
- Running time: 88 minutes
- Country: United States
- Language: English

The Projectionist is a 1970 American comedy film written and directed by Harry Hurwitz that was the first feature film with Rodney Dangerfield as an actor. The film employed the use of superimposition of older motion pictures, the first time such techniques were used. The film clips incorporated were scenes from Gone with the Wind, Citizen Kane, Fort Apache, The Birth of a Nation, Casablanca, Gunga Din, Sergeant York, The Maltese Falcon and Barbarella.

== Plot ==
Chuck McCann, the projectionist, is seen operating projection booth equipment followed by The Projectionist opening credits. The Midtown Theater, located in Midtown Manhattan, is managed by Renaldi who continually insults and berates his employees. Spending hours in the projection booth, Chuck imagines himself as the superhero Captain Flash. When Harry, one of the ushers, enters the booth to complain about Renaldi, Chuck describes to him the beautiful woman he saw earlier, calling her "The Girl". Renaldi comes into the booth and rebukes Harry for disobeying his orders not to visit the projection area and criticizes Chuck for leaving a cigarette butt on the floor.

His mood spoiled, Chuck starts to rewind a film reel and listens to a radio broadcast, hearing, "the way I see things, I'm not very optimistic at all, I just don't think there's much hope for the future", followed by an on-screen trailer, "COMING SOON, The Terrible World of Tomorrow — SEE man become the dehumanized slave of science — SEE Years of Racial Hatred Erupt in an Orgy of Blood-Lust / As One Half of The World Assaults the Other — SEE the Horror of Total Holocaust — SEE Man Destroyed by his Own Technology / and the World Explodes in a Blaze of Hellish Fury — SEE The End of Mankind in… / The Terrible World of Tomorrow", as the radio broadcast continues, "no.. how can we disagree with Doctor Masters… gentlemen… gentlemen… gentlemen… what we're missing is the point about..."

At the end of his working day, Chuck looks at movie star photographs on the booth's wall and cabinets and impersonates the voice and mannerisms of Humphrey Bogart with quotes of film dialogue from The Treasure of the Sierra Madre, The Caine Mutiny and The Maltese Falcon (for which he also does Sydney Greenstreet). He then imitates Wallace Beery in Min and Bill, John Wayne in The Green Berets, James Stewart in The Spirit of St. Louis and Clark Gable in Gone with the Wind (for which he also does Butterfly McQueen). Finally, McCann (who hosted, from 1960 to 1962, the New York City daily children's TV show Laurel and Hardy and Chuck) glances at a photo of Laurel and Hardy and recreates their voices ("Say goodnight Stanley", "Goodnight Stanley") then, switching to Bogart, ends with, "So long, Fred C. Dobbs".

Bored with the lack of excitement and romance in his life, Chuck continues to fantasize about his adventures as Captain Flash and imagines Renaldi as a villain known as The Bat who has six henchmen and wants to possess the X-ray device invented by the aged European scientist who is in reality the old man who speaks with an accent and runs the theater's candy concession stand. The Bat kidnaps the scientist's beautiful daughter, takes Captain Flash prisoner and raves about ruling the world. The daughter, however, turns out to be skilled in karate and, with Captain Flash, defeats The Bat and dances with Captain Flash into a Busby Berkeley musical.

== Cast ==
Actor	Role
starring Chuck McCann	Chuck McCann, the projectionist / Captain Flash
special guest star Ina Balin	The Girl / the scientist's daughter
introducing Rodney Dangerfield	Renaldi / The Bat
featuring Jara Kohout	Candy Man / The Scientist

- Michael Gentry…..Usher / The Bat's henchman
- Lucky Kargo…..Usher / The Bat's henchman
- Sam Stewart…..Usher / The Bat's henchman
- David Holliday…..Fat Man / The Bat's henchman
- Alex Stevens…..Usher / The Bat's henchman
- Robert Lee…..Usher / The Bat's henchman
- Daniel Maffia
- Stephen Phillips…..Minister
- Morocco…..Belly dancer
- Clara Rosenthal…..Crazy lady
- Jacquelyn Glenn…..Nude on bearskin
- Robert Staats as the Pitchman
- Robert King as the Premiere M.C.

Uncredited

- Harry Hurwitz…..Harry, the usher who visits Chuck in the projectionist's booth
- João Fernandes…..Man on street

== Release ==
Production took place in September and October 1969 and its first public screening was a year later, at the Rochester Film Festival on October 17, 1970. The film opened in New York on January 17, 1971.
