= The Comeback Trail (1982 film) =

- Directed by: Harry Hurwitz
- Produced by: Max Rosenberg; Harry Hurwitz
- Starring: Chuck McCann; Buster Crabbe
- Cinematography: João Fernandes; Victor Petrashevic
- Edited by: Harry Hurwitz
- Music by: Igo Kantor
- Production company: Rearguard Productions
- Distributed by: Dynamite Entertainment
- Release date: March 1, 1982
- Running time: 76 minutes
- Country: United States
- Language: English
- Budget: $10 million

The Comeback Trail is a 1982 film directed by Harry Hurwitz. It stars Chuck McCann and, in his final screen role, Buster Crabbe. It was filmed in 1974. A remake of the film premiered in 2020.

The film features several cameos of people playing themselves, such as Hugh Hefner, Henny Youngman, and Irwin Corey.

== Plot ==
Two down-on-their-luck film producers, Eastman and Kodac, decide to make a Western film with Duke Montana, a veteran cowboy star, in hopes that he will die and they will collect the insurance money.

== Principal cast ==
Actor	Role
Chuck McCann	Enrico Kodac
Buster Crabbe	Duke Montana
Robert Staats	E. Eddie Eastman
Ina Balin	Julie Thomas
Jára Kohout	German Producer
