= Ray Stewart (actor) =

American film and television actor

- Born: April 21, 1932 (age 94); San Benito, Texas, U.S.
- Occupations: Film and television actor

Ray Stewart (born April 21, 1932) is an American film and television actor. He is best known for playing the recurring role of Marty Morrison's gay boyfriend Darryl Driscoll in the American sitcom television series Barney Miller.

In 1978, Stewart starred as Nurse Newton in the NBC comedy television series A.E.S. Hudson Street, starring along with Gregory Sierra, William Cort and Rosanna DeSoto. He guest-starred in television programs including Falcon Crest, The Rockford Files, The Bob Newhart Show, Fantasy Island, Benson and L.A. Law, and played Mr. Lyons in the NBC soap opera television series Days of Our Lives. He also appeared in films such as Space Raiders, The Vals and Deuce Coupe.
