= Nixon in China (disambiguation) =

Nixon in China is an opera by John Adams.

Nixon in China may also refer to:

- 1972 visit by Richard Nixon to China
- Nixon goes to China, metaphor for an unexpected or uncharacteristic action by a politician
- Nixon in China (2006), non-fiction book by Margaret MacMillan
