= Hudson Street =

Hudson Street may refer to:

- Hudson Street (album), 2000 debut album by Northern Irish electronic duo Agnelli & Nelson
- Hudson Street (Manhattan), north–south oriented street in the New York City borough of Manhattan
- Hudson Street (TV series), 1995-1996 American sitcom that aired on ABC
- A.E.S. Hudson Street, 1978 comedy television show running on ABC
