= Island Women =

1958 film

- Theatrical release poster
- Directed by: William Berke
- Written by: Andrew Alexander; Philip Yordan
- Produced by: William Berke
- Starring: Marie Windsor; Vince Edwards; Marilee Earle; Leslie Scott; Irene Williams
- Cinematography: Jockey Arthur Feindel
- Edited by: Everett Sutherland
- Music by: Alice D. Simms; Charles Lofthouse
- Production company: Security Pictures
- Distributed by: United Artists
- Release date: May 1958
- Running time: 72 minutes
- Country: United States
- Language: English

Island Women is a 1958 American drama film directed by William Berke and written by Andrew Alexander and Philip Yordan. The film stars Marie Windsor, Vince Edwards, Marilee Earle, Leslie Scott and Irene Williams. The film was released in May 1958 by United Artists.

== Cast ==
- Marie Windsor as Elizabeth
- Vince Edwards as Mike
- Marilee Earle as Jan
- Leslie Scott as Eban
- Irene Williams as Iron Woman
- Kay Barnes as Mary Ann
- Paul White as Constable
- Maurine Duvalier as Calypso Mama
