= Space Raiders (film) =

1983 film

- Theatrical release poster
- Directed by: Howard R. Cohen
- Written by: Howard R. Cohen
- Produced by: Roger Corman
- Starring: Vince Edwards; David Mendenhall; Patsy Pease; Thom Christopher; Luca Bercovici
- Cinematography: Alec Hirschfeld
- Edited by: R. J. Kizer; Tony Randel
- Music by: James Horner
- Production company: Millennium
- Distributed by: New World Pictures
- Release date: July 1983
- Running time: 84 minutes
- Country: United States
- Language: English

Space Raiders, also known as Star Child, is a 1983 American space Western film written and directed by Howard R. Cohen and produced by Roger Corman. The film was made during the time when many studios were releasing space opera films following the success of Star Wars. However, the film was panned by critics, especially for its reuse of special effects footage and music (composed by James Horner) taken from Corman's 1980 film Battle Beyond the Stars.

The film follows a young boy who gets caught up with a group of space pirates after hiding from their attack on the space ship they came to steal. The group face challenges as the leader attempts to keep his promise to return him to his homeworld.

== Plot ==
Captain C. F. "Hawk" Hawkens (Vince Edwards), a former Space Service Colonel turned pirate, leads his crew on a mission to steal a freighter owned by an interstellar corporation simply referred to as "The Company". During the theft, 10-year-old Peter (David Mendenhall), slips aboard the freighter to hide, and the pirates steal the ship unaware he is on board. After the freighter rendezvouses with Hawk's ship, the crew fight to save the life of a comrade wounded during the shootout. Meanwhile, Peter comes out of hiding and asks to be taken home.

At first, Hawk considers ransoming the child, but during a skirmish with Company fighters, Hawk's feelings change when Peter courageously volunteers to squeeze into a tight compartment to fix a damaged power conduit that allows them to escape. Hawk promises to return Peter to his home planet, Procyon III. First, however, Hawk's crew stop to rest at a space station owned by an alien crime lord, Zariatin (Ray Stewart).

On Procyon III, Peter's father meets with The Company's security director who decides to locate the boy with an advanced robot ship. This massive, fully automated battle cruiser can track an identity tag that Peter wears around his neck.

Back at Zariatin's station, a pair of bounty hunters spot Peter and realize he is a "Company kid" worth a hefty ransom. When Peter wanders off, Flightplan (Thom Christopher), a psychic alien member of Hawk's crew, senses the boy is in danger. When Hawk finds him, Zariatin arrives and is furious a child is snooping around his station. Hawk promises the kid will not be a problem, but threatens to kill Zariatin if he tries to lay a hand on him.

While Hawk and crew relax in the bar, a bored Peter slips out of his cabin and the bounty hunters follow. Meanwhile, Zariatin calls Hawk to remind him that his service fees are long past due. Zeriatin demands that Hawk steal four Company fuel ships from a depot on Regulus V, but to guarantee performance, the boy must remain at the station. Hawk refuses to leave Peter behind, but he agrees to steal the ships. He orders his crew member Amanda (Patsy Pease) to take Peter home in one of ships once the job is accomplished.

Hawk returns to Peter's cabin, but finds the boy missing and races back to the bar. In the meantime, Peter spots the bounty hunters and a chase ensues, but he is captured. Thinking Zeriatin has taken Peter, Hawk confronts him, but just then, Zariatin is alerted that the bounty hunters are making an unauthorized departure which Hawk believes can only mean that they have the boy. Hawk immediately chases after the bounty hunters, but they encounter the Company robot ship. Programmed for self-defense, the ship reacts to being fired upon and destroys the bounty hunter's ship. Peter survives by using an escape pod which Hawk retrieves.

Back on course to Regulus V, Hawk teaches Peter how to fire the ship's lasers using asteroids as target practice. Once at the planet, Hawk's crew go after the tanker ships and Hawk says goodbye to Peter. After a battle with security robots, Hawk's crew takes the ships, but nearby, the Company observes the theft with the robot ship and orders it to follow the convoy.

As Amanda travels to take Peter home, her ship is ambushed by Zeriatin's starfighters and crashes on a nearby planet. Amanda is killed by Zeriatin's thugs, and Peter is captured for ransom. Flightplan rescues the boy but is shot by Zeriatin's guards. Peter finds Hawk in the bar with his two remaining crewmen. The station is alerted to the approaching robot ship. The station launches several defense ships in response, but none can stop it. Peter and the remainder of Hawk's crew try to flee the station, but they are confronted by Zeriatin and his men. The last two of Hawk's crew are killed off, and Hawk manages to kill Zeriatin, but not before being shot himself. Peter struggles to help Hawk to his ship where they escape before the station explodes.

The robot ship pursues Hawk's ship. Unable to outrun it, Hawk tells Peter to fire the lasers the moment the robot ship lowers its defenses, which it must do to fire its weapons. Peter successfully destroys the enemy ship. A weakened Hawk returns to consciousness and takes Peter home. A sad and worried Peter disembarks the ship, and Hawk, severely wounded, flies back into space.

== Cast ==
- Vince Edwards as Hawk
- David Mendenhall as Peter
- Drew Snyder as Aldebarian
- Patsy Pease as Amanda
- Thom Christopher as Flightplan
- Luca Bercovici as Ace
- Ray Stewart as Zariatin
- George Dickerson as Tracton
- Dick Miller as Crazy Mel
- Virginia Kiser as Janeris
- William Boyett as Taggert

== Production ==
Corman sold New World Pictures in January 1983 for $16.9 million. Under the terms of the contract, he agreed to stay on as consultant for two years and that New World would distribute any movies he made until February 1984. He agreed to provide the company with a minimum of five films they could release. He set up a new production company, Millennium, named after a 1981 retrospective of Corman's work at the National Film Theatre of London. (Corman would soon change "Millennium" to "New Horizons".) He announced plans to make films budgeted between $2–5 million using funds from his sale of New World. Millennium's first films included the less-commercial Space Raiders, Love Letters, Screwballs, and Suburbia (which he acquired).

The job of directing Space Raiders, which was based on Treasure Island, went to Howard R. Cohen, who had written several films for Corman and recently turned director with Saturday the 14th. Since Cohen didn't have a lot of directing experience at the time, Corman brought in Eric Morris to assist him in setting up the shots a week before shooting commenced.

The sets used for Space Raiders were repurposed and modified from Corman's previous production of Battle Beyond the Stars and Android; some of these sets were later used in the Fred Olen Ray film Star Slammer.

== Reception ==
The Atlanta Journal said the "main problem" with the film was the character of the boy "was really creepy".

The Omaha Herald thought the movie was "perfectly suited for young movie fans".

The Boston Globe called it "a sweet little Star Wars rip off ... on cosily intimate terms with its genre."

TV Guide stated that the story was a thinly disguised rip-off of Star Wars and was disappointed that it reused both the special effects and music from Battle Beyond the Stars. The film was featured on episode #48 of the internet show Best of the Worst, produced by RedLetterMedia, where it was unanimously selected as best of the worst. In particular, the panel praised Corman's efficiency in reusing assets as well as skill in allocating a small budget.

== Home media ==
The film's trailer was featured as part of the Stephen Romano Presents Shock Festival trailer compilation three-disc set on DVD.

On 2 September 2014, Scorpion Releasing released Space Raiders on DVD as a standard release, and on Blu-ray as a 2,000-unit limited edition. Special features included the film's theatrical trailer as well as interviews with Roger Corman, star David Mendenhall, and post-production supervisor Clark Henderson.
