= Star Trek VI: The Undiscovered Country =

1991 film directed by Nicholas Meyer

- Theatrical release poster art by John Alvin
- Directed by: Nicholas Meyer
- Screenplay by: Nicholas Meyer; Denny Martin Flinn
- Story by: Leonard Nimoy; Lawrence Konner; Mark Rosenthal
- Based on: Star Trek by Gene Roddenberry
- Produced by: Ralph Winter; Steven-Charles Jaffe
- Starring: William Shatner; Leonard Nimoy; DeForest Kelley; James Doohan; Walter Koenig; Nichelle Nichols; George Takei; Kim Cattrall; David Warner; Christopher Plummer
- Cinematography: Hiro Narita
- Edited by: Ronald Roose
- Music by: Cliff Eidelman
- Production company: Paramount Pictures
- Distributed by: Paramount Pictures
- Release date: December 6, 1991
- Running time: 110 minutes
- Country: United States
- Language: English
- Budget: $30 million
- Box office: $96.8 million

Star Trek VI: The Undiscovered Country is a 1991 American science fiction film directed by Nicholas Meyer. It is the sixth feature film based on the 1966–1969 Star Trek television series. Taking place after the events of Star Trek V: The Final Frontier, it is the final film featuring the entire main cast of the original television series. An environmental disaster leads the Klingon Empire to pursue peace with their longtime adversary, the Federation; the crew of the Federation starship Enterprise must race against unseen conspirators with a militaristic agenda to prevent war.

After the critical and commercial disappointment of The Final Frontier, the next film in the franchise was conceived as a prequel, with younger actors portraying the Enterprise crew while attending Starfleet Academy. Negative reaction from the original cast and the fans led to the prequel concept being discarded. Faced with producing a new film in time for Star Trek's 25th anniversary, director Nicholas Meyer and Denny Martin Flinn wrote a script based on a suggestion from Leonard Nimoy about what would happen if "the Wall came down in space", touching on the contemporary events of the Cold War.

Principal photography took place between April and September 1991. Because of a lack of sound stage space on the Paramount lot, many scenes were filmed around Hollywood. Meyer and cinematographer Hiro Narita aimed for a darker and more dramatic mood, altering sets that were being used for the television series Star Trek: The Next Generation. Producer Steven-Charles Jaffe led a second unit to an Alaskan glacier that stood in for a Klingon gulag. Cliff Eidelman produced the film's score, which is intentionally darker than previous Star Trek offerings.

Star Trek VI: The Undiscovered Country was released in North America on December 6, 1991. It received positive reviews, with publications praising the lighthearted acting, setting and references. It posted the largest opening weekend gross of the series before going on to earn $96.8 million worldwide. The film earned two Oscar nominations, for Best Makeup and Best Sound Effects, and is the only Star Trek movie to win the Saturn Award for Best Science Fiction Film. The film has been released on various home media formats, including a special collectors' edition in 2004, for which Meyer made minor alterations to the film. It was followed by the seventh motion picture, Star Trek Generations, in 1994.

== Plot ==
The Excelsior weathers the shock wave generated by the explosion of Praxis.

In 2293, the Federation starship Excelsior, commanded by Captain Hikaru Sulu, discovers that the Klingon moon of Praxis has been destroyed in a mining accident. The loss of Praxis and the ecological devastation of the Klingon homeworld throws the Klingon Empire into turmoil. No longer able to afford war with the Federation, the Klingons pursue peace. Starfleet sends the Federation starship Enterprise to meet with the Klingon Chancellor Gorkon and escort him to negotiations on Earth. Enterprise Captain James T. Kirk, whose son David was murdered by Klingons, opposes peace and resents the assignment.

Enterprise and Gorkon's battlecruiser rendezvous and continue towards Earth, with the two command crews sharing a tense meal. Later that night, Enterprise appears to fire torpedoes at the Klingon ship, disabling its artificial gravity. During the confusion, two men wearing Starfleet spacesuits and magnetic boots beam aboard the Klingon vessel, kill two crew members, and mortally wound Gorkon before escaping. Kirk surrenders to avoid armed conflict and beams aboard with Doctor Leonard McCoy to try and save Gorkon's life. The chancellor dies, and Gorkon's chief of staff, General Chang, arrests Kirk and McCoy for his assassination. A Klingon court finds the pair guilty and sentences them to life imprisonment on the frozen planetoid Rura Penthe. Gorkon's daughter Azetbur becomes the new chancellor and continues diplomatic negotiations; the conference is relocated for security, and the new location is kept secret. While several senior Starfleet officers want to rescue Kirk and McCoy, the Federation president refuses to risk full-scale war; Azetbur likewise refuses to invade Federation space.

Kirk and McCoy arrive at the Rura Penthe mines and are befriended by Martia, a shapeshifter, who offers them an escape route; in reality, it is a ruse to make their arranged deaths appear accidental. Once her betrayal is revealed, Martia transforms into Kirk's double and fights him, but is killed by the prison governor to silence any witnesses. Kirk and McCoy are beamed aboard Enterprise by Spock, who has assumed command and launched an investigation in Kirk's absence. Determining that Enterprise did not fire the torpedoes, the crew searches for the assassins, only to find them dead. Kirk and Spock set a trap to draw out the accomplice in sick bay and discover that the killer is Spock's protégé, Valeris. To find the identity of the other conspirators, Spock initiates a forced mind-meld and learns that Federation, Klingon, and Romulan officials conspired to sabotage the peace talks. The torpedoes that struck Gorkon's cruiser came from Chang's ship, which has the unique ability to fire its weapons while cloaked.

Enterprise and Excelsior race to Khitomer, the location of the peace talks. Chang's cloaked ship attacks and inflicts heavy damage on Enterprise. At the suggestion of Spock and Uhura, Spock and McCoy modify a torpedo to home in on the exhaust emissions of Chang's ship. The torpedo impact reveals Chang's location, and Enterprise and Excelsior destroy his ship with a volley of torpedoes. The crews from both ships beam to the conference and thwart the assassination attempt on the Federation president's life.

Starfleet Command orders Enterprise to return to Earth to be decommissioned. Kirk decides to take his ship on one last cruise instead, and notes in his log a new generation of explorers will continue their legacy.

== Cast ==
The Undiscovered Country is the final appearance of all the major cast members from the original television series as a group. For the new characters, casting director Mary Jo Slater loaded the film with as many Hollywood stars as the production could afford, including a minor appearance by Christian Slater, her son. Meyer was interested in casting actors who could project and articulate feelings, even through alien makeup. Producer Ralph Winter said, "We were not looking for someone to say 'Okay, I'll do it', but people who were excited by the material [...] and would treat it as if it [were] the biggest picture ever being made."

- William Shatner as James T. Kirk, the captain of the USS Enterprise. Despite his personal hatred of the Klingons for killing his son David, Kirk is ordered to escort the Klingon High Chancellor to Earth. Shatner felt that though dramatic, the script made Kirk look too prejudiced.
- Leonard Nimoy as Spock, the Enterprise's science officer and second-in-command. Spock first opens negotiations with the Klingons after the destruction of Praxis and volunteers Kirk and the Enterprise to escort Chancellor Gorkon to Earth.
- DeForest Kelley as Leonard McCoy, the chief medical officer of the Enterprise. Kelley's appearance as McCoy in The Undiscovered Country was his last live-action role before his death in 1999. With Leonard Nimoy as the film's executive producer, the 71-year old Kelley was paid US$1 million for his role, assuring a comfortable retirement for the actor. Kelley and Shatner shot their prison scenes over the course of six to eight nights; the two actors got to know each other better than they ever had.
- James Doohan as Montgomery Scott, chief engineer aboard Enterprise. Scott discovers the assassins' clothing hidden in the dining room shortly before the two men are found dead.
- George Takei as Hikaru Sulu, captain of the USS Excelsior; despite having taken his own command, Sulu remains loyal to his former comrades aboard the Enterprise. The Undiscovered Country marked the first canonical mention of Sulu's first name, which was first mentioned in Vonda McIntyre's 1981 novel The Entropy Effect. It was included when Peter David, author of the film's comic book adaptation, visited the set and convinced Nicholas Meyer to insert it.
- Walter Koenig as Pavel Chekov, navigator and security officer on Enterprise. Chekov finds Klingon blood by the transporter pads, leading Spock to widen his search of the ship.
- Nichelle Nichols as Uhura, the Enterprise's communications officer. Uhura was supposed to give a dramatic speech in Klingon during the film, but midway through production the speech was scrapped and a scene where Uhura is speaking garbled Klingon while surrounded by books was added for extra humor. Nichols protested the scene, wondering why there were still books in the 23rd century, but accepted the change since it would be the last Star Trek film she would appear in. Being African-American, Nichols was uncomfortable with some of the dialogue's racial undertones. Nichols was originally to speak the line "Guess who's coming to dinner" as the Klingons arrive on the Enterprise; Nichols refused to say the line, which was given to Koenig's character in the final print. Nichols also refused to say the line "yes, but would you like your daughter to marry one [a Klingon]", and it was dropped from the film altogether.
- Kim Cattrall as Valeris, the Enterprise's new helmsman and the first Vulcan to graduate at the top of her class at Starfleet Academy. Valeris is the protégé of Captain Spock, who intends her to be his replacement. Initially, the character of Saavik, who appeared in the second through fourth Star Trek films, was intended to be the traitor, but Gene Roddenberry objected to making a character loved by fans into a villain. Cattrall was unwilling to be the third actress to play Saavik (a part she had originally auditioned for), but accepted the role when it became a different character. Cattrall chose the Eris element of the character's name, for the Greek goddess of strife, which was Vulcanized by the addition of the "Val" at the behest of director Nicholas Meyer. Cinefantastique reported that Cattrall participated in a photo shoot during filming on the empty Enterprise bridge, wearing nothing but her Vulcan ears. Nimoy ripped up the photographs when he learned about the unauthorized photo session, because he feared harm to the franchise if it ever came to light.
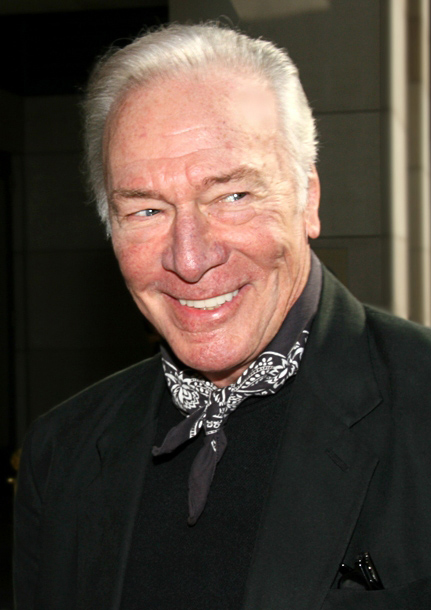
- Christopher Plummer had worked with Shatner in radio plays and requested a more human look for his character, involving wearing "less severe" Klingon make-up.
  Christopher Plummer as Chang, a one-eyed Klingon general who serves as Gorkon's chief of staff. Plummer and Shatner had performed together in various acting roles in Montreal. Meyer wrote the role for Plummer, who was initially reluctant to accept it.
- David Warner as Gorkon, the chancellor of the Klingon High Council who hopes to forge a peace between his people and the Federation. The role of Gorkon was initially offered to Jack Palance. Warner had appeared in Meyer's first film, the 1979 science-fiction movie Time After Time, and had played a human ambassador in The Final Frontier. Warner's make-up was made to resemble Abraham Lincoln, as another way of humanizing the otherwise alien Klingon leader. When filming his character's death, a large lamp exploded and rained down on Warner and Kelley; one piece barely missed striking Warner's head, which Kelley was sure would have killed him.
- Rosanna DeSoto as Azetbur, the daughter of Chancellor Gorkon who succeeds her father after his death.
- Iman as Martia, a shapeshifting alien on the prison planet Rura Penthe who leads Kirk and McCoy into a trap. When Flinn originally developed the character, he had in mind a space pirate which he described as the "dark side of Han Solo". Flinn imagined an actress like Sigourney Weaver in the role, who was "as different as night and day" from Iman. Meyer described Martia as "Kirk's dream woman", and when the makeup artists learned Iman was cast for the role they decided to enhance her graceful bird-like appearance with feathers. Yellow contact lenses completed the look.
- Brock Peters as Admiral Cartwright, a high-ranking officer in Starfleet who vehemently protests Klingon immigration into Federation space. Peters had previously appeared as Cartwright in The Voyage Home. Meyer had Peters return partly on the basis of his acting as the wrongly convicted black man Tom Robinson in To Kill a Mockingbird. Meyer thought that Cartwright's vitriolic speech against the Klingons would be particularly chilling and meaningful coming from the mouth of a black man. The speech was so repugnant to Peters that he was unable to deliver it in one take. Peters later portrayed Joseph Sisko, the father of lead character Benjamin Sisko on Star Trek: Deep Space Nine.
- Kurtwood Smith as the Federation President
- René Auberjonois as Colonel West, the would-be assassin of the Federation president. Meyer was a friend of Auberjonois and offered him a chance to cameo months before filming. His part was cut from the theatrical version but restored on home video. Auberjonois later portrayed security chief Odo on the series Star Trek: Deep Space Nine.
- Michael Dorn as Colonel Worf, the Klingon attorney who represents Kirk and McCoy in their show trial for the death of Gorkon. He later unmasks the Klingon assassin at Khitomer as Colonel West (in the footage cut from the theatrical version but restored on home video). Dorn also played a descendant of the character in Star Trek: The Next Generation and several subsequent films and series.

== Production ==
=== Development ===
Star Trek V: The Final Frontier (1989) was a critical and financial disappointment; Paramount Pictures was concerned that the Star Trek franchise would not be able to recover from the blow. With the looming 25th anniversary of the original series in 1991, producer Harve Bennett revisited an idea Ralph Winter had for the fourth film: a prequel featuring young versions of Kirk and Spock at Starfleet Academy. The prequel was designed to be a way of keeping the characters, if not the actors, in what was called "Top Gun in outer space". Bennett and The Final Frontier writer David Loughery wrote a script entitled The Academy Years, where Dr. Leonard McCoy talks about how he met Kirk and Spock while addressing a group of academy graduates. The script shows Kirk and Spock's upbringing, their meeting McCoy and Montgomery Scott at the academy and defeating a villain before parting ways. The script would have established that George Kirk, James T. Kirk's father, was a pilot who went missing—presumed dead—during a warp experiment with Scott. The script is set before the "enlightenment" of the Federation; slavery and racism are common, with Spock being bullied because he is the only Vulcan student. Nurse Christine Chapel cameos in the script's climax.

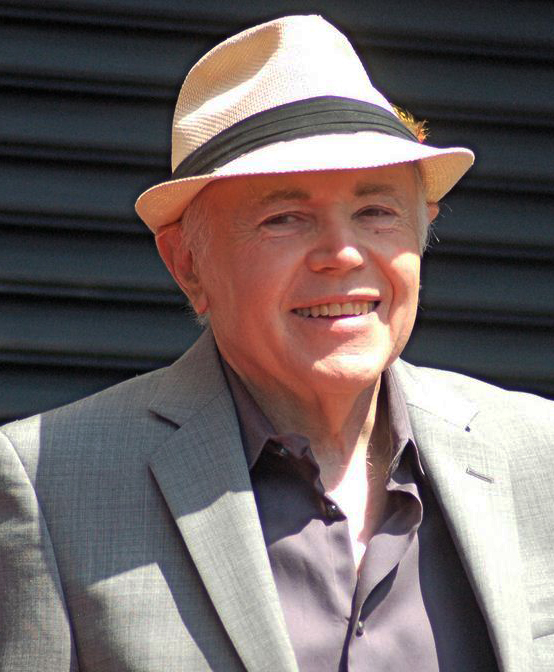
Walter Koenig wrote a story outline for the sixth film where all the Enterprise crew members except Spock and McCoy are killed.

James Doohan claimed that Paramount chief Frank Mancuso, Sr. fired Bennett following negative reaction to the pitch from the core cast, Gene Roddenberry and fans. Bennett, meanwhile, says he left the franchise after Paramount rejected the Academy script even after rewrites to appease them. "My term was up. I was offered $1.5 million to do Star Trek VI and I said 'Thanks, I don't want to do that. I want to do the Academy,'" he said. Actor Walter Koenig approached Mancuso with a new script outline codenamed "In Flanders Fields"; in it, the Romulans join the Federation and go to war with the Klingons. The Enterprise crew, except Spock, are forced to retire for not meeting fitness tests. When Spock and his new crew are captured by a monstrous worm-like race of aliens (which Koenig described as "things that the monsters in Aliens evolved from"), the old crew must rescue them. In the end, all of the characters except McCoy and Spock die.

Mancuso asked Leonard Nimoy to conceive the new film to serve as a swan song for the original cast. Nimoy, Mark Rosenthal and Lawrence Konner suggested Kirk meeting Jean-Luc Picard, but Star Trek: The Next Generation's producers rejected the idea. Nicholas Meyer, who directed The Wrath of Khan and co-wrote The Voyage Home, was also approached for an idea for the sixth film, but had none. Ralph Winter was brought on to the project as producer shortly after Bennett's departure, and said Paramount's mandate was to produce a 25th anniversary film that would not cost a lot of money.

Nimoy visited Meyer's house and suggested a plot based on how the Klingons had been Star Trek's stand-ins for the Soviet Union: "[What if] the wall comes down in outer space?" Meyer recalled that he replied "'Oh, wait a minute! Okay, we start with an intergalactic Chernobyl! Big explosion! We got no more Klingon Empire ...!' And I just spilled out the whole story!" The story included references to the contemporary political climate; the character of Gorkon was based on Mikhail Gorbachev, while the assassination storyline was Meyer's idea. He thought it was plausible that the Klingon leader who turned soft towards the enemy would be killed like similar peacemakers throughout history.

Konner and Rosenthal were originally tasked with writing the script at the behest of Teddy Zee, a Paramount executive, who had signed them to work for the studio. Their hiring caused rifts between Nimoy and Meyer due to the studio not communicating with the two of them over what Konner and Rosenthal's exact role was. Both eventually sat down with the two writers and talked about story ideas they had, which Konner and Rosenthal took extensive notes on. After they produced minimal, if any, usable material and appeared unlikely to make the deadline to start filming, Konner and Rosenthal were let go. They were later able to earn story credit along with Nimoy through the Writers Guild's arbitration process; Nimoy and Meyer allege that Konner and Rosenthal deceived the Guild panel by presenting notes the two had dictated to them as their own original material. (Note: The Guild arbitration was not the only formalized dispute over the film's authorship. A Pennsylvania man filed suit in federal court arguing that the film was based on a 1983 Star Trek spec script he had submitted to Paramount about a Federation-Klingon war. The court granted summary judgement to the studio on the grounds that the two scripts were, beyond concerning relations between the Federation and the Klingons, so different that no reasonable jury could find them substantially similar (the 1983 script had been about the slow escalation of a war between the two rather than peace negotiations).)

Nimoy's hiring of Meyer was not only beneficial because Meyer knew the material and could write quickly—having produced The Wrath of Khan's screenplay in twelve days—but if Meyer was to direct the film it would offset any acrimony from Shatner, whose ire may have been aroused if Nimoy directed a third Star Trek feature. Meyer said that when he started work on the screenplay it did not occur to him that he would direct the film, and his wife was the first person to suggest that he should do the job.

=== Writing ===
Meyer and his friend Denny Martin Flinn wrote the script by the nascent means of e-mail; Meyer lived in Europe while Flinn was based in Los Angeles. The pair worked out a system where Flinn would write all day and then send the draft to Meyer, who would read and make revisions. The script constantly changed because of demands made by the core cast and the supporting players. Flinn was aware that the film would be the last to feature the cast of the original television series, so he wrote an opening that embraced the passage of time. Each of the crew was to be rounded up out of unhappy retirement for one final mission. Flinn recalled that "the scenes demonstrated who [the characters] were and what they did when they weren't on the Enterprise. [...] It added some humanity to the characters. In early drafts, Spock plays Polonius in a Vulcan version of Hamlet, while Sulu drives a taxicab in a crowded metropolis. Another revision featured Captain Sulu bringing his friends out of their retirement. Spock's whereabouts are classified, while Kirk was to have married Carol Marcus (played by Bibi Besch in The Wrath of Khan), leading a settled life before a special envoy arrives at his door. McCoy is drunk at a posh medical dinner; Scott is teaching Engineering while the Bird of Prey from The Voyage Home is pulled from San Francisco Bay; Uhura hosts a call-in radio show and is glad to escape; and Chekov is playing chess at a club. The opening was rejected as too expensive to film; Flinn mentioned the exotic locales would have pushed the budget to $50 million. While they tried to hold on to the opening as long as they could, Paramount threatened to cancel pre-production unless the budget was reduced.

The script was finished by October 1990, five months after Nimoy was approached to write the story. Several months were spent working out the budget; because of the disappointing box office returns of The Final Frontier, Paramount wanted to keep the sixth film's budget approximately the same as the previous installment, although the script called for space battles and new aliens. Shatner, Nimoy, and Kelley's salaries were cut with the understanding that they would share in box office profits. Meyer estimated that almost two months were spent fighting with the studio about money. "To some degree, almost every area of the production was affected by the cuts—but the script was the one thing that did not become a casualty," Meyer said. The original budget hovered around $41 million; while not expensive for a Hollywood production, this would have presented a risk due to Star Trek films' niche audience and lower international appeal. The final budget came in at $30 million.

Star Trek's creator, Gene Roddenberry, who wielded significant influence despite his ill health, hated the script. Meyer's first meeting with Roddenberry resulted in Meyer storming out of the room within five minutes. As with Meyer's previous Star Trek film (The Wrath of Khan), the script had strong military and naval overtones. In contrast to Roddenberry's vision of the future, the characters were shown as bigoted and flawed; Meyer thought there was no evidence that prejudice would disappear by the 23rd century. When Roddenberry protested about the villainization of Saavik, Meyer replied that "I created Saavik. She was not Gene's. If he doesn't like what I plan on doing with her, maybe he should give back the money he's made off my films. Maybe then I'll care what he has to say." After the stormy first meeting, a group including Meyer, Roddenberry, and producer Ralph Winter discussed the revised draft. Roddenberry would voice his disapproval of elements of the script line by line, and he and Meyer would square off about them while Winter took notes. Overall, the tone of the meeting was conciliatory, but the producers ultimately ignored many of Roddenberry's concerns. By February 13, 1991, the film was officially put into production with the agreement it would be in theaters by the end of the year.

=== Design ===
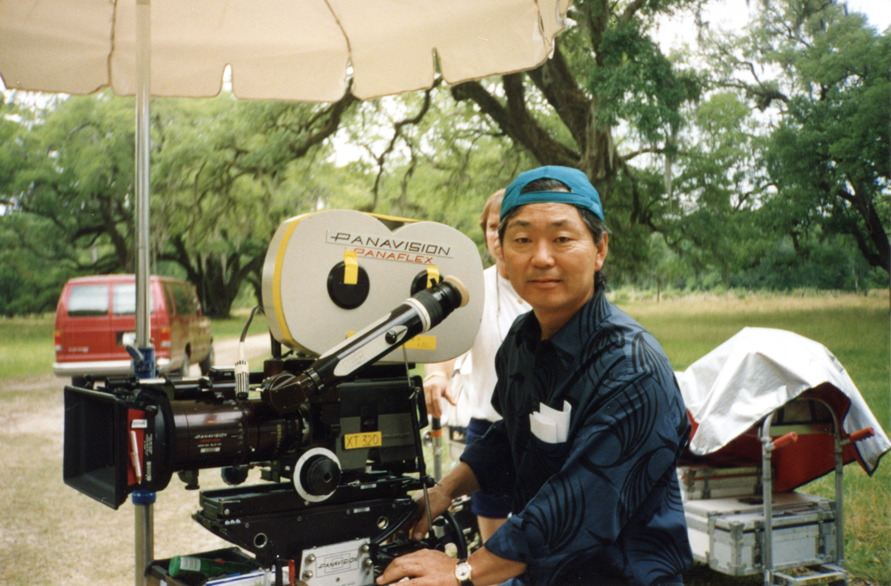
Cinematographer Hiro Narita

As he had when he directed The Wrath of Khan, Meyer attempted to modify the look of Star Trek to fit his vision. Cinematographer Hiro Narita's previous work had been on effects films such as The Rocketeer, where he had time and money to make a lavish period fantasy; with The Undiscovered Country, he was constantly under time and budgetary pressures. Though Narita confessed that he knew nothing about Star Trek, Meyer replied that he did not want him to have any preconceived notions about the look of the series.

Meyer had never been happy with the brightly lit corridors and feel of Enterprise, a dissatisfaction that extended to his work on The Wrath of Khan. For The Undiscovered Country, Meyer wanted the Enterprise interiors to feel grittier and more realistic; the metal was worn around the edges to look used without looking beat up. Wanting to avoid an overly bright, stage look, Narita focused on keeping lighting low and spotty. "By keeping the light down, you see a little less and it becomes more textural," visual effects supervisor Scott Farrar explained. To avoid making the Enterprise look like Klingon vessels, Narita avoided using smoke for atmosphere, instead focusing on high contrast lighting. Meyer acknowledged that had he been the creator of the franchise, "I would have probably designed a much more claustrophobic world because it's much more dramatic." The corridors were reduced in width and included angled bulkhead dividers, with exposed conduits added to the ceiling to convey a claustrophobic feel reminiscent of the submarine film The Hunt for Red October.

Narita's plans to transform the look of the Enterprise were complicated by the budget, which meant many of the Enterprise sets were redresses of those used in Star Trek: The Next Generation. Meyer and production designer Herman Zimmerman were only able to make minor adjustments to these sets, as the television series was still in production at the time of filming. Kirk and Spock's quarters used the same set with the addition of a central column to distinguish them. The set had originally been built as Kirk's quarters for Star Trek: The Motion Picture in 1979, and was being used as Data's room in The Next Generation. The transporter room set was also reused from The Next Generation, with alterations that included the addition of a glowing pattern along the transporter's walls inspired by one of Zimmerman's sweaters. The galley was Deanna Troi's office, the dining hall was the USS Enterprise-D's Observation lounge, and the Federation president's office was a redesign of the Ten-Forward lounge, the exterior doors to which accidentally retained their Enterprise-D markings. Alien costumes in the Rura Penthe prison were reused from The Next Generation's premiere episode, "Encounter at Farpoint". The Excelsior bridge was a redress of Enterprise's command center, with consoles taken from the battle bridge set of the Enterprise-D to convey the impression that the Excelsior was a more advanced ship.

Meyer was insistent that panel labels contain descriptive instructions that might be found on a starship, rather than made-up gibberish, greeking, or gag text. Designer Michael Okuda had finished a schematic of the Enterprise's decks when Nimoy pointed out he had misspelled "reclamation"; while Okuda was fairly certain no one else would notice the single spelling error on the print, he had to fix it. Meyer also made a contentious decision to feature a kitchen in the film, a move that attracted fan controversy. Although the original series mentioned a galley in the episode "Charlie X", only machines able to synthesize food had been shown before.

=== Props and models ===
Paramount made the decision early on to use existing ship models for filming, meaning the old models—some more than a decade old—had to be refurbished, adapted, and reused. Electrical problems had developed in some models that had sat unused. The Klingon cruiser first seen in The Motion Picture was altered to suggest an important flagship, with a flared design applied to the underside of the vessel. Effects supervisor William George wanted to make it distinct from the earlier ships, since it was one of the few models that could be altered: "We did some research into military costuming, and came up with the concept that when these ships return victorious from battle, the Klingons build some sort of epaulet onto their wings or paint a new stripe on." The model was repainted brown and red and etched with brass.

Despite representing a new vessel, the Enterprise-A was the same model that had been used since 1979. Poorly regarded by earlier effects artists because of its complicated wiring and bulk, the Enterprise's hairline cracks were puttied and sanded down, and the internal circuitry was redone. The new model's running lights were matched to similar intensities, saving the effects artists time because the lights would look correct in a single camera pass, instead of the three passes required previously. One unfortunate byproduct of the fixes was the loss of the model's distinctive pearlescent finish. The elaborate sheen was never visible on screen (lighting schemes prevented reflections while filming so the ship could be properly inserted into effects shots) and so when the model was repainted with conventional techniques the effect was lost. The Bird of Prey had been damaged from work in The Voyage Home, where the ship was supposed to fly around the sun. To suggest singes, the model had been painted with black-tinged rubber cement, with the expectation that this application would rub off. The cement instead baked itself to the model surface and had to be scrubbed off.

Greg Jein, the builder of the alien mothership from Close Encounters of the Third Kind, was called on to build props for the film. Jein was a longtime Star Trek fan who had constructed props for The Final Frontier. He added references to the original television series and other science fiction franchises throughout the prop designs; the Rura Penthe warden's staff contained parts of a spaceship from Buck Rogers, while the frong was detailed with a prop from Buckaroo Banzai. Elements from The Final Frontier were modified and reused; a medical implement from the film became Chekov's blood tester, and the assault phasers first seen in The Final Frontier became standard issue. Other props had to be remade as they had disappeared in the time between the two films' production. Gorkon's staff was intended to be a massive bone from an alien creature he had killed, with the designs shaped out of green foam and approved by Meyer. Two copies were strong enough to support David Warner's weight; another two were designed to be light enough to be hung from wires for the zero gravity scenes. Since the Klingon phasers were redesigned for the third film, the original holsters no longer fit the weaponry; as a result, no Klingons had ever been seen drawing a phaser. Meyer was adamant about having the actors be able to unholster their weapons, so the existing pistols had to be redesigned. The Klingon sniper rifle was broken into sections, with parts modeled from real weapons.

=== Makeup ===
The Klingons received the first major revision in design since their appearance in The Motion Picture. Dodie Shepard designed new red and black uniforms for Chancellor Gorkon and his staff, as it was decided the chancellor would not wear common warrior garb. Another concern was that there was not enough of designer Robert Fletcher's The Motion Picture uniforms for all the Klingons in the film. While the important Klingons were given multi-layered prosthetics and unique head ridges, background characters wore ready-made masks, with minor touch-ups on the eyes and mouth. Since it was important for the actors' expressions to be visible through the makeup, the appliances were made as thin as possible using the latest glues and paints. Transforming an actor into a Klingon took three and a half hours. Hairstylist Jan Alexander designed braids and jewelry that suggested a tribal people with a long and treasured heritage.

The diversity of Klingon designs, hairstyles, and appliances for the film stemmed from the fact that there were more Klingons featured than in all the previous films combined. Eighteen unique designs were used for the main characters, with another thirty "A" makeups, forty "B" foam latex makeups, and fifty polyurethane plastic masks for background extras. Makeup artist Richard Snell was in charge of the principal Klingon actors' appliances. The designs for the foreheads came from Snell's own ideas and co-workers, but the actors were allowed input into their character's appearances. Christopher Plummer requested his character's forehead have more subdued spinal ridges than Klingons in previous films, to look unique and to humanize his character. Plummer asked during makeup tests that his character not have a wig, so Chang was given a small amount of hair swept into a warrior's topknot. Snell worked through several nights to redesign the back of Chang's head and add more detail. This design change meant only Plummer's front could be photographed during the first few days of filming while the makeup department created appliances to cover the back of his head. Azetbur, portrayed by Rosanna DeSoto, was initially conceived as having a barbaric appearance, but Meyer insisted on a more refined look. Like Plummer, DeSoto requested more subdued ridges, and the result was, according to artist Kenny Myers, a "very regal woman who just happened to be Klingon."

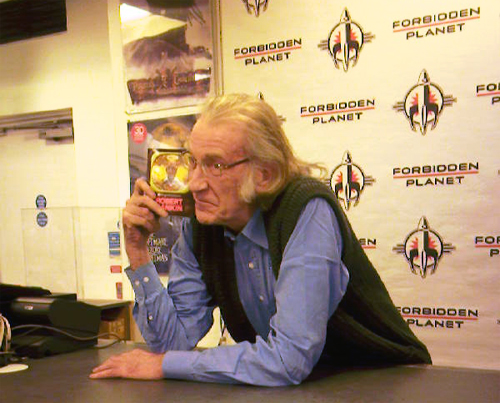
Actor David Warner (above) was given Klingon makeup designed to subtly suggest Melville's Ahab and President Abraham Lincoln.

The design changes forced Kenny Myers to abdicate his other makeup job, that of Warner's Gorkon, to Margaret Bessera. Gorkon's appearance was of special concern to Meyer, who had two specific role models: Ahab and Abraham Lincoln. "[Meyer] loves to play the classics," Kenny Myers explained, "and incorporating these two images was really genius on his part. He wanted there to be uncertainty about Gorkon's true intentions. Did he want peace, or was there something sinister in his mind? From his appearance, it was impossible to tell if he was friend or foe. Subliminally, there were aspects of both."

Along with Klingon cosmetics, makeup supervisor Michael J. Mills was kept busy preparing the large number of other aliens called for in the script. Mills and his team created the largest makeup endeavor ever seen in a Star Trek film until then; custom makeup was applied to 22 principal actors, and as many as 126 prosthetic makeups each day. Because the alien creatures played such an important role in the film, there was a concerted push to provide enough money to the makeup department to make sure the complex work was finished. According to Mills, "[if] we could prove to [Ralph Winter] that we needed something to get the shot done, then we'd have it." The makeup lab employed a staff of 25 and produced over 300 prosthetics, from Klingon foreheads to Vulcan and Romulan ears. Work on the many extras began as early as one o'clock in the morning to be ready for the eight o'clock call.

The large, hulking form the shapeshifter Martia assumes while on the surface of Rura Penthe was dubbed "The Brute" by the production team. The creature's Yeti-like appearance was based on a Smithsonian cover of a marmoset. Also created for the Rura Penthe shoot was a frozen Klingon with a horrified expression. Makeup artist Ed French found a spare Klingon headpiece in Richard Snell's possession and attached it to his own head. A cast of his tortured expression was used as the foundation for the dummy used on location. The designers used striking colors and new techniques for some of the aliens, with ultraviolet pigments used to create the hostile alien that fights Kirk in Rura Penthe.

As it was intended to be Nimoy's last portrayal of Spock, the actor was adamant that his appearance be faithful to the original 1960s Fred Phillips and Charlie Schram design of the character. Mills consulted photos from the original television series as reference, and created five ear sculptings before Nimoy was satisfied. The result was tall ears with the tips pointing forward—considerably different from Snell's swept-back look for The Voyage Home. The character of Valeris was designed to be more ivory-hued than Spock's yellow tone, with sleeker eyebrows and a severe haircut favored by Meyer. "We went to great pains to establish that this is the way a Vulcan woman—a sexy Vulcan woman—would look," said Mills.

=== Filming ===
Principal photography took place between April 16 and September 27, 1991. The film was shot in Super 35 instead of anamorphic format, because of the former's greater flexibility in framing and lens selection, larger depth of field, and faster lenses. Because of budget cuts, plans for filming were constantly revised and reduced, but Meyer and Zimmerman agreed that the constraints proved inspiring.

The film used a mix of fixed sets and on-location footage. The production suffered from a lack of available set space; the Starfleet Headquarters set was actually built a few blocks away from Paramount Pictures at the Hollywood Presbyterian Church. Meyer copied a technique used during filming of Citizen Kane, where the filmmakers let the set fall into darkness to save money on construction.

The dinner scene was shot in a revamped version of the Enterprise-D's observation lounge. Along the wall are portraits of historical figures including Abraham Lincoln, Spock's father Sarek (Mark Lenard), and an unnamed Andorian ambassador. The food prepared for the scene was colored blue so it would look alien. None of the actors wanted to eat the unappetizing dishes sitting under hot studio lights. Because of the multiple angles and takes required for a single mouthful of food, Meyer offered a bounty of $20 per every shot of a character eating. For Shatner, the incentive was enough that he became the only cast member to consume purple-dyed squid. The shoot lasted several days because of what Plummer called the "horror" of filming the dinner.

The Klingon courtroom where Kirk and McCoy are sentenced was designed like an arena, with high walls and a central platform for the accused. Originally planned for construction on the largest soundstage, cutbacks forced a smaller set to be constructed. Sixty-six Klingons were used for the scene, with six actors in custom makeups and an additional fifteen in "A-level" makeup; the high quality designs were used for the Klingons in the first row of the stands, while those actors to the rear used masks. The illusion of endless rows of Klingons was created by brightly lighting the accused in the center of the room with a blue light, then letting the rest of the set fall into shadow. To give the set a larger appearance, a shot from high above the courtroom was created using miniatures. Inspired by a scene in Ben-Hur, matte supervisor Craig Barron used two hundred commercially available Worf dolls sent by Ralph Winter. The illusion of throngs of angry Klingons was created by rocking the dolls back and forth with motors, waving sticks lit by twelve-volt light bulbs dyed red. The resulting courtroom miniature was 10 feet (3.0 m) long.

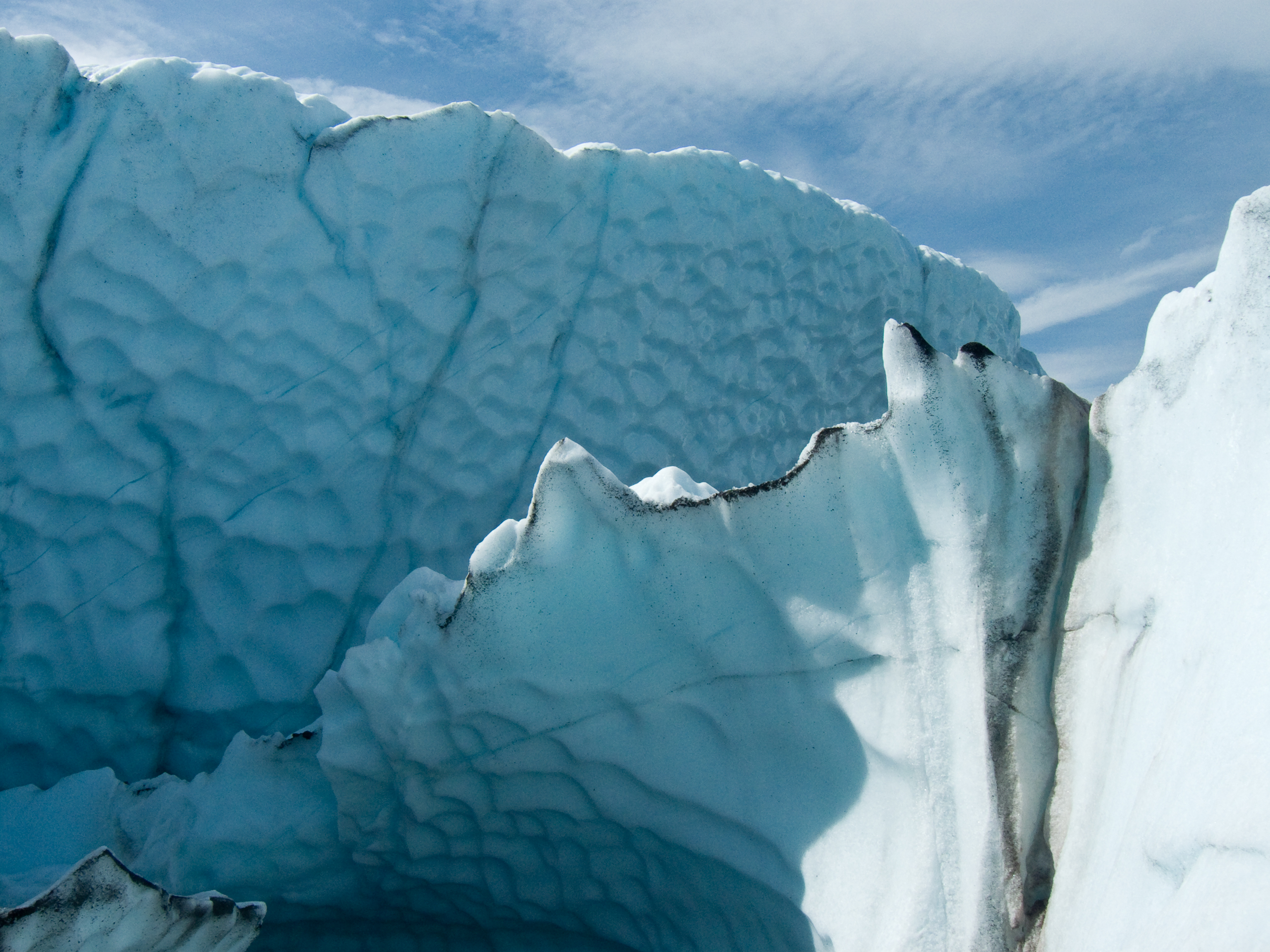
Glaciers to the east of Anchorage like this one were used to provide dramatic scope to Kirk and McCoy's escape.

Flinn conceived the penal colony Rura Penthe as on an arid, undeveloped world, but Meyer suggested that it be turned into an ice world instead. The exterior shots of Martia, Kirk, and McCoy traveling across the frozen wastes were filmed on top of a glacier in Alaska, east of Anchorage. Because of budget and time constraints, the second unit was tasked with getting the footage. The location was accessible only by helicopter, and was scouted months before filming began. The main problem the crew faced was the cold, with temperatures during shooting dropping to −50 °F (−46 °C). The stuntmen, dressed in woolen costumes, were in danger of catching pneumonia. Ice caverns producer Jaffe had scouted partially melted before filming; with only two-and-a-third days of time to film, the crew had to do the best they could. Batteries drained after minutes of filming in the cold, and the lack of snow was compensated by dropping fake precipitation into the scene by helicopter.

Scenes featuring the main characters at Rura Penthe were filmed on a soundstage. Creating a fake blizzard was challenging; two types of plastic snow were mixed together to provide flakes and powdery accumulation. Massive fans blew snow that, according to Shatner, got into "every orifice", as well as the camera. Camera magazines were changed off the stage so that there was no chance the snow could get into the film; crewmembers found the snow in their socks for weeks afterwards.

The underground prison was shot in real caves left by mining at Griffith Park, in the Bronson Canyon, previously used as the Batcave and in the 1930s Flash Gordon serial. Shots of the interior of the mine were captured at night so it appeared like the setting was underground. Since Narita and his crew were not allowed to drill holes for lights in the mine shafts, illumination had to come from practical lights that appeared to be part of the set. The elevator descent into the bowels of the mine was simulated by pasting fake rocks to a canvas being cranked in the background of the scene. While Zimmerman believed Shatner would hate the fight between Kirk and his doppelgänger, the actor enjoyed the theatrical sequence, and contributed to the choreography with his knowledge of judo and karate.

The battle above Khitomer was one of the last sequences to be shot, which proved fortuitous as the Enterprise bridge was damaged by the simulated sparks and explosions. The officer's mess set was blown up for a sequence where the Enterprise's hull is compromised by a torpedo. When the set was rebuilt for use on The Next Generation, the forward wall was redesigned. While the Khitomer conference interior and exteriors were filmed at the Brandeis-Bardin Institute in California, the window from which Colonel West prepares to assassinate the president was a separate set built at Paramount. Footage from Brandeis, matte paintings, and the backlot were combined to create an open outdoor view.

The division of labor for shooting the starship models was decided early on by effects cameramen Peter Daulton and Pat Sweeney. There was an equal amount of work if one crew did all the Enterprise shots and another did the Bird of Prey, Klingon cruiser and Excelsior shots, so the cameramen flipped to decide who worked on which models. Old and new techniques were applied to shooting the models. To make sure the vessels were seamlessly inserted into star fields in post-production, the crew filmed second passes in overexposed yellow light, which reduced light spillage onto the bluescreen backdrop. The yellow overcast was removed by filtration in the optical process, with the result being a clean edge around the ships. Because Paramount continued to add new shots to the busy schedule and tight budget, some elements were flipped for reuse, including the star fields and a shot of the Bird of Prey firing. Whenever possible, the ships were filmed from below to reinforce the nautical theme, with their movements intended to remind the audience of galleons or other large seafaring vessels.

The approach to Spacedock was filmed from below the station model, which Bill George found visually interesting and appropriate. He felt that the tracking of a shuttle from the planet evoked 2001: A Space Odyssey. The shuttle used in the scene was the only new model created for the film. It measured twelve inches and was fabricated in less than a week. The shot of the Enterprise leaving Spacedock was difficult to produce because the interior dock miniature had disappeared. Stock footage from The Voyage Home was used for one shot to compensate. Since the only other shot needed was the Enterprise's point of view leaving Spacedock through the doors, it was the only section recreated for the film.

The last scene in the film was arranged for the last day of filming. Initially, the language was supposed to be more somber and classical, but Meyer made some last minute changes. Flinn said that Meyer "was in an optimistic mood", and the director suggested that Kirk quote Peter Pan for the last lines: "Second star to the right, and straight on till morning." Emotions ran high as the last shots of the cast were captured; Shatner said, "By the time we finished the last scene, which extended longer than we expected, there was a sense of irritation. We raised a glass of champagne, but everybody was actually a little antsy."

=== Effects ===
The majority of the visual effects were created by Industrial Light & Magic (ILM) under the supervision of Scott Farrar, who previously served as visual effects cameraman on the first three Star Trek films. After receiving the script, ILM created storyboards for the effects sequences before meeting Meyer and producers Winter and Steven-Charles Jaffe to discuss the planned scenes. These discussions began before the film was greenlit. ILM's initial cost estimates were over Paramount's budget, so to save money the filmmakers redesigned some shots and outsourced some to other companies. Elements of the zero gravity scenes were handled by Pacific Data Images, while phaser beams and transporter effects were generated by Visual Concept Engineering, an offshoot of ILM that had contributed to The Wrath of Khan and The Final Frontier. Despite the overall count of effects shots being dropped from over 100 to 51, the project was still large, and required virtually the entire ILM staff to complete. Farrar's goal was to economize the remaining effects, trying to tell the story with as few shots as possible. Cheap animatics provided Meyer with placeholders to cut into the film and avoid costly surprises. Stock footage from previous films was used whenever possible, but it was often unfeasible to do so; as the original USS Enterprise had been destroyed in The Search for Spock, all shots of the USS Enterprise-A had to feature the updated ship registry.

ILM's computer graphics division was responsible for creating three sequences, including the explosion of Praxis. Meyer's idea for the effect was influenced by The Poseidon Adventure; Farrar used imagery of an immense wave hitting the Poseidon to inform the scale of their shock wave. The department built on a lens flare simulation to create a plasma burst composed of two expanding disc shapes with swirling detail texture mapped to the surface. Farrar settled on the preliminary look of the wave, and graphics supervisor Jay Riddle used Adobe Photoshop on a Macintosh to establish the final color scheme. Initially the team thought they would be able to use the same methods to create the wave that hits the Excelsior, but found that it did not convey the scale of the wave—in Riddle's words, "this thing had to look really enormous." The final shot was created by manipulating two curved pieces of computer geometry, expanding them as they approached the camera's view. Textures that changed every frame were added on top of the wave to give the impression of great speed. Motion control footage of the Excelsior was then scanned into the computer and made to interact with the digital wave. ILM's ring-shaped "Praxis Effect" shockwave became a common feature in science fiction films depicting the destruction of large objects, while astronomer Philip Plait assumed that in reality a spherical wave would be more likely.

Meyer came upon the idea of having assassins kill a weightless Gorkon after searching for a novel way to "blow away" the character in space that had not been seen before. The final sequence married physical effects and stuntwork with computer graphics. Responsibility for shooting the live action footage fell to the second unit under Jaffe's direction. While the sequence read well on paper, there was not enough time or money to do the effects "the right way"—for example, shooting the actors on a bluescreen and then inserting them into the Klingon corridors. Jaffe noted that the low-tech method of suspending actors by wires helped the final effect, because as photographed by John Fante, few wires had to be removed digitally in post-production; sets were constructed so that the harsh lighting obscured wires, and entire sets were constructed on their sides so that by pulling actors up and down on the rotated sets, the characters appeared to float sideways. These sets were on gimbals so that the movement of the actors and sets created a floating effect. The shot of two Klingons killed and thrown back down a corridor by phaser blasts was simulated by positioning the camera at the bottom of a corridor set. The set was placed on its end in the tallest soundstage at Paramount, so that the camera looked up towards the ceiling. In this position, the wires were hidden by the actors as they ascended the corridor.

A "weightless" Klingon is thrown back into a bulkhead, spurting violet blood. In reality, the sets were rotated 90 degrees to give the illusion of the actor floating horizontally; the digitally animated blood globules were added in post-production.

The blood that spurts out of the Klingon's wounds was created using computer generated imagery; the animators had to make sure that the blood floated in a convincing manner while still looking interesting and not too gory. The effects artist looked at NASA footage of floating globules of water to inform the physics of the blood particles. Initially, the blood was to be colored green, but the filmmakers realized that McCoy had referred to Spock as green-blooded. The final color was violet, a color Meyer disliked but went ahead with as red blood would almost certainly earn the film an R rating from the MPAA. The initial killing of the Klingon in the transporter room as the assassins beam aboard was the testing ground for tweaking the color of the blood and how it would move around the room. Most of the blood droplets were "blobbies", groups of spheres smoothed together by computer, creating a continuous shape. The further apart the spheres, the more the shape could stretch and even break apart. The phasers used in the scene and throughout the film were redesigned versions of earlier models and were first used in The Final Frontier. The props featured blue lights that turned on when the trigger was pressed, so Visual Concepts Engineering's artists knew when to add the phaser beam effects. The ILM team matched the phaser blasts with hand-painted effects in Photoshop. ILM did minor touchup to the scenes as required, adding clothing tears where the phaser blasts hit the actors and adding the hazy Klingon atmosphere to the computer-rendered objects. These zero gravity scenes were the most expensive sequences to complete.

Rura Penthe was created with a mixture of on-set and location shots, along with an establishing sequence created by Matte World. The characters were shot on a San Francisco beach, with a white plastic underfoot. Sun elements were layered onto the shot along with a double-exposed snow effect. Additional passes were made on fiberfill clouds with lights behind them to create a distant lightning storm.

Martia was not the first shapeshifter on Star Trek, but the character was the first to be created using computer-generated digital morphing technology. The effects, dubbed "morfs", were more advanced revisions of the technology used for films such as Terminator 2: Judgment Day. Animator John Berton attempted new, more complicated morfs, including moving the camera and morphing two characters talking; special care had to be taken to line up the characters properly in plate photography. Martia becomes Kirk while talking, requiring similar line deliveries from Iman and Shatner; Farrar supervised the set photography for the morfs and had the actors speak their lines in sync via a loudspeaker.

Kirk's fight scene with Martia in the form of Kirk was mostly filmed with a double dressed in similar clothes; in the majority of the shots the camera allowed only one of the combatants' faces to be seen. When Kirk talked with his double directly, two separate takes of Shatner facing opposite directions were combined, with the camera motion carefully controlled so that the resulting image looked realistic.

For the final space battle, Bill George redesigned the photon torpedoes to have a hotter core and larger flare, because he felt that the weapons in earlier films looked "too pretty". The torpedoes moved like guided missiles rather than cannonballs. George told Farrar that he had always wanted to see something penetrate the thin saucer section of the Enterprise, so a replica of the saucer was recreated and blown up; the model was hung upside down so that the explosion could be flipped to approximate the zero gravity effects. Rather than destroy the Bird of Prey model in the climax, pyrotechnic footage was reduced and placed in the appropriate locations to simulate rippling explosions throughout the vessel. A special "pyro model" was created from a rubber cast of the Bird of Prey and exploded instead, with a lap dissolve making the transition from the motion control ship to the pyro vessel. ILM knew that there was already footage of Chang reacting to the torpedo hit but that Meyer was unhappy with the result. Using footage of Plummer as reference, the effects team created a dummy that was detonated in the same position. Steve Jaffe said, "[Editor] Ron Roose and I pored through the footage to find what amounted to three usable frames that we could use to tell the audience 'we got him!'"

=== Music ===
Meyer's original plan for the score was to adapt Gustav Holst's orchestral suite The Planets. This idea proved too expensive, and with both James Horner (composer for The Wrath of Khan and The Search for Spock) and Jerry Goldsmith (composer for The Motion Picture and The Final Frontier) turning the film down, Meyer began listening to demo tapes submitted by other composers. Meyer described most of the demos as generic "movie music", but was intrigued by one tape by a young composer named Cliff Eidelman. Eidelman, then 26, had made a career composing for ballets, television, and film, but despite work on fourteen features, no film had been the hit needed to propel Eidelman to greater fame.

In conversations with Eidelman, Meyer mentioned that since the marches that accompanied the main titles for the previous Star Trek films were so good, he had no desire to compete with them by composing a bombastic opening. He felt that since the film was darker than its predecessors, it demanded something different musically as a result. He mentioned the opening to Igor Stravinsky's The Firebird as similar to the foreboding sound he wanted. Two days later Eidelman produced a tape of his idea for the main theme, played on a synthesizer. Meyer was impressed by the speed of the work and the close fit to his vision. Meyer approached producer Steven Charles-Jaffe with Eidelman's CD, which reminded Jaffe of Bernard Herrmann; Eidelman was subsequently given the task of composing the score.

Eidelman began the project by creating a compilation of music from the past five Star Trek films, and he consciously avoided taking inspiration from those scores. "[The compilation] showed me what to stay away from, because I couldn't do James Horner as well as James Horner," he said. Since he was hired early on in production, Eidelman had an unusually long time to develop his ideas, and he was able to visit the sets during filming. While the film was in early production Eidelman worked on electronic drafts of the final score, to placate executives who were unsure about using a relatively unknown composer.

Eidelman stated that he finds science fiction the most interesting and exciting genre to compose for, and that Meyer told him to treat the film as a fresh start, rather than drawing on old Star Trek themes. Eidelman wanted the music to aid the visuals; for Rura Penthe, he strove to create an atmosphere that reflected the alien and dangerous setting, introducing exotic instruments for color. Besides using percussion from around the world, Eidelman treated the choir as percussion, with the Klingon language translation for "to be, or not to be" ("taH pagh, taHbe") being repeated in the background. Spock's theme was designed to be an ethereal counterpart to the motif for Kirk and the Enterprise, aimed at capturing "the emotional gleam in the captain's eye". Kirk's internal dilemma about what the future holds was echoed in the main theme: "It's Kirk taking control one last time and as he looks out into the stars he has the spark again [...] But there's an unresolved note, because it's very important that he doesn't trust the Klingons. He doesn't want to go on this trip even though the spark is there that overtook him." For the climactic battle, Eidelman starts the music quietly, building the intensity as the battle progresses.

The soundtrack was released on December 10, 1991, through MCA Records and features thirteen tracks of score with a running time of forty-five minutes. In 2005, a bootleg copy of the soundtrack surfaced with thirty-six tracks of score and a running time of nearly seventy minutes. Intrada Records released a two-disc set in 2012. The first disc is made up of the complete score and four extra cues. The second disc contains the material from the original MCA release.

== Themes and analysis ==
The Undiscovered Country's Cold War allegory and references to literary history were recognized among researchers and cultural historians. Scholars have noted that it is the Klingons, not the humans, who quote William Shakespeare; Gorkon claims at one point in the film that "You have not experienced Shakespeare until you have read him in the original Klingon." In reality, the reverse—translating Shakespeare into Klingon—proved problematic because Marc Okrand had not created a verb for "to be" when he developed the language. Shakespeare scholar Paul A. Cantor argues that this association is appropriate—the warlike Klingons find their literary matches in the characters Othello, Mark Antony, and Macbeth—but that it reinforces a claim that the end of the Cold War means the end of heroic literature such as Shakespeare's. According to Kay Smith, the use of Shakespeare has meaning in itself and also derives new meaning (underscoring cultural politics in the film) by its rearticulation in a new form. Meyer said the idea for having the Klingons claim Shakespeare as their own was based on Nazi Germany's attempt to claim the Bard as German before World War II.

According to scholar Larry Kreitzer, The Undiscovered Country has more references to Shakespeare than any other Star Trek work until at least 1996. The title itself alludes to Hamlet, Act III, Scene 1, the famous "To be, or not to be" soliloquy. Meyer had originally intended The Wrath of Khan to be called The Undiscovered Country. Whereas the undiscovered country referred to in Hamlet (and its intended meaning in The Wrath of Khan) is death, Star Trek VI's use of the phrase refers to a future where Klingons and humans coexist in peace.

Chang recites most of the lines from Shakespeare used in the film, including quotes from Romeo and Juliet and Henry IV, Part 2 in his parting words to Kirk after dinner. During Kirk's trial, Chang mocks Kirk with lines from Richard II. The final battle above Khitomer contains seven references to five of Shakespeare's plays. Two references are drawn from the title character's lines in Henry V ("Once more unto the breach"/"The game's afoot"), while two more quotations are from Julius Caesar ("I am as constant as the Northern Star"/"Cry 'havoc!' and let slip the dogs of war"). There is a single reference to Prospero from The Tempest ("Our revels now are ended"), and Chang shortens the wronged Shylock's speech from The Merchant of Venice: "Tickle us, do we not laugh; prick us, do we not bleed; and wrong us, shall we not revenge?" The final line spoken by Chang before he is obliterated by torpedo fire is lifted from Hamlet's famous soliloquy: "to be, or not to be..." Flinn was initially unsure about the numerous classical quotations, but when Plummer was cast, Meyer enthusiastically added more. He said, "Whether it's pretentious or not, I think it depends on how it's used. [...] I don't quite agree with using too much of that sort of thing, but once you get Plummer, suddenly it's working."

In addition to Shakespeare, Meyer's script includes references to Arthur Conan Doyle. "The game's afoot", originally from Shakespeare's Henry V, is spoken by Sherlock Holmes to Dr. Watson in a short story by Doyle. As the Enterprise crew works to identify Gorkon's assassins, acting Captain Spock invokes "an ancestor of mine" who maintained that when the impossible is eliminated, what remains must be true, no matter how unlikely it is. This statement was made by Holmes in several works by Doyle; Meyer, too, has written Holmes novels, and has acknowledged the link.

The association of General Chang with the politics of the Munich Agreement that involved attempted appeasement of Nazi Germany are brought up twice in the film. The first is with Chang with other Klingon officials at a dinner with Kirk and Federation officers, where Chang declares that the Klingon Empire needs "breathing room", to which Kirk responds by imitating Spock's earlier quoting of Hamlet, saying that Chang's reference is "Earth, Hitler, 1938". Later when Kirk confronts Chang's warship, Chang mocks the historic British Prime Minister Neville Chamberlain who attempted to appease Hitler; with Chang saying that there will be "no peace in our time".

A major theme of the film is change, and people's response to that change. Meyer considered Valeris and Chang "frightened people, who are frightened of change", who cling to old ways despite the changing world. He hoped that the fictionalization of a current events story allowed for an objective look at the issues, rather than being blinded by prejudice. At the beginning of the film, Kirk operates under a similar prejudice, calling the Klingons "animals" and putting him at odds with Spock. The Vulcan sees the Gorkon peace initiative as logical, responding to the sudden change in the status quo in a collected manner; he even opens the peace dialog at the behest of his father. Kirk, meanwhile, is willing to "let them (the Klingons) die", unwilling to listen to Spock's words because of his prejudice. Kirk undergoes a transformation through the film by way of his incarceration; realizing that his hatred is outmoded he allows for a cleansing that restores his son to him in some way.

While Star Trek in general features few overt references to religion, there is a clear recognition that a laying aside of past hurts is necessary for peace, similar to the concept of shalom in Judaism. Shatner regretted that Kirk's angst at being outmoded was minimized in the final print. A scene where Spock asks Kirk if they have grown so old and inflexible they have outlived their usefulness had two meanings: it was as much Nimoy asking Shatner as it was their characters.

== Reception ==
=== Release ===
The Undiscovered Country was released in North America on December 6, 1991. The film was initially planned for release a week later on December 13. To promote the film and the 25th anniversary of Star Trek, Paramount held marathon screenings of the previous five films in 44 select U.S. and Canadian cities. The 12-hour showings included footage of The Undiscovered Country. The day before the film's release, the core cast was inducted into Grauman's Chinese Theatre, and signed their names on Hollywood Boulevard. Nimoy, who had earlier requested $1 million to cameo on The Next Generation, appeared in the two-part episode "Unification" that aired during November 1991 to increase interest in the feature film. The previous five films were released in collectors' box sets with new packaging; retailers were offered the chance to photograph their retail setups for a chance to win an expenses-paid tour of The Next Generation's set and tickets to an advance screening of The Undiscovered Country.

Roddenberry did not live to see the film's release, dying of heart failure on October 24, 1991. Before the film's release he viewed a near-final version of The Undiscovered Country, and according to the film's producer and Kelley's biographer, approved a final version of the film. In contrast, Nimoy and Shatner's memoirs report that after the screening he called his lawyer and demanded a quarter of the scenes be cut; the producers refused, and within 48 hours he was dead. Paramount considered spending close to $240,000 to send Roddenberry's ashes into space—a move that had the backing of fans—but decided against it; his remains would make it into space along with 22 others in 1997. The film's opening included a note to Roddenberry's memory; at early showings, the crowds of Star Trek fans applauded loudly. While the producers had begun work on the film anticipating it as the last film, by the premiere it was obvious the film would make money and that a Star Trek VII would soon be in the works. The cast was split on the possibility of a sequel; Shatner, Nimoy, and Kelley said that the film would be their last, while the supporting cast strongly lobbied for another film. The consensus was for the next film to star the cast of The Next Generation. The seventh Star Trek feature, Star Trek Generations (1994), would blend the old and new casts.

The Undiscovered Country opened in 1,804 theaters in North America and grossed $18,162,837 in its opening weekend; the showing was a record for the film series and was the top-grossing film of the weekend. The film grossed $74,888,996 in North America, for a total of $96,888,996 worldwide. The Undiscovered Country's strong showing was one of the big successes of 1991, a year in which the film industry experienced disappointing box office results overall. The film was nominated in the Sound effects editing and Makeup categories at the 64th Academy Awards. The film won a Saturn Award for best science fiction film, making it the only Star Trek film to win the award. The film's novelization by J.M. Dillard was a commercial success, reaching the Publishers Weekly mass market paperback bestsellers list.

=== Critical response ===
The Undiscovered Country received a much kinder reception from reviewers and audiences than The Final Frontier. Critics approved of the blend of humor and adventure in the film. Audiences surveyed by CinemaScore gave the film a grade "A−" on scale of A to F. Review aggregator Rotten Tomatoes reports an approval rating of 84% based on 61 reviews.

The Herald Sun reported that "those who found The Final Frontier weighed down by emotional gravity and over-the-top spiritualism [welcomed] the follow-up with its suspense, action and subtle good humor." The dialogue and banter were considered positive and defining aspects of the film. Janet Maslin of The New York Times said that "Star Trek VI is definitely colorful, but even more of its color comes from conversation, which can take some amusingly florid turns." Critic Hal Hinson commented that Meyer "[is] capable of sending up his material without cheapening it or disrupting our belief in the reality of his yarn," and called the one-liners an organic part of the film's "jocular, tongue-in-cheek spirit". Susan Wloszczyna of USA Today said that with Meyer directing, "this last mission gets almost everything right—from the nod to late creator Gene Roddenberry to in-jokes about Kirk's rep as an alien babe magnet."

Views on the acting of the main cast were varied. Lloyd Miller of the St. Petersburg Times said the characters "return to their original roles with a vigor and wit unseen in earlier episodes of the film series". Rob Salem of The Toronto Star quipped that though the actors looked silly on occasion, this was a benefit; "as their capacity for action has diminished, their comedic talents have blossomed [...] they have all become masters of self-deprecating self-parody." The Boston Globe's Matthew Gilbert called the actors' performances "photocopies" of previous films: "Shatner and Nimoy are respectable, but lack energy. There's nowhere else to go with their roles, and they know it. DeForest Kelley is oddly out of it." Plummer and Warner's portrayals of their Klingon characters were well-received; Maslin commented that "whenever a skilled actor [...] manages to emerge from behind all this [makeup] with his personality intact, it's a notable accomplishment." The other supporting characters received similar praise; H. J. Kirchhoff, writing for The Globe and Mail, said that the guest stars joined the "family fun" of the film as "zesty, exotic and colorful good guys and bad guys". A Cinefantastique retrospective review considered the film to have the finest guest stars ever assembled for a Star Trek film.

The Cold War allegory and the whodunit aspects of the film were less positively received. Mary Boson of the Sydney Morning Herald considered the comparisons to real-world situations timely, and praised the plot for exploring the reactions of those who have invested themselves in a life of belligerence. David Sterritt of The Christian Science Monitor felt that the film veered away from the intriguing Cold War allegory premise to unsatisfying results. Instead of maintaining suspense, The Washington Times's Gary Arnold noted the Rura Penthe sideplot offered "scenic distraction without contributing significantly to the whodunit crisis [...] The crime itself has a promising 'closed-room' aspect that never gets elaborated adequately [...] You look forward to a cleverly fabricated solution." Arnold felt that instead of developing this mystery, the filmmakers defused the potential for suspense by shifting away from the search of the Enterprise. Brian Lowry of Variety felt Rura Penthe dragged down the film's pace, and that Meyer paid so much attention to one-liners that there was a lack of tension in the film, a complaint echoed by John Hartl of The Seattle Times.

The special effects were alternately lauded and criticized; USA Today called them "just serviceable", though Wloszczyna's review for the paper said the Klingon assassination sequence was "dazzling", with "fuchsia blood spilling out in Dalí-esque blobs". Desson Howe, writing for The Washington Post's Weekend section, said that "the Klingons' spilled blood floats in the air in eerily beautiful purplish globules; it's space-age Sam Peckinpah." Maslin considered some effects garish, but appreciated the filmmakers' tirelessness "in trying to make their otherworldly characters look strange".

=== Home media ===
The Undiscovered Country was released on VHS and in widescreen and full screen formats on LaserDisc in June 1992; the release added a few minutes of new footage to the film. Because of a trend in supermarket video sales and rentals, Paramount offered rebates for the home video release of The Undiscovered Country through boxes of Kellogg's Frosted Mini-Wheats. The LaserDisc version of the film was the tenth highest-selling video during 1992. The home video cut was later released for the film's 1999 DVD debut.

As with the other nine Star Trek films, The Undiscovered Country was re-released on DVD as a Special Edition in 2004. Meyer, who stated he dislikes director's cuts, nevertheless found "a couple of moments that I thought were not clear", and re-edited them as "I suddenly saw how to make them clear." Among the elements added for home video were a briefing with the Federation president where Admiral Cartwright and Colonel West unveil their plan for rescuing Kirk and McCoy, and a scene where Spock and Scott inspect the torpedoes. Some shots were reordered or replaced, with wide-angle shots replacing close angles and vice versa. The special features included a commentary track with Meyer and Flinn, featurettes detailing the special effects, production, and historical inspiration of the film, and a tribute to actor DeForest Kelley.

The film's original theatrical cut was released on Blu-ray Disc in May 2009 to coincide with the new Star Trek feature, along with the other five films featuring the original crew in Star Trek: Original Motion Picture Collection. The Undiscovered Country was remastered in 1080p high-definition from the 1999 DVD transfer. The film, like the others in the set, features 7.1 Dolby TrueHD audio. The disc contains a new commentary track by Star Trek screenwriting veterans Larry Nemecek and Ira Steven Behr. A 4K release with both versions of the film was released in 2022.

== See also ==
- Chernobyl disaster
- Nixon goes to China
- Flashback, the 1996 Star Trek: Voyager episode that includes scenes that take place during the opening events of the film.
