= Nixon goes to China =

Political metaphor

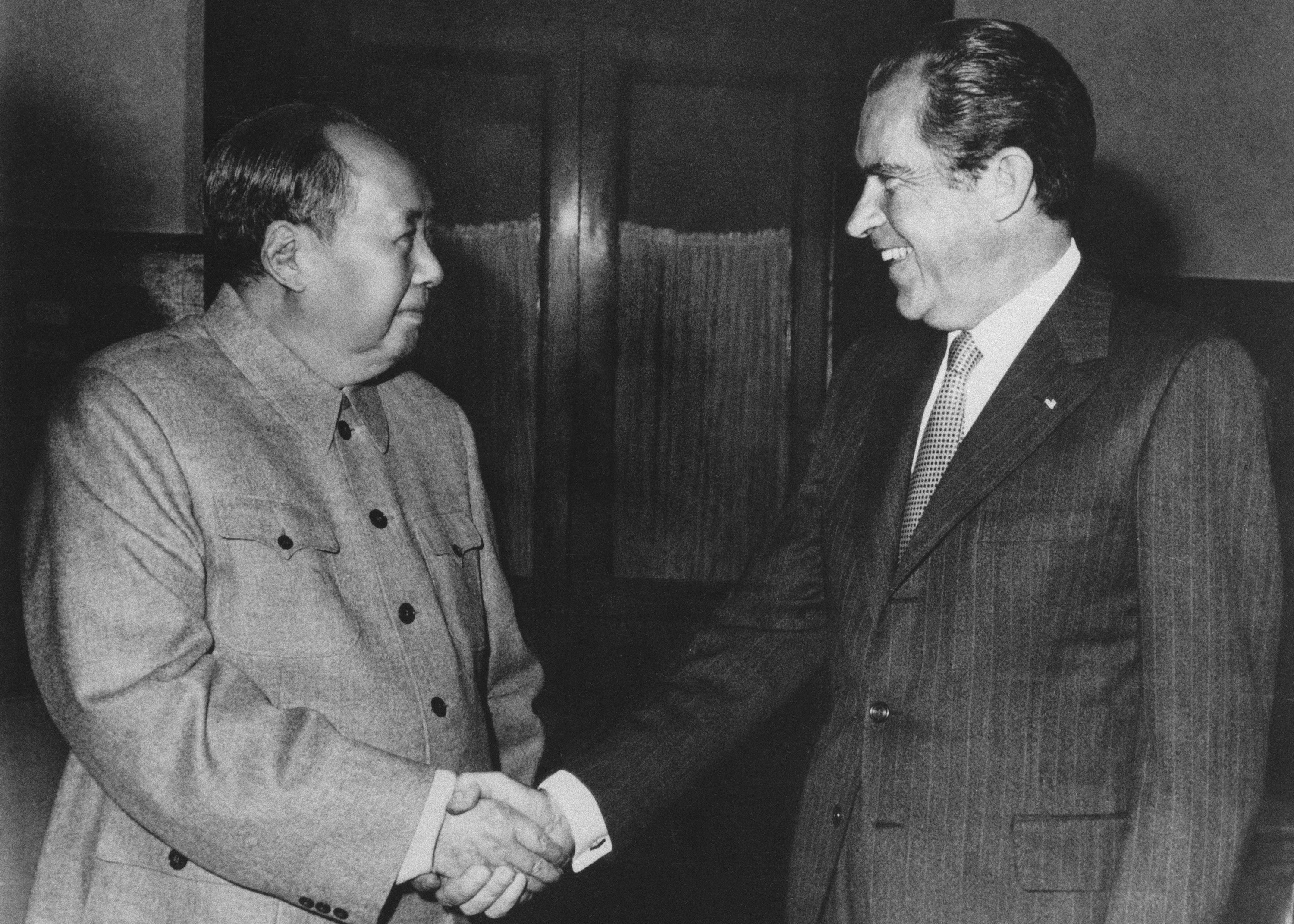
President Richard Nixon shakes hands with Chinese leader Mao Zedong.

The phrase "Nixon goes to China", "Nixon to China", or "Nixon in China" is a historical reference to U.S. president Richard Nixon's 1972 visit to the People's Republic of China, where he met with Chinese Communist Party chairman Mao Zedong. Its basic import is that Nixon's well-established reputation as an anti-Communist "hawk" gave him political cover against domestic criticism for a move that might have been portrayed as conciliating a geopolitical rival. The metaphor is often expressed as the observation "Only Nixon could go to China" or "It took Nixon to go to China".

== Context ==
The phrase had originated before Nixon's actual visit to China. An early use of the phrase is found in a December 1971 U.S. News & World Report interview with US Senate Democratic Leader Mike Mansfield in a section summary lead that read, "'Only a 'Nixon' Could Go to China." The actual quote from Mansfield, which he prefaces by noting he had heard it said earlier, was "Only a Republican, perhaps only a Nixon, could have made this break and gotten away with it." Nixon had developed an extensive record of opposing communism from his early days in the House of Representatives, including serving on the House Un-American Activities Committee, sponsoring the Mundt–Nixon Bill to require Communist Party members to register with the government, and personally spearheading the prosecution of alleged Soviet spy Alger Hiss.

When he met President Nixon, Chairman Mao also joked that "I voted for you during your last election." Nixon laughed and said "you voted for the lesser of two evils", and Mao replied, "I like rightists, I am comparatively happy when these people on the right come into power."

== Outcome ==
Nixon's visit to China and Shanghai Communiqué was of particular significance because it marked the beginning of a thaw in China–United States relations.

Internationally, Nixon's visit played a role in leading to the September 1972 Japan–China Joint Communiqué between Mao Zedong and Kakuei Tanaka. During the negotiation, Mao also stated that he preferred the "rightist" party in Japan as well as the United States.

== In politics, economics and history ==
The Nixon going to China phenomenon has also been compared to a more generic spectrum of left-wing and right-wing policies, and a proposed "Nixon paradox" describing which policies are difficult to implement based on a politician's declared values (left or right primarily). Two theoretical economic models suggest that these surprising policy initiatives can politically benefit the policy initiator. Assuming that politicians who are in power have superior information concerning the effects of policies, if new information is obtained supporting a right-wing shift in policy, a left-wing politician can more credibly signal that the policy is an appropriate course of action than a right-wing politician, because ‘‘voters will infer that the left-wing politician is motivated by objective facts, rather than his party’s natural ideological tendencies’’. This phenomenon was empirically supported in two experiments conducted in Germany and Israel. Politicians who adopt policies that are incongruent with their policy reputation enjoy a more favorable public reaction.

=== Similar historical events (pre-1972) ===
- The author and historian Zachary Karabell compared US President Chester Arthur reforming the civil service system in the early 1880s to Nixon going to China since Arthur himself had been a product of the spoils system and helped get rid of it by the Pendleton Act.
- The decision of US President Dwight Eisenhower, a former World War II general, to confront the military-industrial complex.
- French President Charles de Gaulle's decision to end the Algerian War, withdraw from Algeria, and give Algeria its independence in 1962 has sometimes been described as a Nixon-to-China moment since de Gaulle's reputation and prestige as a French war hero in World War II helped win support for Algerian independence from most of the French public.
- US President Lyndon Johnson (a southerner from Texas) pushing the Civil Rights Act of 1964 through the US Congress. That is generally considered to be an act of political courage, as Johnson expected correctly that pushing it and other civil rights legislation would damage him and his Democratic Party with white southern voters.

=== Similar political events (post-1972) ===
- In Canada, a notable aspect of the 1985 decision of the Ontario government to extend full funding to Catholic schools was that the ruling Progressive Conservatives had been regarded as articulating the viewpoint of rural Protestants, who were often hostile to Roman Catholicism, especially on issues related to education. In contrast to Nixon's China policy, however, the decision led to political damage for the Progressive Conservatives, who were reduced to a minority government in the subsequent election, partly as a result of having alienated their Protestant base, despite the other political parties also backing the move.
- The actions of Israeli Likud Prime Ministers Menachem Begin (in giving up the Sinai Peninsula in exchange for peace with Egypt in 1979) and Ariel Sharon (in withdrawing from the Gaza Strip in 2005) are sometimes considered Nixon-to-China moments.
- US President Bill Clinton, a member of the traditionally pro-welfare Democratic Party, in 1996 signed legislation reforming the welfare system.
- Conservative Australian Prime Minister John Howard's implementation of strict gun control measures in the aftermath of the Port Arthur massacre. Howard had to overcome "vociferous opposition from many in his own party and almost all members of his Coalition partner" to do so, with Labor Prime Minister Julia Gillard later stating that there was no one who could have done it better.
- Jim Hoagland for the Eugene Register-Guard compared US President George W. Bush's embrace of multilateralism on Iraq in late 2002 as a Nixon-to-China moment. Some people likewise considered Bush's nuclear deals with North Korea, which he declared to be part of the axis of evil in 2002, in 2007 and with India in 2008 to be Nixon-to-China moments.
- U.S. President Barack Obama embracing Social Security reform in 2011.
- The decision of US Chief Justice John Roberts to agree with the liberal wing of the Supreme Court of the United States to uphold the constitutionality of the Patient Protection and Affordable Care Act in National Federation of Independent Business v. Sebelius (2012). Washington Post columnist Charles Krauthammer called Roberts's decision a "Nixon-to-China" moment.
- U.S. President Donald Trump meets with North Korean leader Kim Jong-un, becoming the first U.S. president to meet with any North Korean head of state while in office since the end of the Korean War in 1953.

== In popular culture ==
The expression was used in the 1991 film Star Trek VI: The Undiscovered Country in which "only Nixon could go to China" is quoted by Spock as "an old Vulcan proverb". In the context of the film, itself an allegory of thawing relations between the US and the former Soviet Union, it is given as a reason why James T. Kirk, a character with a history of armed conflict with the Klingons and a personal enmity for them after his son's death, should escort their chancellor to Earth for peace negotiations with the Federation.

== See also ==
- Idiosyncrasy credit
- Triangulation (politics)
- Sister Souljah moment
