= Denny Martin Flinn =

American novelist

- Born: December 21, 1947
- Died: August 24, 2007 (aged 59); Woodland Hills, Los Angeles, California, U.S.
- Education: San Francisco State University
- Occupations: Writer; choreographer; stage director; actor
- Children: 2

Denny Martin Flinn (December 21, 1947 – August 24, 2007) was an American writer, choreographer, stage director and actor with numerous Broadway credits. He co-wrote the screenplay for Star Trek VI: The Undiscovered Country (1991).

== Biography ==
Flinn grew up in California, spending his early life in the cities of Los Angeles and San Francisco. He attended San Francisco State University, his academic major being theatre. While still in college, Flinn performed as a dancer in North Beach, San Francisco. He later moved to New York City, where he found employment as an actor, dancer, and choreographer. His Broadway theatre credits include the original musical Sugar (1972), and revivals of Hello, Dolly! (1975) and Pal Joey (1976). His Off-Broadway credits include the choreography of Six (1971) by Charles Strouse. He also performed in the national tour of Fiddler on the Roof. He also was in the short lived 1978 musical Barbary Coast. In the 80s Flinn toured with the national company of A Chorus Line in the roles of both Zack and Greg.

Flinn later wrote and directed his own Off-Broadway musical: Groucho (1979), starring Lewis J. Stadlen. He choreographed musical sequences for the films The Deceivers (1988) and Ghost (1990), and the television series Another World and Search for Tomorrow.

Flinn wrote the 1989 book What They Did for Love: The Untold Story Behind the Making of A Chorus Line, covering the story behind the production of the 1970s musical A Chorus Line. He next turned to mystery fiction, writing the novels San Francisco Kills (1990) and Killer Finish (1991). He and Nicholas Meyer co-wrote the script of Star Trek VI: The Undiscovered Country (1991). Flinn also wrote The Fearful Summons (1995), a Star Trek novel. His research work Musical! A Grand Tour – the Rise, Glory and Fall of an American Institution (1997) won an ASCAP Deems Taylor Award. His later output consisted of non-fiction books such as How Not To Write a Screenplay: 101 Common Mistakes Most Screenwriters Make (1999) and How Not To Audition: Avoiding the Common Mistakes Most Actors Make (2003).

=== Death ===
Flinn died in Woodland Hills, Los Angeles due to "complications from cancer". He was survived by a wife and two children.

== Filmography ==
- Star Trek VI: The Undiscovered Country (1991) (co-writer)
- The Deceivers (1988) (choreographer)

== Bibliography ==
=== Non-fiction ===
- The Great American Book Musical: A Manifesto, Monograph, and Manual (Limelight Editions 2008) ISBN 978-0879103620
- Ready for My Close-up!: Great Movie Monologues (Limelight Editions 2007) ISBN 978-0879103507
- Little Musicals for Little Theaters (Limelight Editions 2006) ISBN 978-0879103217
- How Not to Write a Screenplay: 101 Common Mistakes Most Screenwriters Make (Lone Eagle Publishing 1999) ISBN 978-1580650151
- Musical!: A Grand Tour (Wadsworth Publishing 1997) ISBN 978-0028646107
- What They Did for Love: The Untold Story Behind the Making of a Chorus Line (Bantam Dell Pub Group 1989) ISBN 978-0553345933

Co-authored:

- How Not to Audition: Avoiding the Common Mistakes Most Actors Make (with Ellie Kanner) (Lone Eagle Publishing 2003) ISBN 978-1580650496

=== Fiction ===
- The Fearful Summons (Star Trek) (Pocket Books 1995) ISBN 978-0671890070
- Killer Finish (Bantam Books 1991) ISBN 978-0553291575
- San Francisco Kills (Bantam Books 1991) ISBN 978-0553280449
