= Evening in Byzantium =

- Genre: Drama
- Based on: Evening in Byzantium by Irwin Shaw
- Written by: Glen A. Larson; Michael Sloan
- Directed by: Jerry London
- Starring: Glenn Ford; Eddie Albert; Vince Edwards; Shirley Jones; Erin Gray; Gregory Sierra; Harry Guardino; Patrick Macnee
- Theme music composer: Stu Phillips
- Country of origin: United States
- Original language: English

Production
- Executive producer: Glen A. Larson
- Producer: Robert F. O'Neill
- Cinematography: Michael D. Margulies
- Editor: Buford F. Hayes
- Running time: 240 minutes
- Production companies: Glen A. Larson Productions; Universal Television
- Budget: $4 million

Original release
- Network: Operation Prime Time
- Release: August 14 – August 15, 1978

Evening in Byzantium is a 1978 American two-part, four-hour made-for-television drama film produced by Glen A. Larson Productions and Universal Television, and directed by Jerry London, about the Cannes Film Festival being overtaken by terrorists. It stars Glenn Ford, Vince Edwards, Shirley Jones, Eddie Albert, and Erin Gray, with Edward James Olmos in a small role. The film is loosely based on the novel of the same name by Irwin Shaw.

== Plot ==
Famous motion picture producer and writer Jesse Craig (Glenn Ford) attends a film festival on the French Riviera. He has not been making films for a few years and some in the film industry think he has retired, but he comes to the Riviera with a new screenplay to show it to his friend and film/literary agent Brian Murphy (Eddie Albert) who is attending the festival. The screenplay is a cautionary tale about terrorists attacking major cities in the United States using hijacked commercial airliners containing nuclear bombs as the attack vehicles. No one knows the content of the script or its author who Craig claims is a new writer by the name of Malcolm Hart.

Bret Easton (Vince Edwards) is a popular American film actor, director and producer who lives and makes films in Europe. His most recent film is about a revolution and uprising in a third world country in which he portrays the leader of the revolutionaries in the film. He secretly arranges to get a copy of Craig's script by sending several women to Murphy's hotel suite. While Murphy is otherwise occupied one of the women takes the script downstairs to the copier machine in the hotel offices.

Craig meets a former love, Constance Dobson (Shirley Jones) and they decide to travel into the countryside together to a small inn. Meanwhile, Easton has read Craig's script at his Riviera mansion and is deeply troubled. His underling, Fabricio (Gregory Sierra) asks him what he wishes to be done. Easton replies, "We'll have to kill Mr. Craig." Later that evening, Fabricio secretly enters Craig's room at the inn where Craig and Constance are staying and plants a bomb among Craig's clothing. The bomb is a string of plastic explosives concealed within the belt of Craig's bathrobe. When the ends of the belt are drawn together it closes the circuit setting off the electrical detonator of the bomb. After Craig enters the room he goes to the bathroom to shower. Constance undresses to surprise Craig when he emerges from the bathroom. She puts on Craig's robe and unknowingly detonates the bomb when she ties the belt. The bomb blast kills Constance and injures Craig who is taken to a local hospital.

The police inform Craig that he was the intended target of the bomb and the type of bomb that was used is the trademark of an assassin who works for a terrorist group that has been staging attacks across Europe. Craig starts his own investigation in an attempt to avenge Constance's murder. He meets a reporter, Gail McKinnon (Erin Gray) who wants to interview him. She ends up assisting him with his inquiries. Craig also contacts an old friend who he had served with in the war, U.S. Air Force Major General Jerry Olson (Harry Guardino), who commands the nearby NATO Air Force Base, for help in gathering intelligence about this terrorist group.

After many plot twists and harrowing experiences Jesse and Gail uncover the fact that Bret Easton is one of the leaders of the terrorist group and the reason he tried to murder Jesse was that Jesse's screenplay, of which Jesse is the real author, comes very close to describing the terrorists' latest attack plan. Meanwhile, the terrorists have secretly taken control of three airliners and have landed them on remote and desolate airfields that have been prepared in advance to off load and imprison the airliners' passengers and then quickly retrofit the planes to each transport and drop a nuclear bomb on three cities in the United States. These cities are Washington, D.C., New York City, and Miami, Florida.

Bombs have been planted on three flying commercial airliners and set to detonate in flight so the terrorist-controlled jets can impersonate the legitimate commercial flights. Jesse Craig and Gail confront Easton on Easton's yacht which is at sea several miles off the coast. Easton confirms Craig's suspicions while boasting about his grand plans and then tries to murder him. A violent brawl ensues and Easton tries to stab Craig with a small sharpened boat anchor. Craig gets a hold of a revolver that he had taken off a dead terrorist before he boarded the yacht and shoots Easton dead.

Jesse and Gail use the radio-telephone on the yacht to contact General Olson. It turns out that General Olsen is flying on one of the targeted jetliners and he is onboard speaking with Jesse via cockpit radio when the bomb onboard explodes. Realizing that General Olson is dead, Jesse contacts General Olson's executive officer at the NATO base and informs him of events. The Air Force is able to identify and shoot down the three terrorist controlled airliners just minutes before their attack runs on the cities take place.

== Cast ==
- Glenn Ford as Jesse Craig
- Vince Edwards as Bret Easton
- Eddie Albert as Brian Murphy
- Patrick Macnee as Ian Wadleigh
- Shirley Jones as Constance Dobson
- Gregory Sierra as Fabricio
- Harry Guardino as Jerry Olson
- Simon Oakland as Walter Klein
- Gloria DeHaven as Sonia Murphy
- Christian Marquand as Insp. DuBois
- Michael Cole as Danny
- Erin Gray as Gail McKinnon
- George Lazenby as Roger Tory
- James Booth as Jack Conrad
- Marcel Hillaire as Inspector LeDioux
- Lee Bergere as M. Carroll
- Len Birman as Leonardo
- Sid Haig as Asted
- Edward James Olmos as Angelo
- George Skaff as Moustapha Kamel
- Chris Winfield s Michael Ruddy
- Carol Baxter as Sybil
- Byron Morrow as Judge
- Ben Frommer as Sine
- William Dozier as William Bast
- Nick Dyrenforth as Senator Kennedy
- Cynthia Ford as Penny Craig
- Anthony Costello as John Macklin

== Production ==
Evening in Byzantium was one of the many TV movies, miniseries and other shows syndicated to local independent television stations in the US in the late 1970s as part of a project known as Operation Prime Time, in an effort to compete with the three major broadcast networks.

== Reception ==
Evening in Byzantium, received the typical reviews for a made-for-television program, with reviewers noting: "It's all very silly, though played very sincerely by most of the cast, and none of the plot described is less plausible than the notion that Glenn Ford and Erin Gray could ignore the 36-year difference in their ages." Today, the film takes on a more significant meaning. "A piece of made-for-television hack work that suddenly became sort of topical 23 years later, with the attacks on the New York World Trade Center and the Pentagon on September 11, 2001".
