= Vince Edwards =

American actor (1928–1996)

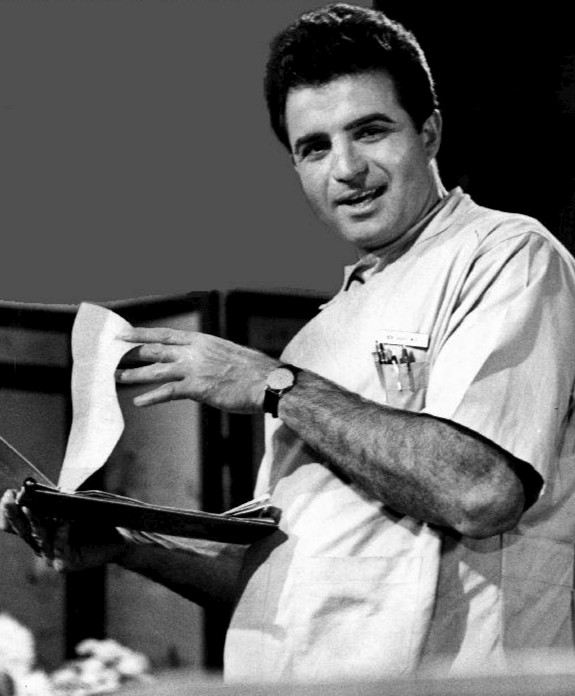
- As Ben Casey, 1963
- Born: Vincent Edward Zoine (Note: Sources differ on the spelling of Edwards's birth surname and his exact birth date. His New York Times obituary gives "Zoine" and July 9, 1928. His UPI obituary and a 1962 syndicated newspaper column written by Edwards himself instead give "Zoino" and the same birth date. An obituary index compiled by Newcastle University's School of Computing Science instead gives "Vincente Eduardo Zoino" and July 7, 1928.); July 9, 1928; New York City, New York, U.S.
- Died: March 11, 1996 (aged 67); Los Angeles, California, U.S.
- Other name: Vincent Edwards
- Education: Ohio State University; University of Hawaii; American Academy of Dramatic Arts
- Occupations: Actor, director
- Years active: 1947–1995
- Spouses: Kathy Kersh (m. 1965; div. 1965) Linda Foster (m. 1967; div. 1972) Cassandra Edwards (m. 1980, divorced) Janet Friedman (m. 1994)
- Children: 3

Vince Edwards (born Vincent Edward Zoine; July 9, 1928 – March 11, 1996) was an American actor, director, and singer. He was best known for his TV role as Dr. Ben Casey and as Major Cliff Bricker in the 1968 war film The Devil's Brigade.

== Early life ==
Edwards was born in the Brownsville section of Brooklyn, New York City, New York, to Julia and Vincento Zoine, an Italian-American bricklayer. He and his twin brother, Anthony, were the youngest of seven children.

He studied aviation mechanics at East New York Vocational High School, graduating in June 1945.

An excellent swimmer, he worked as a lifeguard at Coney Island and swam for the Flatbush Boys Club. He was a standout on his high school swim team, also playing on the school's baseball and track teams. He studied at Ohio State University on an athletic scholarship, where he was part of the university's team that won the United States Swimming National Championships. After two years at Ohio State, he transferred to the University of Hawaii, where he spent much time training as a swimmer for the Olympics; an appendectomy cut short his swimming career before he was able to compete.

While in college he was involved in theater productions.

== Career ==
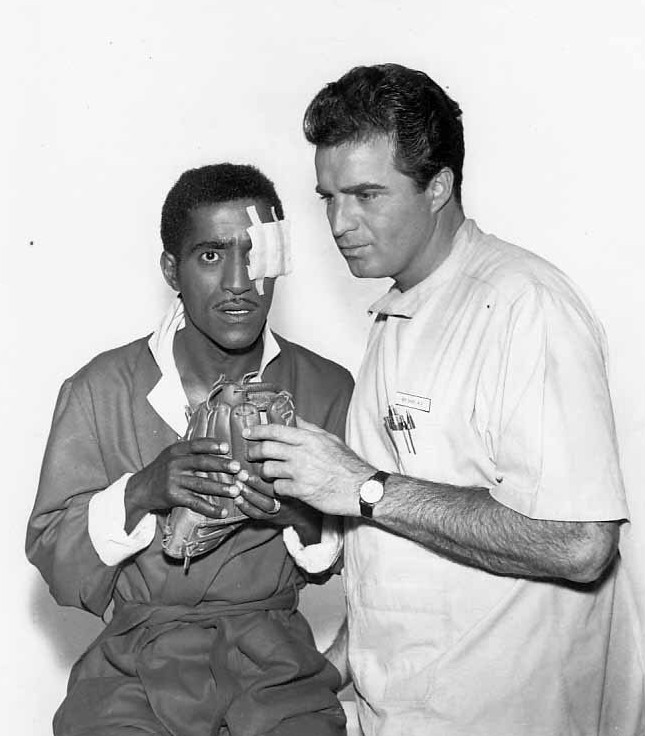
Edwards as Ben Casey, with guest star Sammy Davis Jr. (1963)

=== Early roles and Ben Casey ===
Edwards studied acting at the American Academy of Dramatic Arts; his classmates included Anne Bancroft, John Cassavetes, and Grace Kelly. Around this time he became friends with character actor Nick Dennis, who introduced him to Marlon Brando; Dennis was then appearing alongside Brando in the original Broadway production of A Streetcar Named Desire. In 1951, he signed a contract with Paramount Pictures, making his film debut as Vincent Edwards that year in Mister Universe. The following year he played the lead role in Hiawatha. Although he had major roles in several films, including the film noirs The Killing (1956) and Murder by Contract (1958), it was not until he was cast as the title character of the medical drama Ben Casey that he achieved stardom.

Edwards was discovered for the role by entertainer Bing Crosby, whose production company made the series. Ben Casey ran on ABC from 1961 to 1966 and made Edwards a television star. Sources disagree on how many episodes of the series he directed himself: figures range from seven to a dozen to about 20 of the show's 154 episodes, said to have been his first regular directing work. He used the show's popularity to launch a recording career, releasing six albums. For much of this period he was represented by Hollywood agent Abner "Abby" Greshler of Diamond Artists, described in trade obituaries as one of the industry's first "super agents" for pioneering the package deals that combined stars, directors, and writers on a single project. In a 1988 Associated Press interview, Edwards recalled the suddenness of his rise to fame: "I went from obscurity to fame." As a result of the show's success and his own popularity, Edwards also appeared in the all-star war film The Victors in 1963.

Even while Ben Casey was still airing, Edwards worked to build a parallel film career as insurance against the series ending. In a November 1963 interview, he outlined a plan to make one major theatrical feature a year for the next five years, contrasted his brooding on-screen image with his actual temperament, and pointed to Jim Garner and Steve McQueen as television leads who had successfully shed the typecasting of Maverick and Wanted: Dead or Alive. "If I'm a good enough actor," he said, "people will eventually forget that I played Ben Casey."

Writing in his own newspaper column in 1962, Edwards described the years before his Ben Casey breakthrough as "pounding away at the Door of Opportunity for some 12 years" before it finally opened, and noted that columnists had already begun describing his interpretation of the character as surly, moody, sullen, irascible, explosive, and testy.

=== Post-Ben Casey film and television work ===
When the Ben Casey television series ended, Edwards returned to acting in motion pictures with a major role in the 1968 war drama The Devil's Brigade, together with films such as Hammerhead (1968), The Desperados (1969), and The Mad Bomber (1973). He spent fourteen weeks on location in Utah filming The Devil's Brigade, and while filming Hammerhead on location in Lisbon, Portugal, he was hospitalized for several days in October 1967 after slipping and breaking a bone in his heel.

In 1970, Edwards starred in another TV series, the short-lived Matt Lincoln, in which he played a psychiatrist running an inner-city telephone counseling hotline for troubled teenagers. In 1983, he played the main protagonist, Hawk, in the science-fiction film Space Raiders. He continued to act in film as well as in guest spots on television, including roles in The Rhinemann Exchange (1977) and Evening in Byzantium (1978), and the pilot episode of Knight Rider, "Knight of the Phoenix," in 1982.

=== Directing career ===
Edwards directed numerous episodes of Ben Casey itself (see above) and continued to direct television from the 1970s into the early 1990s. He directed single episodes of Police Story (1976), The Hardy Boys/Nancy Drew Mysteries and David Cassidy: Man Undercover (both 1978), B. J. and the Bear (the December 1979 episode "Silent Night, Unholy Night"), Fantasy Island, The Fall Guy (1982), and In the Heat of the Night (the 1990 episode "Indiscretions"), in addition to his work on Battlestar Galactica and Galactica 1980, detailed below.

He wrote and directed the 1973 television film Maneater, co-writing the script with Marcus Demian and Jimmy Sangster; it premiered on ABC's Movie of the Week anthology on December 8, 1973, and was Edwards's first directing assignment on a television film, following his episodic Ben Casey work in the mid-1960s.

He directed a number of episodes in a variety of television series including the original Battlestar Galactica, namely the two-part episode "The Living Legend" on the original series and the two-part "The Super Scouts" on its 1980 sequel series, Galactica 1980. He also directed, and with Christian I. Nyby II co-wrote, Mission Galactica: The Cylon Attack (1979), a theatrical feature assembled largely from "The Living Legend" for release outside the United States.

=== Voice work and later roles ===
He was also the voice of Jake Rockwell in the 1986 animated series Centurions, appearing in all 65 episodes, and provided additional voices for 13 episodes of the animated It's Punky Brewster (1985). In 1986 he co-starred as FBI Agent Frank Walker in the television film The Return of Mickey Spillane's Mike Hammer. Twenty-two years after the series ended, Edwards returned to television as Dr. Ben Casey in a 1988 syndicated TV movie, The Return of Ben Casey, in which the character was depicted as having served as a surgeon in Vietnam and having since married and divorced. He made his last film, The Fear, in 1995. (Note: Several tertiary sources state that Edwards was diagnosed with pancreatic cancer shortly after completing The Fear. No contemporaneous news source for this specific claim has been located in the course of preparing this revision; if a citation cannot be found, editors may wish to remove or soften it. Separately, an IMDb trivia entry describes only "a month-long struggle" with the disease before his March 1996 death, which would place a diagnosis closer to February 1996—more than a year after The Fear wrapped production in 1994.)

During his acting career, Edwards ventured occasionally into the recording studio, and a number of singles were released in his name. The most historically notable was never issued: Edwards is reported to have recorded "The Wonder of You" in 1958, before Ray Peterson's better-known 1959 version, which became an international hit and was later popularized by Elvis Presley; Edwards's recording has never surfaced.

== Personal life ==
=== Marriages and family ===
Edwards married four times. His first marriage, to actress Kathy Kersh, lasted from 1965 to October 1965 and produced one daughter. In March 1967, Edwards sought to have Kersh held in contempt of court, alleging in a filing that she had made it inconvenient for him to exercise his court-ordered visitation rights; he was awarded the right to see their daughter twice weekly following a hearing. Edwards's filing quoted Kersh's response to a visitation request as, "I have made other plans. The world does not revolve around you." Kersh later married actor Burt Ward.

He next married Linda Foster, a British-born actress who had emigrated to the United States from Lancaster, England, in 1960. They wed on August 6, 1967, at the Beverly Hills home of singer Dean Martin, where the couple had met. The marriage produced two daughters, Angela and Nicole; Foster filed for divorce in August 1972. Edwards married Cassandra Edwards in 1980, and they later divorced. His fourth and final marriage, to Janet Friedman, took place in 1994 and lasted until his death.

Edwards was survived by his widow, his brother, and three daughters from his earlier marriages.

=== Gambling ===
Edwards was a compulsive gambler for many years, acknowledging the fact to a longtime friend, director William Friedkin, who said that he had "sacrificed a good portion of his career to an addiction."

In his last years, Edwards and his wife Janet attempted to educate others about the dangers of gambling. After his death, his wife said that one of the messages Vince wanted to share was that "gambling is NOT glamorous, despite today's suave-sounding euphemisms, such as gaming."

== Death ==
Edwards died of pancreatic cancer in Los Angeles, California, on March 11, 1996. According to his manager, T. J. Castromovo, he had been hospitalized for about ten days before his death. He was buried at the Holy Cross Cemetery in Culver City, California.

== Selected filmography ==
- 1951 Mister Universe as Tommy Tomkins (as Vincent Edwards)
- 1952 Sailor Beware as Blayden (as Vincent Edwards)
- 1952 Hiawatha as Hiawatha (as Vincent Edwards)
- 1954 Rogue Cop as Joey Langley
- 1955 Cell 2455, Death Row as Hamilton
- 1955 The Night Holds Terror as Victor Gosset
- 1956 Private's Progress as German Officer (uncredited)
- 1956 Serenade as Marco Roselli
- 1956 The Killing as Val Cannon
- 1957 Alfred Hitchcock Presents (Season 3 Episode 9: "The Young One") as Tex
- 1957 Hit and Run as Frank
- 1957 The Three Faces of Eve as Army Sergeant (uncredited)
- 1957 The Hired Gun as Kell Beldon
- 1957 Ride Out for Revenge as Chief Little Wolf
- 1958 Island Women as Mike
- 1958 Murder by Contract as Claude
- 1959 City of Fear as Vince Ryker
- 1959 The Scavengers as Stuart Allison
- 1961 Too Late Blues as Tommy Sheehan (as Vincent Edwards)
- 1961 The Outsider as George
- 1963 The Victors as Private George Baker (as Vincent Edwards)
- 1968 Hammerhead as Charles Hood
- 1968 The Devil's Brigade as Major Cliff Bricker
- 1969 The Desperados as David Galt
- 1970 Sole Survivor as Major Michael Devlin
- 1971 Do Not Fold, Spindle or Mutilate as Computer catfisher
- 1973 The Mad Bomber as Lieutenant Geronimo Minneli
- 1977 The Rhinemann Exchange (TV Movie) as General Swanson
- 1978 Evening in Byzantium (TV Movie) as Bret Easton
- 1982 The Seduction as Maxwell
- 1983 Space Raiders as "Hawk"
- 1983 Deal of the Century as Frank Stryker
- 1985 The Fix as Frank Lane
- 1985 Tales from the Darkside as Henry Gropper - "It All Comes Out in the Wash" episode
- 1986 Sno-Line as Steve King
- 1987 Return to Horror High as Richard Birnbaum
- 1987 The Dirty Dozen: The Deadly Mission (TV Movie) as Sergeant Holt
- 1988 Cellar Dweller as Norman Meshelski
- 1991 Son of Darkness: To Die for II as Police Honcho
- 1991 Motorama as Doctor
- 1993 King B: A Life in the Movies as Himself
- 1995 The Fear as Uncle Pete (final film role)
