= Gregory Sierra =

American actor (1937–2021)

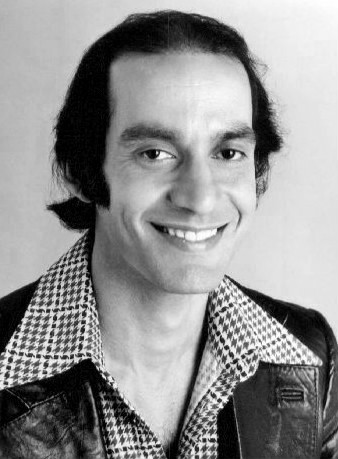
- Sierra in 1975
- Born: January 25, 1937; New York City, U.S.
- Died: January 4, 2021 (aged 83); Laguna Woods, California, U.S.
- Occupation: Actor
- Years active: 1967–2018
- Spouses: Eileen Defelitta (m. 1969; div. 1972) Susan Pollock (m. 1976; died 1978): Helene Tabor 1984

Gregory Joseph Sierra (January 25, 1937 – January 4, 2021) was an American actor known for his roles as Detective Sergeant Chano Amengual on Barney Miller; Julio Fuentes, the Puerto Rican neighbor of Fred G. Sanford on Sanford and Son; Marruja in The Castaway Cowboy (1974); and Lieutenant Lou Rodriguez in the first four episodes of Miami Vice.

== Early life ==
Gregory Joseph Sierra was born on January 25, 1937, in Manhattan. He was raised in Spanish Harlem by an aunt because his parents did not take charge of his care. After serving in the Air Force, Sierra went with a friend to an acting school audition in Manhattan. Sierra was there only to support his friend, but after performing some improvisation, he was admitted instead of his friend.

== Career ==
He began his career on the stage, touring with the National Shakespeare Company, and in 1967, appeared as the Duke of Austria in King John at the New York Shakespeare Festival. He moved to Los Angeles in the late 1960s to work in film and television.

Sierra's film credits include The Flying Nun (1969), Beneath the Planet of the Apes (1970), Papillon (1973), The Towering Inferno (1974), The Prisoner of Zenda (1979) and The Trouble with Spies (1987).

In 1973, Sierra guest-starred in an unusually dramatic episode of All in the Family in the role of Paul Benjamin, a Jewish activist with the "Hebrew Defense Association" (based on the Jewish Defense League) fighting antisemitism in the neighborhood. In the plot, he volunteers in helping chase away neo-Nazi thugs who spray-painted a swastika on the Bunkers' front door. He is killed by a car bomb planted by the neo-Nazis.

From 1972 to 1975, he had the recurring role of Julio Fuentes, a Puerto Rican neighbor of the Sanfords, on Sanford and Son. After that, he spent two years as part of the ensemble cast of Barney Miller, as Detective Sergeant Chano Amengual. He starred as Dr. Tony Menzies on the short-lived 1977 sitcom A.E.S. Hudson Street. In 1980 and 1981, for the fourth and unresolved final season of the soap opera parody Soap, he played Latin American revolutionary Carlos "El Puerco" Valdez, Jessica Tate's lover.

In 1984, he was cast in Miami Vice as Lieutenant Lou Rodriguez, but he asked to be written out of the series after four episodes because he did not want to reside in Miami, where the show was being filmed, according to the season 1 DVD commentary. He was replaced by Edward James Olmos as Lieutenant Martin Castillo. He had regular roles on the TV shows Zorro and Son (1983) and Something Is Out There (1988–1989).

In 1992, Sierra played drug dealer Felix Barbossa in the film Deep Cover, directed by Bill Duke and starring Laurence Fishburne and Jeff Goldblum. He appeared in the comedy sequel Honey, I Blew Up the Kid. The following year, he played an Iraqi patrol boat captain in the comedy Hot Shots! Part Deux. He played a man named Villanazul in the low-budget 1998 movie The Wonderful Ice Cream Suit. He appeared as Corbin Entek in the Star Trek: Deep Space Nine episode "Second Skin".

His plethora of television credits also include The Waltons; Mod Squad; Kung Fu; Alias Smith and Jones; Mission: Impossible (3 episodes); Hawaii Five-O; Gunsmoke; The Greatest American Hero; Midnight Caller; The Fresh Prince of Bel-Air; The X-Files; Murder, She Wrote; Hart to Hart and Hill Street Blues. A hard-working, journeyman actor, he was so frequently credited "And Gregory Sierra" that he is known by trivia fans as "And Gregory Sierra".

== Personal life and death ==
Sierra was of Puerto Rican descent. He married Eileen Defelitta in 1969, and they were divorced in 1972. In 1976, he married Susan Pollock, and they remained wed until her suicide in 1978. According to his wife, Helene Tabor, he died at age 83 in Laguna Woods, California, on January 4, 2021, after a long battle with stomach and liver cancer.

== Filmography ==
=== Film ===
- Beneath the Planet of the Apes (1970) — Verger
- Getting Straight (1970) — Garcia
- Weekend of Terror (1970) — Police Sergeant
- Red Sky at Morning (1971) — Chamaco
- Machismo: 40 Graves for 40 Guns (1971) — Lopez
- Pocket Money (1972) — Chavarin
- The Poseidon Adventure (1972) — Uncredited
- The Culpepper Cattle Co. (1972) — One-Eyed Horsethief
- The Wrath of God (1972) — Jurado
- The Thief Who Came to Dinner (1973) — Dynamite
- The Clones (1973) — Nemo
- Papillon (1973) — Antonio
- The Laughing Policeman (1973) — Vickery
- Goodnight Jackie (1974) — Paul
- The Castaway Cowboy (1974) — Marruja (Bryson's henchman)
- The Towering Inferno (1974) — Carlos
- The Night They Took Miss Beautiful (1977) — Omar Welk
- Mean Dog Blues (1978) — Jesus Gonzales
- Evening in Byzantium (1978) — Fabricio
- The Prisoner of Zenda (1979) — The Count
- The Night the Bridge Fell Down (1983) — Diego Ramirez
- Let's Get Harry (1986) — Alphonso
- The Trouble with Spies (1987) — Capt. Sanchez
- Deep Cover (1992) — Barbosa
- Honey, I Blew Up the Kid (1992) — Terence Wheeler
- Hot Shots! Part Deux (1993) — Iraqi Patrol Boat Captain (uncredited)
- A Low Down Dirty Shame (1994) — Captain Nunez
- The Wonderful Ice Cream Suit (1998) — Villanazul
- Vampires (1998) — Father Giovanni
- Jane Austen's Mafia! (1998) — Bonifacio
- The Other Side of the Wind (2018) — Jack Simon (final film role)

=== Television ===
- It Takes a Thief — episode "Rock-Bye, Bye, Baby" — Fletcher (1969)
- The Flying Nun — episode "A Ticket for Bertrille" — Officer Juarez (1969)
- Mission: Impossible — episode "Phantoms" — Gomal (1970)
- McCloud — episode "Portrait of a Dead Girl" — 1st Deputy (1970)
- Mission: Impossible — episode "Chico" — Prado's butler (1970)
- Mod Squad — episode "A Town Called Sincere" — Zamaron (1970)
- Alias Smith and Jones — episode "Journey from San Juan" — Juan (1971)
- Mission: Impossible — episode "Cocaine" — Fernando Laroca (1972)
- Sanford and Son — 12 episodes — Julio Fuentes (1972-1975)
- Insight — episodes — "Hey, Janitor", "The Eye of the Camel", "Loser Take All", "Plus Time Served", & "A Decision to Love" (1973 — 1981)
- Kung Fu — episode "The Stone" — Solly (1973)
- All in the Family — episode "Archie is Branded" — Paul Benjamin (1973)
- The Waltons — episode "The Gypsies" — Volta (1973)
- Hawaii Five-O — episode "Tricks Are Not Treats" — Lolo (1973)
- Banacek — episode "The Two Million Clams of Cap'n Jack" — Norman Esposito (1973)
- Gunsmoke — 3 episodes — Blue Jacket / Osuna (1973-1975)
- McCloud — episode "This Must Be the Alamo" — Patrolman Rico Cross (1974)
- Columbo — episode "Publish or Perish" — Lou D'Allessandro (1974)
- Barney Miller — 35 episodes — Det. Sgt. Chano Amengual (1975-1976)
- Hunter — episode "The K Group: Parts 1 & 2" (1977)
- A.E.S. Hudson Street — 5 episodes — Dr. Tony Menzies (1978)
- Soap — 12 episodes — Carlos 'El Puerco' Valdez (1980–81)
- The Greatest American Hero — episode "Hog Wild" — Sheriff Mark Vargas (1981)
- Hart to Hart — episode "A Couple of Harts" — Eduardo (1981)
- Quincy M.E. — episode "Baby Rattlesnakes" — Rick Durado (1982)
- Hill Street Blues — ADA Alvarez — four episodes (1982)
- Zorro and Son — Commandante Paco Pico (1983)
- Kenny Rogers as The Gambler: The Adventure Continues — TV movie — Silvera (1983)
- Simon & Simon — episode "The Club Murder Vacation" — Gregory Cable (1983)
- Miami Vice — 4 episodes — Lt. Lou Rodriguez (1984)
- The Paper Chase — episode "Burden of Proof" — Public Defender (1984)
- Blue Thunder — episode "The Long Flight" — Luis Creighton Acuna (1984)
- Hart to Hart — episode "Max's Waltz" — Howard Castle (1984)
- Cagney & Lacey — episode "Violation" — Eddie 'Cleanhead' Stutz (1985)
- Simon & Simon — episode "The Enchilada Express" — Raul Gutierrez (1985)
- Airwolf — episode "Wildfire" — Frank Ochoa (1986)
- MacGyver — episode "The Gauntlet" — General Antonio Vasquez (1985)
- Murder, She Wrote — episode "Broadway Malady" — NYPD Det. Sgt. Moreno (1985)
- MacGyver — episode "Jack of Lies" — Colonel Antunnez (1986)
- Hunter — episode "Flashpoint" — Councilman Elandro (1987)
- Magnum, P.I. — episode "Pleasure Principle" — Miguel Torres (1987)
- Cagney & Lacey — episode "Ahead of the Game" — Coach Kellino (1987)
- The Munsters Today — episode "Farewell Grandpa" — Don Steinburg (1988)
- Super Password — Himself (Celebrity Contestant) (1988)
- Murder, She Wrote — episode "Murder Through the Looking Glass" — Sanchez (1988)
- Growing Pains — episodes "The New Deal": Parts 1 & 2 — Dr. Paul Ramirez (1989)
- MacGyver — episode "The Treasure of Manco" — Captain Diaz (1990)
- Unspeakable Acts — TV movie — Frank Fuster (1990)
- The Golden Palace — episode "Ebbtide for the Defense" — Rubin (1992)
- Murder, She Wrote — episode "Day of the Dead" — Ramon (1992)
- The Fresh Prince of Bel-Air — episode "Will Gets Committed" — Hector Alvarez (1992)
- The X-Files — episode "The Jersey Devil" — Dr. Diamond (1993)
- Murder, She Wrote — episodes "The Petrified Florist", "A Nest of Vipers", & "Film Flam" — Lieutenant Gabriel Caceras (1993-1995)
- Thea — episode "How I Got Over" — Mr.Gutierrez (1993)
- Star Trek: Deep Space Nine — episode "Second Skin" — Entek (1994)
- Dr. Quinn, Medicine Woman — episodes — "The Washington Affair: Parts 1 & 2" — General Ely Samuel Parker (1994)
- Walker, Texas Ranger — episode "Standoff" — Col. Rafael Mendoza (1995)
- Ellen — episode "When the Vow Breaks" — General Colon (1996)
