= Idiosyncrasy credit =

Concept in social psychology

Idiosyncrasy credit is a concept in social psychology that describes an individual's capacity to acceptably deviate from group expectations. Idiosyncrasy credits are increased (earned) each time an individual conforms to a group's expectations, and decreased (spent) each time an individual deviates from a group's expectations. Edwin Hollander originally defined idiosyncrasy credit as "an accumulation of positively disposed impressions residing in the perceptions of relevant others; it is… the degree to which an individual may deviate from the common expectancies of the group".

Idiosyncrasy credits are but one of a number of concepts that attempt to explain how some minority views are influential, while others are not (see Minority influence). Idiosyncrasy credits are also relevant to the study of leadership, as leaders with many credits are often afforded a greater ability to try innovative strategies to meet group goals.

== Overview ==
Hollander's (1958) original work on idiosyncrasy credit is premised on the assumption that all individuals sharing a common group membership also share common group-based expectations of each other, and failure to fulfil these expectations will result in expulsion from the group. Individuals who fulfil these expectations will benefit other group members, prompting them to accord the fulfilling individual greater positive status within the group. Hollander posits that one component of this positive status is "idiosyncrasy credit", a functional status buffer that permits the individual to deviate from group expectations. Hollander believed that idiosyncrasy credit is expended by exhibiting deviant or innovative behaviours, influencing others to engage in same such behaviours, or by failing to perform an expected task.

== Leadership ==
Idiosyncrasy credits also play a role in group situations that require leadership. Hollander (1958) argued that leaders who acted in a highly conformist manner also accumulate idiosyncrasy credits over time (and thus, as they climbed the organizational ladder). Thus, when a highly conformist leader arrives at the top of the organizational ladder, he or she is free to 'spend' their accumulated idiosyncrasy credits by behaving in an innovative and creative manner.

=== Transactional leadership model ===
Idiosyncrasy credit is frequently invoked to explain how leaders influence their followers to adopt new and innovative attitudes, behaviours and values. The most commonly employed framework is the transactional leadership (TLM), which explains the relationship between a leader and their followers on an individual–individual basis. According to TLM, followers accord leaders idiosyncrasy credit as a function of how the leader fulfils each follower's personal expectations of a leader, and how the leader's decisions impact the follower as an individual. From a TLM perspective, a leader's idiosyncrasy credit is the sum of the idiosyncrasy credit extended to them by each of their followers.

=== Social identity analysis ===
An alternative framework is social identity approach (SIA) which explains the relationship between group leaders and followers as a function of each follower's psychological belonging to the group. Followers that identify with the group will accord status to their leader as a function of that leader's prototypicality. SIA studies have suggested that, ceteris paribus, the status accorded by high-identifying followers to prototypical leaders contains a component of idiosyncrasy credit. Within the SIA framework, idiosyncrasy credit permits leaders to make counter-normative or innovative decisions. Followers evaluate how new decisions impact upon the leader's and the group's prototypicality and deduct credits accordingly. According to SIA, a leader's idiosyncrasy credit is the sum of the idiosyncrasy credit extended to them by each of their followers. Although this is also the case according to TLM, the theories differ regarding the psychological processes that motivate idiosyncrasy credit.

== Examples ==
Numerous research studies support Hollander's initial claims. For example, a study by Hollander and Julian (1970) found that leaders of groups involved in decision-making tasks who were democratically elected (presumably because they had acted in the most conformist way to the group, and thus had many idiosyncrasy credits) garnered more support from the group, felt more competent, and were more likely to suggest unique and divergent from the other members of the group than those who were not democratically elected. Similar results were obtained in a study by Merei (1949) that examined children's leadership potential. In this study, older children were placed into small groups of younger children in a Hungarian nursery. The children who exhibited the most success were those who initially acted in a conformist manner, and only later introduced minor variations in group practice.

More recent research (e.g., Hogg, 2001; Knippenberg & Hogg, 2003) has explained this phenomenon by stating that group normative behaviour on the part of the leader effectively communicates to the group that the leader is "one of their own" – a central, contributing member who identifies with the group, and acts in the best interest of the group. Thus, leaders with many idiosyncrasy credits are afforded more trust and leeway when suggesting unique or innovative ways of conducting the group's activities, as the group believes that whatever is suggested by the leader is in the best interest of the group.

== Relationship with the double standard ==
Political science research has documented that partisan motivated reasoning can foster a pronounced tendency to apply double standards in both moral and political judgment. In particular, an ingroup leader — especially when perceived as representative of the group and as advancing its interests — may be granted considerable latitude when violating norms that would otherwise be enforced. A recent review of the literature goes so far as to describe this phenomenon in terms of “Teflon leadership”: the capacity of certain leaders to cross moral boundaries without incurring the consequences normally associated with such transgressions.

== In popular culture ==
- In The Simpsons episode "Stark Raving Dad", Homer Simpson unwittingly raises his shortage of idiosyncrasy credits among colleagues by stating "I can't wear a pink shirt to work. Everybody wears white shirts. I'm not popular enough to be different!" (Idiosyncrasy credit is a component of popularity that permits being different).
- The oft rephrased saying "He who is known as an early riser can stay in until noon" is an example of a person spending idiosyncrasy credits.

== Related concepts ==
- Dissent
- Group dynamics
- Social impact theory
- Social norm
