= Rosanna DeSoto =

American actress

- Born: September 2, 1950 (age 75); San Jose, California, U.S.
- Occupation: Actress
- Years active: 1972–present
- Spouse(s): Jonathan Taplin (1974–1978); David S. Ward (1980–present)
- Children: 2

Rosanna DeSoto (born September 2, 1950) is an American actress who has performed in films and television. She is best known for her roles in Stand and Deliver, for which she won an Independent Spirit Award for Best Supporting Female, and in Star Trek VI: The Undiscovered Country as Azetbur, the daughter of Klingon Chancellor Gorkon.

DeSoto's other film roles include La Bamba (1987) as Ritchie Valens' mother Connie Valenzuela; and Family Business (1989) as the wife of Vito McMullen (Dustin Hoffman).

DeSoto's first television role was in the series A.E.S. Hudson Street (1978) as Nurse Rosa Santiago. She starred in the short-lived series The Redd Foxx Show (1986). She has made guest appearances on many television series, including Cannon, Kung Fu, Barnaby Jones, Barney Miller, Melrose Place, Murder, She Wrote, The Bold and the Beautiful and Law & Order.

== Early life and education ==
DeSoto was born in San Jose, California on September 2, 1950. Both of her parents were Mexican immigrants from Michoacán. DeSoto had four brothers and four sisters, making her one of nine siblings. She spent her early years handpicking fruit, particularly apples.

DeSoto graduated from San Jose State University, double majoring in Spanish literature and drama. During her tenure at SJSU, DeSoto rehearsed and performed with the Light Opera Company.

== Career ==
DeSoto made her film debut in 1979 with The In-Laws. She appeared opposite Nick Nolte and Debra Winger in Cannery Row (1982). DeSoto won the Golden Eagle Award for Best Actress for her performance in The Ballad of Gregorio Cortez (1982). In 1986, she appeared opposite Rob Lowe and Demi Moore in About Last Night, playing Mrs. Lyons. That same year, she portrayed waitress Diana Olmos in the short-lived sitcom The Redd Foxx Show.

In 1987, DeSoto appeared in the biographic film La Bamba. In that film, she portrayed Connie Valenzuela, the mother of Ritchie Valens, played by Lou Diamond Phillips. The next year, DeSoto collaborated with Phillips again in the 1988 biopic Stand and Deliver, where she portrayed Fabiola Escalante, the wife of Jaime Escalante (Edward James Olmos). Her performance garnered her an Independent Spirit Award for Best Supporting Female.

In 1989, she played the wife of Dustin Hoffman's character in Family Business. That same year, she landed the principal role in Face of the Enemy. She also played Azetbur in Star Trek VI: The Undiscovered Country (1991). DeSoto portrayed Linda in The 24 Hour Woman (1999). She has also acted in the soap opera, The Bold and the Beautiful.

DeSoto wrote and appeared in “A Woman in Progress/Canto de Oro, Cuento de Mujer” that was produced by the Intar Theater group in New York in 2005.

== Personal life ==
From 1974 to 1978, DeSoto was married to Jonathan Taplin. They have one daughter, Daniela (born June 1976).

DeSoto has been married to David S. Ward since September 20, 1980. They have a daughter, Sylvana Ward Durrett (born 1981).

DeSoto is also the aunt of Ken Ramoz, who appeared in such films as Gettysburg (1993) and Getting Even with Dad (1994).

== Filmography ==
=== Film ===
Year	Title	Role	Notes
1979	The In-Laws	Evita	
1980	Serial	Maria	
1982	The Ballad of Gregorio Cortez	Carlota Muñoz	
1982	Cannery Row	Ellen Sedgewick	
1986	About Last Night...	Mrs. Lyons	
1986	American Justice	Manuela	
1987	La Bamba	Connie Valenzuela	
1988	Stand and Deliver	Fabiola Escalante	
1989	Family Business	Elaine McMullen	
1989	Face of the Enemy	Nelioufar Mobbasser	
1991	San Juan Story	Olga Torres	Short
1991	Star Trek VI: The Undiscovered Country	Azetbur	
1999	The 24 Hour Woman	Linda	
2000	Mambo Café	Carmen	
2001	Wooly Boys	Martinez	
2005	Once Upon a Wedding	Sonia	

=== Television ===
Year	Title	Role	Notes
1972	Cannon	Elena Duran	1 episode
1973	The Mod Squad	Dolores	1 episode
1973	Kung Fu	Kiona ( as Rosana Soto )	1 episode
1975-1979	Barney Miller	Miss del Fuego/Elena Elezando/Teresa Tasco	4 episodes
1975	Harry O	Edwina	1 episode
1975	McMillan & Wife	Katina	1 episode
1976	The Streets of San Francisco	Angie	1 episode
1978	A.E.S. Hudson Street	Nurse Rosa Santiago	Regular; 5 episodes
1978	Rhoda	Receptionist	1 episode
1978	The White Shadow	Spanish Teacher	1 episode
1979	Angie	Nurse Alonzo	1 episode
1979	Lou Grant	Angela Cariaga	1 episode
1979	Paris	Marisa Gomez	1 episode
1981	Three Hundred Miles for Stephanie	Lydia	
1982	American Playhouse	Carlota Muñoz	Episode "The Ballad of Gregorio Cortez"
1983	Condo		1 episode
1983	Women of San Quentin	Adela Reynosa	
1985	Punky Brewster	Rita J. Sanchez	2 episodes
1985-1987	Miami Vice	Erendira/Maria Lupe Cruz	Episodes "Bushido"/ "God's work"
1986	The Redd Foxx Show	Diana Olmos	Regular; 7 episodes
1986	Joe Bash	Maria	1 episode
1988-1996	Murder She Wrote	Consuela Schaeffer/Maria Galvan/Iza Decalde	3 episodes
1992	Melrose Place	Delia Saldana	2 episodes
1992	Child of Rage	Doris	
1992	Law & Order	Mrs. Ortega	1 episode
1993	Quantum Leap	Fiddler	1 episode
1995	Picture Windows	Layla	Episode "Soir Blue"
1995	Kissing Miranda	Carmen Ortega	1 episode
1996	Walker, Texas Ranger	Cora Reynolds	Episode "A Silent Cry"
1997	Invasion	Nancy Ochoa	
1998	Thicker Than Blood	Señora	
2000	Chicago Hope	Lulu	Episode "Devoted Attachment"
2001	Strong Medicine	Dr. Elena Gomez	Episode "History"
2001	The Bold and the Beautiful	Liliana Dominguez	6 episodes
