= Maureen Duvalier =

Bahamian blues/calypso artist

Maureen Duvalier MBE
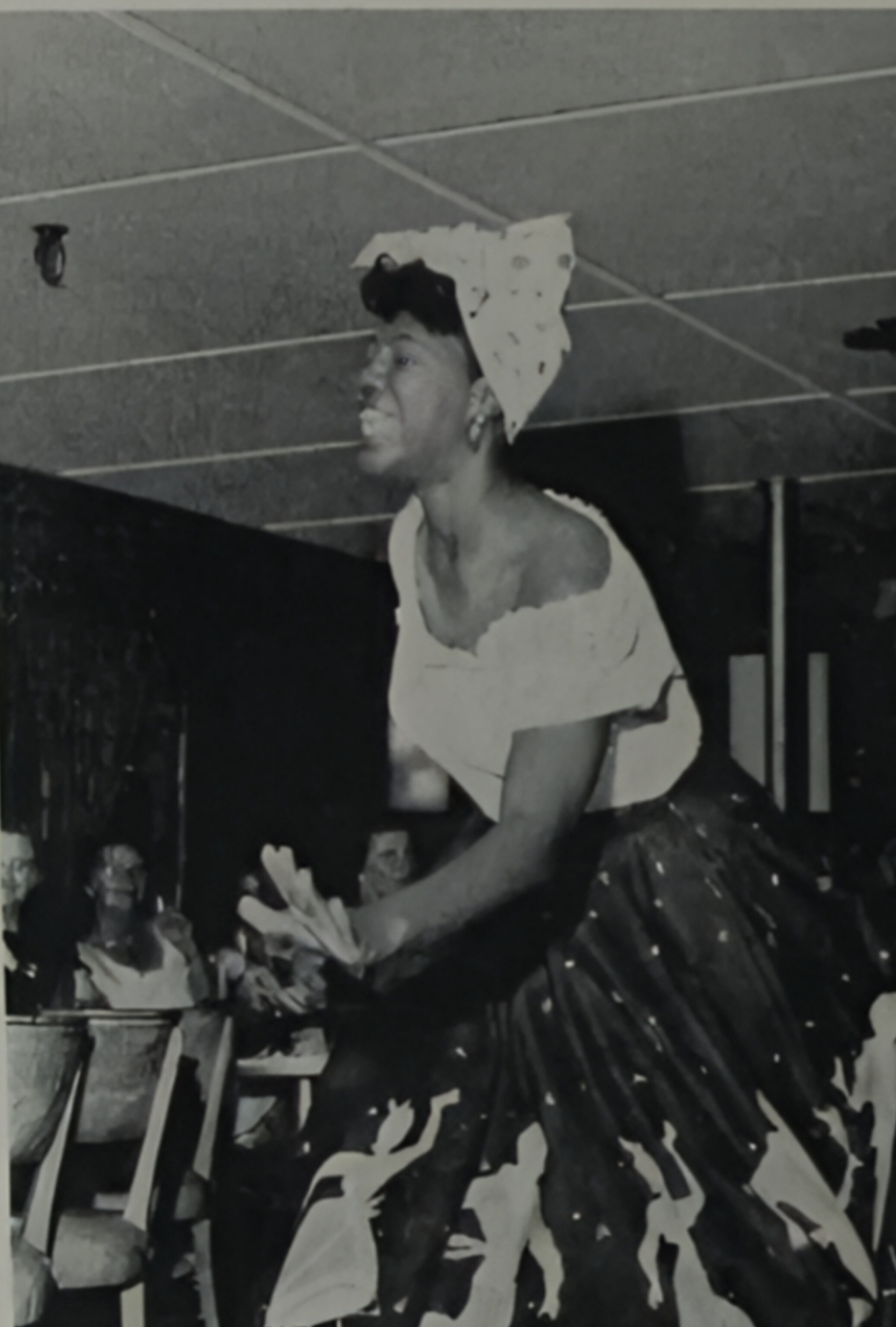

Background information
- Also known as: Calypso Mama; Bahama Mama
- Born: Maureen Verlene Duvalier; 14 May 1926; Nassau, Bahamas
- Died: 19 December 2014 (aged 88) Nassau, Bahamas
- Genres: Blues; calypso
- Instrument: Vocals

Maureen Duvalier MBE (14 May 1926 – 19 December 2014), also known by the stage names, Calypso Mama and Bahama Mama, was a Bahamian singer of blues and calypso music and a pioneer of junkanoo. Duvalier performed around the world and promoted the Bahamas on behalf of the Ministry of Tourism.

== Early life ==
Duvalier was born on 14 May 1926 on Burial Ground Corner in the Grants Town area of Nassau, Bahamas. Her mother was Ethel Bowleg and her father Eustace Edward Duvalier. Maureen's uncle was Freddie Bowleg and her godfather was the musician and parliamentarian Bert Cambridge. She was also distantly related to former Haitian dictator, François Duvalier.

Duvalier attended Western Senior School. She later studied drama at New York University from 1952 to 1954.

== Career ==
Duvalier began performing at venues around Nassau. She was discovered by Freddie Munnings Sr. and played with him at Nassau's Silver Slipper Night Club.

She became a junkanoo pioneer in 1958, when she was one of the first 25 women to perform in a Junkanoo parade and she was the first woman to lead a group. Duvalier appears in the 1958 film Island Women credited as Maurine Duvalier.

Duvalier went onto become a tourism representative, travelling around the world, to promote the Bahamas.

In 2004, she was made a Member of the Order of the British Empire (MBE) for services to music. In 2005, the new year's Junkanoo Parade was dedicated to Duvalier and called the Maureen Duvalier New Year's Day Parade.

After her retirement, she still performed twice a week at the Atlantis Resort.

== Death and personal life ==
On 19 December 2014 Duvalier died in Nassau aged 88. A memorial service was held on 2 January 2015 in the nation's principal civic plaza, Rawson Square. Funeral services were held on 4 January at St. Agnes Church, Grants Town. The Prime Minister, Perry Christie, delivered a eulogy. The funeral procession took the form of a junkanoo rush from the church to the Eastern Cemetery.

== Discography ==
=== Albums ===
- Calypso Mama – With Lad Richards’ Calypso Orchestra (1957).

=== Songs ===
- Yes, Yes, Yes (2:53)
- Ask Me Why I Run
- Court House Scandal

== Bibliography ==
- Sands, Rosita M., Maureen “Bahama Mama” DuValier, and Ronald Simms. “Junkanoo Past, Present, and Future.” The Black Perspective in Music 17, no. 1/2 (1989): 93–108.
