= A.E.S. Hudson Street =

1978 American TV series

- Genre: Situation comedy
- Created by: Danny Arnold; Tony Sheehan; Chris Hayward
- Directed by: Noam Pitlik
- Starring: Gregory Sierra; Rosanna DeSoto; Ray Stewart
- Theme music composer: Jack Elliott; Allyn Ferguson
- Country of origin: United States
- No. of seasons: 1
- No. of episodes: 5

Production
- Executive producer: Danny Arnold
- Producer: Roland Kibbee
- Running time: 24 mins.
- Production company: Four D Productions

Original release
- Network: ABC
- Release: March 16 – April 20, 1978

A.E.S. Hudson Street is an American comedy television show that aired on ABC in 1978 on Thursday night from 9:30 pm to 10:00 pm ET.

== Synopsis ==
The series follows the antics of the staff of a run-down Ambulance Emergency Service hospital on Hudson Street, on the lower west side of Manhattan. It was cancelled after five episodes.

== Cast and characters ==
- Gregory Sierra as Dr. Tony Menzies
- Bill Cort as Dr. Jerry Meckler
- Rosanna DeSoto as Nurse Rosa Santiago
- Ralph Manza as Ambulance Aide Stanke
- Allan Miller as Dr. Glick, the psychiatrist
- Susan Peretz as Foshko, the ambulance driver
- Barrie Youngfellow as Dr. Gloria Manners
- Ray Stewart as Nurse Newton
- Stefan Gierasch as J. Powell Karbow, the hospital administrator
- Bob Dishy as Dr. Friedman
- Julienne Wells as Nurse Rhonda Todd

== Pilot ==
The series pilot aired July 21, 1977, with F. Murray Abraham starring as Dr. Tony Menzies. When the five series episodes were filmed, only Dishy and Stewart remained from the original cast. All of the other characters were either dropped or re-cast. In the pilot, A.E.S. stood for Ambulance Emergency Service.

== Remake ==
The series was remade as Stat in 1991. That version lasted 6 episodes.
