= List of Fish episodes =

Fish is an American television series that aired in the United States on ABC. Starring Abe Vigoda as NYPD Detective Phil Fish, the series is a spin-off of the sitcom Barney Miller. It premiered on February 5, 1977 and ended on May 18, 1978, with a total of 35 episodes over the course of 2 seasons.

== Series overview ==
Season	Episodes	Originally released	
Season	Episodes	First released	Last released
1	13	February 5, 1977	August 13, 1977
2	22	September 17, 1977	May 18, 1978

== Episodes ==
=== Season 1 (1977) ===
No. overall	No. in season	Title	Directed by	Written by	Original release date
1	1	"The Really Longest Day"	Lee Bernhardi	Richard Baer, Barbara Avedon & Barbara Corday	February 5, 1977
Note: Art director Thomas Azzari won a Primetime Emmy Award in the "Outstanding Art Direction or Scenic Design for a Comedy Series" category for his work on this episode.
2	2	"The Car"	Lee Bernhardi	Tom Reeder	February 12, 1977
3	3	"Power Play"	Lee Bernhardi	Story by : Bruce Kane; Teleplay by : Bruce Kane, Barbara Avedon & Barbara Corday	February 19, 1977
4	4	"Cold Cash"	Lee Bernhardi	Story by : Bruce Kane; Teleplay by : Seth Freeman, Bruce Kane, Barbara Avedon & Barbara Corday	February 26, 1977
5	5	"Fish's Job"	Dennis Steinmetz	Barbara Avedon & Barbara Corday	March 12, 1977
6	6	"Bernice's Problem"	Lee Bernhardi	Tom Reeder	March 19, 1977
7	7	"The Neighbors"	Noam Pitlik	Howard Ostroff, Norman Barasch & Roy Kammerman	March 26, 1977
8	8	"Fire"	Dennis Steinmetz	Reinhold Weege	April 2, 1977
9	9	"The Social Worker"	Mark Warren	Story by : Laurence Marks; Teleplay by : Laurence Marks, Norman Barasch & Roy Kammerman	April 9, 1977
10	10	"Fish and Roots"	Mark Warren	Sheldon Bull	April 16, 1977
11	11	"Anniversary"	Jeremiah Morris	Barbara Avedon & Barbara Corday	April 30, 1977
12	12	"The Adoption"	Howard Storm	Reinhold Weege	June 2, 1977
13	13	"The New Kid"	Jeremiah Morris	Bill Idelson	August 17, 1977

=== Season 2 (1977–78) ===
No. overall	No. in season	Title	Directed by	Written by	Original release date
14	1	"The Missing Fish"	Jeremiah Morris	Norman Barasch & Roy Kammerman	September 17, 1977
15	2	"Retirement Blues"	Jeremiah Morris	Norman Barasch & Roy Kammerman	September 24, 1977
16	3	"Fish Behind Bars: Part 1"	Jeremiah Morris	Norman Barasch & Roy Kammerman	October 1, 1977
17	4	"Fish Behind Bars: Part 2"	Bob LaHendro	Norman Barasch & Roy Kammerman	October 8, 1977
18	5	"Fish and the Rock Star"	Bob LaHendro	Johnny Bonaduce	October 15, 1977
19	6	"Fish's Daughter"	John Robins	Norman Barasch & Roy Kammerman	October 22, 1977
20	7	"Jilly's Job"	Norman Abbott	Story by : Don Siegel, Michael Loman, Norman Barasch & Roy Kammerman; Teleplay by : Norman Barasch & Roy Kammerman	November 5, 1977
21	8	"Separation"	Noam Pitlik	Michael Loman	November 14, 1977
22	9	"A Fish Christmas"	Jeremiah Morris	Norman Barasch & Roy Kammerman	December 20, 1977
23	10	"Mike's Career"	Gary Shimokawa	Norman Barasch & Roy Kammerman	January 3, 1978
24	11	"Close Encounters of the Fishy Kind"	Jeremiah Morris	Arthur S. Rabin, Norman Barasch & Roy Kammerman	January 12, 1978
25	12	"The Million Dollar Misunderstanding"	Gary Shimokawa	Neil Rosen, George Tricker, Norman Barasch & Roy Kammerman	January 19, 1978
26	13	"A Fine Kettle of Fish"	Gary Shimokawa	Norman Barasch & Roy Kammerman	January 26, 1978
27	14	"Charlie Resigns"	Jeremiah Morris	Laurence Marks	February 2, 1978
28	15	"Love in Bloom"	Gary Shimokawa	Dave Hackel, Steve Hattman, Norman Barasch & Roy Kammerman	February 9, 1978
29	16	"It Shouldn't Happen to a Dog"	Gary Shimokawa	Arthur S. Rabin, Norman Barasch & Roy Kammerman	February 23, 1978
30	17	"Love Thy Neighbor"	Jeremiah Morris	Arthur S. Rabin	March 2, 1978
31	18	"Sweet Sixteen"	Gary Shimokawa	Norman Barasch & Roy Kammerman	March 9, 1978
32	19	"Fire and Ice"	Gary Shimokawa	Jim Rogers, Norman Barasch & Roy Kammerman	March 23, 1978
33	20	"A Pinch of Class"	John Tracy	Norman Barasch & Roy Kammerman	May 4, 1978
34	21	"For the Love of Mike"	John Tracy	Sheldon Bull	May 11, 1978
35	22	"Chief Fish"	Gary Shimokawa	Jim Rogers	May 18, 1978
