= Tony Sheehan (producer) =

American producer and screenwriter

- Education: Notre Dame High School
- Years active: 1975–present

Tony Sheehan is an American producer and screenwriter.

== Career ==
Sheehan started his career, as producing and writing for the television series Barney Miller, in 1975.

In 1977-1980s, Sheehan was nominated for an Primetime Emmy for Outstanding Writing in a Comedy Series for the episode Quarantine: Part 2 from Barney Miller. In 1977, he became a developer with Chris Hayward and Danny Arnold for the Barney Miller (spin-off) Fish, when Abe Vigoda (Phil Fish) left the series in Season 4 from Barney Miller.

In 1980s-2000s, Sheehan became an executive producer and screenwriter for the television series Mr. Belvedere. He left the series in Season 5, to create the new NBC sitcom television series Sister Kate, which he created with Frank Dungan and Jeff Stein. He also wrote for actress Tracey Ullman's HBO special Tracey Ullman Takes on New York, for which he won a Writers Guild of America Award, as well as wrote and produced on the first season of her award-winning show, Tracey Takes On... He also was an executive producer for The King of Queens, in 1998.

In 2016, Sheehan became an executive producer for the revival of The King of Queens titled Kevin Can Wait.
