= Joanne Gilbert =

American actress (1932–2025)

- Born: July 17, 1932; Chicago, Illinois, U.S.
- Died: April 16, 2025 (aged 92); Los Angeles, California, U.S.
- Occupations: Actress, singer
- Years active: 1953–1966
- Spouses: Danny Arnold (m. 1955–1956); Edward L. Rissien (m. 1958–1964)

Joanne Beverly Gilbert (July 17, 1932 – April 16, 2025) was an American actress and singer who appeared in the Hollywood Golden Age of films and television.

== Life and career ==
Gilbert was born on July 17, 1932 in Chicago, Illinois, and grew up in Hollywood, California. She was the daughter of American lyricist Ray Gilbert best-known for writing the lyrics of the song Zip-a-Dee-Doo-Dah, and the stepdaughter of actress/singer Janis Paige.

She pursued an unsuccessful career as a fashion model in New York City, and then moved back to California, performing as a nightclub singer before becoming a film actress. Her movies include Red Garters starring Rosemary Clooney and Jack Carson, and The Great Man. Her last film performance was in The High Cost of Loving in 1958. She worked for much of the following decade in television.

Gilbert was married to screenwriter Danny Arnold and producer Edward Louis Rissien. Both unions were childless.

Gilbert died in Los Angeles on April 16, 2025, at the age of 92.

== Selected filmography ==
- Houdini (1953) – girl (uncredited)
- Red Garters (1954) – Sheila Winthrop
- The Ford Television Theatre (1954) – Mary-Jo Dixon (episode: "The Mason-Dixon Line")
- Good Morning, Miss Dove (1955) – school girl (uncredited)
- The Great Man (1956) – Ginny
- Ride Out for Revenge (1957) – Pretty Willow
- The High Cost of Loving (1958) – Syd Heyward
- Perry Mason (1959) – Faith Foster (episode: "The Case of the Lost Last Act")
- Zane Grey Theater (1958) – Jennie Cannon (episode: "Utopia, Wyoming")
- The Outer Limits (1963) – Barbara Scott (episode: "O.B.I.T.")
- Ben Casey (1966) – Miss Clauson (episode: "Smile, Baby, Smile, It's Only Twenty Dols of Pain")
