= Tony Sheehan =

Tony Sheehan is the name of:

- Tony Sheehan (politician) (born 1948), Australian politician
- Tony Sheehan (producer), American producer and screenwriter
