= Florence Stanley =

American actress (1924–2003)

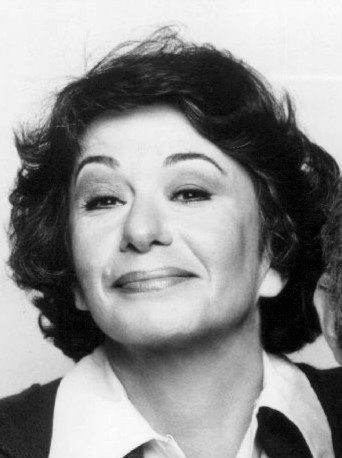
- Stanley in 1977
- Born: Florence Lenore Schwartz; July 1, 1924; Chicago, Illinois, U.S.
- Died: October 3, 2003 (aged 79); Los Angeles, California, U.S.
- Education: Northwestern University
- Occupation: Actress
- Years active: 1940–2003
- Spouse: Martin Newman (m. 1951)
- Children: 2
- Website: www.florencestanley.com

Florence Stanley (born Florence Lenore Schwartz; July 1, 1924 – October 3, 2003) was an American actress of stage, film, and television. She is best known for her roles in Barney Miller (1975–1977) and its spinoff Fish (1977–1978), My Two Dads (1987–1990), and Nurses (1991–1994), and the voice of Wilhelmina Bertha Packard in the franchise of Atlantis: The Lost Empire.

== Early life and career ==
Born in Chicago, Illinois, to Jacob Schwartz and Hanna Weil, Stanley attended Senn High School and Northwestern University.

Stanley began performing professionally in the 1940s. Her earliest theatrical performances include The Importance of Being Earnest with the Touring Players, Bury The Dead at New York's Cherry Lane Theatre, and Machinal. She began using the stage-name Florence Stanley at some point in her career.

During the 1950s, Stanley appeared in numerous live TV shows, and gave an acclaimed performance as Clytemnestra in the New York Shakespeare Festival's 1964 production of Electra, opposite Lee Grant, who played the title role. Stanley began her long career on Broadway as Maureen Stapleton's understudy in a 1965 revival of The Glass Menagerie.

In 1966, she took over the role of Yente in Broadway's Fiddler On The Roof from Bea Arthur, leaving in 1971 (after more than 2,000 performances) to open in Neil Simon's The Prisoner of Second Avenue, directed by Mike Nichols. In 1972, she went on to tap dance in the Broadway production of The Secret Affairs Of Mildred Wild, and in 1981 went back to work for Neil Simon in the Broadway production of Fools.

== Film roles ==
Her film roles began in 1967 with Up the Down Staircase starring Sandy Dennis. In 1973, she was asked by director Mike Nichols to play a small role in his film The Day of the Dolphin starring George C. Scott. She recreated her role in the film version of The Prisoner of Second Avenue (1975), and was again cast by Nichols for The Fortune (1975), starring Warren Beatty, Jack Nicholson and Stockard Channing. She went on to appear in the television series Joe and Sons for CBS in 1975; that same year Barney Miller producer Danny Arnold cast Stanley as Bernice Fish, the wife of Detective Fish (played by Abe Vigoda). Vigoda's and Stanley's characters were spun off in 1977 – Fish. She also appeared in the 1994 film Trapped in Paradise starring Nicolas Cage, Jon Lovitz and Dana Carvey. Stanley played Edna "Ma" Firpo in the movie.

== Later roles ==
In 1966 she was a voice actress on the gothic inspired soap opera Dark Shadows voicing the supposed ghost of a sobbing woman in the basement.

On television, Stanley portrayed Margaret Wilbur, a family court judge who assigned custody of a twelve-year-old girl to two former boyfriends of the girl's late mother on My Two Dads, and directed several episodes of the series. She made two guest appearances on the TV series Night Court: the first in the season 4 episode "Murder" in which she played Mrs. Rothman, a woman who cheerfully confesses to her husband's murder but may be hiding something, and another in the season 6 episode "The Game Show" where she played Judge Wilbur. She later played Dr. Amanda Riskin on Nurses. She portrayed Elsie Engelhoff on Drexell's Class provided the voice for Grandma Ethyl Phillips on Dinosaurs and made guest appearances on such television series as Mad About You (which reunited her with her former My Two Dads co-star, Paul Reiser), Malcolm in the Middle, Mr. Belvedere and Cybill. Later film roles include Trouble Bound (1993), The Odd Couple II and Bulworth (both in 1998) and Down With Love (2003). Stanley also provided the voice for Peter Griffin's mother, Thelma on Family Guy. In 1998, she played Muriel on The Simple Life.

In 2001, she provided the voice of Wilhelmina Packard in Disney's animated film, Atlantis: The Lost Empire, for which she was nominated for an Annie Award for Voice Acting by a Female Performer in an Animated Feature Production, and the direct-to-video sequel, Atlantis: Milo's Return, in 2003.

== Death ==
On October 3, 2003, at age 79, Stanley died of complications from a stroke at Cedars Sinai Medical Center in Los Angeles.

== Partial filmography ==
| Year | Title | Role | Notes |
|---|---|---|---|
| 1967 | Up the Down Staircase | Ella Friedenberg | |
| 1970 | Jenny | Woman at Playground | Uncredited |
| 1973 | The Day of the Dolphin | Women's Club | |
| 1975 | The Prisoner of Second Avenue | Pearl | |
| 1975 | The Fortune | Mrs. Gould | |
| 1987 | Outrageous Fortune | Ticket Agent | |
| 1991 | Dinosaurs | Ethyl Hinkleman Phillips | Voice |
| 1993 | Trouble Bound | Grandma Martucci | |
| 1994 | Trapped in Paradise | Ma Firpo | |
| 1995 | A Goofy Movie | Waitress | Voice |
| 1998 | The Odd Couple II | Hattie | |
| 1998 | Bulworth | Dobish | |
| 2000 | The Brainiacs.com | Grandma Tyler | |
| 2001 | Atlantis: The Lost Empire | Mrs. Packard | Voice |
| 2001 | According to Spencer | Grandma | |
| 2003 | Down with Love | Dry Cleaner's Wife | |
| 2003 | Atlantis: Milo's Return | Mrs. Packard | Voice, final film role |
