= List of Barney Miller episodes =

Barney Miller is an American sitcom television series set in a New York City Police Department police station in Greenwich Village. The series originally was broadcast from January 23, 1975, to May 20, 1982, on ABC. It was created by Danny Arnold and Theodore J. Flicker. Noam Pitlik directed the majority of the episodes.

== Series overview ==
Season	Episodes	Originally released		Rank	Rating
Season	Episodes	First released	Last released	Rank	Rating
1	13	January 23, 1975	May 1, 1975	68	14.7
2	22	September 11, 1975	March 18, 1976	37	—N/a
3	22	September 23, 1976	March 31, 1977	17	22.2
4	23	September 15, 1977	May 18, 1978	17	21.4 (Note: Tied with Fantasy Island.)
5	24	September 14, 1978	May 17, 1979	15	22.6 (Note: Tied with The ABC Sunday Night Movie.)
6	22	September 13, 1979	May 8, 1980	20	20.9 (Note: Tied with Charlie's Angels.)
7	22	October 30, 1980	May 21, 1981	34	18.4
8	22	October 29, 1981	May 20, 1982	54	—N/a

== Episodes ==
=== Pilot (1974) ===
"The Life and Times of Captain Barney Miller" aired on August 22, 1974, as part of an ABC summer anthology series, Just for Laughs.

=== Season 1 (1975) ===
No. overall	No. in season	Title	Directed by	Written by	Original release date
1	1	"Ramon"	Bill Davis	Theodore J. Flicker & Danny Arnold	January 23, 1975
2	2	"Experience"	Danny Arnold	Steve Gordon	January 30, 1975
3	3	"Snow Job"	Richard Kinon	Ron Friedman & Danny Arnold & Chris Hayward	February 6, 1975
4	4	"Graft"	Noam Pitlik	Story by : Lila Garrett & Sandford Krinski; Teleplay by : Danny Arnold & Chris Hayward	February 13, 1975
5	5	"The Courtesans"	Noam Pitlik	Story by : Sanford Krinski & Jerome L. Davis; Teleplay by : Jerome L. Davis & Chris Hayward & Danny Arnold & Sybil Adelman	February 20, 1975
6	6	"Stakeout"	John Rich	Danny Arnold	February 27, 1975
7	7	"Bureaucrat"	Bob Finkel	Richard Baer & Chris Hayward & Danny Arnold	March 6, 1975
8	8	"Ms. Cop"	Noam Pitlik	Chris Hayward & Danny Arnold	March 13, 1975
9	9	"Vigilante"	Noam Pitlik	Story by : Howard Albrecht & Sol Weinstein; Teleplay by : Danny Arnold & Chris Hayward	March 20, 1975
10	10	"The Guest"	Noam Pitlik	Danny Arnold & Chris Hayward & William Taub	March 27, 1975
11	11	"Escape Artist"	Noam Pitlik	Howard Leeds & Danny Arnold & Chris Hayward	April 10, 1975
12	12	"Hair"	Allen Baron	Story by : Jerry Ross; Teleplay by : Ron Pearlman & Danny Arnold & Chris Hayward	April 17, 1975
13	13	"The Hero"	Noam Pitlik	Danny Arnold & Chris Hayward	May 1, 1975

=== Season 2 (1975–76) ===
No. overall	No. in season	Title	Directed by	Written by	Original release date
14	1	"Doomsday"	Noam Pitlik	Danny Arnold, Chris Hayward & Arne Sultan	September 11, 1975
15	2	"The Social Worker"	Noam Pitlik	Danny Arnold, Chris Hayward & Arne Sultan	September 18, 1975
16	3	"The Layoff"	Noam Pitlik	Danny Arnold, Chris Hayward & Arne Sultan	September 25, 1975
17	4	"Ambush"	Noam Pitlik	Danny Arnold, Chris Hayward & Arne Sultan	October 2, 1975
18	5	"Heat Wave"	Noam Pitlik	Story by : Danny Arnold, Chris Hayward & Arne Sultan; Teleplay by : Danny Arnold & Chris Hayward	October 9, 1975
19	6	"The Arsonist"	Noam Pitlik	Tony Sheehan	October 16, 1975
20	7	"Grand Hotel"	Noam Pitlik	Story by : Danny Arnold & Chris Hayward; Teleplay by : Danny Arnold, Chris Hayward & Arne Sultan	October 23, 1975
21	8	"Discovery"	Lee Bernhardi	Tom Reeder, Danny Arnold & Chris Hayward	October 30, 1975
22	9	"You Dirty Rat"	Noam Pitlik	Story by : Arne Sultan; Teleplay by : Arne Sultan, Chris Hayward & Danny Arnold	November 13, 1975
23	10	"Horse Thief"	Noam Pitlik	Tony Sheehan	November 20, 1975
24	11	"Rain"	Noam Pitlik	Story by : Danny Arnold & Chris Hayward; Teleplay by : Tony Sheehan	November 27, 1975
25	12	"Fish"	Noam Pitlik	Danny Arnold, Chris Hayward & Herbert Baker	December 4, 1975
26	13	"Hot Dogs"	Lee Bernhardi	Story by : Chris Hayward, Danny Arnold & Arne Sultan; Teleplay by : Tony Sheehan	December 11, 1975
27	14	"Protection"	Noam Pitlik	Story by : Danny Arnold, Chris Hayward & Tom Reeder; Teleplay by : Tom Reeder	December 18, 1975
28	15	"Happy New Year"	Bruce Bilson	Danny Arnold, Chris Hayward & Arne Sultan	January 8, 1976
29	16	"Sniper"	Lee Bernhardi	Tom Reeder, Danny Arnold & Chris Hayward	January 22, 1976
30	17	"Fear of Flying"	Lee Bernhardi	Reinhold Weege	January 29, 1976
31	18	"Block Party"	Noam Pitlik	Tom Reeder	February 12, 1976
32	19	"Massage Parlor"	Dennis Steinmetz	Tony Sheehan	February 19, 1976
33	20	"The Psychiatrist"	Noam Pitlik	Story by : Gregory Tiefer; Teleplay by : Tony Sheehan, Danny Arnold & Chris Hayward	February 26, 1976
34	21	"The Kid"	Stan Lathan	Tony Sheehan, Chris Hayward & Danny Arnold	March 4, 1976
35	22	"The Mole"	Mark Warren	Reinhold Weege, Chris Hayward & Danny Arnold	March 18, 1976

=== Season 3 (1976–77) ===
No. overall	No. in season	Title	Directed by	Written by	Original release date
36	1	"Evacuation"	Noam Pitlik	Story by : Chris Hayward & Danny Arnold; Teleplay by : Danny Arnold	September 23, 1976
37	2	"Quarantine: Part 1"	Lee Bernhardi	Tony Sheehan	September 30, 1976
38	3	"Quarantine: Part 2"	Noam Pitlik	Tony Sheehan & Danny Arnold	October 7, 1976
39	4	"Bus Stop"	Noam Pitlik	Story by : Reinhold Weege & Chris Hayward & Danny Arnold; Teleplay by : Tony Sheehan & Danny Arnold & Reinhold Weege & Jerry Ross	October 14, 1976
40	5	"The Election"	Lee Bernhardi	Tom Reeder	October 21, 1976
41	6	"Werewolf"	Noam Pitlik	Story by : Seymour Blicker & Tony Sheehan; Teleplay by : Tony Sheehan & Reinhold Weege & Danny Arnold & Seymour Blicker	October 28, 1976
42	7	"The Recluse"	Bruce Bilson	Story by : Chris Hayward & Reinhold Weege; Teleplay by : Reinhold Weege & Danny Arnold	November 11, 1976
43	8	"Noninvolvement"	Bruce Bilson	Story by : Chris Hayward & Danny Arnold & Reinhold Weege; Teleplay by : Reinhold Weege	November 18, 1976
44	9	"Power Failure"	Noam Pitlik	Story by : Reinhold Weege & Danny Arnold & Tony Sheehan; Teleplay by : Tony Sheehan & Danny Arnold	December 9, 1976
45	10	"Christmas Story"	Bruce Bilson	Reinhold Weege & Tony Sheehan	December 23, 1976
46	11	"Hash"	Noam Pitlik	Tom Reeder	December 30, 1976
47	12	"Smog Alert"	Bruce Bilson	Story by : Chris Hayward & Danny Arnold; Teleplay by : Reinhold Weege	January 6, 1977
48	13	"Community Relations"	Noam Pitlik	Story by : Winston Moss & Tony Sheehan; Teleplay by : Tony Sheehan & Larry Balmagia & Dennis Koenig	January 13, 1977
49	14	"The Rand Report"	Noam Pitlik	Story by : Roland Kibbee & Reinhold Weege; Teleplay by : Reinhold Weege	January 20, 1977
50	15	"Fire '77"	Bruce Bilson	Tony Sheehan	January 27, 1977
51	16	"Abduction"	Bruce Bilson	Story by : Tom Reeder; Teleplay by : Tony Sheehan & Reinhold Weege & Tom Reeder	February 3, 1977
52	17	"Sex Surrogate"	Noam Pitlik	Story by : Jerry Ross & Tony Sheehan; Teleplay by : Tony Sheehan & Larry Balmagia & Dennis Koenig	February 10, 1977
53	18	"Moonlighting"	Noam Pitlik	Reinhold Weege	February 17, 1977
54	19	"Asylum"	Danny Arnold & Alex March	Story by : Roland Kibbee; Teleplay by : Roland Kibbee & Danny Arnold & Reinhold Weege & Tony Sheehan	February 24, 1977
55	20	"Group Home"	Lee Bernhardi	Story by : Larry Balmagia & Dennis Koenig; Teleplay by : Danny Arnold & Tony Sheehan	March 10, 1977
56	21	"Strike: Part 1"	Jeremiah Morris	Story by : Larry Balmagia & Dennis Koenig; Teleplay by : Reinhold Weege	March 24, 1977
57	22	"Strike: Part 2"	Danny Arnold	Story by : Larry Balmagia & Dennis Koenig; Teleplay by : Tony Sheehan & Danny Arnold & Reinhold Weege	March 31, 1977

=== Season 4 (1977–78) ===
No. overall	No. in season	Title	Directed by	Written by	Original release date
58	1	"Goodbye, Mr. Fish: Part 1"	Danny Arnold	Reinhold Weege & Danny Arnold	September 15, 1977
59	2	"Goodbye, Mr. Fish: Part 2"	Danny Arnold	Reinhold Weege	September 22, 1977
60	3	"Bugs"	David Swift	Larry Balmagia, Dennis Koenig & Tony Sheehan	September 29, 1977
61	4	"Corporation"	Hal Linden	Story by : Lee H. Grant; Teleplay by : Lee H. Grant, Tony Sheehan & Danny Arnold	October 6, 1977
62	5	"Burial"	Danny Arnold	Michael Russnow	October 13, 1977
63	6	"Copy Cat"	Jeremiah Morris	Douglas Wyman & Tony Sheehan	October 27, 1977
64	7	"Blizzard"	Danny Arnold	Tony Sheehan	November 3, 1977
65	8	"Chase"	Jeremiah Morris	Tom Reeder, Danny Arnold & Reinhold Weege	November 17, 1977
66	9	"Thanksgiving Story"	David Swift	Reinhold Weege	November 24, 1977
67	10	"Tunnel"	David Swift	Story by : Michael Russnow; Teleplay by : Michael Russnow & Tony Sheehan	December 1, 1977
68	11	"Atomic Bomb"	Noam Pitlik	Reinhold Weege & Tom Reeder	December 15, 1977
69	12	"The Bank"	Noam Pitlik	Tony Sheehan	January 5, 1978
70	13	"The Ghost"	Lee Bernhardi	Reinhold Weege	January 12, 1978
71	14	"Appendicitis"	Noam Pitlik	Tony Sheehan	January 19, 1978
72	15	"Rape"	Noam Pitlik	Dennis Koenig	January 26, 1978
73	16	"Eviction: Part 1"	Noam Pitlik	Story by : Tom Reeder; Teleplay by : Tony Sheehan & Tom Reeder	February 2, 1978
74	17	"Eviction: Part 2"	Noam Pitlik	Reinhold Weege & Tom Reeder	February 9, 1978
75	18	"Wojo's Problem"	Max Gail	Tony Sheehan	February 23, 1978
76	19	"Quo Vadis?"	Alex March	Story by : Douglas Wyman & Tony Sheehan; Teleplay by : Tony Sheehan	March 2, 1978
77	20	"Hostage"	Hal Linden	Story by : Chris Hayward & Reinhold Weege; Teleplay by : Reinhold Weege	March 23, 1978
78	21	"Evaluation"	Noam Pitlik	Larry Balmagia	May 4, 1978
79	22	"The Sighting"	Alex March	Story by : Reinhold Weege & Carol Gary; Teleplay by : Tony Sheehan	May 11, 1978
80	23	"Inauguration"	Alex March	Reinhold Weege & Carol Gary	May 18, 1978

=== Season 5 (1978–79) ===
No. overall	No. in season	Title	Directed by	Written by	Original release date
81–82	1–2	"Kidnapping"	Noam Pitlik	Danny Arnold, Reinhold Weege & Tony Sheehan	September 14, 1978
83	3	"The Search"	Noam Pitlik	Story by : Bob Colleary; Teleplay by : Bob Colleary & Tony Sheehan	September 21, 1978
84	4	"Dog Days"	Noam Pitlik	Reinhold Weege	September 28, 1978
85	5	"The Baby Broker"	Noam Pitlik	Tony Sheehan	October 5, 1978
86	6	"Accusation"	Max Gail	Wally Dalton & Shelley Zellman	October 12, 1978
87	7	"The Prisoner"	Noam Pitlik	Reinhold Weege, Wally Dalton & Shelley Zellman	October 19, 1978
88	8	"Loan Shark"	Noam Pitlik	Story by : Judith Anne Nielsen, Richard William Beban, Mario Roccuzzo & Bob Colleary; Teleplay by : Tony Sheehan	November 2, 1978
89	9	"The Vandal"	Noam Pitlik	Dennis Koenig & Tony Sheehan	November 9, 1978
90	10	"The Harris Incident"	Noam Pitlik	Reinhold Weege, Wally Dalton & Shelley Zellman	November 30, 1978
91	11	"The Radical"	Noam Pitlik	Story by : Lee H. Grant; Teleplay by : Tony Sheehan	December 7, 1978
92	12	"Toys"	Noam Pitlik	Story by : Wally Dalton & Shelley Zellman; Teleplay by : Wally Dalton & Shelley Zellman & Tony Sheehan	December 14, 1978
93	13	"The Indian"	Noam Pitlik	Story by : Richard William Beban, Judith Anne Nielsen & Reinhold Weege; Teleplay by : Reinhold Weege	January 4, 1979
94	14	"Voice Analyzer"	Noam Pitlik	Story by : James Bonnet; Teleplay by : James Bonnet & Reinhold Weege	January 11, 1979
95	15	"The Spy"	Noam Pitlik	Tony Sheehan	January 18, 1979
96–97	16–17	"Wojo's Girl"	Noam Pitlik	Tony Sheehan & Danny Arnold	January 25, 1979
98	18	"Middle Age"	Noam Pitlik	Story by : Wally Dalton & Shelley Zellman; Teleplay by : Reinhold Weege & Danny Arnold	February 1, 1979
99	19	"The Counterfeiter"	Max Gail	Reinhold Weege, Frank Dungan & Jeff Stein	February 8, 1979
100	20	"Open House"	Noam Pitlik	Tony Sheehan, Wally Dalton & Shelley Zellman	February 15, 1979
101	21	"Identity"	Noam Pitlik	Tom Reeder	March 1, 1979
102	22	"Computer Crime"	Max Gail	Story by : Dennis Koenig & Calvin Kelly; Teleplay by : Calvin Kelly	March 15, 1979
103	23	"Graveyard Shift"	Noam Pitlik	Tony Sheehan	May 10, 1979
104	24	"Jack Soo, a Retrospective"	Noam Pitlik	(Unlisted)	May 17, 1979

=== Season 6 (1979–80) ===
No. overall	No. in season	Title	Directed by	Written by	Original release date
105	1	"Inquisition"	Noam Pitlik	Story by : Calvin Kelly & Jim Tisdale; Teleplay by : Tony Sheehan	September 13, 1979
106	2	"The Photographer"	Noam Pitlik	Bob Colleary	September 20, 1979
107	3	"Vacation"	Noam Pitlik	Frank Dungan & Jeff Stein	September 27, 1979
108	4	"The Brother"	Noam Pitlik	Shelley Zellman & Wally Dalton	October 4, 1979
109	5	"The Slave"	Noam Pitlik	Frank Dungan & Jeff Stein	October 18, 1979
110	6	"Strip Joint"	Noam Pitlik	Jaie Brashar, Frank Dungan & Jeff Stein	November 1, 1979
111	7	"The Bird"	Noam Pitlik	Story by : Richard W. Beban, Judith Anne Nielsen, Frank Dungan & Jeff Stein; Teleplay by : Frank Dungan & Jeff Stein	November 8, 1979
112	8	"The Desk"	Noam Pitlik	Frank Dungan & Jeff Stein	November 22, 1979
113	9	"The Judge"	Noam Pitlik	Frank Dungan, Jeff Stein & Tony Sheehan	December 6, 1979
114	10	"The DNA Story"	Noam Pitlik	Story by : Rich Reinhart & Jaie Brasher; Teleplay by : Rich Reinhart	December 13, 1979
115	11	"The Dentist"	Noam Pitlik	Frank Dungan & Jeff Stein	December 27, 1979
116	12	"People's Court"	Noam Pitlik	Frank Dungan & Jeff Stein	January 3, 1980
117	13	"Vanished: Part 1"	Noam Pitlik	Tony Sheehan & Frank Dungan & Jeff Stein	January 10, 1980
118	14	"Vanished: Part 2"	Noam Pitlik	Tony Sheehan & Frank Dungan & Jeff Stein	January 17, 1980
119	15	"The Child Stealers"	Noam Pitlik	Frank Dungan & Jeff Stein	January 24, 1980
120	16	"Guns"	Noam Pitlik	Rich Reinhart, Frank Dungan, Jeff Stein & Tony Sheehan	January 31, 1980
121	17	"Uniform Days"	Noam Pitlik	Richard Beban & Judith Neilsen	February 7, 1980
122	18	"Dietrich's Arrest: Part 1"	Noam Pitlik	Tony Sheehan & Frank Dungan & Jeff Stein	February 28, 1980
123	19	"Dietrich's Arrest: Part 2"	Noam Pitlik	Tony Sheehan & Frank Dungan & Jeff Stein	March 6, 1980
124	20	"The Architect"	Noam Pitlik	Story by : Calvin Kelly & Jim Tisdale; Teleplay by : Frank Dungan, Jeff Stein & Tony Sheehan	March 27, 1980
125	21	"The Inventor"	Noam Pitlik	Tony Sheehan & Frank Dungan & Jeff Stein	May 1, 1980
126	22	"Fog"	Noam Pitlik	Story by : Mark Brull; Teleplay by : Frank Dungan, Jeff Stein & Tony Sheehan	May 8, 1980

=== Season 7 (1980–81) ===
No. overall	No. in season	Title	Directed by	Written by	Original release date
127	1	"Homicide: Part 1"	Noam Pitlik	Jeff Stein & Frank Dungan	October 30, 1980
128	2	"Homicide: Part 2"	Noam Pitlik	Jeff Stein & Frank Dungan	November 6, 1980
129	3	"The Delegate"	Noam Pitlik	Jim Tisdale	November 13, 1980
130	4	"Dorsey"	Noam Pitlik	Tony Sheehan	November 27, 1980
131	5	"Agent Orange"	Noam Pitlik	Tony Sheehan	December 11, 1980
132	6	"Call Girl"	Noam Pitlik	Jeff Stein & Frank Dungan	December 18, 1980
133	7	"Resignation"	Noam Pitlik	Jeff Stein & Frank Dungan	January 8, 1981
134	8	"Field Associate"	Noam Pitlik	Jordan Moffet	January 15, 1981
135	9	"Movie: Part 1"	Noam Pitlik	Jeff Stein & Frank Dungan	January 22, 1981
136	10	"Movie: Part 2"	Noam Pitlik	Jeff Stein & Frank Dungan	January 29, 1981
137	11	"The Psychic"	Noam Pitlik	Jeff Stein, Frank Dungan & Tony Sheehan	February 5, 1981
138	12	"Stormy Weather"	Noam Pitlik	Nat Mauldin	February 12, 1981
139	13	"The Librarian"	Noam Pitlik	Tony Sheehan & Jeff Stein & Frank Dungan	February 19, 1981
140	14	"Rachel"	Homer Powell	Tony Sheehan & Jeff Stein & Frank Dungan	February 26, 1981
141	15	"Contempt: Part 1"	Noam Pitlik	Frank Dungan & Jeff Stein	March 12, 1981
142	16	"Contempt: Part 2"	Noam Pitlik	Frank Dungan & Jeff Stein	March 19, 1981
143	17	"The Doll"	Noam Pitlik	Story by : Jordan Moffet & Nat Mauldin; Teleplay by : Tony Sheehan	March 26, 1981
144	18	"Lady and the Bomb"	Noam Pitlik	Lee H. Grant	April 9, 1981
145	19	"Riot"	Noam Pitlik	Story by : Greg Giangregorio; Teleplay by : Frank Dungan & Jeff Stein	April 30, 1981
146	20	"The Vests"	Noam Pitlik	Nat Mauldin	May 7, 1981
147	21	"The Rainmaker"	Noam Pitlik	Story by : Paul Robinson Hunter & Jeff Stein & Frank Dungan; Teleplay by : Jeff Stein & Frank Dungan	May 14, 1981
148	22	"Liquidation"	Noam Pitlik	Jeff Stein & Frank Dungan	May 21, 1981

=== Season 8 (1981–82) ===
No. overall	No. in season	Title	Directed by	Written by	Original release date
149	1	"Paternity"	Danny Arnold	Nat Mauldin	October 29, 1981
150	2	"Advancement"	Danny Arnold	Frank Dungan & Jeff Stein	November 5, 1981
151	3	"The Car"	Bruce Bilson	Nat Mauldin	November 12, 1981
152	4	"Possession"	Bruce Bilson	Tom Reeder & Roland Kibbee	November 19, 1981
153	5	"Stress Analyzer"	Bruce Bilson	Nat Mauldin	November 26, 1981
154	6	"Games"	Gennaro Montanino	Jordan Moffet	December 10, 1981
155	7	"Homeless"	Lee Lochhead	Jordan Moffet, Frank Dungan & Jeff Stein	December 17, 1981
156	8	"The Tontine"	Homer Powell	Story by : Dick Wesson & Nat Mauldin; Teleplay by : Nat Mauldin	January 7, 1982
157	9	"Examination Day"	Gennaro Montanino	Jordan Moffet	January 14, 1982
158	10	"The Clown"	Alan Bergmann	Sam Simon	January 21, 1982
159	11	"Chinatown: Part 1"	Danny Arnold	Jeff Stein & Frank Dungan	February 4, 1982
160	12	"Chinatown: Part 2"	Danny Arnold	Jeff Stein & Frank Dungan	February 11, 1982
161	13	"Hunger Strike"	Tony Sheehan	Story by : Stephen Neigher & Tony Sheehan; Teleplay by : Tony Sheehan	February 18, 1982
162	14	"Arrival"	Lee Lochhead	Jordan Moffet	February 25, 1982
163	15	"Obituary"	Gennaro Montanino	Nat Mauldin	March 11, 1982
164	16	"Inquiry"	Gennaro Montanino	Jeff Stein & Frank Dungan	March 26, 1982
165	17	"Old Love"	Hal Linden	Phillip Jayson Lasker	April 2, 1982
166	18	"Altercation"	Alan Bergmann	Tony Sheehan	April 9, 1982
167	19	"Bones"	Max Gail	Story by : Lee H. Grant, Jordan Moffet & Nat Mauldin; Teleplay by : Jordan Moffet & Nat Mauldin	April 29, 1982
168	20	"Landmark: Part 1"	Tony Sheehan	Tony Sheehan	May 6, 1982
169	21	"Landmark: Part 2"	Danny Arnold	Jeff Stein & Frank Dungan	May 13, 1982
170	22	"Landmark: Part 3"	Danny Arnold	Jeff Stein, Frank Dungan & Tony Sheehan	May 20, 1982
