= Jeremiah Morris =

American actor

Jeremiah Morris (born Jerome Maurice Gomberg, April 4, 1929, in the Bronx, New York; died March 5, 2006, in Culver City, California) was an American actor and television and theater director. Morris, influential in Los Angeles theater, appeared in Broadway plays and on popular television series for close to 40 years and directed television and theater productions.

== Career ==
A New York City native, Morris began working in the theater in the 1950s, appearing as an actor in a number of Broadway plays including a 1961 production of Daughter of Silence by Morris West and based on West's novel. He also appeared in Jennie, a 1963 musical starring Mary Martin. During that period, he worked as a television actor, making guest appearances on Naked City, The Honeymooners, Car 54, Where Are You?, WKRP in Cincinnati. He continued his television acting career through the 1990s, with guest roles on Cheers, Mad About You, NewsRadio and Frasier. He also directed episodes of Barney Miller, Fish, Diff'rent Strokes, Too Close for Comfort, Quincy, M.E. and Tony Orlando and Dawn, among other series.

In his theater work, Morris focused on directing from the early 1970s. One of his first major assignments was directing the touring production of Neil Simon's The Gingerbread Lady in 1972. In 1973 he directed Anne Meara and Jerry Stiller in a production of The Prisoner Of Second Avenue that toured the midwest including the infamous Kenley Playhouse in Warren, Ohio. All in all, he helmed hundreds of productions, on and off Broadway, on national tours and in regional theaters, directing legends such as Al Pacino, Jose Ferrer and Mickey Rooney.

In 1989, Morris accepted a job as artistic director of the Actors Alley theater in the San Fernando Valley. During his more than 10 years with the company, the eclectic program list featured works by George Bernard Shaw and Charles Dickens as well as modern plays, including Susan Sandler's Crossing Delancey, produced in partnership with the University of Judaism (now the American Jewish University). The Actors Alley moved into the historic El Portal Theatre in North Hollywood in 1995 and performed in a small space for several years until the main stage was renovated. Morris left the artistic director post in 2000.
