= Sister Kate (TV series) =

American sitcom

- Genre: Sitcom
- Created by: Frank Dungan; Tony Sheehan; Jeff Stein
- Written by: Frank Dungan; Jeff Stein; Tony Sheehan
- Directed by: Jeffrey Melman; Noam Pitlik; John Sgueglia
- Starring: Stephanie Beacham; Jason Priestley; Erin Reed; Hannah Cutrona; Penina Segall; Harley Cross; Alexaundria Simmons; Joel Robinson
- Theme music composer: Mason Cooper and Brian Rawlings
- Opening theme: "Maybe An Angel" performed by Amy Grant
- Composers: Brian Rawlings and Mason Cooper
- Country of origin: United States
- Original language: English
- No. of seasons: 1
- No. of episodes: 19

Production
- Executive producers: Frank Dungan; Jeff Stein; Tony Sheehan
- Producer: Patricia Rickey
- Camera setup: Multi-camera
- Running time: 30 minutes
- Production companies: Lazy B/F.O.B. Productions; Mea Culpa Productions; 20th Century Fox Television

Original release
- Network: NBC
- Release: September 16, 1989 – September 1, 1990

Sister Kate is an American sitcom created by Frank Dungan, Jeff Stein, and Tony Sheehan, that aired on NBC from September 16, 1989, to July 30, 1990, during the 1989–1990 television season.

== Synopsis ==
The series stars Stephanie Beacham as Sister Kate, a nun who in the pilot episode is transferred to Chicago to run an orphanage, where she is put in charge of a septet of unwanted orphans whose scheming ways have already run off three priests. Storylines involved Sister Kate matching wits with the kids, and the kids' potential adoptions. Sister Kate premiered on Saturday, September 16, 1989, at 9:30 EST as a sneak preview. It then aired regularly on Sundays, initially at 8:00 EST, then at 8:30. A few final episodes were aired during July 1990 at 8:00 EST on Monday nights. The low-rated series was canceled after 19 episodes.

== Cast ==
- Stephanie Beacham as Sister Katherine "Kate" Lambert
- Jason Priestley as Todd Mahaffey
- Erin Reed as April Newberry
- Hannah Cutrona as Frederika "Freddy" Marasco
- Penina Segall as Hilary Logan
- Harley Cross as Eugene Colodner
- Alexaundria Simmons as Violet Johnson
- Joel Robinson as Neville Williams

== Guest appearances ==
Rob Pilatus and Fabrice Morvan appeared as Milli Vanilli in the January 7, 1990, episode "Eugene's Feat", speaking a few lines in their natural voices before (what was later revealed to be) lip-synching their hit "Blame It on the Rain".

== Theme song ==
The series theme song, "Maybe An Angel", was written by Brian Rawlings and Mason Cooper and performed by Contemporary Christian Music pop star Amy Grant.

== Episodes ==
No.	Title	Directed by	Written by	Original release date
1	"Pilot"	Noam Pitlik	Frank Dungan, Jeff Stein & Tony Sheehan	September 16, 1989
2	"Freddy's Bad Habit"	Jeff Melman	Frank Dungan & Jeff Stein	September 21, 1989
Sister Kate goes to extraordinary measures to break Freddy's smoking habit; Neville gets upset when someone wants to adopt Violet.
3	"Eugene's Secret"	Jeff Melman	Frank Dungan, Jeff Stein & Tony Sheehan	September 24, 1989
Sister Kate announces that everyone will be moving into shared bedrooms in an attempt to save money on heating costs. As a result, Eugene is fearful that a long-kept secret will get out while new roommates Freddy and April constantly quarrel with each other.
4	"Freddy's Date"	Jeff Melman	William C. Kenny & Brenda Hampton	October 1, 1989
Freddy has a crush on the rich kid in her auto-shop class; Neville can't decide which musical instrument to play for his music class.
5	"Eugene's Model"	Jeff Melman	Tony Sheehan	October 15, 1989
Violet becomes jealous of the amount of time Neville spends with Sister Kate; Eugene takes up drawing and searches for a nude female model.
6	"Neville's Hired Hand"	Jeff Melman	Frank Dungan & Jeff Stein	October 22, 1989
Neville is so taken with a vagrant who stops for food that Kate hires him to be both a cook and handyman, on the condition that he continues to stay off the booze that he claimed to stop drinking.
7	"Hilary's Date"	Phill Lewis	Chuck Lorre	October 29, 1989
Hilary is somehow able to keep her wheelchair a secret from a boy she likes; Neville gives Kate the silent treatment after she scolds him for his language.
8	"Violet's Friend"	Jeff Melman	Brenda Hampton & William C. Kenny	November 5, 1989
Violet's friend visits and puts the gang in an uproar and she gets upset and runs away. Later, Sister Kate gets a phone call from a local hospital informing her that Violet is there.
9	"Kate's Baby"	Jeff Melman	Frank Dungan & Jeff Stein	November 19, 1989
10	"Kate's Furnace"	Jeff Melman	Unknown	November 26, 1989
11	"The Nun"	John Sgueglia	Tony Sheehan	December 3, 1989
12	"April in Paris"	Jeff Melman	Frank Dungan & Jeff Stein	December 10, 1989
13	"Father Christmas"	John Sgueglia	William C. Kenny & Brenda Hampton-Cain	December 17, 1989
14	"Eugene's Feat"	Phil Ramuno	Frank Dungan & Jeff Stein	January 7, 1990
15	"Kandid Kate"	John Sgueglia	Unknown	January 21, 1990
16	"Sweet Sixteen"	Unknown	Unknown	July 16, 1990
17	"Bingo"	Michael Zinberg	Brenda Hampton-Cain & William C. Kenny	July 23, 1990
18	"Todd's Cheap Date"	Jeff Melman	Frank Dungan & Jeff Stein	July 30, 1990
19	"Underwood Underfoot"	Unknown	Unknown	September 1, 1990

== Award nominations ==
Year	Award	Result	Category	Recipient
1990	Golden Globe Award	Nominated	Best Performance by an Actress in a TV-Series - Comedy/Musical	Stephanie Beacham
1990	Young Artist Awards	Nominated	Best New Television Series	–
1990	Young Artist Awards	Nominated	Best Young Actor Supporting Role in a Television Series	Harley Cross
1990	Young Artist Awards	Nominated	Best Young Actor Supporting Role in a Television Series	Jason Priestley
