= The Crazy World of Julius Vrooder =

1970 film by Arthur Hiller

- Theatrical release poster
- Directed by: Arthur Hiller
- Written by: Daryl Henry
- Produced by: Hugh Hefner; Edward L. Rissien; Arthur Hiller
- Starring: Timothy Bottoms; Barbara Hershey
- Cinematography: David M. Walsh
- Edited by: Robert C. Jones
- Music by: Bob Alcivar
- Production company: Playboy Enterprises
- Distributed by: 20th Century Fox
- Release date: October 18, 1974 (U.S.)
- Running time: 98 minutes
- Country: United States
- Language: English
- Budget: $1.7 million

The Crazy World of Julius Vrooder is a 1974 film from Playboy Enterprises directed by Arthur Hiller and produced by Hugh Hefner. This was the final feature film role for actor George Marshall, who is mostly known as a director (Destry Rides Again, Boy, Did I Get A Wrong Number!, You Can't Cheat an Honest Man).

== Plot ==
A Vietnam veteran who pretends to be insane ends up being admitted to the V.A. Hospital. He escapes and builds an underground bunker, which he equips with utilities such as electricity, and also falls in love with his nurse, Zanni.

== Main cast ==
Actor	Role
Timothy Bottoms	Vrooder
Barbara Hershey (as Barbara Seagull)	Zanni
George Marshall	Corky
Lawrence Pressman	Passki
Albert Salmi	Splint
Michael Cristofer	Alessini

== See also ==
- List of American films of 1974
