= The Man Who Was Never Born =

- The Outer Limits episode
- Episode no.: Season 1 Episode 6
- Directed by: Leonard Horn
- Written by: Anthony Lawrence
- Cinematography by: Conrad Hall
- Production code: 12
- Original air date: October 28, 1963

Guest appearances
- Martin Landau; Shirley Knight

Episode chronology
← Previous "The Sixth Finger"	Next → "O.B.I.T."

"The Man Who Was Never Born" (original title: "Cry of the Unborn") is an episode of the original The Outer Limits television show. It first broadcast on October 28, 1963, during the Halloween week of the first season. Its premise — preventing the birth of someone in the past to change the future — is echoed in the Terminator films. The episode has been described as a "perennial favorite among Outer Limits fans".

== Plot ==
After accidentally traveling through a time warp (a "time convulsion"), astronaut Joseph Reardon arrives on Earth in the year 2148. He finds a desolate world and an erudite but grotesquely mutated survivor named Andro. Andro explains that a biological disaster was caused by Bertram Cabot Jr., a "corrupt" 20th century scientist who isolated and developed an alien viral symbiont microbe that physically altered the entire human race and rendered it sterile. Andro laments that mankind has no hope of survival after the last of his generation die off.

But Reardon is determined to return to the past via the same time warp, with Andro along as a living warning of what the future holds. During their journey through the time warp, Reardon slowly fades away and vanishes, but manages to give Andro a revolver and tells Andro to kill Cabot if he must to save humanity.

Now on Earth in the year 1963, and with the ability to make himself appear undeformed, Andro searches for Cabot and meets Noelle Anderson, who lives in the boarding house where Andro has taken a room. It becomes clear that Andro has arrived too soon: Bertram Cabot Jr. has not yet been born, and Noelle will shortly marry Bertram Cabot Sr. In the guise of a normal human, Andro tries unsuccessfully to convince Cabot not to marry Noelle.

Andro begins to fall in love with Noelle. During the couple's wedding ceremony, Andro attempts to shoot Cabot but hesitates and is assaulted by Cabot and the wedding party. Andro's true grotesque appearance returns and he flees, pursued by Cabot and others. When Noelle catches up to Andro, he explains his mission to her. She confesses that she has fallen in love with him, and does not see his deformity. Noelle convinces Andro to take her with him to the future, thereby avoiding any possibility that she will have a child with Cabot.

They leave in Reardon's ship. However, the flow of time has been altered by Andro and Noelle's actions: because Bertram Cabot Jr. was never born, the symbiont was never created, and Andro was never born. Andro vanishes just as the spaceship arrives in 2148 A.D., leaving Noelle, weeping, to face the future alone. The final scene, which has been described as being the "most famous" of the series, breaks the fourth wall by showing Noelle in her spaceship seat next to a similar empty seat, on a dimly illuminated stage instead of in the confines of a spaceship.

It is interesting to note that the "true monster", Bertram Cabot Jr., is never seen in the episode. The episode has been described as Science Fiction / Horror, and the "first sheer fantasy" episode of the series, owing to lapses in logic in the story.

== Cast ==
- Martin Landau – Professor Andro
- Shirley Knight – Noelle Anderson
- Karl Held – Captain Joseph Reardon
- John Considine – Bertram Cabot
- Maxine Stuart – Mrs. McCluskey
- Marlowe Jensen – Minister

== Production ==
The story's writer, Anthony Lawrence, said in an interview that the story was inspired by "...one of my old favorites, Jean Cocteau's Beauty and the Beast, the French version, which was a beautiful film. I was thinking of that film, and also just the idea that had always kind of fascinated me. Joseph Stefano loved the idea, and it had [in it], as I remember, a lot of what I was feeling at the time. I always liked romantic stories, and this was a chance to do something that you really don't get to do very often in television. I gravitated toward that." Lawrence's first draft was submitted in August 1963 as "Cry of the Unborn".

Direction of the episode was done by Leonard Horn, the episode was scored by Dominic Frontiere, and Conrad Hall handled the cinematography. The first assistant director for the episode was Lee Katzin.

== See also ==
- La Jetée, 1962 French short film in which a man travels back in time from a devastated post-nuclear future as part of a project to rebuild.
- 12 Monkeys, 1995 American film based on La jetée in which the protagonist must find in the past the source of a bacteriological infection that has devastated his future earth.
- "Patient Zero", episode of the 1990s Outer Limits revival series in which a future soldier travels back in time to prevent the formation of a deadly virus
