= Frank Dungan =

American television producer and writer

Frank "The Tank" Dungan is an American television producer and writer who won a 1982 Primetime Emmy for the television show Barney Miller. He is a graduate of Bowling Green State University. He is a native of Philadelphia, Pennsylvania. Other movies and TV series include Mr. Mom (1983), Mr. Belvedere (1985-1989) and Sister Kate (1989-1990).
