= O.B.I.T. =

- The Outer Limits episode
- Episode no.: Season 1 Episode 7
- Directed by: Gerd Oswald
- Written by: Meyer Dolinsky
- Cinematography by: Conrad Hall
- Production code: 14
- Original air date: November 4, 1963

Guest appearances
- Peter Breck; Jeff Corey; Joanne Gilbert; Alan Baxter; Harry Townes

Episode chronology
← Previous "The Man Who Was Never Born"	Next → "The Human Factor"

"O.B.I.T." is an episode of the original The Outer Limits television show. It first aired on November 4, 1963, during the first season.

== Introduction ==
A new device, the O.B.I.T. machine, allows the observation of anyone, anywhere, at any time.

== Opening narration ==
In this room, twenty four hours a day, seven days a week, security personnel at the Defense Department's Cypress Hills Research Center keep constant watch on its scientists through O.B.I.T., a mysterious electronic device whose very existence was carefully kept from the public at large. And so it would have remained but for the facts you are about to witness…

== Plot ==
While inquiring into the murder of an administrator at a government research facility, a U.S. senator is confronted with paranoia, secrecy, and intimidation. He ultimately learns the cause: An unusual security device that is used to monitor its employees. The spying on people leads to: murder, bad morale, false accusations, interrogations, fear, distrust, a breakdown in social activities, a big increase in divorce and alcoholism, suicide, decreased communication and misunderstandings, intimidation, coercion, threats, a breakdown in morality, escapism or exile, conspiracies. It spreads out of control; it is hideous; it saps the spirit; it's addictive like a drug; it breeds contempt; it causes fights; it drives people apart; it leads to lying; and it was brought in by an enemy of the US. The Outer Band Individuated Teletracer (known by the acronym O.B.I.T.) is so pervasive and invasive that no one can escape its prying eye, at any time within 500 miles (800 km). It is even deemed addictive by some of its operators. After a missing administrator is found and reveals his knowledge of O.B.I.T., its sinister, unearthly origins and purpose become apparent; the device is, in actuality, an alien invention that was designed to demoralize and desensitize the human race in preparation for invasion. During government hearings, Lomax, one of the project's administrators, reveals himself to be an enemy alien, proudly warning onlookers as to the horrific impact O.B.I.T. will have on mankind. As he speaks, a nearby O.B.I.T. machine shows Lomax in his true one-eyed alien form. Before he can be apprehended by a guard, he proceeds to activate a shield, reveal his true Helosian form and disappear, leaving the government to deal with the problem of destroying O.B.I.T.

== Closing narration ==
Agents of the Justice Department are rounding up the machines now. But these machines, these inventions of another planet, have been cunningly conceived to prey on our most mortal weakness. In the last analysis, dear friends, whether O.B.I.T. lives up to its name or not will depend on you.

== Cast ==
- Peter Breck – as Senator Orville
- Jeff Corey – as Byron Lomax / creature
- Harry Townes – as Dr. Clifford Scott
- Joanne Gilbert – as Barbara Scott
- Alan Baxter – as Col. Grover
- Sammy Reese – as Clyde Wyatt
- Jason Wingreen – as Fred Severn
- C. Lindsay Workman – as Dr. Anderson
- Konstantin Shayne – as Phil Fletcher
- Robert Beneveds – as James Harrison
- Chuck Hamilton – as Armand Younger (uncredited)
- William Douglas – as The Creature (uncredited)
