= The High Cost of Loving =

1958 film by José Ferrer

- film poster
- Directed by: Jose Ferrer
- Written by: Alford Van Ronkel; Milo O. Frank Jr.
- Produced by: Milo O. Frank Jr.
- Starring: Jose Ferrer; Gena Rowlands
- Cinematography: George J. Folsey
- Edited by: Ferris Webster
- Music by: Jeff Alexander
- Distributed by: Metro-Goldwyn-Mayer
- Release date: May 16, 1958
- Running time: 87 minutes
- Country: United States
- Language: English
- Budget: $614,000
- Box office: $580,000

The High Cost of Loving is a 1958 comedy film directed by and starring Jose Ferrer. It marked the film debut of Gena Rowlands.

== Plot ==
Around the same time that Jim Fry learns that his place of work is merging with another company, his wife of nine years Ginny reveals she might be pregnant with their first child.

Jim celebrates with friend Steve Hayward, but when invitations are extended to a company luncheon to meet the new executives, Jim is excluded. The word goes around quickly that new president Eli Cave is planning a few changes. Jim feels upset and betrayed after 15 years of loyalty to the firm.

Ginny is pleased about the baby, but after Steve's wife, her friend Syd, speaks happily of the upcoming luncheon and improved prospects for their husbands, Jim confesses to Ginny that he's actually about to be fired. The angrier he gets, Jim decides to write a letter of protest, then confront Cave face-to-face, particularly after seeing his name being removed from his office door.

Jim is unaware that Cave is planning a promotion for him and has been informed of the invitation slight, an oversight. He is eager to invite Jim to the luncheon personally, which results in Jim's needing to humbly request his angry letter be returned. When all is resolved, he and Ginny toast his new success and their future parenthood.

== Cast ==
- José Ferrer as Jim Fry
- Gena Rowlands as Ginny Fry
- Joanne Gilbert as Syd Heyward
- Jim Backus as Paul Mason
- Bobby Troup as Steve Heyward
- Edward Platt as Eli Cave
- Philip Ober as Herb Zorn
- Werner Klemperer as Joseph Jessup
- Nancy Kulp as Miss Matthews, Cave's Secretary (uncredited)
- Hal Smith as Woods, co-worker of Jim's (uncredited)
- Richard Deacon as Obstetrician (uncredited)

== Production ==
The film was originally called Bay the Moon (from the Shakespeare quote, "I'd rather be a dog and bay the moon than such a Roman"). It was based on an original story by Milo Frank and Rip Van Ronkel. They developed it for use on Playhouse 90 where Frank worked, but decided not to make it when they could not get the star they wanted, Jackie Gleason. In 1957 Frank signed a contract with MGM to produce and write films. He took Bay the Moon with him.

Jose Ferrer agreed to write and direct. It was the feature film debut of Gena Rowlands, who had been a Broadway success in Middle of the Night. She signed a contract with MGM to make two films a year over five years. Rowlands was cast in the film in August 1957.

"It's a comedy and I think it's going to be quite funny," said Rowlands. "It's an old fashioned man-woman style comedy."

== Reception ==
According to MGM records, the movie earned $305,000 in the US and Canada and $275,000 elsewhere, making a loss to the studio of $350,000.

== See also ==
- List of American films of 1958
