= Fish (American TV series) =

- Genre: Sitcom
- Created by: Danny Arnold
- Based on: Phil Fish by Danny Arnold and Theodore J. Flicker
- Developed by: Danny Arnold; Tony Sheehan; Chris Hayward
- Starring: Abe Vigoda; Florence Stanley; Barry Gordon; Lenny Bari; Todd Bridges
- Theme music composer: Jack Elliot; Allyn Ferguson
- Country of origin: United States
- Original language: English
- No. of seasons: 2
- No. of episodes: 35 (list of episodes)

Production
- Executive producer: Danny Arnold
- Running time: 30 minutes
- Production company: The Mimus Corporation

Original release
- Network: ABC
- Release: February 5, 1977 – May 18, 1978

Related
- Barney Miller

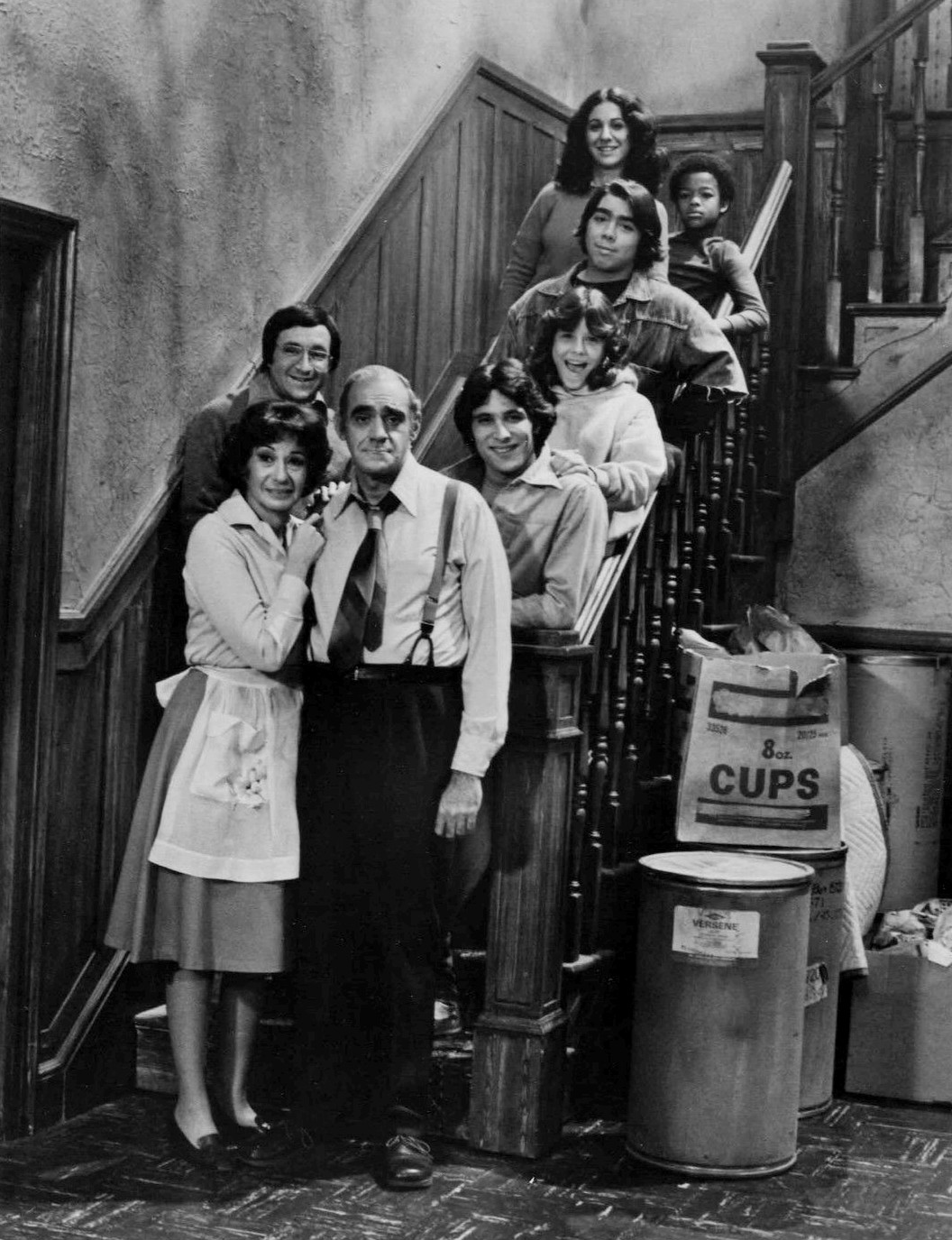
Cast of TV's Fish (1977), from top: Sarah Natoli, Todd Bridges, John Cassisi, Denise Miller, Lenny Bari, Barry Gordon, Florence Stanley, Abe Vigoda

Fish is an American sitcom and a spin-off of Barney Miller that aired on ABC from February 5, 1977 to May 18, 1978. The series starred Abe Vigoda as New York City Police Department Detective Phil Fish and Florence Stanley as his wife Bernice.

== Overview ==
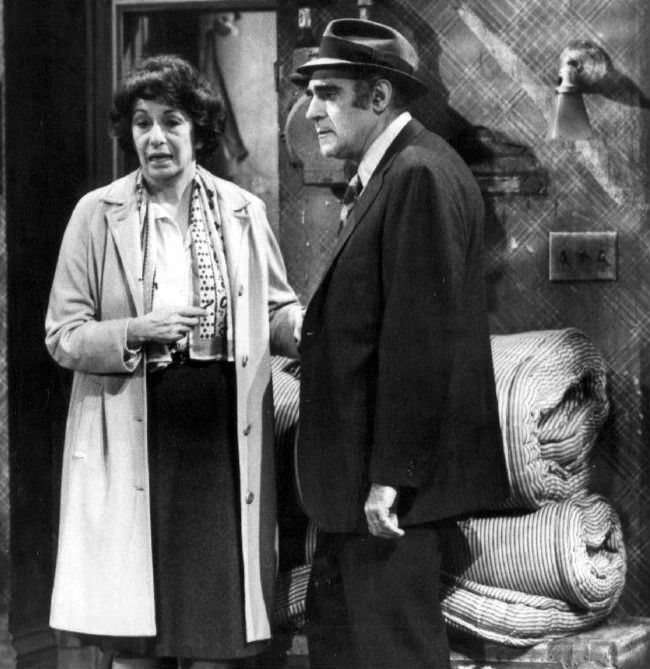
Phil and Bernice

The series focused on the domestic side of Fish's life: he and Bernice became foster parents to a racially mixed group of five children known as "Persons in Need of Supervision" or PINS. The kids were played by Todd Bridges, Denise Miller, Len Bari, John Cassisi, and Sarah Natoli. Barry Gordon played Charlie, a graduate student majoring in child psychology, assisting Fish and Bernice in supervising the kids. Miller and Cassisi both had appeared previously as the same characters on season three of Barney Miller, usually getting in trouble with the law and Fish having to supervise them. Bridges had appeared as a different character during the first season of Barney Miller.

During the show's first season, frequent references were made to Fish's job as a detective and his colleagues at the 12th Precinct. Two characters from Barney Miller made crossover appearances on Fish: Steve Landesberg as Det. Arthur Dietrich in episode 8, and (in a brief, uncredited and wordless cameo in episode 10) Hal Linden as Capt. Barney Miller.

Vigoda's character of Phil Fish continued to appear sporadically in the second half of Season 3 of Barney Miller while also leading the cast of Fish. Detective Fish retired from the NYPD in Season 4, Episode 2 of Barney Miller.

== Cast ==
- Abe Vigoda as Philip K. Fish
- Florence Stanley as Bernice Fish, Philip's wife
- Barry Gordon as Charlie Harrison
- John Cassisi as Victor Kruetzer, Philip & Bernice's second foster son
- Denise Miller as Jilly Papalardo, Philip & Bernice's second foster daughter
- Lenny Bari as Mike Ferroni, Philip & Bernice's first foster son
- Todd Bridges as Loomis, Philip & Bernice's third foster son
- Sarah Natoli as Diane Polanski, Philip & Bernice's first foster daughter

== Development and production ==
Creator Danny Arnold was originally against the idea of giving the character of Fish his own spin-off, believing that Fish was a character that was better suited to the precinct. Originally, Arnold agreed to the spin-off on the condition that Vigoda continued to play his Fish character on the show in half of the episodes of the third season, as well as future seasons. However, Vigoda insisted on quitting Barney Miller and staying on just Fish, wanting to be the star of his own series. "I found myself with a very unhappy actor on my hands. Abe would walk around the set like a man in shock. Who was I to deprive an actor of this once-in-a-lifetime break? Finally I said, 'Okay, just stay through the third year of Barney Miller, and we'll go with your show, too," recalled Arnold.

ABC was publicly contemplating a Fish spin-off as early as October 1975. The initial premise was to show Fish's home life with "his wife, his daughter, and his daughter's suitor" with only occasional visits to the 12th Precinct. The intention was to have a pilot air as an episode of Barney Miller in early 1976 with a series debut that fall. The second-season episode of Barney Miller, "Fish", effectively was the pilot for that concept, with much of the episode taking place in Fish's home and featuring Fish's wife and daughter, along with the daughter's romantic drama.

Fish was directed by Jeremiah Morris and aired from February 1977 through June 1978 on ABC. According to Bridges, just 12 during the show's second season, Fish was cancelled after Vigoda demanded more money for a third season than the producers were willing to pay.

The series had no episode written as a finale. However, during a guest appearance on Barney Miller nearly three years after the cancellation of Fish, the Fish character stated that money for the group home had been cut off, resulting in the city taking back the kids. Fish also stated, resignedly, that Cassisi's character (Victor) had gotten arrested for assault and battery and Miller's character (Jilly) had gotten pregnant and married the baby's father.

== Home media ==
Shout! Factory released the entire Barney Miller series in a 25-disc DVD set on October 25, 2011. A bonus feature of the set is the complete first season of Fish, making it the first time that Fish has ever seen a DVD release.

DVD name	Ep #	Release date
Barney Miller: The Complete Series (First season of Fish included as a special feature)	170	October 25, 2011
