= Jennie (musical) =

- Original Cast Recording
- Music: Arthur Schwartz
- Lyrics: Howard Dietz
- Book: Arnold Schulman
- Basis: The life of Laurette Taylor
- Productions: 1963 Broadway

Jennie is a musical with a book by Arnold Schulman, music by Arthur Schwartz, and lyrics by Howard Dietz, and starred Mary Martin.

The plot focuses on actors and married couple Jennie Malone and James O'Connor, who tour the country in popular melodramas. Much of the action consists of elaborate spoofs of the type of entertainment offered to audiences in the early 20th century.

== Background ==
In the late 1950s, the project began as an account of actress Laurette Taylor's early life and career, based on a biography written by her daughter Marguerite Courtney. While it was still in its early stages, a non-musical adaptation of the book starring Judy Holliday closed after a week in New Haven. Undaunted, the creative team forged ahead, tailoring what was then called Blood and Thunder specifically for the talents of Mary Martin who, with her husband Richard Halliday, agreed to produce the show with Cheryl Crawford. Martin and Halliday financed half of the $500,000 production costs and Crawford and Alan Pakula the other half.

S. N. Behrman used Taylor's son Dwight's biography as a source for the musical's book, which centered on Taylor's husband Charles and the various women in his life, all portrayed by Martin. His book ultimately was abandoned, and Schulman was called in to write a new version, which fictionalized the story and its characters. The end result bore no resemblance to either the original concept or Taylor.

== Productions ==
Out-of-town tryouts

Jennie was plagued with problems from the start. In Boston, the major character of Jennie's second husband (J. Hartley Manners, who was to be played by Robin Bailey) was eliminated, and Carol Haney replaced Matt Mattox as choreographer. Schwartz sued The Boston Globe and its critic Kevin Kelly, on the basis that his review implied the composer had "stolen or plagiarized" from other composers. In summarizing the Boston reviews, The New York Times noted that while the critics unanimously praised Martin, they were "disappointed" in the show. It was "too long, too cultured, and sometimes even too solemn for its own good", according to Elliot Norton of The Record American.

In Detroit, the leading man was replaced (George Wallace replaced Dennis O'Keefe), and animosity developed between Schwartz and Dietz and the Hallidays, who decided not to bring the show to New York City. When the composers threatened to sue the couple for the $1.35 million advance sale, they agreed to open as scheduled.

Broadway

The musical opened on Broadway at the Majestic Theatre on October 17, 1963 and closed on December 28, 1963, after 82 performances and four previews. Directed by Vincent J. Donehue, choreographed by Matt Mattox (official IBDB credits) and with costumes by Irene Sharaff, the cast included George D. Wallace as O'Connor, Robin Bailey as Cromwell, Jack De Lon as Abe O'Shaughnessy, Jeremiah Morris as The Bear, Sydney Harris, and Indian Fakir, and Ethel Shutta as Nellie Malone.

The critics were delighted by the score and Martin's slapstick antics but found little else to praise. Howard Taubman, in The New York Times wrote: "Not that Miss Martin has lost her luster...she continues to be a game and resourceful trouper, willing to do an impossible backbend while being carried aloft and game enough to let herself be whirled head over heels on a torture rack and come up smiling and belting out a top note." Walter Kerr reviewing in the Herald Tribune wrote: "a woeful tale of some woeful people told in a woeful way." This was Martin's first Broadway flop. (She had starred in Nice Goin and Dancing in the Streets which closed out-of-town. Dancing was written by Vernon Duke and Howard Dietz, and closed in Boston in 1943.)

The New York Times reported the show’s losses as $450,000.

== Synopsis ==
In 1906 Jennie Malone and James O'Connor tour the United States in popular melodramas; they are both an acting team and married couple. In a small town in South Dakota, Jennie is appearing in the play "The Mountie Gets His Man, or Chang Lu, King of the White Slaver", and must perch on a tree limb, which lowers her over a fake waterfall. In another play, Jennie plays Shalimar in "The Sultan's Last Bride" with bells on her fingers. Jennie and James, with cane and straw hat, do a soft-shoe dance in another show.

When Jennie leaves her husband the English playwright Christopher Lawrence Cromwell offers her work.

== Song list ==
Act I

- Waitin' for the Evening Train - Jennie Malone and James O'Conner
- When You're Far Away from New York Town - Abe O'Shaughnessy and Company
- I Still Look at You That Way - Jennie Malone
- When You're Far Away from New York Town (Reprise)
- For Better or Worse - Nellie Malone
- Born Again - James O'Conner, Abe O'Shaughnessy and Company
- Over Here - Christopher Lawrence Cromwell and Jennie Malone
- Before I Kiss the World Good-Bye - Jennie Malone
- Sauce Diable - Dancing Ensemble
- Where You Are - Christopher Lawrence Cromwell and Jennie Malone
- The Jig - Christopher Lawrence Cromwell, Jennie Malone and Company
- See Seattle - James O'Conner

Act II

- High Is Better Than Low - James O'Conner, Jennie Malone and Company
- The Night May Be Dark - Jennie Malone and Nellie Malone
- Dance Rehearsal - Harem Girls
- I Believe in Takin' a Chance - James O'Conner and Abe O'Shaughnessy
- Welcome - Harem Girls
- Lonely Nights - Jennie Malone
- Before I Kiss the World Good-Bye (Reprise) - Jennie Malone

== Recording ==
An original cast recording was released by RCA Victor (ASIN: B000003F4Z) in October 1963. RCA Victor recording artist Ed Ames released a single of "Before I Kiss the World Goodbye" during this time as well.
