= Edward L. Rissien =

American producer (1924–2023)

- Born: October 20, 1924; Des Moines, Iowa, U.S.
- Died: April 8, 2023 (aged 98); Los Angeles, California, U.S.
- Occupation(s): Production company executive Producer

Edward Louis Rissien (October 20, 1924 – April 8, 2023) was an American production company executive and producer.

== Biography ==
Rissien was born in Des Moines, Iowa on October 20, 1924. His parents were Russian Ukrainian immigrants who had settled there. In the 1940s, he attended Grinnell College in Iowa and then served in the Army Air Force. After the war he went to Stanford graduating in 1949 in Political Science. Rissien's interest in theater was influenced by his sister Dorothy, whose son Michael Zinberg is now a well-known television director, and by Cloris Leachman, a high school classmate of his at Roosevelt High School in Des Moines. When the war was over and Rissien returned to Des Moines, he quickly realized he wanted to be closer to theater and in a telephone conversation with Cloris, she suggested that he come to New York. At the time, she had just signed a contract with Rodgers and Hammerstein. Shortly thereafter, he left for New York.

== Career ==
Rissien began his career in entertainment in Summer Stock in New York and Winter Stock in Palm Beach Florida. He was an assistant stage manager on Broadway on South Pacific and stage manager on Midsummer which introduced to Broadway the actress Geraldine Page.

Rissien moved to Hollywood in 1954 to work on the Mark Stevens series Big Town followed by production assignments at Screen Gems at Columbia Pictures. In 1959 he established Harry Belafonte's film production company, HarBel Productions, where he acquired the film rights to Odds Against Tomorrow. From there he went to ABC, where he was program supervisor on shows such as Combat and The Donna Reed Show. In the early 1960s, he was hired as VP of production for Bing Crosby Productions, producer of such shows as Hogan's Heroes, Ben Casey, The Bing Crosby Show and others. After that he went to Filmways as VP of Production for film and television. Projects produced during this time included The Beverly Hillbillies and Green Acres and the film Castle Keep directed by legendary director Sydney Pollack.

Rissien produced independent films, including Snow Job for Warner Bros. before joining Playboy Productions in 1972 as an executive VP of production. While at Playboy, he produced two feature films, Saint Jack, directed by Peter Bogdanovich and The Crazy World of Julius Vrooder directed by Arthur Hiller. He remained at Playboy Productions for 16 years, eventually becoming president overseeing television movies, specials and pilots.

== Death ==
Rissien died at his home in Los Angeles on April 8, 2023, at the age of 98.

=== Career affiliations ===
- Motion Picture Academy
- Television Academy
- Producers Guild
