= Phil Fish (character) =

- Barney Miller, Fish character
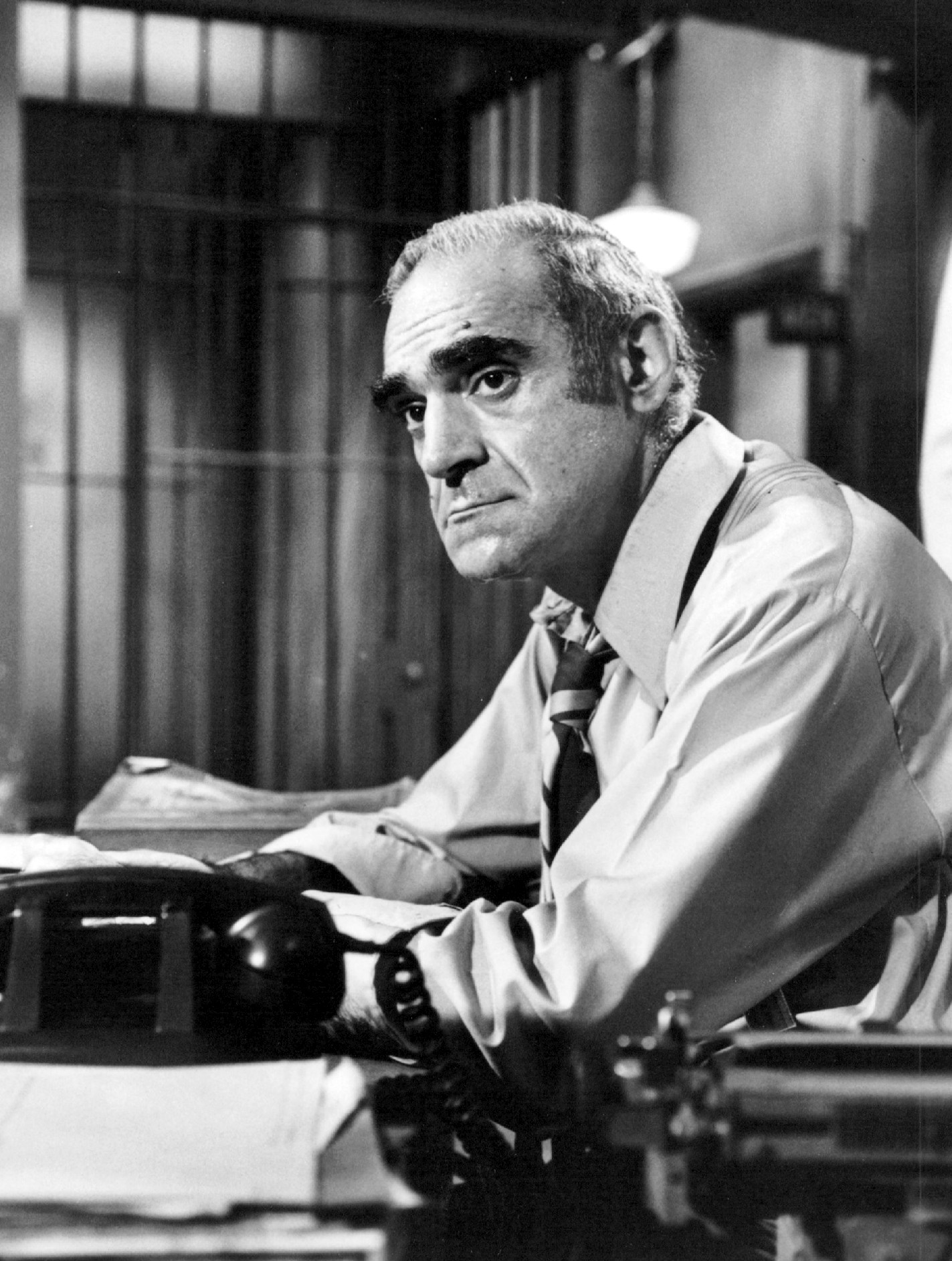
- First appearance: "The Life and Times of Captain Barney Miller" (1974 pilot)
- Last appearance: "Lady and the Bomb" (1981)
- Portrayed by: Abe Vigoda

In-universe information
- Title: Sergeant
- Occupation: Police detective
- Affiliation: NYPD
- Spouse: Bernice
- Children: Mike (foster son); Diane (foster daughter); Victor (foster son); Jilly (foster daughter); Loomis (foster son)
- Nationality: American

Detective Philip K. "Phil" Fish is a fictional NYPD detective in the TV series Barney Miller and later in the spin off series Fish. He was played by Abe Vigoda. He was a series regular for the first three seasons and, after that, a recurring character, appearing in 63 out of 171 episodes of the show.

Fish was an unusual character for a television detective: aged, grumpy, and suffering from a variety of maladies for which he constantly needs medication. His most recurring malady was inflamed hemorrhoids, for which he would bring a donut cushion to his desk chair.

Fish's wife was Bernice, played by Florence Stanley, who appeared in six episodes. She would make occasional visits to the squad room. On one occasion, Fish forgot her name during breakfast.

In-universe, he retired at the age of 63 with 38 years of service from the 12th Precinct. The character of Fish became the center of his own series, Fish, in which he and his wife served as foster parents for a number of troubled children, referred to euphemistically as PINS, or "persons in need of supervision".

His successor at the precinct was Det. Arthur P. Dietrich. Fish visited the 12th Precinct twice after his retirement from the force, once shortly afterward in fourth season and again in the 18th episode of the seventh season: "Lady and the Bomb". In that episode, three years after his previous appearance, he revealed that the PINS program had been shut down by the government due to funding cuts (although it was implied he was still in touch with the foster children and attempting to do what he could for them.) This is his last appearance in the Barney Miller universe.
