= Abe Vigoda =

American actor (1921–2016)

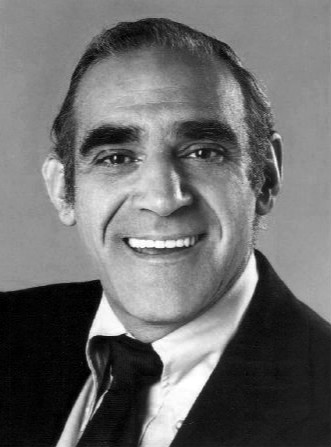
- Vigoda in 1975
- Born: Abraham Vigoda; February 24, 1921; New York City, U.S.
- Died: January 26, 2016 (aged 94); Woodland Park, New Jersey, U.S.
- Resting place: Beth David Cemetery, Elmont, New York, U.S.
- Occupation: Actor
- Years active: 1947–2016
- Spouses: Sonja Gohlke (m. 1939; div. 1963); Beatrice Schy (m. 1968; died 1992)
- Children: 1

Abraham Vigoda (February 24, 1921 – January 26, 2016) was an American actor, known for his portrayals of Salvatore Tessio in The Godfather (1972) and Phil Fish in both Barney Miller (1975–1977, 1982) and Fish (1977–1978). His career as an actor began in 1947 performing with the American Theatre Wing and continued in Broadway productions throughout the 1960s and 1970s.

== Early life and education ==
Vigoda was born and raised in Brownsville, Brooklyn, New York, on February 24, 1921, the son of Samuel Vigoda (Yiddish: שמואל וויגאָדאַ; Russian: Самуэль Вигода) and Lena Moses (Yiddish: לענאַ משה וויגאָדאַ; Russian: Лена Мозес Вигода), Jewish immigrants from Russia.

After leaving school, Vigoda worked as a printer before enlisting in the U.S. Army in 1943, serving in World War II. After his military service, he studied acting on the G.I. Bill at the American Theatre Wing. In the late 1940s, he began working in radio, and made his television debut in an installment of the live drama series Studio One.

== Career ==
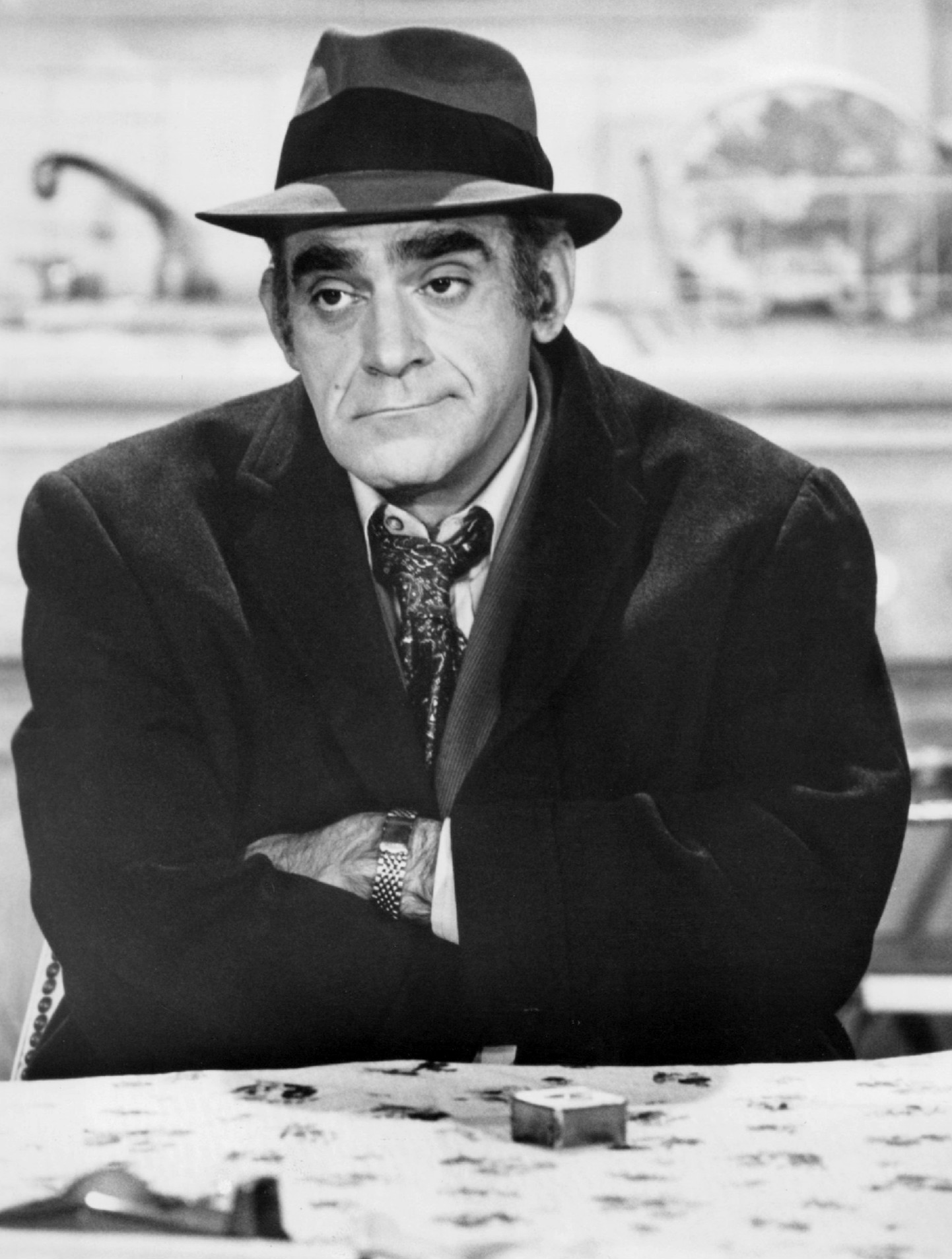
Vigoda as Phil Fish in Fish (1977)

Vigoda began acting while in his 20s, working with the American Theatre Wing. His career as a professional actor began in 1947.

He gained acting notoriety in the late 1960s and early 1970s with his work in Broadway productions, including Marat/Sade (1967), portraying Mad Animal; The Man in the Glass Booth (1968), portraying Landau; Inquest (1970); and Tough to Get Help (1972), portraying Abraham Lincoln.

His best-known film role is that of Salvatore Tessio in The Godfather (1972). He also appeared briefly in The Godfather Part II, in a flashback sequence at the end of the film. According to Francis Ford Coppola's commentary on the DVD's widescreen edition, Vigoda landed the role of Tessio in an "open call", in which actors who did not have agents could come for an audition.

He gained further fame as Phil Fish on Barney Miller, a character known for his world-weary demeanor and persistent hemorrhoids. Vigoda landed the role after an unusual audition, in which he unwittingly displayed that he was a perfect fit for the role:

While living in Los Angeles, I'd jog three to five miles a day. One morning jogging, my agent calls about a new series called Barney Miller, saying, "Go there at once."
Well, I was tired and exhausted ... I must have run five miles that morning. I said. "I have to go home and take a shower."
"No, no, no. Go right now to Studio City, you're very right for it, they know you from The Godfather, they want to see you."
"With my shorts?"
"Go."
Danny Arnold and Ted Flicker, the producers, look at me, I look at them, they look at me again. "You look tired."
"Of course I'm tired, I jogged five miles this morning, I'm exhausted."
"Yeah, yeah, tell me, you look like you have hemorrhoids."
"What are you, a doctor or a producer?"

— Abe Vigoda, quoted in Louis Zorich's What Have You Done?: The Inside Stories of Auditioning—from the Ridiculous to the Sublime (2009)

Vigoda's character on Barney Miller was popular, and a spin-off television series, Fish, was created for him in 1977. The series, a situation comedy, ran from February 5, 1977, to May 18, 1978.

== Mistaken reports of death ==
Prior to his actual death in January 2016, Vigoda was a repeated victim of mistaken death announcements. These led to jokes, often with Vigoda as a participant.

In 1982, People magazine mistakenly referred to Vigoda as dead. At the time, Vigoda, aged 60, was performing in a stage play in Calgary. He took the mistake with good humor, posing for a photograph published in Variety, in which he is sitting up in a coffin, holding the erroneous issue of People. Jeff Jarvis, a People employee at the time, said that the magazine's editors were known for "messing up" stories, and one of them repeatedly inserted the phrase "the late" in reference to Vigoda, even after a researcher correctly removed it. The erroneous version was what went to print.

In 1987, the same mistake was made when a reporter for WWOR, Channel 9 serving the New York metropolitan area mistakenly referred to him as the "late Abe Vigoda". She realized and corrected her mistake the next day.

He had been the subject of many running gags pertaining to the mistaken reports of his death. In 1997, Vigoda appeared in Good Burger as the character Otis, the titular restaurant's French fry man. Several jokes were made about his high age, including his character Otis saying, "I should've died years ago". That same year, he was shopping at Bloomingdale's in Manhattan when the salesman remarked, "You look like Abe Vigoda. But you can't be Abe Vigoda because he's dead." A Late Night with David Letterman skit showed Letterman trying to summon Vigoda's ghost, but Vigoda walked in and declared, "I'm not dead yet, you pinhead!"

At a New York Friars Club roast of Rob Reiner that Vigoda attended, Billy Crystal joked, "I have nothing to say about Abe. I was always taught to speak well of the dead."

In May 2001, a website was created to report whether Vigoda was alive or dead; it eventually went offline no later than 2023. In addition, in 2005, a "tongue-in-cheek" Firefox extension was released, with the sole purpose of telling the browser's user of Vigoda's status.

Continuing the gag, he frequently appeared on Late Night with Conan O'Brien to make fun of his status, including a guest appearance on the show's final episode. Host Conan O’Brien later named a rock band he formed The Vigodas in Abe’s honor.

At the 1998 New York Friars Club roast of Drew Carey, with Vigoda in the audience, Jeff Ross joked, "My one regret is that Abe Vigoda isn't alive to see this." He followed that with, "Drew, you go to Vegas; what's the over–under on Abe Vigoda?" On January 23, 2009, Vigoda appeared on The Today Show, after host Matt Lauer commented that Vigoda was dead. He said he was doing well, joked about previous reports of his death, and announced that he had just completed a voice-over for an H&R Block commercial to air during the Super Bowl.

Vigoda and Betty White, both 88 years old, appeared in "Game", a Snickers commercial that debuted during Super Bowl XLIV on February 7, 2010. The synopsis made fun of the advanced age of the actors. The Super Bowl Ad Meter poll respondents rated the ad the highest of any shown during the game.

On October 31, 2013, at age 92, Vigoda again defied rumors of his demise by appearing on stage with the American rock band Phish in Atlantic City, New Jersey, during a performance of the band's song "Wombat", from their 2014 album Fuego, which mentions Vigoda by name.

== Personal life ==
Vigoda and his first wife Sonja Gohlke had one daughter named Carol. Their marriage ended in divorce. His second marriage to Beatrice Schy lasted from 1968 until her death in 1992.

Vigoda enjoyed playing handball, and stated in an interview that he was "almost" a champion at the game in his youth.

== Death ==
On January 26, 2016, Vigoda died in his sleep at his daughter Carol Fuchs's home in Woodland Park, New Jersey, of natural causes. He was 94. He had gone there "to escape the hazards of a blizzard".

Vigoda's funeral was held on January 31, 2016. Notable figures including comic Gilbert Gottfried and former New York City mayor David Dinkins attended. He was buried in the Beth David Cemetery in Elmont, Nassau County, New York.

At the 2016 Academy Awards show, Vigoda was not included in the show's memorial reel, surprising many and prompting a small backlash.

== Filmography ==
=== Film ===
Year	Title	Role	Notes
1965	Three Rooms in Manhattan	Waiter	Uncredited
1972	The Godfather	Salvatore Tessio	
1973	The Devil's Daughter	Alikhine	
1973	The Don Is Dead	Don Talusso	
1974	The Story of Pretty Boy Floyd	Dominic Morrell	
1974	Newman's Law	John Dellanzia	
1974	The Godfather Part II	Salvatore Tessio	
1978	The Cheap Detective	Sgt. Rizzuto	
1979	Death Car on the Freeway	Mr. Frisch	
1981	The Big Stuffed Dog	Carnival Pitchman	
1984	Cannonball Run II	Caesar	
1985	The Stuff	Stuff Commercial Guest Star	Cameo
1986	Vasectomy: A Delicate Matter	Detective Abe Fossi	
1987	Plain Clothes	Mr. Wiseman	
1988	Grandmother's House	Grandpa	
1989	Look Who's Talking	Grandpa	
1989	Prancer	Orel Benton	
1990	Keaton's Cop	Louis Keaton	
1990	Joe Versus the Volcano	Waponis Chief	
1993	Fist of Honor	Victor Malucci	
1993	Sugar Hill	Gus Molino	
1993	Me and the Kid	Pawn Broker	
1993	Batman: Mask of the Phantasm	Sal Valestra (voice)	
1994	North	Alaskan Grandpa	
1994	Home of Angels	Grandpa	
1995	Jury Duty	Judge Powell	
1995	The Misery Brothers	Don Frito Layleone	
1996	Love Is All There Is	Rudy	
1996	Underworld	Will Cassady	
1997	Good Burger	Otis	
1997	Me and the Gods	Zeus	
1997	A Brooklyn State of Mind	Uncle Guy	
1998	Witness to the Mob	Paul Castellano	
1999	Just the Ticket	Arty	
2000	Chump Change	The Frog	
2003	Crime Spree	Angelo Giancarlo	
2006	Farce of the Penguins	Boca Penguin (voice)	
2007	The Unknown Trilogy	Uncle Morty	Segment: "Frankie the Squirrel"

=== Television ===
Year	Title	Role	Notes
1949	Studio One	Old Train Passenger	Episode: "Two Sharp Knives"
1969–1970	Dark Shadows	Ezra Braithwaite, Otis Greene	3 episodes
1973	Mannix	Anton Valine	Episode: "A Matter of Principle"
1973–1974	Toma	Donzer, Carl Bello	2 episodes
1974	The Rookies	Michael Lance	Episode: "Something Less Than a Man"
1974	Hawaii Five-O	Abe Kemper	Episode: "The Two-Faced Corpse"
1974	Kojak	Kilty	Episode: "The Best Judge Money Can Buy"
1974–1981	Barney Miller	Det. Phil Fish	Main role
1974, 1978	The Rockford Files	Phil Gabriel, Al Dancer	2 episodes
1975	Cannon	Mr. Couzellous	Episode: "Search and Destroy"
1976	The Bionic Woman	Barlow	Episode: "Black Magic"
1977–1978	Fish	Det. Phil Fish	Main role
1978	Vega$	Max	Episode: "Centerfold"
1979	$weepstake$	Anthony	Episode: "Lynn and Grover and Joey"
1979	Supertrain	Ray Yellburton	Episode: "A Very Formal Heist"
1979	Eight Is Enough	Ben Ryan	Episode: "The Final Days"
1979	B. J. and the Bear	Ben Rule	Episode: "Mary Ellen"
1980	The Littlest Hobo	Howard Mattson	Episode: "Million Dollar Fur Heist"
1984	Mike Hammer	Arthur	Episode: "A Bullet for Benny"
1986	Tales from the Darkside	Jake Corelli	Episode: "A Choice of Dreams"
1988	Superboy	Mr. Wagner	Episode: "Back to Oblivion"
1989	B.L. Stryker	Clayton Baskin	Episode: "The Dancer's Touch"
1990	MacGyver	Bill Cody	Episode: "Harry's Will"
1991	Murder, She Wrote	George	Episode: "The Prodigal Father"
1996	Law & Order	Detective Landis	Episode: "Remand"
1996	Weird Science	Old Man Lisa	Episode: "Grumpy Old Genie"
1996	Wings	Harry	Episode: "All About Christmas Eve"
1997	Touched by an Angel	Receptionist Angel	Episode: "Clipped Wings"
1998	Promised Land	Albert Spokaine	Episode: "Jury Duty"
1999	Mad About You	Kalman Wertzel	Episode: "Farmer Buchman"
1999	The Norm Show	Sal	Episode: "Norm, Crusading Social Worker"
2000	Manhattan, AZ	Ben	3 episodes
2001	Deadline	Joseph Spiaggio	Episode: "Don't I Know You?"
2001	Family Guy	Himself (voice)	Episode: "The Kiss Seen Round the World"
2013	High School USA!	Otto (voice)	Episode: "Sweet 16"

=== Video game ===
Year	Title	Role	Notes
2006	The Godfather	Salvatore Tessio (voice)	
