= Danny Arnold =

Producer, screenwriter, director, actor (1925–1995)

- Born: Arnold Rothmann; January 23, 1925; New York City, U.S.
- Died: August 19, 1995 (aged 70); Los Angeles, California, U.S.
- Resting place: Mount Sinai Memorial Park Cemetery
- Occupations: Producer; screenwriter; director; actor; comedian
- Spouses: Joanne Gilbert (m. 1955–1956) Donna Arnold (m. 1961–1995)
- Children: 2

Arnold Rothmann (January 23, 1925 – August 19, 1995), known professionally as Danny Arnold, was an American producer, writer, comedian, actor and director known for producing the TV series Barney Miller, That Girl, and Bewitched.

== Early life ==
Born in New York City, Arnold started his career acting in summer stock and doing comedy in vaudeville. During World War II, he served in the United States Marine Corps in the South Pacific. He later moved to Hollywood to continue a career in show business.

== Career ==
Arnold appeared in films as an actor opposite the comic duo Martin and Lewis, and also wrote the screenplay for the Martin and Lewis vehicle The Caddy (1953). In 1956, Arnold started writing for such television series as The Tennessee Ernie Ford Show and The Rosemary Clooney Show. In the 1960s, he began writing and producing episodes for such sitcoms as The Real McCoys, Bewitched, and That Girl. Regarding Bewitched, which he produced for its first season, Arnold noted, "With this show, I saw a great opportunity to accomplish something. Fantasy can always be a jumping-off place for more sophisticated work."

Though his subsequent work was popular with audiences, Arnold frequently butted heads with TV executives regarding issues of content and fair shooting schedules. Television sitcom writer-director Ken Levine described Arnold as "brilliant, unpredictable (a nice term for bi-polar), demanding, and kind." Tapings on Barney Miller became legendary for lasting into the wee hours as Arnold worked on rewrites; due to these extended tapings the show in its later seasons ceased having a live audience. While working on Barney Miller, Arnold became so sick of the constant network battles that he founded his own distribution company Pro-Synd, Inc., so he could syndicate shows as he wished, but with the cancellation of his subsequent series Joe Bash and Stat, his plans for Barney Miller never came to fruition. He eventually sued regarding what he felt was the unfair sharing of the profits from Barney Miller and got a $50 million settlement.

On August 28, 1986, Danny Arnold sold his production company Four D Productions, Inc. to Coca-Cola's Columbia Pictures Television Group for $50 million after Arnold dropped the federal and state lawsuits against Columbia Pictures Industries accusing them of antitrust violations, fraud, and breach of fiduciary duty.

Arnold won two Emmy Awards, one for My World and Welcome to It and one for the series for which he is most famous, Barney Miller. This latter show also won Arnold a Peabody Award. He was honored in 1978 with the Raven Award by the Mystery Writers of America and with the Paddy Chayefsky Award in 1985 by the Writers Guild of America to celebrate his lifetime of achievement.

== TV series ==
- Barney Miller (1975–1982, produced by Four D Productions)
- Fish (1977–1978, produced by the Mimus Corporation)
- A.E.S. Hudson Street (1978, produced by the Triseme Corporation)
- Joe Bash (1986, produced by Tetagram Ltd.)
- Stat (1986)

== Personal life ==
Arnold was married twice and had two children. His first marriage was to the daughter of songwriter Ray Gilbert, actress Joanne Gilbert, in 1955. The marriage ended the following year.

Arnold met his second wife, Donna, while he was working as a writer on The Tennessee Ernie Ford Show and she was appearing as a singer and dancer on the program. They married in 1961 and had two children, David and Dannel. The couple remained married until Arnold's death.

== Death ==
On August 19, 1995, Arnold died of heart failure at his Los Angeles home at the age of 70. He is buried at Mount Sinai Memorial Park Cemetery in Los Angeles.
