= Barney Miller =

American sitcom (1975–1982)

- Genre: Sitcom; Comedy-drama; Police procedural
- Created by: Danny Arnold Theodore J. Flicker
- Starring: Hal Linden; Barbara Barrie; Abe Vigoda; Max Gail; Ron Glass; Jack Soo; Gregory Sierra; James Gregory; Steve Landesberg; Ron Carey
- Theme music composer: Jack Elliott Allyn Ferguson
- Composer: Jack Elliott Allyn Ferguson
- Country of origin: United States
- Original language: English
- No. of seasons: 8
- No. of episodes: 170 (list of episodes)

Production
- Executive producer: Danny Arnold
- Camera setup: Videotape; multi-camera
- Running time: 25 minutes
- Production company: Four D Productions

Original release
- Network: ABC
- Release: January 23, 1975 – May 20, 1982

Related
- Fish

Barney Miller is an American sitcom television series set in a New York City Police Department police station on East 6th Street in the East Village (Lower Manhattan). The series was broadcast on ABC from January 23, 1975, to May 20, 1982. It was created by Danny Arnold and Theodore J. Flicker. Former character actor Noam Pitlik directed 102 of the 170 episodes. It spawned a spin-off series, Fish, that ran from February 5, 1977, to May 18, 1978, focusing on the character Philip K. Fish.

== Premise and main characters ==
Barney Miller takes place almost entirely within the confines of the detectives' squad room and Captain Barney Miller's adjoining office of New York City's fictional 12th Precinct, located in Manhattan's Greenwich Village. A typical episode featured the detectives of the 12th bringing in several complainants or suspects to the squad room. Usually, there were two or three separate subplots in a given episode, with various officers dealing with various crimes. Rarely, about once a year, an episode would feature one or more of the detectives outside of the walls of the precinct, usually either on a stakeout or at their homes (or in one case, in jail).

The squad consists of:

- Capt. Bernard "Barney" Miller: Miller is an affable, personable senior officer who tries to maintain a sense of order while his detectives process a noisy parade of unusual criminals and victims. He reasons with the various complainants to effect a successful conclusion or compromise. Barney is noted around the squad room for his compassion, dedication, and diplomacy, but he has to cope with the personal problems of his squad. His marriage is troubled; both husband and wife love each other, but Mrs. Miller constantly worries for Barney's safety in dangerous police situations, and agitates for him to leave his job or move somewhere else.
- Sgt. Philip K. Fish: The senior member of the squad, the sad-faced Fish is a world-weary police veteran who is friendly enough but seldom smiles. He usually makes pointed observations about the strange situations in the squad room. He is constantly telephoned by his lonely wife Bernice, who saddles him with her own problems. Bernice is seldom seen in person; the character was almost always played by Florence Stanley and once by Doris Belack.
- Sgt. Nick Yemana: Second in seniority, Yemana is an even-tempered, good-humored Japanese-American bachelor. He usually shows only mild surprise at the craziness in the squad room, and makes quietly humorous remarks. He makes only token attempts to handle the mountain of police paperwork, but he follows through on cases. His hobbies are gambling (he is constantly following horse races) and Japanese cooking, and he makes terrible coffee.
- Sgt. Stanley "Wojo" Wojciehowicz: Originally written as a dumbbell with a goofy laugh and funny remarks, Wojo became an "average man" character who often brings his troubles to the office and turns to Barney as a father figure. Wojo cares about people's problems and worries about the consequences of governmental inactivity. (This first manifests itself when Wojo discovers there is no plan in place to evacuate New York in case of an emergency.) In this case, he takes matters into his own hands and summons federal officials, much to Barney's embarrassment. Away from the squad room, Wojo is a ladies' man, whose late nights make him constantly late for work.
- Sgt. Ron Harris: Harris is an African-American bachelor, and early episodes have him using urban street slang. He evolved into a literate, intelligent detective who lapses into dialect only under stress. Harris always dresses impeccably and enjoys the finer things in life, with a thirst for more respect and prestige. He moonlights as a writer of fiction, with magazine stories to his credit. His squad-based novel Blood on the Badge becomes a success, and his pursuit of money occupies many of his working hours.
- Sgt. Chano Amengual: Amengual is a Puerto Rican bachelor and, like Wojo, is sensitive to people's problems. An excellent detective, he is very observant, and his unusual methods sometimes solve cases. He is bilingual, which is helpful when the need arises, and he is disgusted and frankly embarrassed by the influx of petty criminals who are also Puerto Rican.
- Sgt. Arthur Dietrich: When Fish retires, Dietrich replaces him. Dietrich is very low-key and highly intelligent, having trained in both the medical and legal professions, and he has a vast knowledge of specialized topics. He can be counted on to define some esoteric concept quickly and clearly. He is an unusually thorough detective, going to great lengths to follow leads when he thinks he is right, and he uses his wide knowledge to solve baffling cases. Away from the squad room, he is a bachelor who loves jazz and plays the clarinet poorly, and enjoys sports, TV cartoons, and the Three Stooges.
- Officer Carl Levitt: Levitt is an ambitious, obsequious patrolman who delivers the daily mail. He never fails to remind Barney that he is available for plainclothes detective work, and ultimately the persistent Levitt gets to work part-time with the detectives. Levitt occasionally displays surprising skills that help solve cases. Away from the squad room, Levitt also enjoys the Stooges, particularly Shemp Howard.

== Cast ==
=== Regulars ===
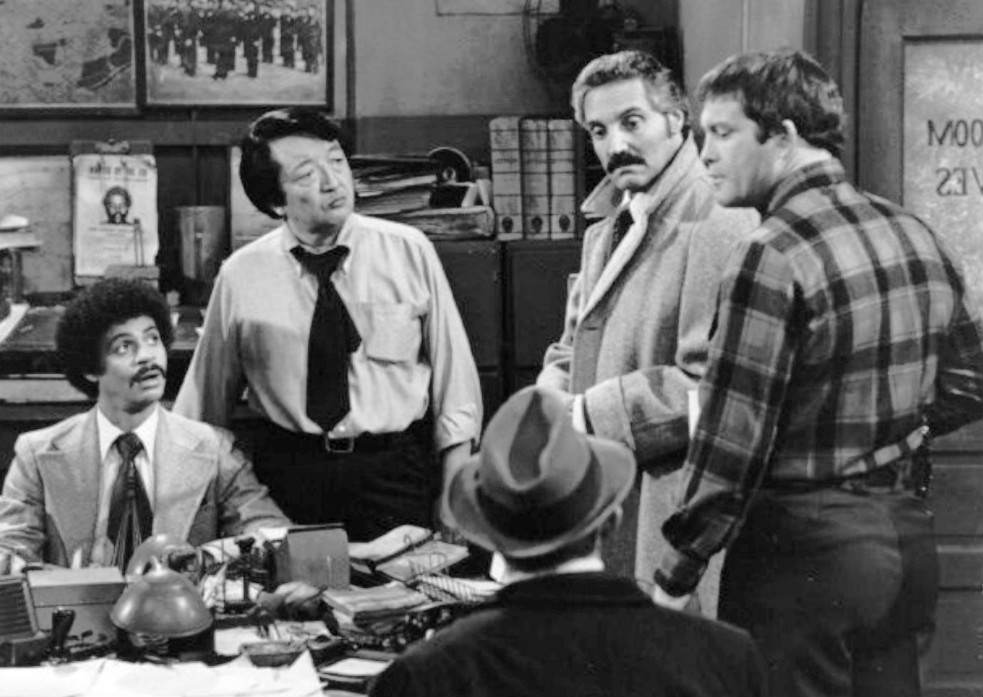
A scene from the season 3 episode “Hash”. Left to right: Ron Glass, Jack Soo, Abe Vigoda (back to the camera), Hal Linden, Max Gail.

Actor	Character	Seasons
Hal Linden	Captain Bernard "Barney" Miller	1–8
Max Gail	Detective 3rd Grade (later Sergeant); Stanley Tadeusz "Wojo" Wojciehowicz	1–8
Ron Glass	Detective 1st Grade (later Sergeant); Ronald Nathan Harris	1–8
James Gregory	Deputy Inspector (later Captain) Franklin D. Luger	1–8
Abe Vigoda	Sergeant Philip K. Fish	1–4, 7
Jack Soo	Sergeant Nick Yemana	1–5
Barbara Barrie	Elizabeth "Liz" Miller, Barney's wife	1–2, 4, 5
Gregory Sierra	Sergeant Miguel "Chano" Amengual	1–2
Steve Landesberg	Sergeant Arthur P. Dietrich	2–8
Ron Carey	Officer Carl E. Levitt	3–8

=== Recurring characters ===
==== Other officers and staff ====
Actor	Character	Seasons
Milt Kogan	Desk Sergeant Kogan	1–2
Paul Lichtman	Mr. Beckman, the building repairman	1–2
George Murdock ‡	Lieutenant Ben Scanlon, Internal Affairs	2, 4–8
Linda Lavin	Detective Janice Wentworth	1, 2
June Gable	Detective Maria Battista	3
Mari Gorman ‡	Detective Roslyn Licori	4, 8
Dino Natali	Officer Zitelli	4–7
Paul Lieber ‡	Detective Eric Dorsey	7
Ed Peck	Patrolman Slater	3, 5

‡ Murdock, Gorman, and Leiber all made guest appearances in other roles in addition to their regularly recurring series roles.

==== 12th Precinct regulars ====
The 12th Precinct had a number of regular complainants, habitués of the holding cell, or other people who often dropped by. Characters seen on three or more episodes included:

Actor	Character	No. of Appear- ances	Seasons
Jack DeLeon	Marty Morrison, shoplifter and petty criminal	8	1–8
Alex Henteloff ‡	Arnold Ripner, opportunistic lawyer	7	1–8
Stanley Brock ‡	Bruno Binder, vigilante	7	4–8
Jack Somack	Mr. Cotterman, liquor-store owner	6	2–5, 7
Ray Stewart	Darryl Driscoll, Marty's boyfriend	5	2–8
John Dullaghan ‡	Ray Brewer, street person	5	5–8
J.J. Barry ‡	Arthur Duncan, robber targeting disadvantaged people	4	7–8
Ralph Manza ‡	Leon Roth, blind man	4	3–8
Doris Roberts ‡	Harriet Brauer	3	4–7
Peter Hobbs	Philip Brauer, investor in gold	3	4–7
Paula Shaw	Paula Capshaw, call girl	3	3–4
Carina Afable	Perlita Avilar, Inspector Luger's mail-order bride	3	8

== Pilot ==
The series emerged from an unsold television pilot, The Life and Times of Captain Barney Miller, that aired on August 22, 1974, as part of an ABC summer anthology series, Just for Laughs. Linden and Vigoda were cast in their series roles; no other eventual cast members were present. Abby Dalton played Barney Miller's wife, Liz, while Val Bisoglio, Rod Perry, and a pre-Hill Street Blues Charles Haid rounded out the cast of the pilot. Guest stars included Mike Moore, Chu Chu Mulave, Henry Beckman, Buddy Lester, Michael Tessier and Anne Wyndham.

The pilot script was later largely reused in the debut episode "Ramon". For this reworked episode, Bisoglio's lines were more or less evenly split between the new characters of Yemana and Chano, while Haid's character of Kazinski became Max Gail's Wojciehowicz. Rod Perry's character, Sgt. Wilson, was replaced by Harris in the reworked episode, although Wilson reappeared one more time in the first-season episode "Experience" before disappearing from the series entirely. Abby Dalton was replaced by Barbara Barrie as Liz, and Henry Beckman's character of Uncle Charlie was dropped entirely. The rest of the guest cast (Moore, Malave, Lester, Tessier, and Wyndham) reprised their roles in the debut episode.

Unlike the remainder of the series, the pilot was shot on film at CBS Studio Center, where the sets of the 12th Precinct and the Miller apartment were originally built. When the show went into regular production in late 1974, it was recorded on videotape. The sets were moved to the ABC Television Center in Hollywood, where they remained until production ended in 1982.

The pilot was never broadcast in syndication. It was released in 2011 as part of Shout Factory's complete series set on DVD.

== Episodes ==
Season	Episodes	Originally released		Rank	Rating
Season	Episodes	First released	Last released	Rank	Rating
1	13	January 23, 1975	May 1, 1975	68	14.7
2	22	September 11, 1975	March 18, 1976	37	—N/a
3	22	September 23, 1976	March 31, 1977	17	22.2
4	23	September 15, 1977	May 18, 1978	17	21.4 (Note: Tied with Fantasy Island.)
5	24	September 14, 1978	May 17, 1979	15	22.6 (Note: Tied with The ABC Sunday Night Movie.)
6	22	September 13, 1979	May 8, 1980	20	20.9 (Note: Tied with Charlie's Angels.)
7	22	October 30, 1980	May 21, 1981	34	18.4
8	22	October 29, 1981	May 20, 1982	54	—N/a

== Opening theme ==
The show's theme music is an instrumental in a jazz fusion style, written by Jack Elliott and Allyn Ferguson. The theme opens with a distinctive bass line performed by studio musician Chuck Berghofer. The bass line was improvised by Berghofer at the request of producer Dominik Hauser: "Can you do something on the bass? This guy is a cop in New York. Can we just start it out with the bass?" Several versions of the theme were used during different seasons.

The theme plays over scenes of the Manhattan skyline, followed by shots of the characters and opening credits. Season 1 opened and closed with a shot of Midtown Manhattan as seen from Weehawken, New Jersey. Season 2 onward opened with a shot of Lower Manhattan as seen from Brooklyn Heights, with a barge being towed in the foreground, and closed with a shot of the Midtown Manhattan skyline as seen from Long Island City.

The theme song was ranked No. 23 and No. 27, respectively, by Complex and Paste magazines, in their lists of "best TV theme songs".

== Production ==
=== Staging ===
Production of Barney Miller deliberately resembled a theatrical stage play; scenes rarely strayed from the precinct station's squad room, with its prominent open-barred holding cell, and Miller's adjoining office. The room was said to be on the second or third floor, depending on the episode. Clutter was plentiful and much of it seemed immobile over the years, including a coat hanging on a clothes rack near Harris's desk. A handful of episodes (fewer than a dozen of 170) were partially or fully set in other locations, including a stakeout location ("Stakeout"), a hospital room ("Hair"), an undercover operation ("Grand Hotel"), a jail (three separate rooms in "Contempt"), a hotel room ("Chinatown"), and the apartments of Barney ("Ramon" and "Graft"), Chano ("The Hero"), Fish ("Fish") and Wojo ("Wojo's Girl"). In "The DNA Story", we finally see the inside of the men's room. Barney Miller tended to obey two of the three classical unities of drama: unity of place and unity of time. The third unity, unity of action, was not followed, since each episode had multiple subplots.

Barney Miller was one of the few sitcoms of the period that occasionally mentioned the then-current year or allowed the audience to infer the then-current year.

=== Taping ===
Barney Miller was notorious for its marathon taping sessions. Early seasons were recorded before a live studio audience and used a laugh track for sweetening reactions during post-production. Creator and executive producer Danny Arnold then rewrote and restaged entire scenes after the audience departed, actively looking for quieter, subtler moments that would not play well before a crowd; a taping session that began in the afternoon or early evening then continued into the early morning hours. Max Gail referred to this in the Jack Soo retrospective episode aired on May 17, 1979, remarking that one of the clips shown was a scene that "we finished around 2:30 in the morning." In a 1977 blooper, a crew member mentions it being 3:15 a.m. Hal Linden says, "We had extremely long taping sessions, which went on even after the audience left. We soon stopped using a studio audience. I think the longest session we had was till 6:30 in the morning."

Writer Tom Reeder described working on the show:

Danny Arnold was the creator of the show, and especially in the early years, he was a marvel. When he was "on", he could spin out entire scenes, ad-libbing dialogue—and great jokes—for every character. By the time those scenes got to script form, though, he obsessively rewrote them.

That's true of a lot of showrunners, but Danny couldn't seem to stop himself. Sometime during season 2 (or maybe it was 3) the show was no longer taped in front of an audience, partly because the script was rarely done by show night. When one season began, six pages were in print. Not six scripts—six pages of one script.

This meant that on the day the show was taped, the actors hung around on the stage, waiting for pages to be sent down. Then—sometimes at 2 a.m.—they had to learn new scenes. Ron Carey (Officer Levitt) got his fairly quickly: "Here's your mail, Captain." On the other hand, poor Steve Landesberg (Dietrich) might have had to memorize long speeches explaining how nuclear fission works.

In the early years, Danny benefited from the heroic writing efforts of Chris Hayward, who was a veteran writer, and rookies Tony Sheehan and Reinhold Weege who, like me, didn't know any better. They were the Barney Miller writing staff. My agent wisely turned down Danny's annual offers of staff jobs, negotiating freelance assignments (so-called "multiple deals") for me instead. Even so, the pace was frantic—on one assignment I was given three hours to write the story outline. On another occasion, a friend came into my office at ABC-Vine Street and said, "Hey, Reeder, want to go get some lunch?" I pointed to the paper in my typewriter and said, "This script is on the stage—thanks anyway."

Employing a live audience became impractical as lengthy reshoots became commonplace. By season 4, only a quiet laugh track was used when necessary.

When the show ended, it was not cancelled; author Danny Arnold tried to recruit new writers, but could find no replacements.

=== Barney Miller's wife ===
When Barney Miller premiered in January 1975, actress Barbara Barrie was hired as a regular cast member to play Liz Miller, Barney's wise, faithful, and loving wife. She received second billing in the opening credits after Hal Linden. During that half-season, Barrie appeared in seven episodes out of thirteen. At that time, the premise of the show was to focus on Barney's career as a police captain at the 12th Precinct as well as his home life with his wife and children.

At the start of the 1975–76 season, when it became evident that storylines at the 12th Precinct were taking precedence, Barrie went to producer Danny Arnold and asked to be released from the show. Arnold reluctantly agreed and Barrie appeared in only two episodes that year: "The Social Worker", which was the second episode of the second season, and the holiday installment "Happy New Year". She continued to receive second billing in the opening credits throughout the second year.

In the third season, Barrie's character and Barney's children were occasionally mentioned but never seen. In the spring of 1978, Barrie returned to the series as a guest star reprising her role of Liz Miller in the episode "Quo Vadis". In that episode, Barney gets shot on duty, but survives his attack virtually unharmed. Liz, upset by the incident and unable to withstand the pressures of being a policeman's wife, gives Barney an ultimatum to either give up his police job so they can move to a safer neighborhood or end their marriage. At the end of the episode, Barney and Liz separate.

During the 1978–79 season, Barrie made her final appearance on Barney Miller in the Christmas show "Toys". In that episode, Liz meets Barney at the 12th Precinct on Christmas Eve to discuss celebrating the holidays with their children, leading up to the possibility of a reconciliation. After this episode, Liz is never seen again, but toward the end of the fifth season, Barney happily announces to his staff that he and Liz have ended their separation and that he is moving back to their apartment. Despite Barrie's absence, her character continues to be mentioned throughout the rest of the show's run, and when a dangerous police emergency is announced on radio or television, Liz always calls to check on Barney's safety.

=== Fish ===
In the first season of Barney Miller, the character of Fish (played by Abe Vigoda) proved so popular that ABC considered a spin-off as early as October 1975, and the actor Vigoda tried to emphasize his importance to Barney Miller. Author Richard Meyers reported, "Abe Vigoda had been complaining loudly and often that if it were not for Fish, Barney might be a bust. He wanted more attention, more credit, and more money. [TV Guide] said that he wanted the show changed to Fish and Barney, although he would accept Barney and Fish." Producer Danny Arnold settled the situation by giving Vigoda his own show, provided that he appeared on at least some of the Barney Miller episodes in the meantime.

Fish premiered on February 5, 1977. It focused on the domestic side of Fish's life as he and his wife Bernice (played by Florence Stanley) became foster parents to five racially mixed children known as "Persons in Need of Supervision" (PINS). Fish continued to appear sporadically in the second half of Season 3 of Barney Miller while also starring in Fish. During the 1977–78 season, Fish officially retired from the NYPD in the second episode of season 4 of Barney Miller. Fish had reasonably good ratings but did not match Barney Miller's. ABC was going to renew the show for a third season, but, according to cast member Todd Bridges, Vigoda demanded more money than the producers were willing to pay. As a result, ABC canceled Fish in May 1978 without a series finale.

There was talk of Vigoda returning to Barney Miller as a regular cast member. According to Vigoda, producer Danny Arnold approached him:

Danny wined and dined me at the Park Lane Hotel the other day in New York, trying to convince me to come back. He wants me either as a regular or to do some guest shots, as well as a Barney Miller movie to be shot in New York for European distribution. I told him I could not make a commitment at the present time because of other offers.

Arnold told reporters, "We've made an offer to him but we haven't received a definite response." Vigoda held out for more money, Arnold refused, and Vigoda finally walked away from negotiations.

After the smoke had cleared from Vigoda's departure, syndicated columnist Gary Deeb wrote candidly about the situation:

A major factor in his disappearing act is the fact that it was Detective Fish, not Abe Vigoda, whom millions of viewers had fallen in love with. Vigoda's recent difficulty in locating respectable work has been triggered by his own personality. According to many Hollywood performers, the guy is a royal pain -- and in many cases, it's simply not worth the hassle to hire him. During his three-and-a-half seasons on Barney Miller, Vigoda drove Danny Arnold, the program's creator, up the wall.

In the spring of 1981, Vigoda did make a final appearance as Fish as a guest in the seventh-season episode "Lady and the Bomb", thus giving his character some closure.

=== Wojo pilot ===
After Fish was canceled, a special one-hour episode of Barney Miller aired on January 25, 1979. It was created as a pilot episode for another possible Barney Miller spin-off to star series regular Max Gail. Titled "Wojo's Girl", the first half of the episode was set at the 12th Precinct in which Wojo (played by Gail) decides to have his girlfriend Nancy, a former prostitute (played by Darlene Parks), live with him. The second half of the installment takes place entirely in Wojo's apartment as he and Nancy struggle to adjust to living together. The pilot did not sell, Parks's character of Nancy was never seen again and Gail remained with Barney Miller until the series ended in the spring of 1982.

=== Linda Lavin ===
Shortly after the premiere of Barney Miller in early 1975, actress Linda Lavin guest starred as Detective Janice Wentworth on the eighth episode "Ms. Cop". Her character in that installment went over very well with audiences and Lavin was brought back as a semi-regular for Barney Miller's second year. During that season, a romance began at the 12th Precinct between Detective Wentworth and Detective (Wojo) Wojciehowicz (played by Max Gail). However, at the same time, Lavin had just completed a television pilot for CBS called Alice, which was based on the Academy Award-winning film Alice Doesn't Live Here Anymore. The pilot quickly sold to CBS and they included it on their schedule for the 1976–1977 season. As a result, Lavin left Barney Miller at the end of the show's second season. Alice ran for nine years on CBS and immediately established Lavin as a television star. Lavin never returned to Barney Miller although her character of Detective Janice Wentworth was seen briefly as a flashback in the last episode of the series, "Landmark: Part 3".

=== Downstairs ===
The Barney Miller episodes often made references to the uniformed policemen "downstairs" in the station house, particularly desk sergeant Kogan (played by actor Milt Kogan). During the first two seasons Kogan himself visited the squad room on business. Thereafter the actor was no longer seen but "Kogan" lived on as the desk sergeant downstairs, whom Barney telephoned whenever his detectives needed reinforcements from the policemen on duty. Officer Carl Levitt (played by Ron Carey) was one of these "uniforms".

=== Other officers ===
The captain's life was sometimes complicated by visits from officers in other departments. The most frequent visitor was Inspector Franklin D. Luger (played by James Gregory). Luger was a battle-scarred veteran of the force whose glory days were the 1940s, when he was a rough-and-ready cop alongside his partners Kleiner, Foster, and Brown. Although his career advanced, his mindset did not. Luger constantly lived in the past, telling and retelling stories of the old days to anyone who would listen, and his clueless and often tactless treatment of current-day felons and detainees was always salvaged more diplomatically by Barney. Away from the station Luger was equally out of date, living alone in a one-room apartment with a hot plate and an antique DuMont television set. Toward the end of the series, he sent for a mail-order bride from the Philippines.

Barney's constant antagonist was Lieutenant Ben Scanlon (played by George Murdock) of the vice squad. The reptilian Scanlon always popped up whenever he heard of irregular activity at the 12th Precinct, and was determined to cause trouble for the unflappable Barney.

=== Death of Jack Soo ===
Toward the end of the fourth year, Jack Soo was diagnosed with esophageal cancer and was absent for the last five episodes of the 1977–78 season. To help fill the void during his medical leave, actress Mari Gorman was brought in for three installments as Officer Roslyn Licori. Cast member Ron Carey's role of Officer Carl Levitt was also expanded at this time to compensate for Soo's absence. Soo returned to Barney Miller at the start of the 1978–79 season but his cancer had already metastasized and spread very quickly. As a result, he only completed nine episodes that year. By the time he taped his last appearance, which was the installment "The Vandal" that aired on November 9, 1978, Soo's illness was quite evident from his rapid weight loss. Two months later, he died on January 11, 1979, at the age of 61. The fifth-season finale "Jack Soo: A Retrospective" aired on May 17, 1979, and was a tribute to him. For this installment, the cast of Barney Miller led by Hal Linden appeared as themselves on the 12th Precinct office set as they fondly shared stories and reminiscences about Soo as an actor. At the end of the episode, the cast raised their coffee cups in loving memory of Jack Soo.

=== Replacing Soo ===
During the seventh season, in an attempt to fill the void left by Jack Soo, a new character was added to Barney Miller: Detective Sergeant Eric Dorsey. The role was filled by young actor Paul Lieber, who had shown promise during the previous season as an inept gunman in "The Architect". Sgt. Dorsey antagonized the squad members immediately by assuming they were all corrupt. Even though he eventually realized that his convictions were not true, the downbeat character was not popular with viewers. As a result, Lieber's tenure on the show lasted only a few weeks with his character of Dorsey reassigned to another precinct.

=== LGBT ===
Marty Morrison (played by Jack DeLeon) was an effeminate shoplifter always getting caught and always trying to plead for clemency from Capt. Miller. Both DeLeon and his dialogue always played for laughs, and Marty became the first popular "guest" character in the show (Marty made the most appearances of any recurring character). After several solo appearances Marty was joined by his more serious boyfriend Darryl Driscoll (played by Ray Stewart). These were among the earliest recurring gay characters on American television. Danny Arnold worked closely with the Gay Media Task Force, an activist group that worked on LGBT representation in media, in developing the characters. Initially both characters were presented in a stereotypically effeminate manner but in later appearances Darryl began dressing and speaking in a more mainstream fashion, and in the episode "The Child Stealers" Darryl disclosed that he was formerly heterosexual but now divorced. In the same episode Officer Zitelli (played by Dino Natali), the new mailroom clerk who had been keeping his homosexuality secret from everyone except Capt. Miller, was angered by hostile remarks and declared, "I'm gay."

=== Slow ratings growth ===
The series took a while to become a hit, but ABC supported it anyway. Suddenly America noticed the show after the fifth episode, "The Courtesans" with Nancy Dussault. Creator/producer/showrunner Danny Arnold threatened to quit his own show, if network censors removed a risqué punchline. (At the end of the episode, Wojo inadvertently insulted the prostitute, who responded bluntly and left the station house. Wojo then timidly asked Barney for the loan of fifty dollars.) The network relented, and the ratings rose sharply. Hal Linden recalls, "Word got out there was an X-rated sitcom, and we went from about 51st place to 21st."

=== Reprieve ===
Danny Arnold had planned to end production of Barney Miller in May 1981, and his decision came as a shocking surprise to the cast and crew. "I never saw so many white faces in one place in my life," said Arnold's spokesman Bob Garon. "There were tears in everyone's eyes, including Hal [Linden's]." Garon explained that Arnold could not find a suitable replacement for departing writer-producer Tony Sheehan, and that Arnold didn't want the show repeating storylines. Linden confirms Arnold's position: "In the next-to-last season, we were having script problems. Every year we lost writers because they left to do their own shows." Arnold, facing "intense pressure from ABC" to reconsider his decision, finally agreed to continue the series. It ran for one more year before he made good on his resolution to end the series. The show was not canceled; the network was reluctant to see the highly rated show leave the air.

== Reception by police ==
Barney Miller retains a devoted following among real-life police officers, who appreciate the show's emphasis on dialog and believably quirky characters, and its low-key portrayal of cops going about their jobs. In a 2005 op-ed for The New York Times, New York police detective Lucas Miller wrote:

Real cops are not usually fans of cop shows. [...] Many police officers maintain that the most realistic police show in the history of television was the sitcom Barney Miller, [...] The action was mostly off screen, the squad room the only set, and the guys were a motley bunch of character actors who were in no danger of being picked for the N.Y.P.D. pin-up calendar. They worked hard, made jokes, got hurt and answered to their straight-man commander. For real detectives, most of the action happens off screen, and we spend a lot of time back in the squad room writing reports about it. Like Barney Miller's squad, we crack jokes at one another, at the cases that come in, and at the crazy suspect locked in the holding cell six feet from the new guy's desk. Life really is more like Barney Miller than NYPD Blue, but our jokes aren't nearly as funny.

Similarly, during his appearance on Jon Favreau's Independent Film Channel talk show Dinner for Five, Dennis Farina, who worked as a Chicago police officer before turning to acting, called Barney Miller the most realistic cop show ever seen on television.

== Awards and honors ==
Nick Yemana's coffee mug, badge, and desk nameplate on display at the National Museum of American History.

Barney Miller won a DGA Award from the Directors Guild of America in 1981. The series won a Primetime Emmy Award for Outstanding Comedy Series in 1982, after it ended. It received six other nominations in that category, from 1976 to 1981. The series won Primetime Emmy Awards for Outstanding Writing in a Comedy Series in 1980 (in addition to nominations in 1976, 1977 and 1982), Outstanding Directing in a Comedy or Comedy-Variety or Music Series in 1979, and was nominated for a number of others. It won Golden Globe Awards for Best Television Comedy or Musical Series in 1976 and 1977 (from a total of seven nominations), and won a Peabody Award in 1978. In 2013, TV Guide ranked Barney Miller at No. 46 on its list of the 60 best series of all time.

A variety of props from the series, including the jail cell door, assignment board, and badges belonging to various characters, are currently owned by the National Museum of American History. Also residing in the collection are Nick Yemana's nameplate and coffee mug, which along with his badge have been displayed as part of the Entertainment Nation exhibit in the museum.

== Home media ==
Sony Pictures Home Entertainment has released the first three seasons of Barney Miller on DVD in Region 1. Season 1 was released on January 20, 2004, to slow sales, and Sony decided not to release any more seasons. However, the decision was later reversed and Season 2 was released in 2008 (four years after the release of Season 1), followed by Season 3 in 2009.

Shout! Factory acquired the rights to the series in 2011 and subsequently released a complete series set on October 25, 2011. The 25-disc set features all 168 episodes of the series as well as bonus features and the first season of the Abe Vigoda spin-off, Fish.

In 2014, Shout! began releasing individual season sets, season 4 was released on January 7, 2014, season 5 on May 13, 2014. Season 6 on December 9, 2014. and Season 7 on April 7, 2015, followed by the eighth and final season on July 7, 2015.

Season 1 was released on DVD in Region 4 on December 20, 2006.

DVD name	Ep #	Release date
The First Season	13	January 20, 2004
The Complete Second Season	22	January 22, 2008
The Complete Third Season	22	March 17, 2009
The Complete Fourth Season	23	January 7, 2014
The Complete Fifth Season	24	May 13, 2014
The Complete Sixth Season	22	December 9, 2014
The Complete Seventh Season	22	April 7, 2015
The Complete Eighth Season	22	July 7, 2015
The Complete Series	168	October 25, 2011
